= Escher (surname) =

Escher is a surname. Notable people with the surname include:

- Alfred Escher (1819−1883), a Swiss politician and railway pioneer
- Arnold Escher von der Linth (1807−1872), a Swiss geologist
- Berend George Escher (1885−1967), a Dutch geologist, half-brother of M. C. Escher
- George Arnold Escher (1843−1939), a Dutch civil engineer, foreign advisor to Japan, father of M. C. Escher
- Gitta Escher (born 1957), a German gymnast
- Hans Conrad Escher von der Linth (1767−1823), a Swiss scientist, civil engineer and politician
- Hans Jakob Escher (1783–1854), a Swiss merchant and politician, mayor of Zurich
- Heinrich Escher (1626−1710), a Swiss politician, mayor of Zürich
- Josef Escher (1885−1954), a Swiss Federal Councilor
- Jutta Escher, German-American physicist
- Luiz Jeferson Escher (born 1987), Brazilian footballer
- Lydia Escher (1858−1891), a Swiss patron of the arts
- M. C. Escher (Maurits Cornelis Escher; 1898−1972), a Dutch graphic artist
- Martin Escher (1788–1870), a Swiss silk manufacturer and railway director
- Rudolf George Escher (1912−1980), a Dutch composer and music theoretician
- Sandra Escher (born 1945), a Dutch psychiatrist
