= Escher family =

Prominent bourgeois family from Zurich, Switzerland

- Place of origin: Kaiserstuhl, Switzerland
- Founded: c. 1190
- Founder: Jacob Escher
- Cadet branches: Escher vom Glas; Escher vom Luchs

The Escher family is a prominent bourgeois family from Zurich, Switzerland, originally from Kaiserstuhl, where they were first mentioned around 1190 with Jacob Escher, a ministerialis of the Counts of Habsburg. The family established itself as one of the leading patrician families of Zurich, with members holding significant political, economic, and military positions throughout Swiss history.

== Origins and early history ==
The Escher family originated in Kaiserstuhl, where they first appeared in historical records around 1190 with Jacob Escher, who served as a ministerialis to the Counts of Habsburg. Family members possessed fiefs on both sides of the Rhine and, from the early 13th century, held the position of avoyer of Kaiserstuhl.

The sons of Johannes Escher (1294), avoyer of Kaiserstuhl, became citizens of Zurich in the 14th century and founded the two main branches of the family. Heinrich Escher, ancestor of the Escher vom Glas branch, was granted citizenship on July 20, 1385. Hans Escher, progenitor of the Escher vom Luchs branch, acquired citizenship on August 4, 1384. The designations "vom Glas" ("of the Glass") and "vom Luchs" ("of the Lynx") refer to their respective coat of arms. Both were members of the Konstaffel of Zurich, the society of the urban upper class.

== Escher vom Glas ==
From the time of their citizenship, the Escher vom Glas belonged to the great Zurich families among the supreme magistrates. Heinrich Escher married first Margaretha zum Thor and second Regula Manesse von Manegg. Through holding public offices, skillful marriage politics, long-distance trade, and military entrepreneurship (mercenary service), the family maintained its position in the city for several centuries.

In the 16th century, two lineages emerged: the descendants of Burgomeister Rudolf Escher, lord of Dübelstein, whose grandson Niclaus Escher abandoned Zurich citizenship in 1527, settled in Basel, and was ennobled through his marriage to Ursula Grieb von und zu Binningen, thereafter calling themselves Escher von Binningen. The descendants of Hans Escher, Rudolf's brother, remained in Zurich where, as wealthy merchants, they occupied positions of significant social and economic weight.

Until 1798, the Escher vom Glas counted five burgomeisters, 45 representatives in the Small Council, and 82 members of the Grand Council. From the 16th to 18th centuries, the family produced 63 bailiffs (34 Obervögte and 29 Landvögte) and 20 bailiff officers, and during the 18th century alone, seven Landvögte of Kyburg, the most important Zurich bailiffage. While the Escher vom Glas sometimes opposed those in power, they were not marginalized: in the 15th century, for example, Rudolf Escher, then burgomeister, and his brother Hans were fierce opponents of Hans Waldmann. In 1526, Hans Escher was arrested for opposing Zwingli; from the following year, he was restored to all his offices and soon commanded Zurich troops in the Second War of Kappel.

At the beginning of the 17th century, the Escher vom Glas divided into various branches that later ramified further: the Pfauen-Escher ("Peacock Escher," named after their house), that of Heinrich Escher, and the Escher-Rahn in France. Until 1539, the Escher vom Glas were primarily members of the Konstaffel (the last representative was Konrad Escher). They then entered different guilds and the noble society of the Schildner zum Schneggen, with some joining the new bourgeois Konstaffel from the second half of the 17th century, following the example of Hans Jakob Escher.

As members of government under the Ancien Régime, the Escher vom Glas also counted eminent politicians in the 19th and 20th centuries; they were also merchants, industrialists, engineers, and scholars (notably Hans Conrad Escher and Hermann Escher). The family worked primarily in the textile industry, then in the related machine industry; Hans Caspar Escher (1775–1859) founded Escher, Wyss & Co. Members of this branch were also involved in the global economy linked to slavery. Hans Caspar Escher (1755–1831) invested notably, through his company Johann Caspar Escher & Co., in the slave ship Olympe. His son Heinrich Escher was a partner in the trading house Hottinguer & Co., which also participated in the Atlantic slave trade and contributed, between 1801 and 1803, to financing the fight against the slave revolt in Saint-Domingue (Haiti). Heinrich inherited from his brother Friedrich Ludwig Escher (called Fritz) a plantation with enslaved people in Cuba, which he sold with the help of his son Alfred Escher. Two family funds were established in 1693; at the beginning of the 21st century, branches of this lineage were established in Zurich, Bern, Northern Italy, Vienna, France, the United States, and Germany.

== Escher vom Luchs ==
Götz Escher, son of Hans Escher, became, notably through his marriage to Elisabeth Schwarzmurer, one of the richest Zurichers of his time. In 1429, he acquired the house called Brunnenturm, which remained in the family until 1810; in 1433, on the occasion of the coronation of Emperor Sigismund, he was dubbed knight in Rome and received a coat of arms. Until the 19th century, the Escher vom Luchs, who bore the title of Junker, were among the ruling families. They possessed several lordships, notably Uitikon (acquired by Hans Jacob Escher in 1521, ceded to the city of Zurich in 1549), Berg am Irchel (acquired during the marriage of Hans Heinrich Escher to Anna Dorothea von Meiss in 1642, transmitted by inheritance until 1798), and Wülflingen (acquired by Hans Hartmann Escher in 1634, transmitted to the Meiss through his daughter Margaretha). The Escher vom Luchs held countless public offices. Until the Helvetic Republic, there were ten bailiffs among them in the common bailiffages and 67 bailiffs (22 Landvögte and 45 Obervögte) in the canton of Zurich; moreover, they often exercised commands in the army.

Johann Conrad Escher and Hans Conrad Escher were both burgomaster at the beginning of the 19th century, a function their family had never exercised under the Ancien Régime; indeed, being part of the noble society zum Rüden, they were excluded from this office. The Escher vom Luchs conducted skillful marriage politics, allying with both the nobility and wealthy merchant families. At the end of the 18th century, they were among the most opulent Zurich families and sat in the noble society of the Schildner zum Schneggen. The family fund established in 1770 was dissolved in 1869. One of its representatives, Nanny von Escher, was active in the literary field.

== Prominent family members ==
- Hans Caspar Escher (1775–1859), a Swiss industrialist, politician and architect
- Heinrich Escher (1776–1853), a Swiss merchant, speculator, and financier who operated in the colonial expansion zones of North America and Central America
- Friedrich Ludwig Escher (1779–1845), a Swiss merchant, coffee plantation owner and slave owner
- Hans Jakob Escher (1783–1854), a Swiss merchant, judge and politician, mayor of Zurich
- Ferdinand Escher (1787–1855), a Swiss businessman and plantation administrator in Cuba
- Martin Escher (1788–1870), a Swiss silk manufacturer and railway director
- Alfred Escher (1819–1882), a Swiss business magnate, banker, railway pioneer and politician who most notably served on the National Council from 1848 to 1882 for the Liberal Party
- Albertina Escher (c. 1842 – after 1891), a Cuban-born woman who was freed from slavery by the will of her presumed father, Friedrich Ludwig Escher

== Bibliography ==
- Keller-Escher, Carl: Fünfhundert und sechzig Jahre aus der Geschichte der Familie Escher vom Glas, 1320–1885. Festgabe zur Feier des fünfhundertsten Jahrestages ihrer Einbürgerung zu Zürich, 2 vol., 1885 (genealogy).
- Almanach généalogique suisse, vol. 1, 1905, pp. 112–128; vol. 5, 1933, pp. 182–183.
- Schulthess, Hans: Kulturbilder aus Zürichs Vergangenheit, vol. 1, 1930, pp. 153–156.
- Guyer, Paul: Verfassungszustände der Stadt Zürich im 16., 17. und 18. Jahrhundert unter der Einwirkung der sozialen Umschichtung der Bevölkerung, 1943.
- Guyer, Paul: "Der 'Brunnenturm' und seine Bewohner", in: Zürcher Taschenbuch 1978, 98, 1977, pp. 1–22.
- Neue Zürcher Zeitung, 20/21.7.1985.
- Escher-Bürkli, Hans Jakob; Escher, Gertrud L.; Escher-Diener, Eduard F.: Fortsetzung der Genealogie der Familie Escher vom Glas, 1885–1985, ms., 1985 (Staatsarchiv Zürich).
- Escher, Günter Bernhard: Geschichte der Familie Escher vom Glas, 1997.
- Illi, Martin: Die Constaffel in Zürich. Von Bürgermeister Rodolf Brun bis ins 20. Jahrhundert, 2003.
- Niederhäuser, Peter (ed.): Alter Adel – neuer Adel? Zürcher Adel zwischen Spätmittelalter und früher Neuzeit, 2003.
- Frey, Stefan: Fromme feste Junker. Neuer Stadtadel im spätmittelalterlichen Zürich, 2017.
- Zeuske, Michael Max Paul: "Tod bei Artemisa. Friedrich Ludwig Escher, Atlantic Slavery und die Akkumulation von Schweizer Kapital ausserhalb der Schweiz", in: Revue suisse d'histoire, 69/1, 2019, pp. 6–26.
- Brengard, Marcel; Schubert, Frank; Zürcher, Lukas: Die Beteiligung der Stadt Zürich sowie der Zürcherinnen und Zürcher an Sklaverei und Sklavenhandel vom 17. bis ins 19. Jahrhundert: Bericht zu Handen des Präsidialdepartements der Stadt Zürich, 2020.
