= Heinrich Escher (1776–1853) =

Swiss merchant and speculator involved in colonial trade and slavery (1776-1853)

- Born: Heinrich Escher vom Glas; February 22, 1776; Zurich, Switzerland
- Died: November 12, 1853 (aged 77); Zurich, Switzerland
- Occupations: Merchant, speculator, financier
- Spouse: Lydia Zollikofer von Altenklingen (m. 1815)
- Children: Alfred Escher, Clementine Escher
- Parent(s): Hans Caspar Escher (father); Anna Keller vom Steinbock (mother)
- Relatives: Friedrich Ludwig Escher (brother); Ferdinand Escher (brother)

Heinrich Escher (22 February 1776 – 12 November 1853) was a Swiss merchant, speculator, and financier who operated in the colonial expansion zones of North America and Central America. Born into a prominent Zurich banking family, he accumulated significant wealth through colonial trade, plantation ownership, and involvement in the Atlantic slave trade. His fortune, partly derived from enslaved labor and slave trading, contributed to the economic foundation of the influential Escher vom Glas family, including his son Alfred Escher, who became a key figure in 19th-century Swiss politics and railway development.

== Early life and family ==
Heinrich Escher was the eldest of nine children born to Hans Caspar Escher (1755–1831), a banker, military officer, and merchant active in the slave trade, and Anna Keller vom Steinbock. He was the brother of Friedrich Ludwig Escher and Ferdinand Escher. The Escher family was among Zurich's prominent merchant dynasties, with extensive business interests spanning Europe and the Americas.

After attending the municipal school in Zurich, Heinrich received commercial training under banker Hans Konrad Hottinger in Paris. This apprenticeship provided him with the financial expertise and international connections that would prove crucial for his later business ventures.

== Business career in America ==
From 1795 to 1806 and again from 1812 to 1814, Escher lived in the United States, operating primarily in New England, Virginia, Charleston, Savannah, and New Orleans. He served as a commercial agent for Hottinguer & Cie, the banking firm established by his former mentor.

In 1801, Escher became a partner in Hottinguer & Cie, which was deeply involved in the Atlantic slave trade and provided financing for the French military expedition against the slave insurrection in Saint-Domingue (Haiti). The firm's involvement in these activities reflected the widespread European financial support for maintaining colonial slavery systems.

Escher engaged extensively in land speculation in colonial expansion zones, acquiring large estates and leasing plantations. His commercial activities centered on trading colonial goods produced by enslaved labor, including tobacco, cotton, rice, sugar, dyewoods, and furs. These luxury commodities and raw materials were shipped primarily to France and other parts of Europe through maritime trade networks.

Through his involvement in properties that had belonged to indigenous peoples and his participation in the slave-based economy, Escher accumulated a fortune of approximately one million Swiss francs. His business network in the United States extended to the highest levels of society, including relationships with prominent businessmen and politicians such as John Jacob Astor, Thomas Jefferson, and George Washington.

== Return to Switzerland and family life ==
In 1814, Escher returned to Switzerland and purchased property in Zurich, shifting his focus to financial affairs and maintaining relationships within his extended family and social circle. In 1815, he married Lydia Zollikofer von Altenklingen, a member of an old St. Gallen merchant family. The couple had two children: Clementine and Alfred Escher, who would later become one of Switzerland's most influential political and economic figures.

In 1825, Escher acquired the Enge estate in the Zurich area and developed the Villa Belvoir. He assembled an important insect collection, which was later managed by biologist Oswald Heer and eventually transferred to the Swiss Federal Institute of Technology (ETH) in Zurich.

== Cuban plantation interests ==
Heinrich Escher's wealth was further augmented through his involvement in his younger brothers' business ventures, first in Russia and later in Cuba, where Friedrich Ludwig and Ferdinand Escher arrived in 1820 or 1821. The brothers acquired the coffee plantation (cafetal) Buen Retiro near Artemisa with its complete infrastructure, buildings, and approximately 85 enslaved men and women.

There are two versions regarding this acquisition. The more plausible account suggests that Friedrich Ludwig and Ferdinand Escher took over the plantation in 1821 from Hans Heinrich Stouder (Studer) of Winterthur and another owner, with Heinrich providing financial backing and leveraging his business connections. An alternative, less likely version claims that Heinrich himself purchased the plantation during a brief visit to Cuba in 1803.

When Friedrich Ludwig Escher died at Buen Retiro in 1845—Ferdinand had already returned to Switzerland in 1826—most of his assets were transferred to Heinrich Escher in Zurich. Friedrich Ludwig had freed two enslaved people in his will: Serafina and their presumed daughter, Albertina Escher. The inheritance allocated to Heinrich amounted to approximately 40,000 Spanish silver pesos (the global currency of the time), nearly half of which represented the value of enslaved people, equivalent to about one million Swiss francs.

Heinrich accepted the inheritance through a document prepared in Zurich—a power of attorney (poder) translated from German to Spanish. His son Alfred Escher assisted him in managing this Cuban succession and supported him when the inheritance became public knowledge in 1846.

== Controversy and public scrutiny ==
When the Cuban inheritance became public in 1846, criticism arose regarding the family's wealth derived from this legacy and Heinrich Escher's activities in the United States. Critics accused him of building his fortune not only through the ownership and exploitation of enslaved people but also through direct participation in the slave trade.

It is documented that Escher was a partner in Hottinguer & Cie and that he inherited the Cuban plantation with its enslaved workers (whom he likely sold later). However, research has yet to definitively determine whether his commercial activities in the American "frontier" regions included human trafficking at that early stage of American colonial expansion.

== Death and legacy ==
Heinrich Escher died on 12 November 1853 in Zurich. His accumulated wealth, derived significantly from colonial trade and slavery-based enterprises, provided the economic foundation for his family's continued prominence in Swiss society. His son Alfred Escher used this inherited wealth to become a dominant figure in 19th-century Swiss politics, railway development, and banking, earning the nickname "King Alfred I" for his influence over Swiss economic development.

== Bibliography ==
- Heer, Oswald: «Heinrich Escher-Zollikofer. Eine Lebensskizze», in: Zürcher Taschenbuch auf das Jahr 1910, 33, 1910, pp. 192–242.
- Ramírez Pérez, Jorge Freddy; Paredes Pupo, Fernando Antonio; Spengler, Eusebio Leal: Francia en Cuba. Los cafetales de la Sierra del Rosario (1790-1850), 2004.
- Jung, Joseph: Alfred Escher. 1819-1882. Aufstieg, Macht, Tragik, 2007 (2017).
- Zeuske, Michael: «Kaffee statt Zucker. Die globale commodity Kaffee und die Sklaverei auf Kuba (ca. 1790-1870)», in: Saeculum, 67/2, 2017, pp. 275–303.
- Zeuske, Michael Max Paul: «Tod bei Artemisa. Friedrich Ludwig Escher, Atlantic Slavery und die Akkumulation von Schweizer Kapital ausserhalb der Schweiz», in: Revue suisse d'histoire, 69/1, 2019, pp. 6–26.
- Brengard, Marcel; Schubert, Frank; Zürcher, Lukas: Die Beteiligung der Stadt Zürich sowie der Zürcherinnen und Zürcher an Sklaverei und Sklavenhandel vom 17. bis ins 19. Jahrhundert: Bericht zu Handen des Präsidialdepartements der Stadt Zürich, 2020.
