= Fern pine =

Fern pine may refer to:

- Afrocarpus falcatus, the African fern pine, a podocarp tree native to southern Africa
- Podocarpus macrophyllus, a podocarp tree native to China
