= Escher =

Escher may refer to:

== People ==
- Escher (surname)
- Maurits Cornelis Escher (1898–1972), Dutch graphic artist

== Places ==
- 4444 Escher, an asteroid named after Maurits Cornelis Escher
- Escher Wyss (Zürich), a borough of Zurich
- Escher Museum, containing the work of Maurits Cornelis Escher

== Other uses ==
- Escher (programming language), a declarative programming language
- Escher Wyss & Cie., a former engineering company in Switzerland

== See also ==
- Esher (disambiguation)
- Escherich (disambiguation)
- Escherichia
