= Ferdinand Escher =

Swiss entrepreneur and plantation administrator in Cuba (1787–1855)

- Born: June 6, 1787; Zurich, Switzerland
- Died: July 14, 1855 (aged 68); Zurich, Switzerland
- Occupations: Entrepreneur, plantation administrator
- Relatives: Alfred Escher (nephew); Heinrich Escher (brother); Friedrich Ludwig Escher (brother)
- Family: Escher family

Ferdinand Escher (6 June 1787 – 14 July 1855) was a Swiss businessman and plantation administrator who worked in Cuba during the early 19th century. Born into the prominent Escher family of Zurich, he was involved in emigration activities and later administered a coffee plantation in Cuba before returning to Switzerland, where he lived in relative obscurity.

== Early life and family ==
Ferdinand Escher was born on 6 June 1787 in Zurich to Hans Caspar Escher (1755–1831), a banker, officer, and merchant involved in the slave trade, and Anna Keller vom Steinbock. He was the youngest of nine children and the seventh son of the couple. Among his siblings were Heinrich and Friedrich Ludwig Escher (known as Fritz), and he was the uncle of the prominent Swiss politician and railway pioneer Alfred Escher. Ferdinand remained unmarried throughout his life and had no descendants.

== Career in Russia and imprisonment ==
While still young, Ferdinand joined his older brother Friedrich Ludwig, who had emigrated to Russia in 1798 to join their father. Hans Caspar Escher had been forced to leave Zurich in 1789 following a bankruptcy. The two brothers chose a path between military careers in foreign service and commercial ventures, becoming emigration agents with financial support from their brother Heinrich.

In 1815, the brothers were arrested for illegal commerce and imprisoned in Russia until 1819, despite Heinrich's efforts to secure their release. After their liberation, they traveled discreetly to Zurich before departing for Cuba, where they arrived in 1820 or 1821.

== Life in Cuba ==
In Cuba, the Escher brothers established themselves at the coffee plantation called Buen Retiro, located near Artemisa west of Havana. The plantation was likely acquired in 1821. While Friedrich Ludwig remained as the primary owner and manager until his death, Ferdinand served as the plantation's administrator. In this role, he was responsible for the plantation's finances and oversight, which included determining the work quotas for the enslaved workers and ordering punishments when deemed necessary.

Ferdinand's position as administrator rather than primary owner reflected the practical considerations of plantation management. Having two chiefs would have been both costly and problematic for operational control. His role as the younger brother likely relegated him to this secondary but crucial administrative function.

== Return to Switzerland ==
Ferdinand Escher returned to Zurich in 1826, while his brother Friedrich Ludwig remained at the plantation until his death near Artemisa. The exact reasons for Ferdinand's departure from Cuba are not definitively known, but they may have been related to his dissatisfaction with rural life in western Cuba, where the coffee plantations bordered undeveloped lands, and his secondary role in the plantation's hierarchy. It is suggested that Ferdinand, who may have served as administrator reluctantly, either could not or did not wish to continue in this capacity for an extended period.

Upon his return to Zurich, Ferdinand lived quietly at the house zum Neuberg with his unmarried siblings Georg and Anna Escher. He maintained little contact with Zurich's ruling class and did not participate in the city's social life, living in relative discretion until his death on 14 July 1855.

== Bibliography ==
- Hazard, Samuel. Cuba a pluma y lapiz, vol. 3, 1928, pp. 67-93 (English 1871).
- Singleton, Theresa A. Slavery behind the Wall. An Archaeology of a Cuban Coffee Plantation, 2015.
- Jung, Joseph. Alfred Escher. 1819-1882. Aufstieg, Macht, Tragik, 2017^{6} (2007), pp. 21-46.
- Zeuske, Michael. "Kaffee statt Zucker. Die globale commodity Kaffee und die Sklaverei auf Kuba (ca. 1790-1870)", in: Saeculum, 67/2, 2017, pp. 275-303.
- Zeuske, Michael Max Paul. "Tod bei Artemisa. Friedrich Ludwig Escher, Atlantic Slavery und die Akkumulation von Schweizer Kapital ausserhalb der Schweiz", in: Revue suisse d'histoire, 69/1, 2019, pp. 6-26.
- Brengard, Marcel; Schubert, Frank; Zürcher, Lukas. Die Beteiligung der Stadt Zürich sowie der Zürcherinnen und Zürcher an Sklaverei und Sklavenhandel vom 17. bis ins 19. Jahrhundert: Bericht zu Handen des Präsidialdepartements der Stadt Zürich, 2020.
