= Villa Belvoir =

Mansion and park in Enge, Switzerland

Villa Belvoir (Belvoirpark)
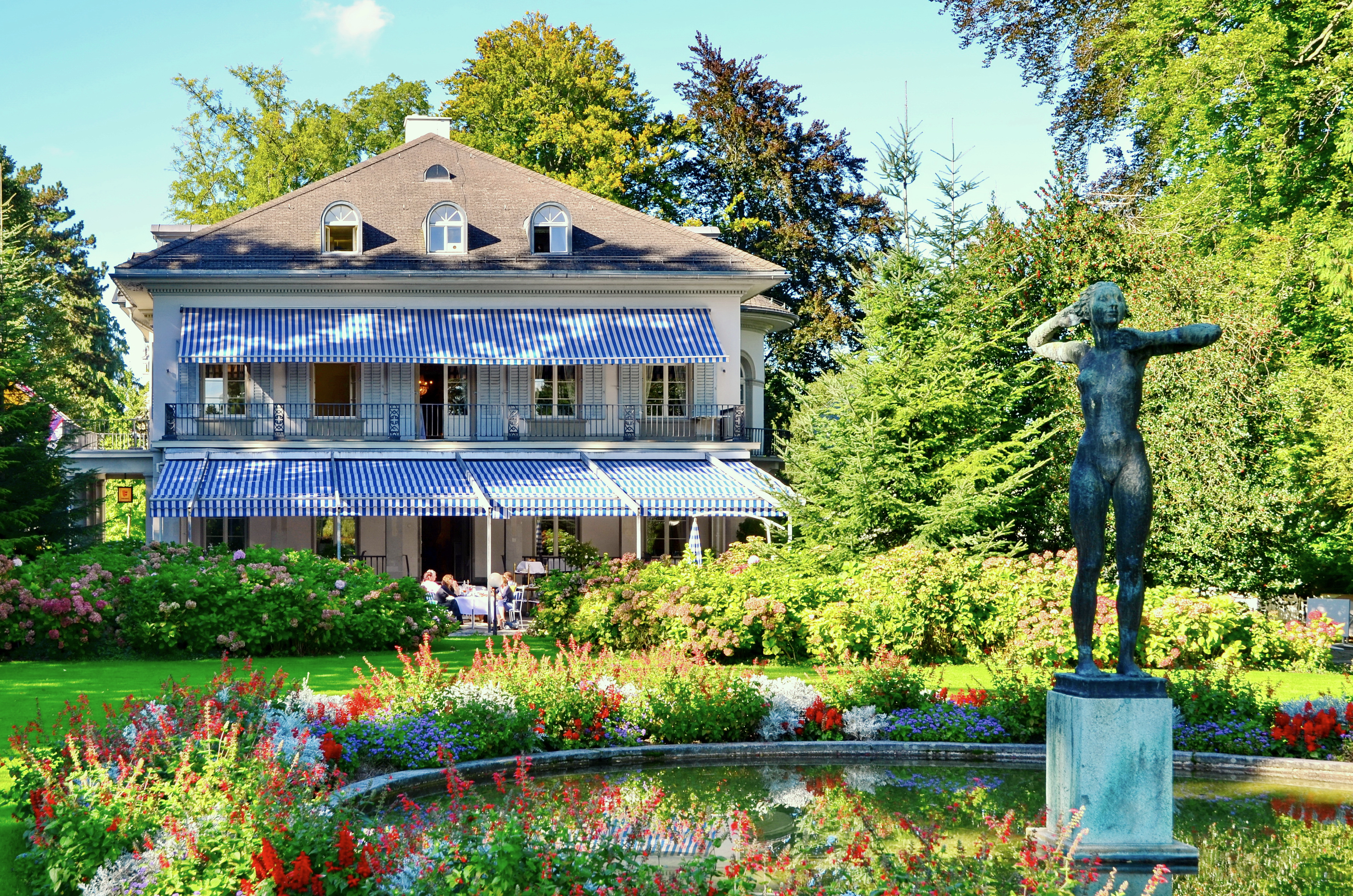
- Villa Belvoir as seen from upper park area
- Interactive map of the Villa Belvoir (Belvoirpark) area

General information
- Type: mansion and park
- Architectural style: Neoclassical architecture
- Location: Enge (Zürich), Switzerland, Seestrasse 125, CH-8002 Zürich
- Coordinates: 47°21′26.01″N 8°32′1.1″E
- Construction started: 1828
- Completed: 1831

Technical details
- Floor count: 3

Design and construction
- Architect: Heinrich Escher

The Villa Belvoir is a mansion in Zürich-Enge built between 1828 and 1831. It is registered in the Swiss Inventory of Cultural Property of National and Regional Significance along with the Belvoirpark, one of the largest public parks and arboreta in the city of Zürich in Switzerland.

== Location ==
Lydia Escher's (1858–1891) grandfather Heinrich Escher (1776–1853) had built the country house Belvoir, situated on the east shore of Lake Zurich in the then village of Enge, which is now a district of the city of Zürich. The area houses the Hotelfachschule Belvoirpark and is one of the largest public parks in Zürich. Public transport is provided by the Zürich Tram route 7 and by the bus lines 161 and 165.

== History ==
In 1826, Heinrich Escher purchased the so-called Wyssbühel, a vine-covered hill on the shore of Lake Zürich. Following his own designs, he had the top of the hill removed and used the material to fill in the swampy banks. The area was then planted with exotic trees, some of which originated from Northern America. The High Neoclassical mansion in the centre of the complex was built between 1828 and 1831. Heinrich Escher, Lydia Zolliker and their children Clementina and Alfred Escher (1819–1882) were the first inhabitants, establishing the Escher's family tradition to Alred's daughter Lydia Escher to 1890. In addition to his scientific collections and studies, Heinrich Escher dedicated himself especially the design and maintenance of his estate, which he called Belvoir (beautiful view in French).

On occasion of the construction of the so-called linksufrige Seeuferbahn (literally: left lakeside railway) in 1872, the spacious estate lost the direct access to the lake. Alfred Escher died in 1882, and he inherited the estate to his daughter Lydia; after her suicide in 1891, the estate was the base to establish the Gottfried Keller Foundation and was bequeathed to the Swiss Confederation (Eidgenossenschaft). The Federal Council acted as the administrator of the foundation, and planned to sell the estate, to meet Lydia Escher's conditions attached to the gift. When this became known, prominent Zürich citizens formed a committee to save the park for the public use. As the city government was unable to raise the funds to purchase the estate, the citizens of Zürich bought shares to help rescue the park, and within a few days, the required capital was secured. To finance its maintenance, the Belvoirpark Society (Belvoirpark-Gesellschaft) sold several building plots along Seestrasse. In 1901, the city of Zürich was able to take over the property and thanked its citizens for preventing the appalling loss of the treasured estate. The villa was renovated in 1925 to house the Hotel and Hospitality School with an attached restaurant, known as Belvoir. As of today, the villa also is used by the Wollishofen guild, but it primarily houses the restaurant Belvoir Park which is operated by the students of the hotel management school Belvoirpark Hotelfachschule.

== Belvoirpark ==
The Belvoirpark is one of Zürich's earliest landscape gardens and attracted much admiration on the occasion of its opening. At that time, both its location with magnificent views of the city, the lake and the mountains, as well the varied and exciting terrain design and the present, exceptionally crafted arboretum, attracted. In 1881, a double row of Populus trees marked the access to the villa, which led to the greenhouse and the stables. On the highest point of the area, the villa is situated, nestled in large groups of trees. The parterre of flowers, featuring banana palms, a fountain, and carpet beds, extends in a southeasterly direction. At its southern end, on the edge of the artificially flattened hilltop, there is a scenic view of the lake and mountains. A large vegetable garden, along with the utility building, completes the park in its southwestern corner.

The childhood friend of Lydia Escher's husband, Karl Stauffer-Bern, was allowed to set up a studio in the greenhouse of the Belvoirpark in 1886. In 1889 Stauffer initiated the idea, to re-design the park after Italian landscapes and architecture. When the work was nearly completed, the family planned to move to Italy, and Lydia and her husband traveled to Florence, where they were looking for a new property with the help of Stauffer. Among the various specimens, there are Acer buergeranum, Magnolia × soulangeana, Rhododendron, Ginkgo biloba, Carya, Campsis radicans, Abies cephalonica, Abies pinsapo and Podocarpus chinensis. In 1895, a project was implemented by Evariste Mertens comprising a Baroque jewelry investment with lawn tennis courts and a generous croquet square.

Fourteen years later a heated pond to the presentation of tropical aquatic plants was installed, being a reminiscent of the jungle-like structures of the Brissago Islands. The border and scenic shore planting mark the transition into the native flora with subtropical and some flowering plants. The transformation of the flower terrace was done in 1923. A larger well should be built, and Hermann Haller created a bronze sculpture on the base of the old fountain. In 1933, the largest rebuilt of the park took place with the extension of the Alfred-Escher-Strasse to Wollishofen, therefore in the north an area of 1,500 square meters and in the south around 2,100 square meters went lost. The Chestnut as well as the Elm trees had been cut without substitution, the tennis courts disappeared, and a new entrance was built. Only the lakeside entrance to the Park still corresponds to the park borders around 1830.

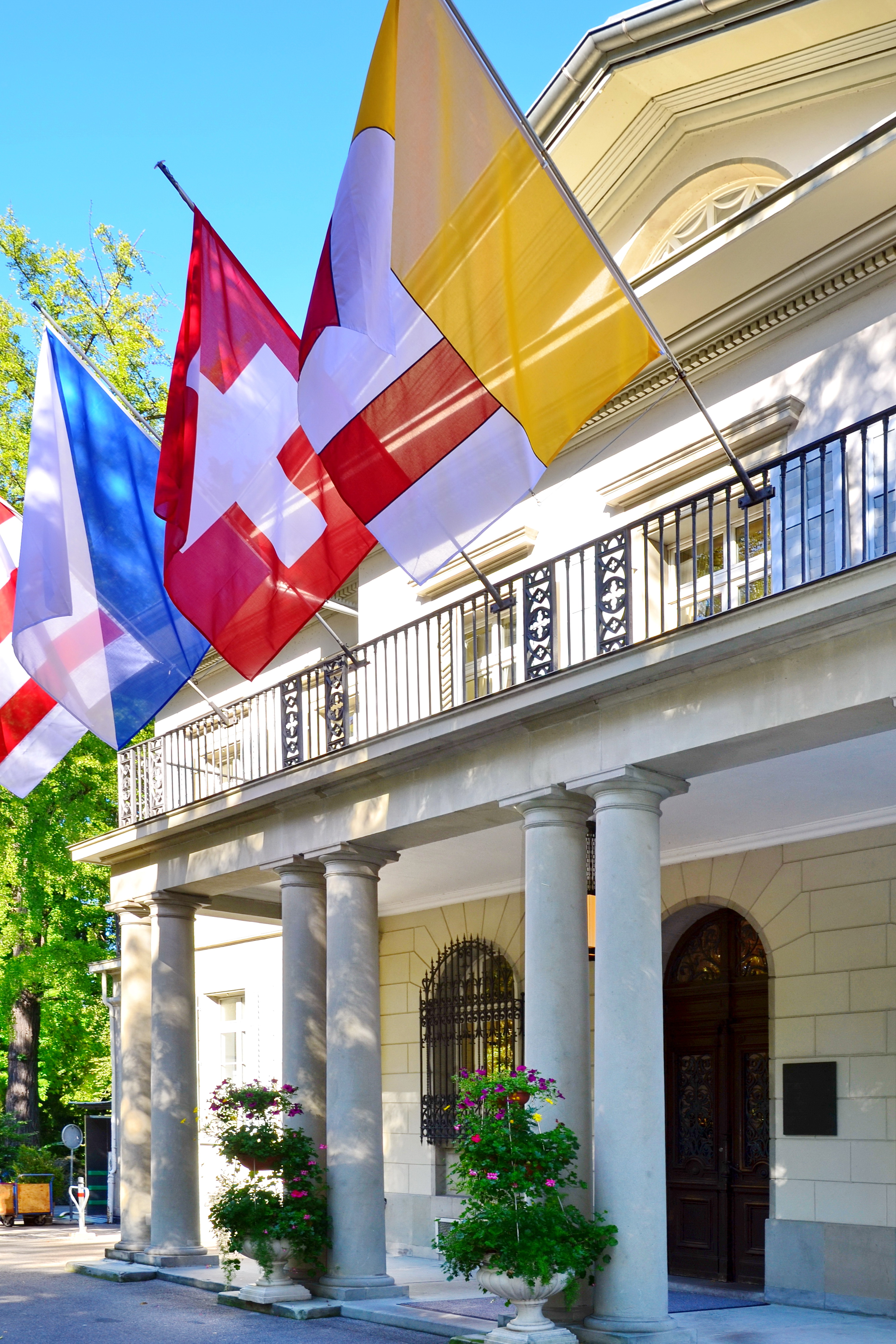

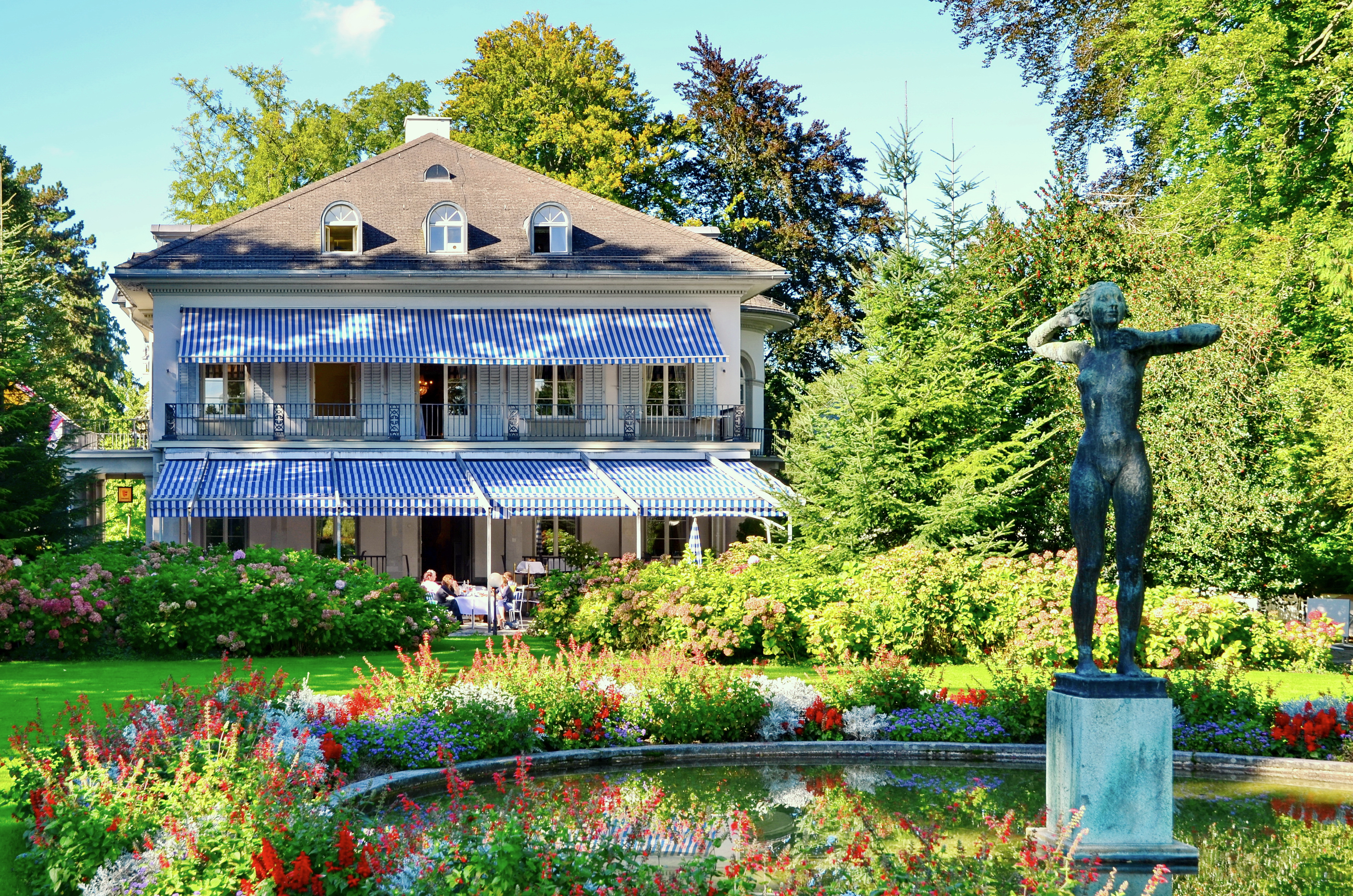

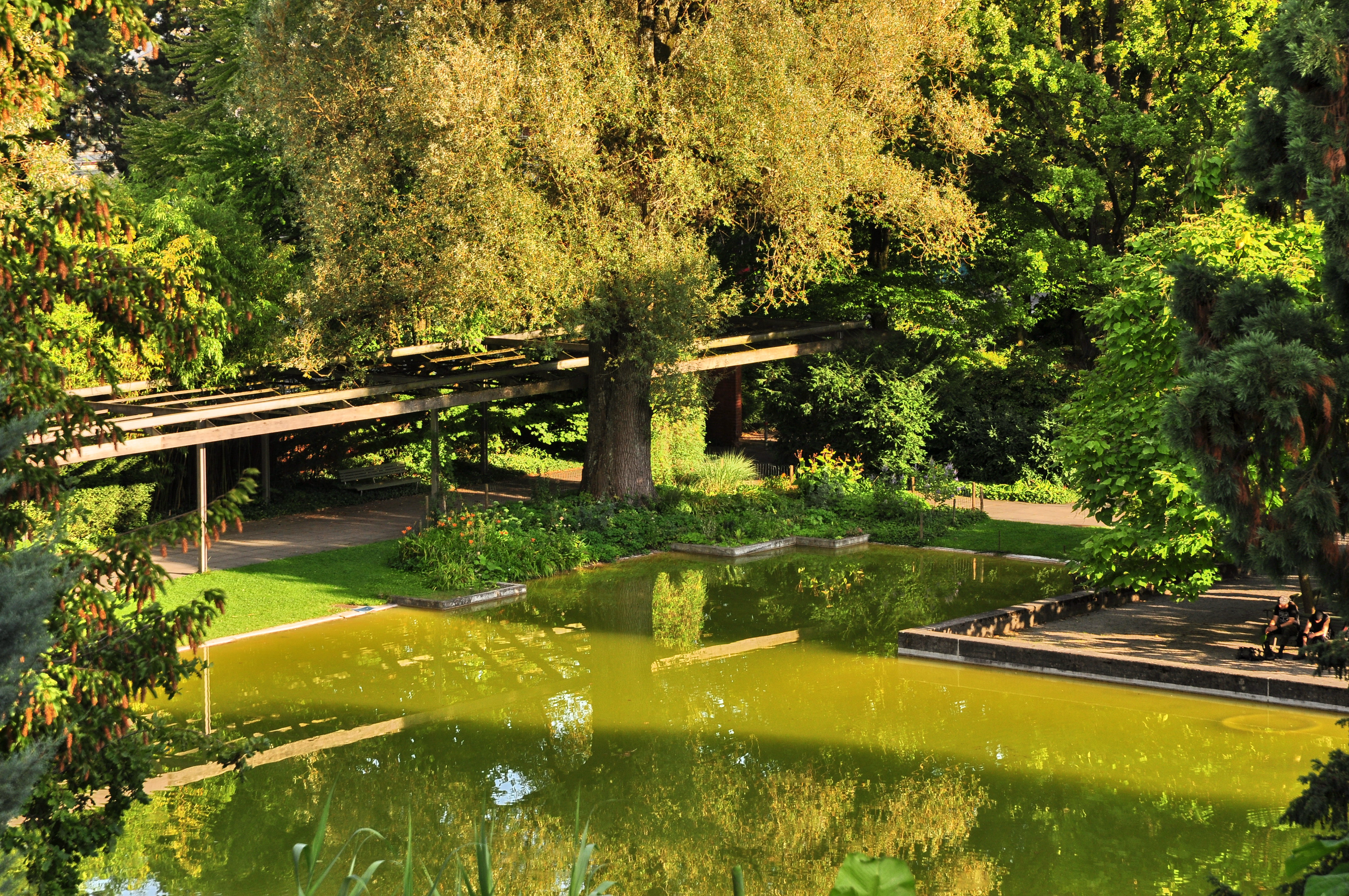

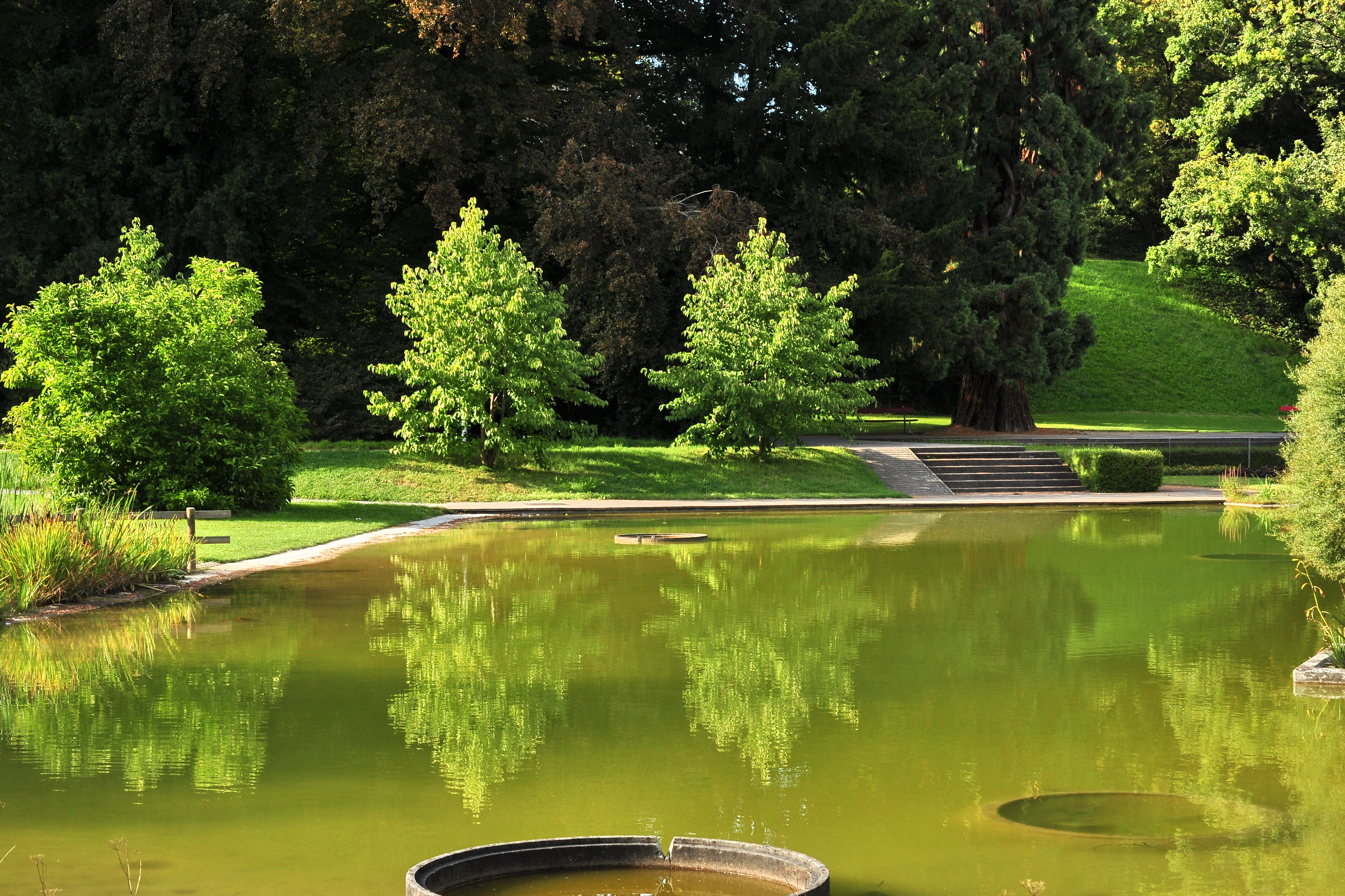

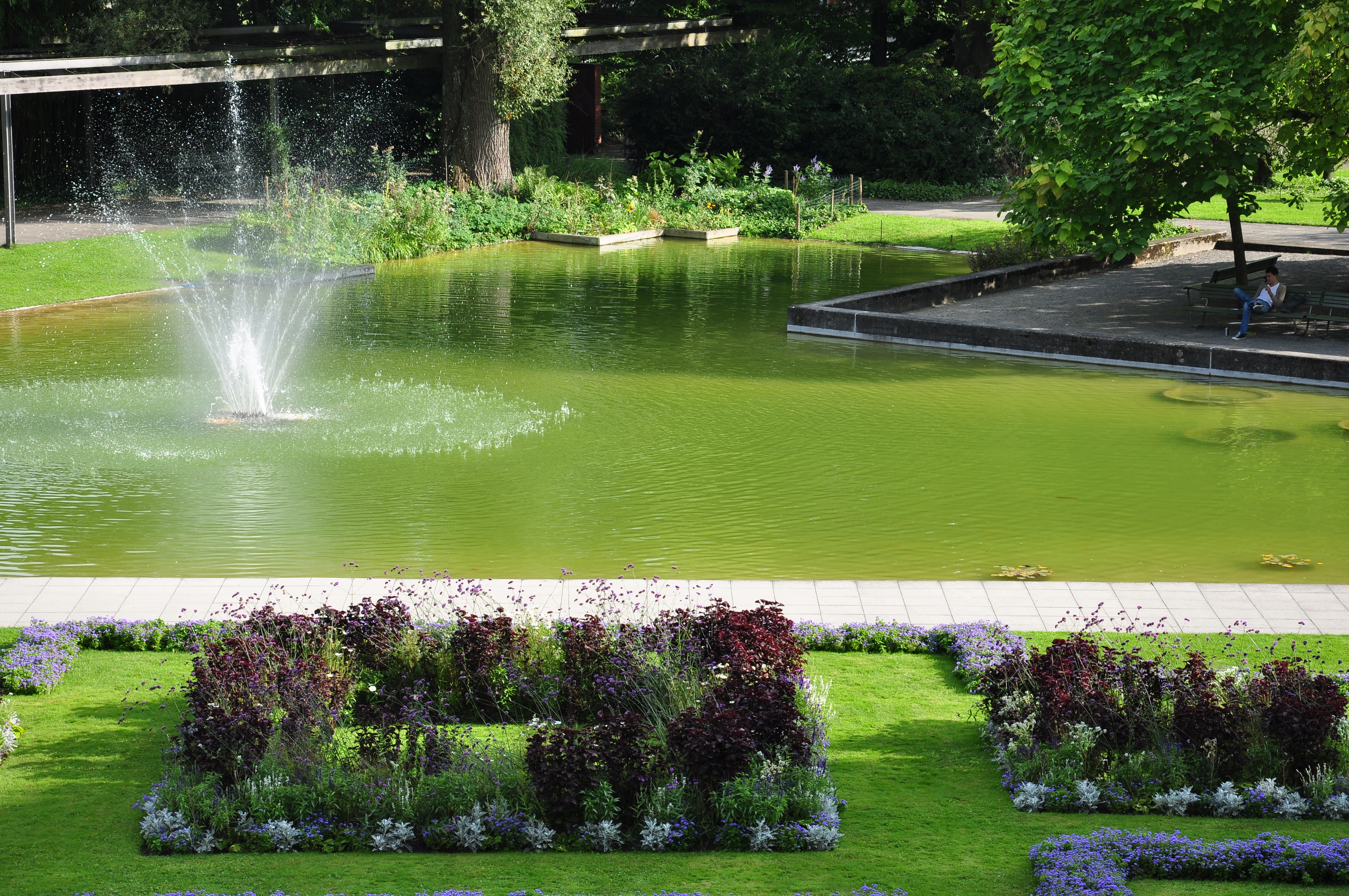

The Schneeligut area integrated on occasion of the 1939 Swiss national exhibition, and the grotto of Karl Stauffer had to be replaced. On occasion of the G59 exhibition, the central puplic square in the garden was rebuilt, and the free-standing wall with the Pergola at the lily pool and the Iridae gardens establisblished. In 1985, the garden area with the Irideae, the so-called Irisgarten, was redesigned by Walter Frischknecht. About 120 different types of Iridae bloom from March (miniature Iris) until July (Iris barbata), and there grow, among many others, Iris pseudacorus and Peony.

== Cultural heritage of national importance ==
The area of the park and the mansion and assiciotaed buildings are listed in the Swiss inventory of cultural property of national and regional significance as a Class A object of national importance. The associated buildings, the former stables and the greenhouse, are not publicly accessible.

== Literature ==
- Gartenbiografien: Orte erzählen. vdf Hochschulverlag AG, ETH Zürich, Zürich 2013, ISBN 978-3728135797.
