= Albertina Escher =

19th-century Cuban-born freed slave of Swiss plantation owner

- Born: c. 1842 (officially 15 June 1845); Buen Retiro plantation, near Artemisa, Cuba
- Died: after 1891; Havana, Cuba
- Other names: Alejandrina Escher, Aupertina Escher
- Spouse: Vicente María Escolástico Calderón (m. 1862; died 1869)
- Children: 4, including José María Ignacio Calderón Escher
- Parent(s): Serafina (mother), Friedrich Ludwig Escher (presumed father)

Albertina Escher (c. 1842 – after 1891) was a Cuban-born woman who was freed from slavery by the will of her presumed father, Swiss coffee plantation owner Friedrich Ludwig Escher. Born on the Buen Retiro plantation near Artemisa, Cuba, she later became part of Havana's wealthy free people of color elite and inherited considerable property, including enslaved people.

== Early life and emancipation ==
Albertina Escher was born around 1842 at the Buen Retiro coffee plantation near Artemisa, Cuba, to Serafina, a criolla (Cuban-born) enslaved woman who worked as a domestic servant in the household of Friedrich Ludwig Escher (known as Fritz). Friedrich Ludwig Escher, a Swiss national from Zürich, owned the coffee plantation and was Albertina's presumed father, though his paternity was never officially established by researchers. The existence of illegitimate children of plantation owners was a widespread reality on Cuban plantations during this period.

According to the legal practices of Spanish colonial slavery, children born to enslaved women inherited their mother's status as slaves. However, fathers, referred to as "padrinos" (godfathers) in legal documents, sometimes supported their offspring financially or through social connections, even when they did not officially recognize them.

On 23 November 1845, Friedrich Ludwig Escher drew up his will, in which he freed both Serafina and Albertina from slavery. Following her emancipation, Albertina took the surname of her former owner, as was customary. After Escher's death in December 1845, Heinrich (Enrique) Steiner, the administrator of Buen Retiro who had served the plantation owner since 1839, attempted to circumvent the testamentary provisions through fraudulent means. Steiner tried to pass off Serafina as a deceased slave named Ceferina to prevent their emancipation.

However, Escher had appointed Hamburg merchant Heinrich Gätke as one of his testamentary executors with specific instructions to care for Serafina and Albertina. As a result, Serafina received the emancipation documents (libertad testamentaria) for herself and her daughter in Artemisa, along with Albertina's baptismal certificate (fe de bautismo). The birth date of 15 June 1845 indicated on the certificate was likely invented by the priest who baptized Albertina.

== Life in Havana ==
After Serafina's death on 10 November 1846, Heinrich Gätke brought Albertina Escher to Havana, where she was raised within the wealthy free people of color elite, a community that itself practiced slavery. This social group represented a complex layer of Cuban colonial society, consisting of people of African and European descent who had achieved freedom and economic success while still operating within the broader slave-based economy.

In 1862, Belén Samuel, a woman from the same social milieu, made Albertina Escher a partial heir in her will, bequeathing to her houses, stores, enslaved people, and considerable wealth. However, creditor disputes delayed the distribution of these assets until after 1891, and Albertina ultimately received only a portion of the inheritance, including enslaved individuals.

== Marriage and family ==
In 1862, Albertina Escher married Vicente María Escolástico Calderón, a skilled tailor described as a "pardo libre" (free pardo). In colonial terminology, "pardo" replaced the pejorative term "mulatto," particularly when referring to wealthy people of color. Calderón was the illegitimate son of a member of the influential and powerful Creole aristocracy of the Cuban capital.

The couple had four children and lived in a large mansion in the upscale Belén neighborhood of Havana. When her husband died in 1869, Albertina was between 24 and 27 years old. Following Vicente's death, she spent more than 20 years fighting to obtain the inheritance from Belén Samuel.

On 13 March 1891, José María Ignacio Calderón Escher, Albertina's son, had an expensive copy made of the 1862 will, in which his mother's name appeared for the last time in the historical record.

== See also ==
- Escher family

== Bibliography ==
- Barcia, María del Carmen (2009). Los ilustres apellidos: negros en La Habana colonial (in Spanish). Ediciones Boloña. ISBN 978-959-06-1207-7.
- Páez, Berta Serafina Martínez (2014). Úrsula Lambert: la singular haitiana del cafetal Angerona (in Spanish). Ediciones Boloña. ISBN 978-959-294-066-6.
- Zeuske, Michael: "Kaffee statt Zucker: Die globale commodity Kaffee und die Sklaverei auf Kuba (ca. 1790-1870)", in: Saeculum, 67/2, 2017, pp. 275–303.
- Zeuske, Michael Max Paul: "Tod bei Artemisa. Friedrich Ludwig Escher, Atlantic Slavery und die Akkumulation von Schweizer Kapital ausserhalb der Schweiz", in: Revue suisse d'histoire, 69/1, 2019, pp. 6–26.
