= Escherich =

Escherich may refer to:

- Escherich (surname), a German surname
- Organization Escherich (Orgesch), a WWII German Weimar paramilitary groups

== See also ==
- Escherichia
- Escher (disambiguation)
