= Arnold Escher von der Linth =

Swiss geologist

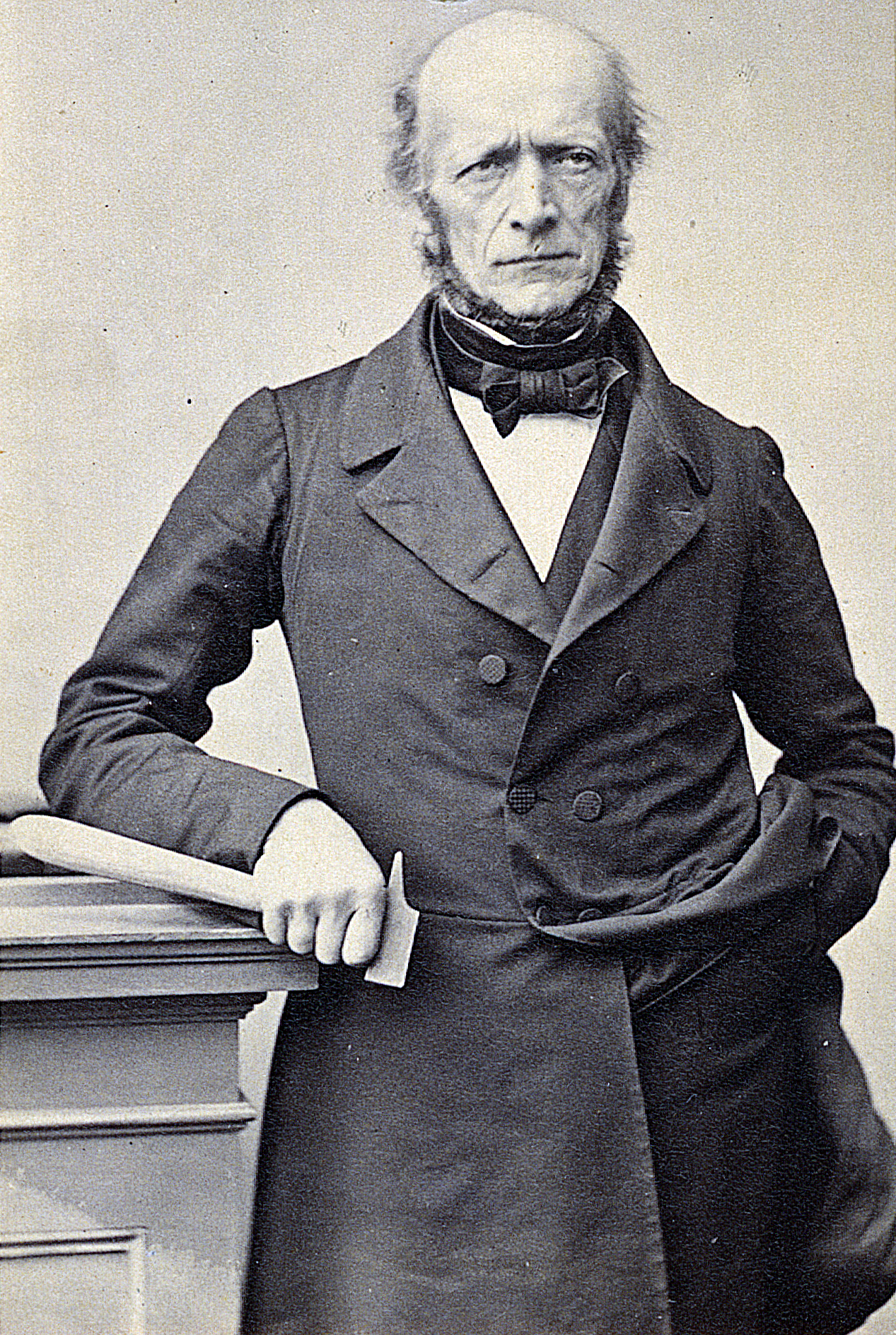
Photograph of Arnold Escher von der Linth

Arnold Escher von der Linth (8 June 1807 in Zürich – 12 July 1872) was a Swiss geologist, the son of Hans Conrad Escher von der Linth (1767–1823).

Escher was the son of the state councilor Konrad who was director of the Linth prison and correctional facility. He was initially educated at home and then went to the Geneva Academy in 1825 where he attended lectures by de la Rive, de Candolle, Vaucher, and Nicolas Theodore de Saussure. After completing military service, his interest in geology made him enrol at the university of Berlin along with Johann Kaspar Bluntschli. Here he met and interacted with Leopold von Buch, Alexander von Humboldt and others. He travelled around Europe in 1829 and 1830. He travelled to the Italian alps with Karl Friedrich Vollrath Hoffmann, and this was followed by trips to Sicily and Vesuvius. He made the first ascent of the Lauteraarhorn on 8 August 1842 together with Pierre Jean Édouard Desor and Christian Girard, and guides Melchior Bannholzer and Jakob Leuthold.

In 1833, following the establishment of the university in Zurich, where he became a private lecturer in 1834. Lorenz Oken received the professor position in natural science and it was only in 1856 that he became professor of geology at the École Polytechnique in Zürich and established the Geological Institute there. His researches led him to be regarded as one of the founders of Swiss geology.

With Bernhard Studer, he was the first to systematically explore the geology of the Swiss Alps and its neighboring regions (eastern Switzerland, Vorarlberg, Tyrol, Piedmont and Lombardy). Also with Studer, he produced a highly acclaimed geological map of Switzerland (1853).

In particular, his scientific liaison with the Scottish geologist Roderick Murchison (1792–1871) made him a contributor to the discovery of the Silurian system, and the first systematic description of sedimentary rocks and their index fossils.

He was the author of Geologische Bemerkungen über das nordliche Vorarlberg und einige angrenzenden Gegenden (Geological observations on the northern Vorarlberg and some adjacent areas), published at Zürich in 1853.
