= Esher (disambiguation) =

Esher is a town in Surrey, England. It can also mean:

== Places ==
- Esher Township, Quebec, Canada, part of Sheenboro, Quebec

=== Surrey, England, UK ===
- Esher College, a college in Thames Ditton
- Esher Commons, several large wooded areas to the south-west of Esher
- Esher (UK Parliament constituency)
- Esher and Walton (UK Parliament constituency)
- Esher News & Mail
- Esher railway station
- Esher RFC, a rugby union club

== People ==
=== People with the surname Esher ===
- Viscount Esher, a Peerage title of Esher, Surrey, England, held by:
  - William Brett, 1st Viscount Esher (1815–1899)
  - Reginald Brett, 2nd Viscount Esher (1852–1930)
  - Oliver Balliol Brett, 3rd Viscount Esher (1881–1963)
  - Lionel Brett, 4th Viscount Esher (1913–2004)
  - Christopher Brett, 5th Viscount Esher (born 1936); see Viscount Esher
- Richard Drake of Esher, Surrey, (1535–1603)

=== Fictional characters ===
- Esher (Myst), a character from the video game Myst V: End of Ages

== Other uses ==
- Esher Report, of 1904

== See also ==
- Escher (disambiguation)
