= Escherich (surname) =

Escherich is a German surname. Notable people with the surname include:

- Georg Escherich (1870–1941), German politician
- Gustav von Escherich (1849–1935), Austrian mathematician
- Karl Escherich (1871-1951), German entomologist
- Theodor Escherich (1857–1911), German-Austrian pediatrician, discoverer of the bacterium Escherichia coli
