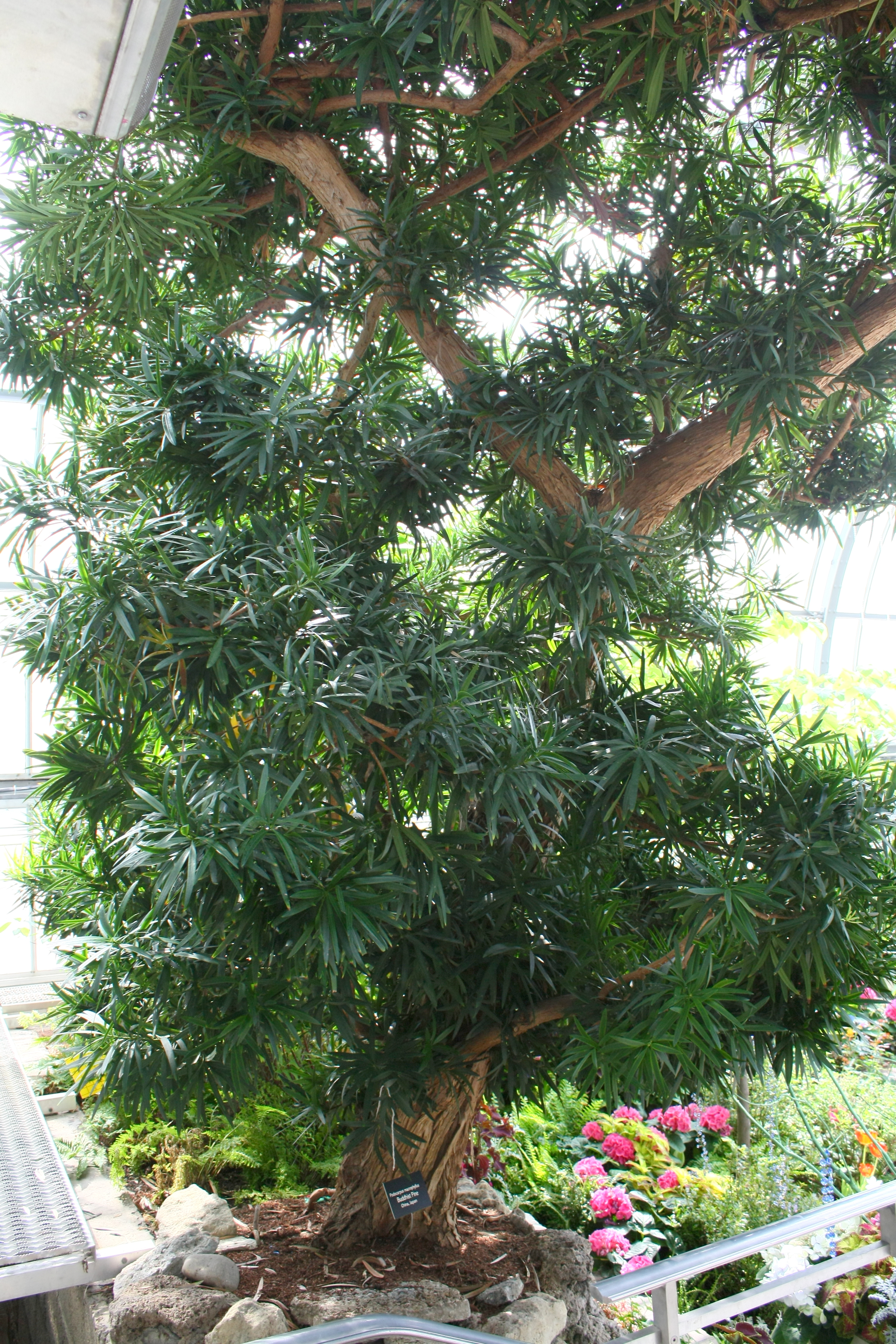

Conservation status
- Least Concern (IUCN 3.1)

Scientific classification
- Kingdom: Plantae
- Clade: Tracheophytes
- Clade: Gymnosperms
- Division: Pinophyta
- Class: Pinopsida
- Order: Araucariales
- Family: Podocarpaceae
- Genus: Podocarpus
- Species: P. macrophyllus

Binomial name
- Podocarpus macrophyllus (Thunb.) Sweet

Varieties
- Podocarpus macrophyllus var. macrophyllus; Podocarpus macrophyllus var. maki Siebold & Zucc.

Synonyms
- Margbensonia macrophylla (Thunb.) A.V.Bobrov & Melikyan; Margbensonia sweetii (C.Presl) A.V.Bobrov & Melikyan; Nageia macrophylla (Thunb.) F.Muell.; Podocarpus sweetii C.Presl; Taxus macrophylla Thunb.

= Podocarpus macrophyllus =

Species of coniferous tree

Podocarpus macrophyllus, the yew plum pine, Buddhist pine, fern pine or Japanese yew, is a conifer in the family Podocarpaceae. It is the northernmost species of the family, native to southern Japan and southern and eastern China. Kusamaki (クサマキ) and inumaki (犬槇) are Japanese names for this tree. In China, it is known as luóhàn sōng (羅漢松), which literally means "arhat pine".

== Description ==
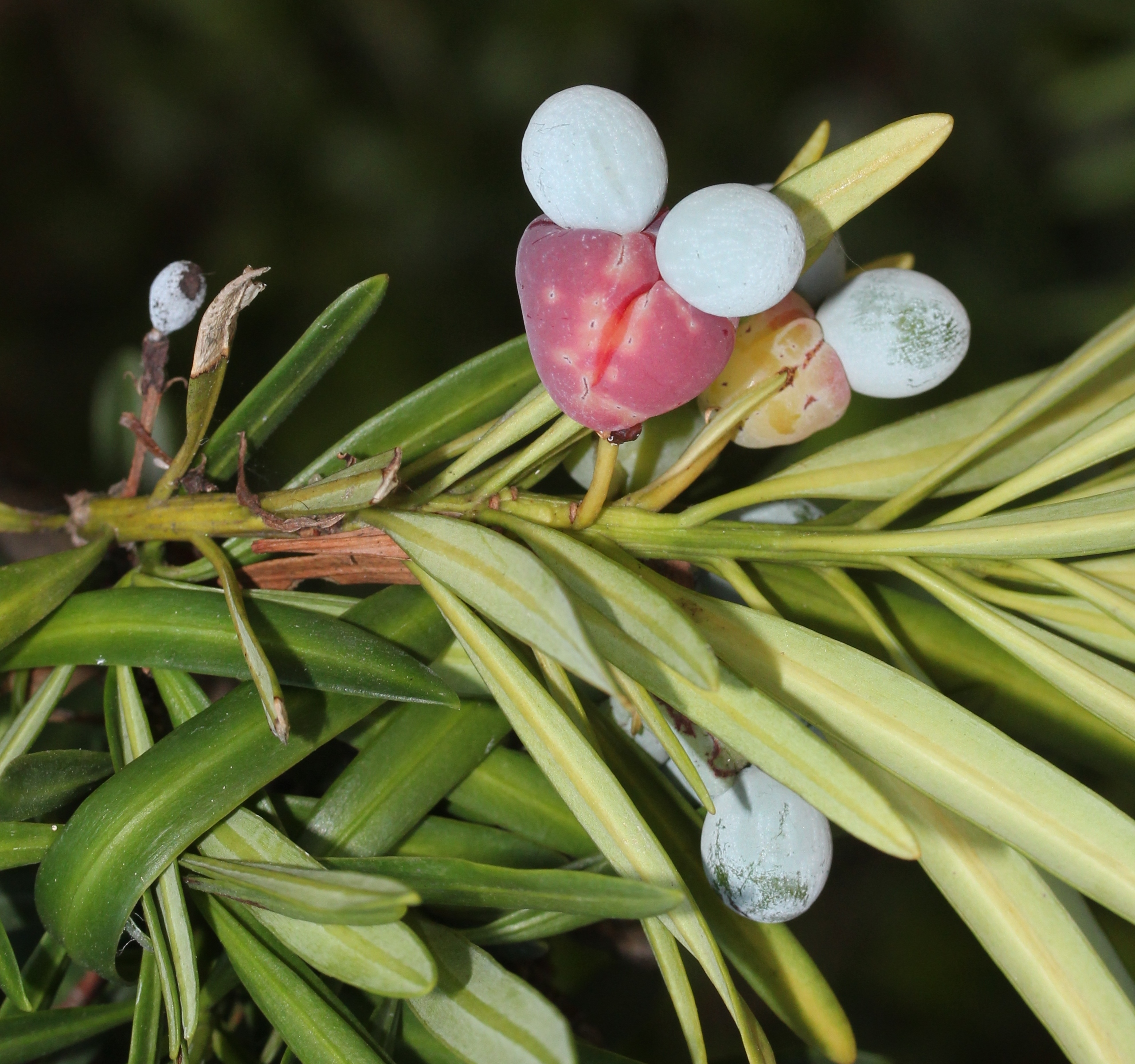
P. macrophyllus seed cones with two seeds

It is a small to medium-sized coniferous tree, reaching 20 m (66 ft) tall. The leaves are strap-shaped, 6–12 cm (2.4–4.7 in) long, and about 1 cm broad, with a central midrib. The cones are borne on a short stem, and have two to four scales, usually only one (sometimes two) fertile, each fertile scale bearing a single apical seed 10–15 mm. When mature, the scales swell up and become reddish purple, fleshy, and berry-like, 10–20 mm long; they are then eaten by birds, which disperse the seeds in their droppings.

P. macrophyllus occurs in forests, open thickets, and roadsides from near sea level to 1,000 m (3,300 ft) above it.

== Varieties ==
Two varieties are accepted.

- Podocarpus macrophyllus var. macrophyllus – southern China, southern Taiwan, and Japan (Honshu and Shikoku)
- Podocarpus macrophyllus var. maki Siebold & Zucc. (synonym P. chinensis Wall. ex Benn.) – southern China, northern Myanmar, Taiwan, and south-central and southern Japan

== Symbolism, cultivation, and uses ==
Kusamaki is the state tree of Chiba Prefecture, Japan. It is a popular large shrub or small tree in gardens, particularly in Japan and the Southeastern United States. The ripe cone arils are edible, though the seed should not be eaten. Because of its resistance to termites and water, inumaki is used for quality wooden houses in Okinawa Prefecture, Japan.

Buddhist pine is highly regarded as a feng shui tree in Hong Kong, giving it a very high market value. In recent years, the illegal digging of Buddhist pine has become a problem in the city.

This species can be trained as a bonsai.

== Gallery ==
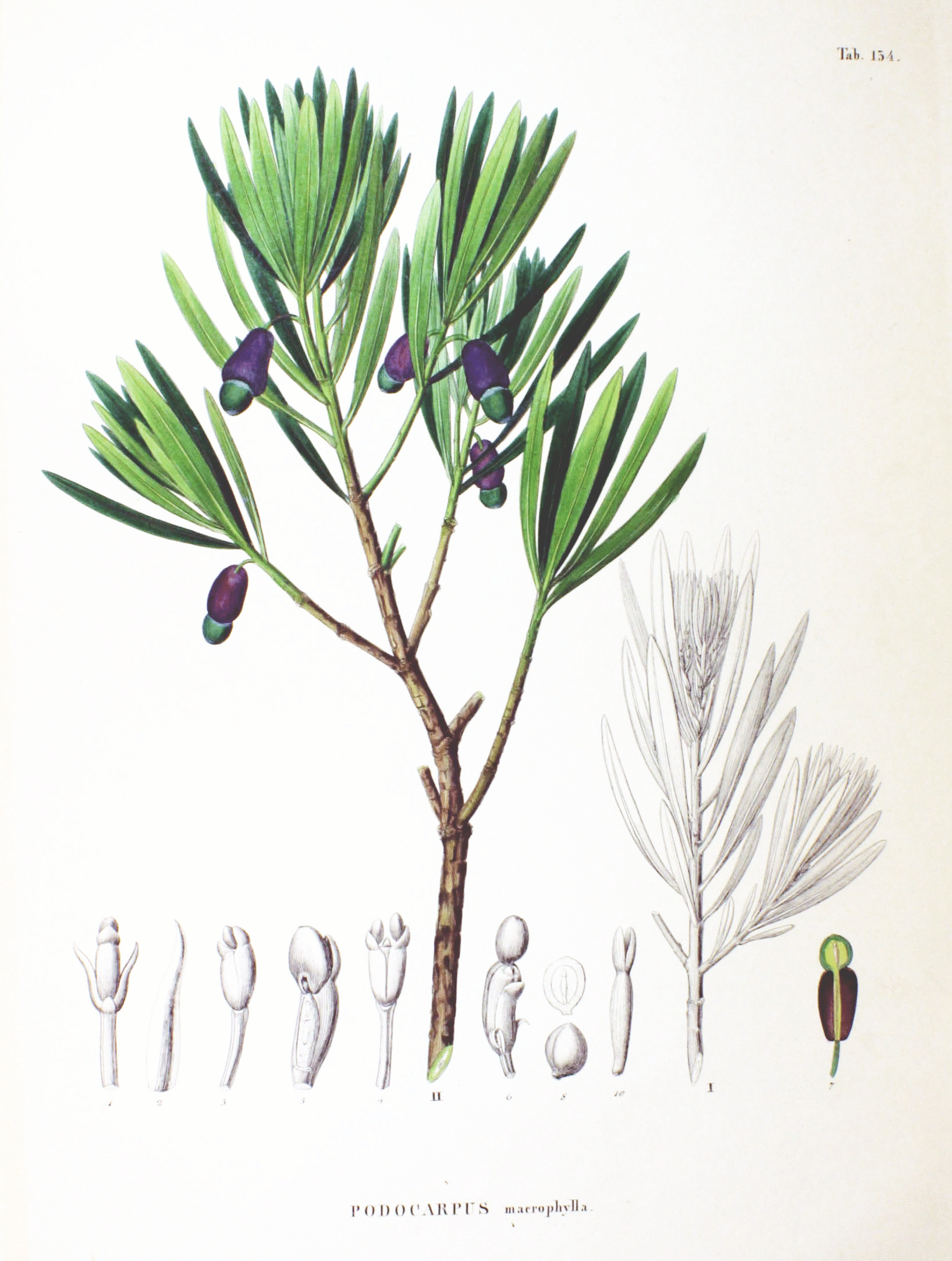
From Flora Japonica by Philipp Franz von Siebold and Joseph Gerhard Zuccarini

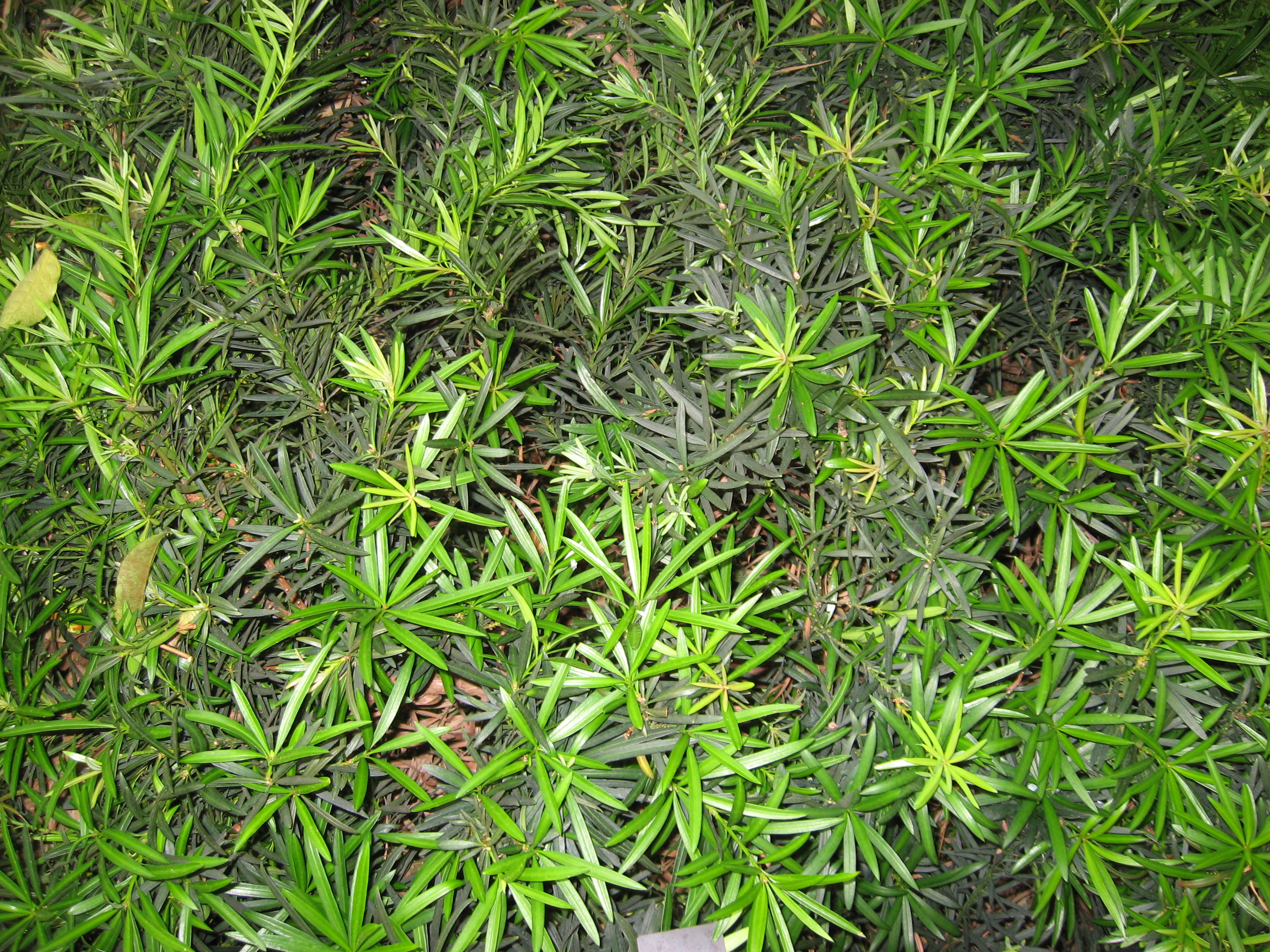
A closeup of the leaves

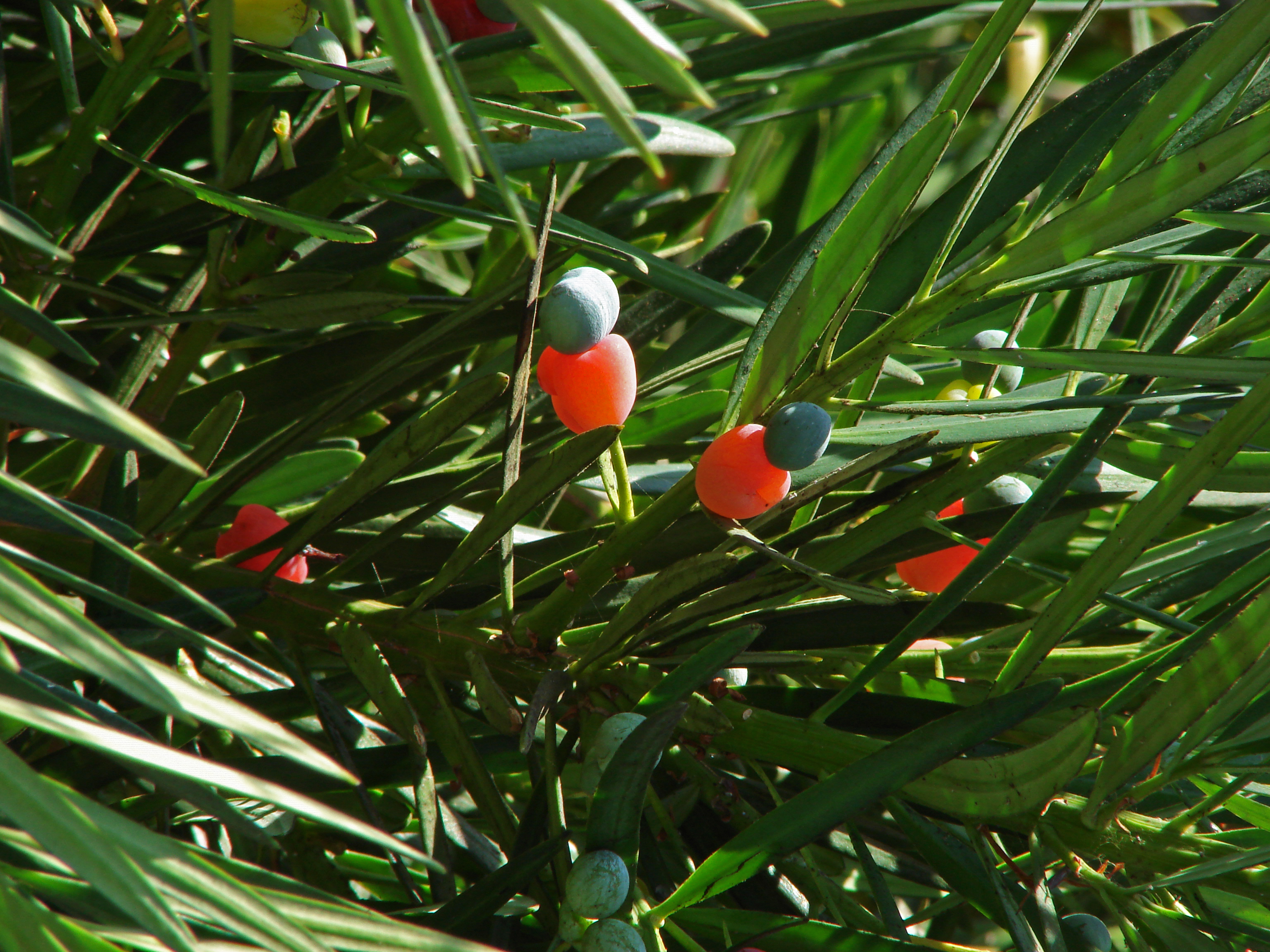
Foliage with mature seed cones

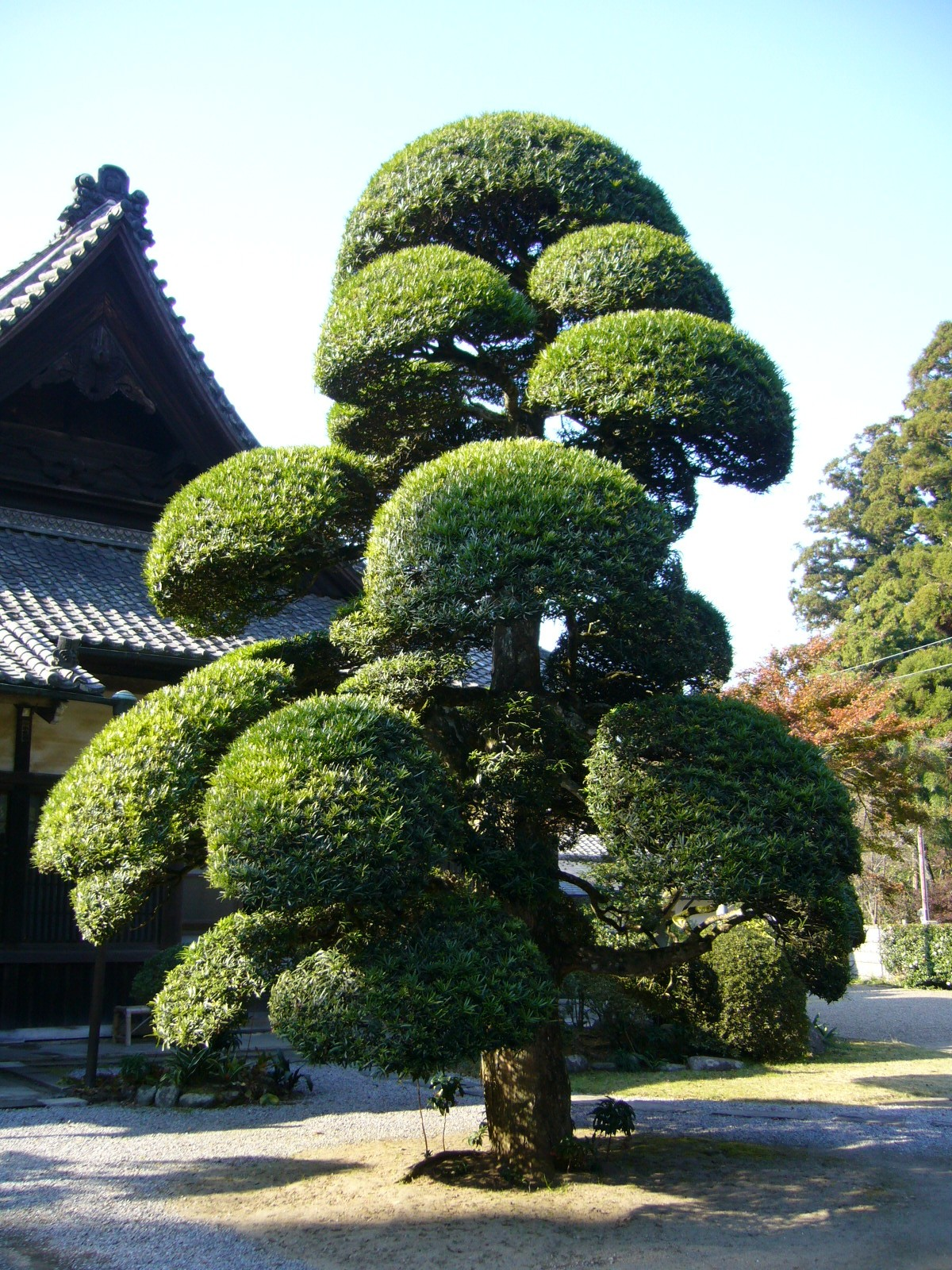
A trimmed P. macrophyllus
