= Hans Jakob Escher =

Swiss politician (1783–1854)

- Born: 15 April 1783; Zurich, Old Swiss Confederacy
- Died: 7 June 1854 (aged 71); Zurich, Switzerland
- Occupations: Merchant; judge; politician
- Spouse: Rosina Valeria Burckhardt (m. 1809; div. 1818)
- Parents: Salomon Escher (father); Margaretha Escher von Berg (mother)
- Relatives: Martin Escher (brother)

Hans Jakob Escher (15 April 1783 – 7 June 1854), also known as Hans Jakob Escher vom Glas, was a Swiss merchant, judge and politician from Zurich, a member of the Escher family. He was a member of the cantonal Grand Council from 1818 to 1849 and mayor (Stadtpräsident) of Zurich from 1831 to 1837.

== Biography ==
Hans Jakob Escher was born on 15 April 1783 in Zurich, the son of Salomon Escher, guild master (Zunftmeister) of the Zunft zur Meisen and silk manufacturer in the Wollenhof, and Margaretha Escher von Berg. In 1809 he married Rosina Valeria Burckhardt, daughter of Rudolf Burckhardt and Sara Ronus; they divorced in 1818.

Escher worked as a merchant in the silk fabric factory in the Wollenhof in Zurich. In 1813 he handed the firm over to his two younger brothers, Heinrich and Martin. From then on he ran his own colonial goods business in the Baumwollhof.

From 1820 to 1823 Escher was a district judge (Amtsrichter), from 1821 to 1823 vice-president of the district court (Amtsgericht), and from 1824 to 1830 a judge of the cantonal high court (Oberrichter). He was a member of the Grand Council (Grosser Rat) from 1818 to 1849 and mayor of Zurich from 1831 to 1837. From 1833 to 1851 he was a member of the school council (Schulrat) of the city of Zurich. He died in Zurich on 7 June 1854.

== Bibliography ==
- Karl Keller-Escher, 560 Jahre aus der Geschichte der Familie Escher vom Glas, 1320–1885, n.d.
