= Jutta Escher =

German-American physicist

Jutta E. Escher is a theoretical nuclear physicist whose research concerns the calculation of cross sections of nuclear reactions, with applications including astrophysics, nuclear power, radiochemistry, and national security, including in particular "indirect measurements of neutron-induced reactions". Originally from Germany, and educated in Germany and the United States, she has worked in Israel, Canada, and the United States, where she is a staff scientist at the Lawrence Livermore National Laboratory.

== Education and career ==
In Germany, Escher was a student at the Kant-Gymnasium Boppard and at the University of Bonn, where she received a vordiplom in 1988. She became a graduate student of physics at Louisiana State University, supported by a Fulbright Scholarship, where she received a master's degree in 1993 and completed her Ph.D. in 1997. Her dissertation was Electron scattering studies in the framework of the symplectic shell model.

After postdoctoral research in Israel, at the Hebrew University of Jerusalem, and in Canada, at the TRIUMF national particle accelerator center, she joined the Lawrence Livermore National Laboratory in 2002, in its Physical and Life Sciences Directorate.

== Recognition ==
Escher was elected as a Fellow of the American Physical Society in 2019, "for developing the theoretical framework required to validate the surrogate reaction method for neutron-induced reactions and for leading the applications of these methods to address important questions in nuclear astrophysics and stewardship science".
