= Jean Pierre Étienne Vaucher =

Swiss botanist (1763–1841)

Jean Pierre Étienne Vaucher (17 April 1763 – 5 or 6 January 1841) was a Swiss Protestant pastor and botanist who was a native of the Republic of Geneva.

He studied theology at Geneva, and from 1795 to 1821 was a pastor at the Church of Saint-Gervais. From 1808 to 1840 he was a professor of church history at the University of Geneva, and for a number of years he also taught classes in botany. Among his better-known students were botanist Augustin Pyramus de Candolle (1778-1841), scientist Hans Conrad Escher von der Linth (1767-1823) and Charles-Albert (1798-1849), the future King of Sardinia.

Vaucher is remembered for his research involving the developmental history of algae. In his 1803 treatise Histoire des Conferves d'eau douce, he described the process of conjugation in certain algae as a distinct sexual process. The phenomena of conjugation is a means of fertilization that takes place in green algae such as Spirogyra. He is credited for describing the development of the networks that occur in the cells of Hydrodictyon (water net algae), and for describing the pyrenoid of algae.

He is honoured in the name of 2 genera of yellow-green algae, Vaucheria, named by Augustin Pyramus de Candolle in 1801. As well as Vaucheriella, published by François Benjamin Gaillon in 1833.

== Selected publications ==
- Histoire des conferves d'eau douce (1803)
- Histoire physiologique des plantes de l'Europe, 4 volumes (1804)
- Mémoire sur les seiches du lac de Genève (1805)
- Monographie des orobanches (1827)
- Souvenir d'un Pasteur Genevois, ou recueil de sermons (1842)
