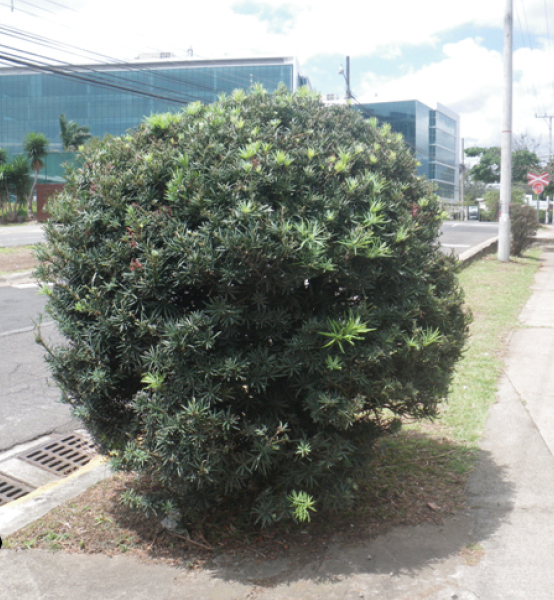

Conservation status
- Near Threatened (IUCN 3.1)

Scientific classification
- Kingdom: Plantae
- Clade: Tracheophytes
- Clade: Gymnosperms
- Division: Pinophyta
- Class: Pinopsida
- Order: Araucariales
- Family: Podocarpaceae
- Genus: Podocarpus
- Species: P. macrophyllus
- Variety: P. m. var. maki

Trinomial name
- Podocarpus macrophyllus var. maki Siebold & Zucc.

Synonyms
- Synonymy: Juniperus chinensis Roxb.; Margbensonia chinensis (Wall. ex Benn.) A.V.Bobrov & Melikyan; Margbensonia maki (Siebold & Zucc.) A.V.Bobrov & Melikyan; Myrica esquirolii H.Lév.; Nageia appressa (Maxim.) Kuntze; Nageia chinensis (Wall. ex Benn.) Kuntze; Nageia corrugata (Gordon) Kuntze; Nageia flagelliformis (Carrière) Kuntze; Nageia japonica (Siebold ex Endl.) Kuntze; Nageia macrophylla var. maki (Siebold & Zucc.) Voss; Podocarpus appressus Maxim.; Podocarpus chinensis Wall. ex Benn.; Podocarpus chinensis var. appressus (Maxim.) Matsum.; Podocarpus chinensis var. argenteus Gordon; Podocarpus chinensis var. aureus Gordon; Podocarpus chinensis var. wardii de Laub. & Silba; Podocarpus chinensis subsp. wardii (de Laub. & Silba) Silba; Podocarpus corrugatus Gordon; Podocarpus flagelliformis Carrière; Podocarpus japonicus Siebold ex Endl.; Podocarpus lanceolatus Gordon & Glend.; Podocarpus macrophyllus var. appressus (Maxim.) Matsum.; Podocarpus macrophyllus var. chinensis (Wall. ex Benn.) Maxim.; Podocarpus macrophyllus subsp. maki (Siebold & Zucc.) Pilg.; Podocarpus maki (Siebold & Zucc.) Pickering; Podocarpus makoyi Blume; Podocarpus miquelia Parl.; Taxus chinensis Roxb.

= Podocarpus macrophyllus var. maki =

Species of conifer

Podocarpus macrophyllus var. maki is a variety of conifer in the family Podocarpaceae. It is a variety of Podocarpus macrophyllus native to southern China, northern Myanmar, Taiwan, and south-central and southern Japan.

Podocarpus macrophyllus var. maki is a coniferous tree growing up to 15 metres tall. Its branches are strong and horizontal with dense branchlets. Leaves are thick and leathery and spirally arranged, up to 18 × 1 cm, bright green above and glaucous beneath. It varies from P. macrophyllus var. macrophyllus only in leaf width and receptacle color.

== Etymology ==
Podocarpus is derived from Greek, meaning ‘stalked fruit’. It was named in reference to the fleshy fruit stalks of some species.
