= Hans Conrad Escher von der Linth =

Swiss politician and artist (1767-1823)

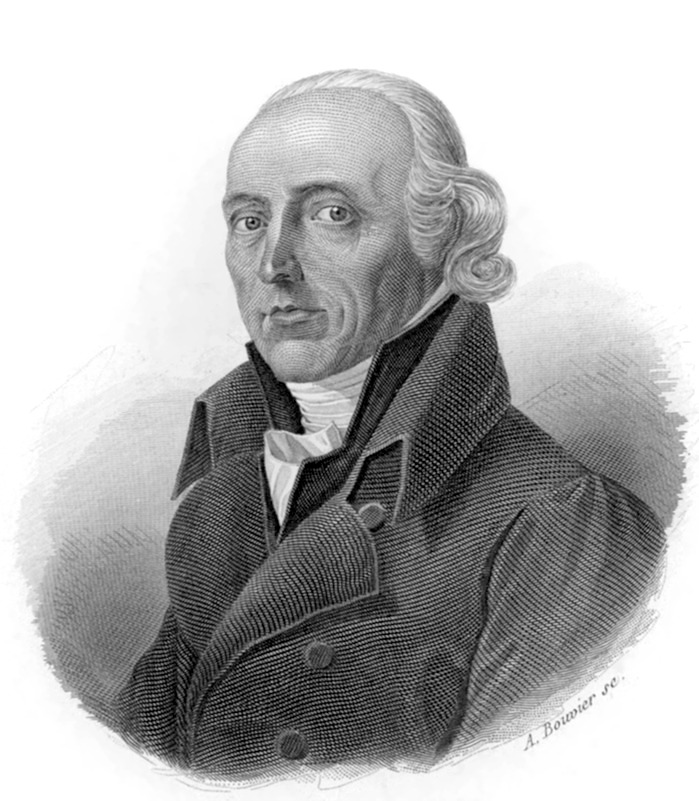
- Escher around 1820
- Born: 24 August 1767; Zurich, Switzerland
- Died: 9 March 1823 (aged 55); Zurich, Switzerland
- Occupations: Politician, engineer, geologist, artist
- Known for: Linth correction
- Spouse: Regula von Orelli
- Children: Arnold Escher von der Linth

Hans Conrad Escher von der Linth (24 August 1767 – 9 March 1823) was a Swiss politician, engineer, geologist and artist. During the Helvetic Republic, he held senior political office. He later led the Linth River project. It was Switzerland's first major public project carried out on a national scale. The work reduced flooding in the Linth plain and drained areas that had been waterlogged. Escher also conducted extensive geological research in the Swiss Alps. More than 1,000 drawings and watercolours survive from his work, and he is considered a pioneer of Alpine panorama art.

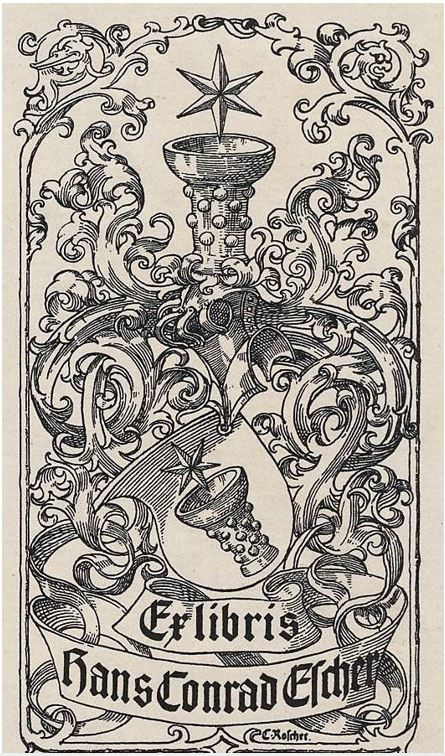
Escher family coat of arms

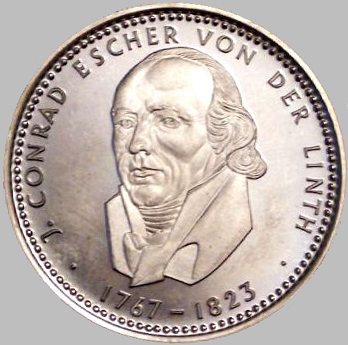
Commemorative medal honouring Escher

== Biography ==
Hans Conrad Escher von der Linth was born on 24 August 1767 in Zurich. His parents were Hans Kaspar Escher, a textile manufacturer and member of the Zurich government, and Anna Dorothea Landolt. In 1789, he married Regula von Orelli, whose father, Salomon von Orelli, served in the Zurich government.

Escher spent part of his education in Geneva and subsequently travelled through France, England, Germany, and Italy. While in Geneva, Escher developed a strong interest in the Alps, influenced in particular by the writings of Horace-Bénédict de Saussure. In 1785, he made his first Alpine excursion with his tutor, the biologist Jean-Pierre-Étienne Vaucher.

He later studied for two semesters at Göttingen. There, he studied natural sciences, with Georg Christoph Lichtenberg among his teachers. Escher also received drawing instruction from the Zurich artist Johann Balthasar Bullinger. After completing his travels and education, he worked in his father’s business while continuing to develop his interests in science, geology and philosophy.

Escher’s national political career began in 1798, when he was elected to the Helvetic Great Council and chosen as its president. He was appointed to the Legislative Council in 1800 and to the Small Council in 1802. After stepping back from politics in 1803, he resumed public service in 1814 as a member of Zurich’s Great Council and Small Council, and later its State Council. He died in Zurich on 9 March 1823.

== Career ==
=== Politics ===
From 1798 to 1802, Escher was politically active in Aarau, Lucerne and Bern during the Helvetic Republic. From 1798 to 1801, he co-edited the newspaper Der schweizerische Republikaner with Paul Usteri. While serving on the Helvetic Small Council in 1802, he oversaw military affairs. As a geographical expert, he served on commissions responsible for dividing the cantons into districts.

In Zurich, Escher gave public lectures on politics and economics and later served on the cantonal education council. He was one of the founders of Zurich’s Political Institute and later lectured there on statistics and economics.

=== Geological work ===
Between 1791 and 1822, Escher made 191 geological field trips, most of them in the Swiss Alps. He published 25 papers on geology between 1795 and 1821. Escher also developed extensive knowledge of Swiss mineralogy and topography. His research into Alpine geology included the study of rock formations, folding, strata and faults, and contributed to the understanding of Swiss geology. In 1809, Escher described an unusual arrangement of rock layers in the Glarus Alps, recognising that their normal order had been inverted.

Escher's travel writings, collected as Fragmente über die Naturgeschichte Helvetiens, grew to more than 1,500 pages. His Alpine fieldwork contributed to revisions in contemporary explanations of how the Alps had formed. He was also consulted on river engineering, landslides and mining. In 1821, Escher became a member of the Leopoldina. His son Arnold Escher von der Linth, who later became a geologist, accompanied him on Alpine excursions and research journeys from an early age.

=== Linth project ===
From 1807 to 1822, Escher chaired the Linth Commission and oversaw the project to regulate the Linth River. The Linth project was the first public undertaking on a nationwide scale in Switzerland. The river’s unstable course hindered shipping to Zurich and disrupted trade across the Alpine passes. Extensive deforestation in the surrounding mountains increased runoff and sediment accumulation, which impeded the river’s flow and contributed to repeated flooding of the Linth plain.

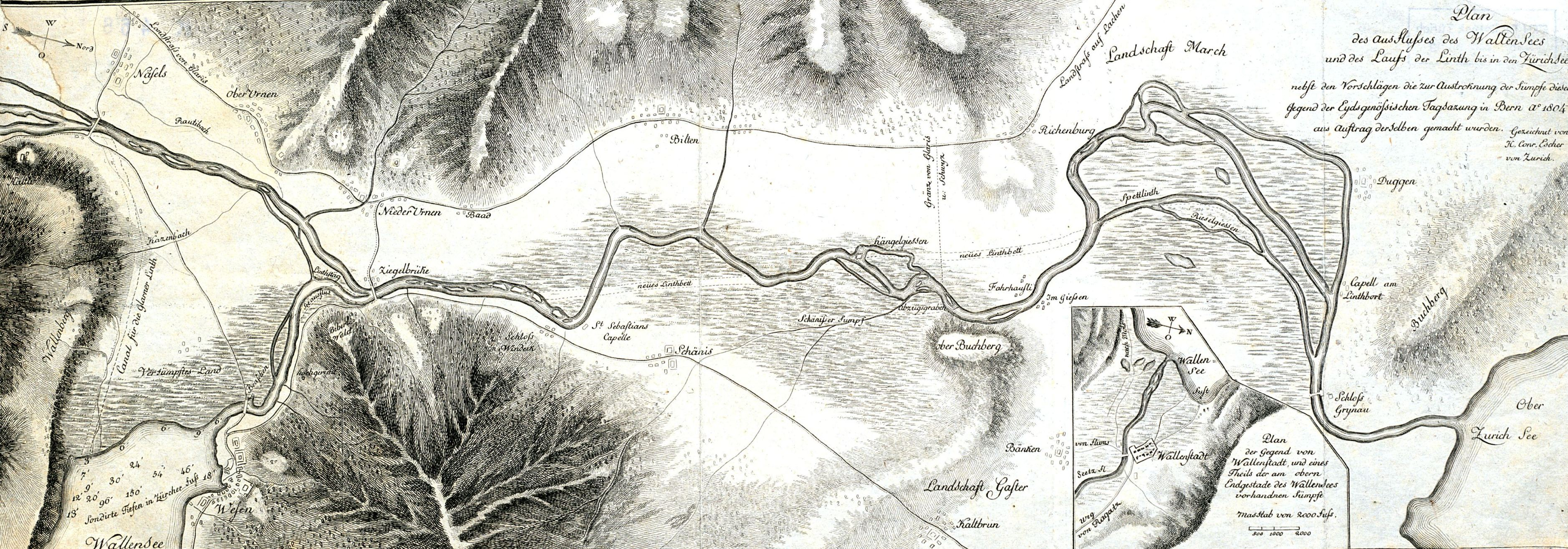
Escher's 1804 plan for the correction of the Linth between Lake Walen and Lake Zurich

Escher first saw the Linth region in 1786 while travelling as a cartographer and draughtsman. In 1804, he submitted a proposal for the project, known as Sumpfpack, to the Federal Diet. The Diet approved the project later that year, covering the course of the river between Lake Walen and the Obersee. At the time, it was unprecedented in scale as a hydraulic-engineering undertaking. In 1807, Escher issued a public appeal seeking subscriptions to finance the Linth project.

Johann Gottfried Tulla, an engineer from Baden, was brought in to develop the technical plans, which lay outside Escher’s own expertise. The final design redirected the Linth through Lake Walen, using the lake to retain sediment and moderate fluctuations in the river.

Escher was involved in the project’s financial planning from 1803 and later directed its administration and implementation. He remained closely involved in construction, negotiated the acquisition of land from local farmers and managed the project's finances. To finance the project, he sold shares tied to the future sale of reclaimed land. Construction was divided into 30-metre sections that were auctioned to subcontractors, and Escher sometimes advanced his own money when wages were delayed.

The canal system addressed repeated flooding in the Linth region, restored waterlogged land between Lake Walen and Lake Zurich to productive use, and was intended to improve local living conditions. The improved drainage also reduced mosquito breeding grounds and contributed to the disappearance of malaria from the Linth region. The Linth correction later served as a model for other hydraulic-engineering projects in Switzerland.

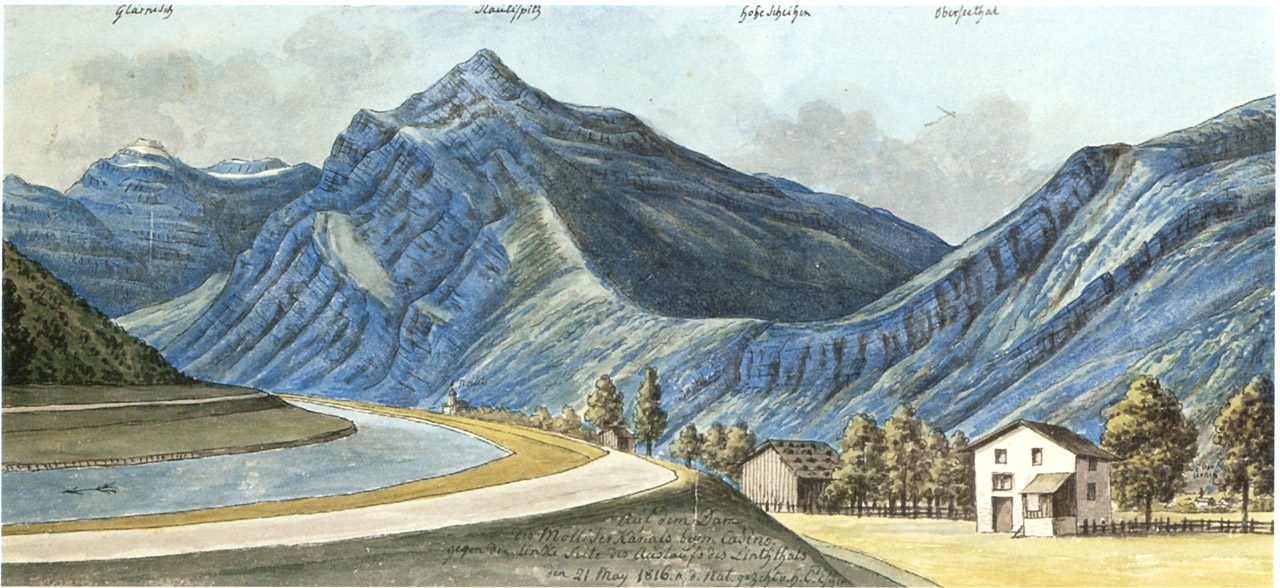
Mollis Canal at the outlet of Lake Walen, 1816

The Mollis Canal, now known as the Escher Canal, was inaugurated in 1811, followed by the Linth Canal in 1823. In 1822, Escher wrote instructions for his successors on the continued maintenance and development of the Linth works. After the participating cantons took control of the completed works, he was posthumously granted the name von der Linth, which was also bestowed on his male descendants.

=== Artistic work ===
During more than four decades of journeys through the Alps, Escher produced upwards of 1,000 drawings and watercolours. Among his works were 118 panorama drawings, including eleven that formed complete 360-degree views. He first recorded the mountain forms and geological profiles in pencil, applying colour later. Some views were completed in the field, while others were developed later from sketches and notes made during his journeys.

In addition to his geological drawings, he produced detailed views of Alpine landscapes. The works combined close scientific observation with a distinctive artistic approach. Escher’s drawings have been described as the first comprehensive geological depiction of the Swiss Alps.

Escher produced hand-drawn maps, 58 of which are held by the Zentralbibliothek Zurich. Existing cartographic material provided the basis for most of Escher’s maps, while only a small number derived from his own route surveys. Many were used on journeys, while others were made for military purposes or for the Linth project.

Escher is considered a pioneer of Alpine panorama art. A 2001 exhibition at the Swiss Alpine Museum presented Escher, Gottlieb Studer, Albert Heim and Xaver Imfeld as important practitioners of Alpine panorama art.

== Legacy ==
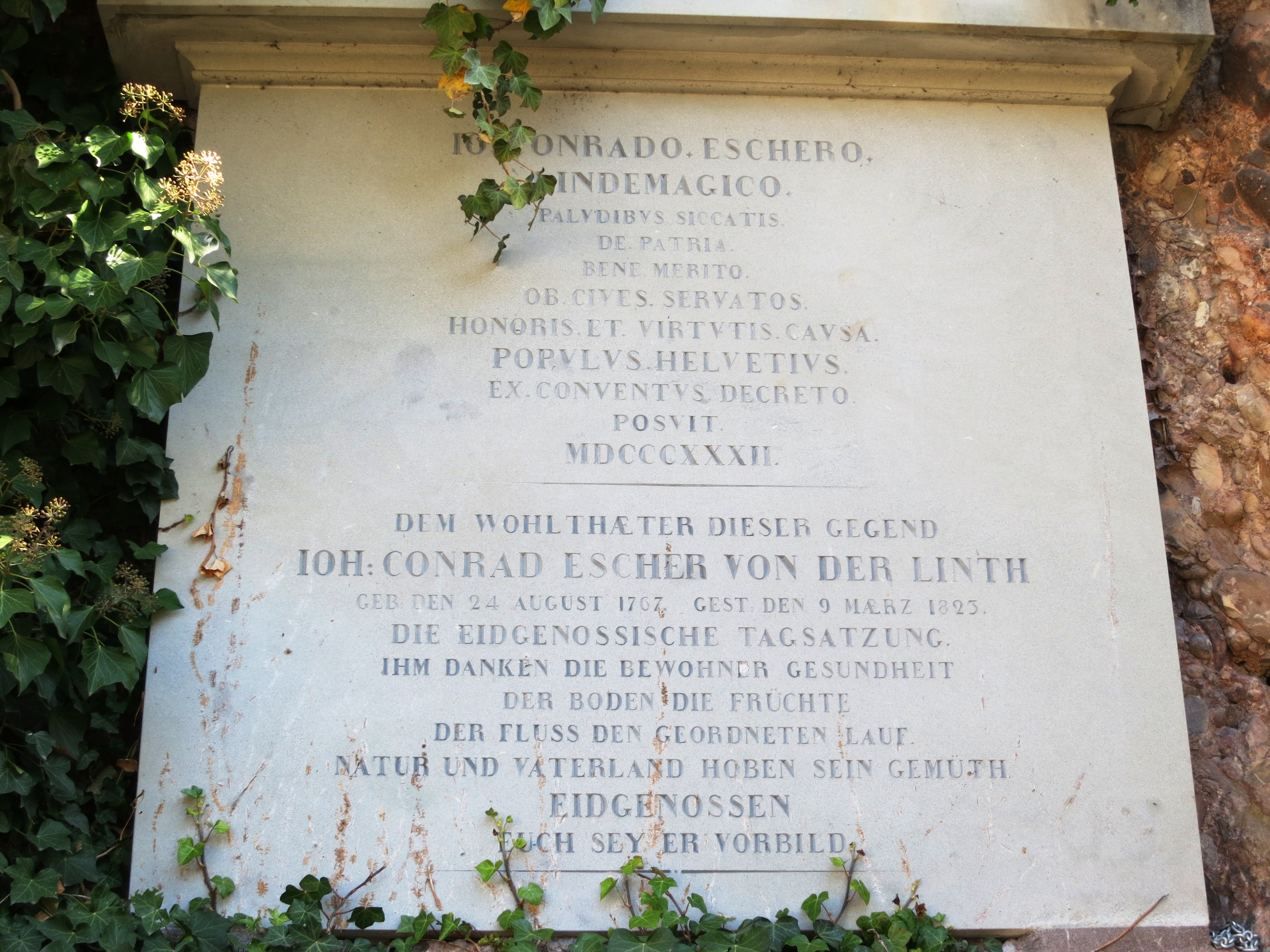
Memorial to Escher near Ziegelbrücke

Shortly after Escher’s death, the federal Diet decided that he should be publicly commemorated. After several proposals for a monument were considered, a memorial plaque was approved near Ziegelbrücke in 1832, and the Mollis Canal was officially renamed the Escher Canal. A permanent exhibition at the Linth-Escher Auditorium near Näfels presents documents from the Linth project, hydraulic-engineering tools, a model of the Linth works and a 3-D audiovisual display.

Escher’s drawings are held by ETH Zurich and the Zentralbibliothek Zurich. He left his geognostic drawings and terrain studies to his son Arnold, who later gave the collection to ETH Zurich. Around 700 of these works are now held by the Graphische Sammlung ETH Zurich. They were rediscovered there by art historian Gustav Solar in 1971. ETH Library has made books from Escher’s private library available through a dedicated collection on the e-rara platform.

== Gallery ==
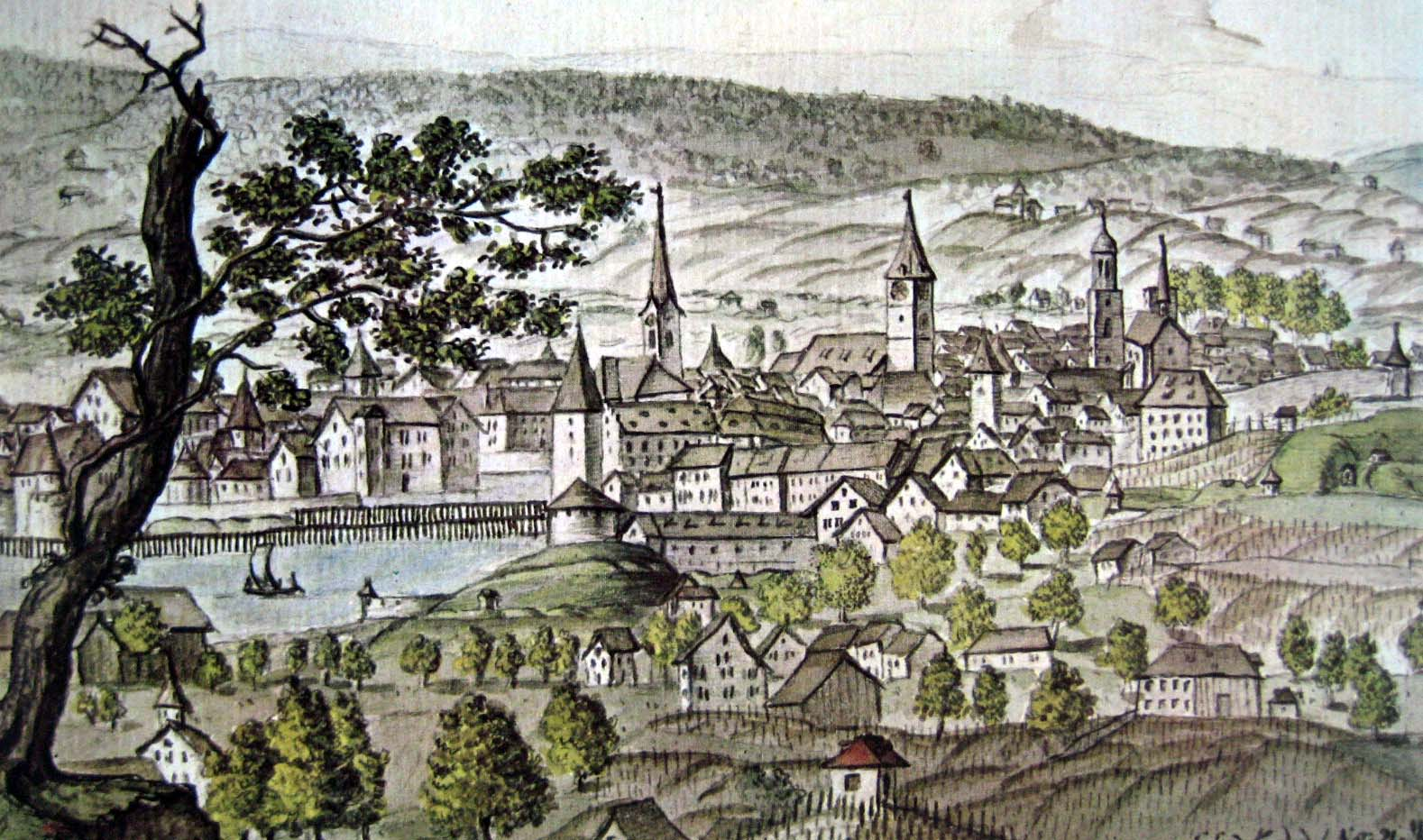
Zurich from the Burghölzli hill (1783)

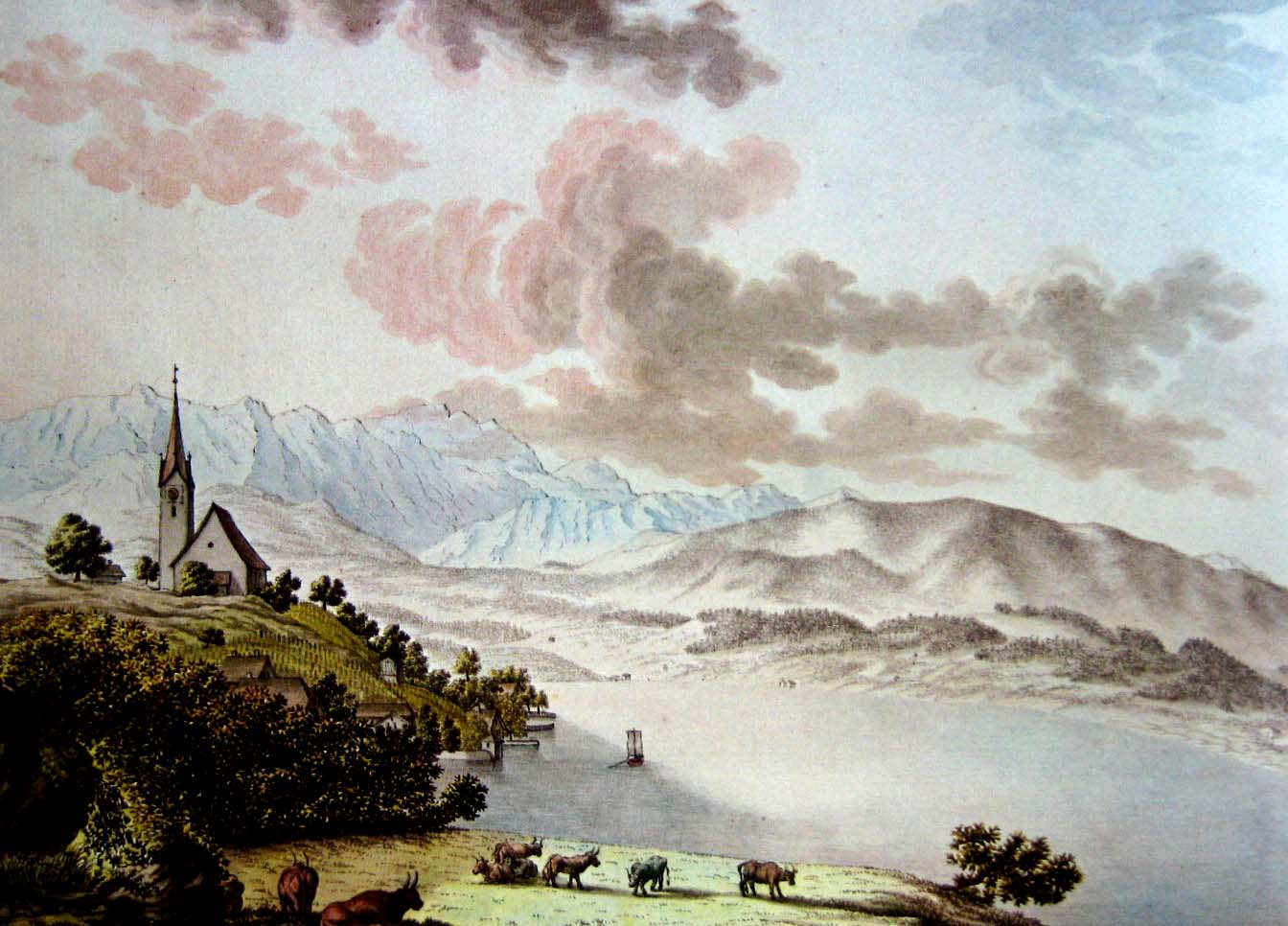
Herrliberg (1786)

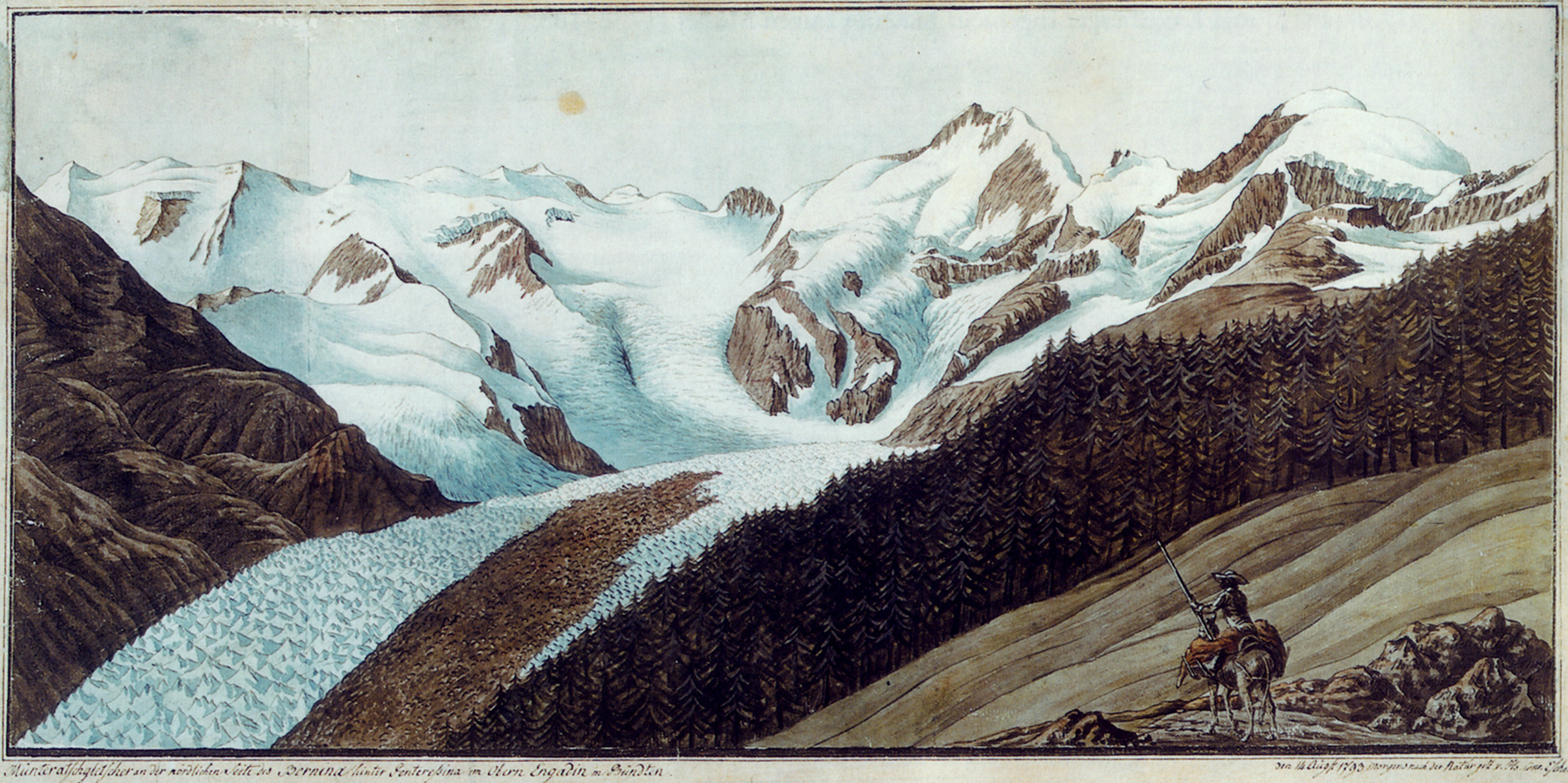
Morteratsch Glacier (1793)

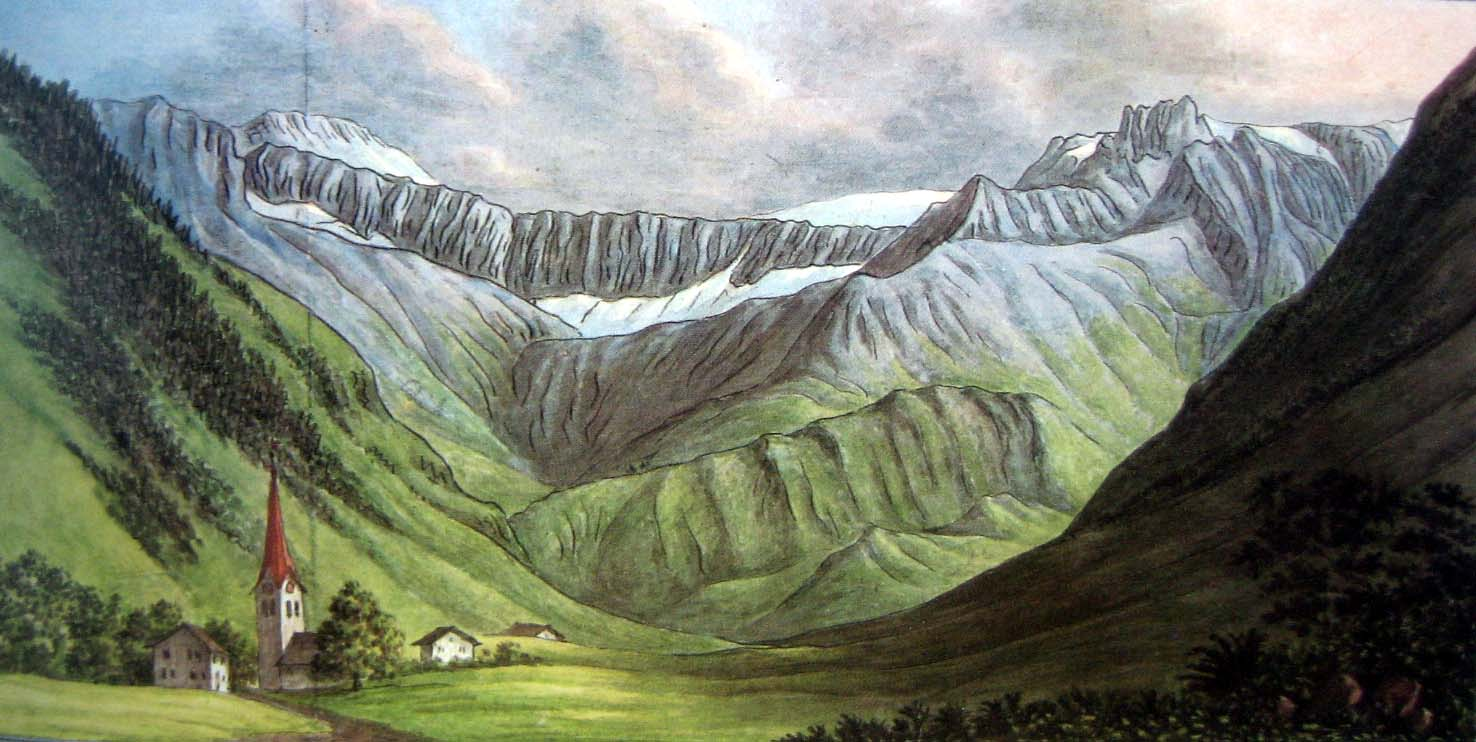
Matt in the Sernf Valley (1811)

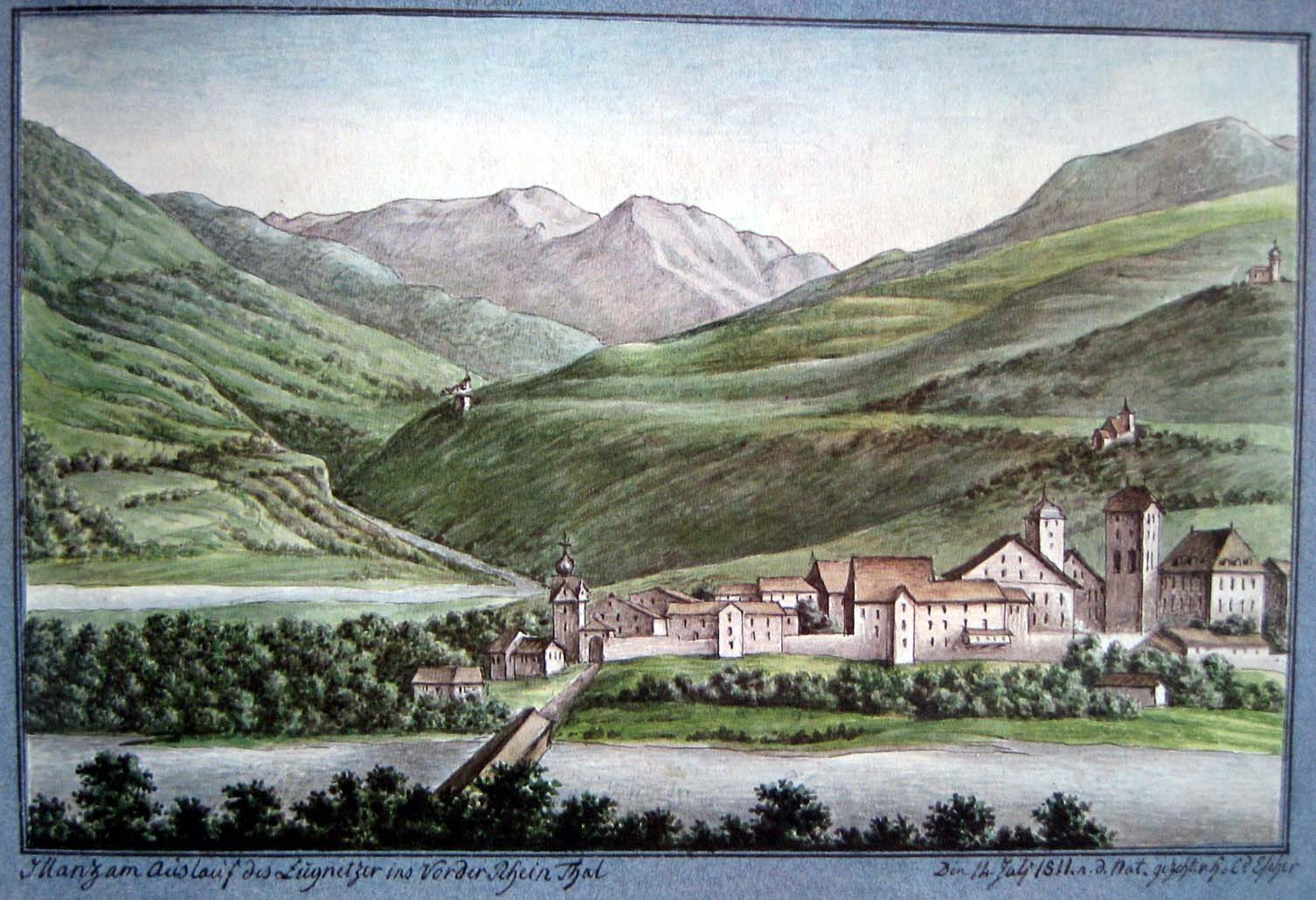
Ilanz (1811)

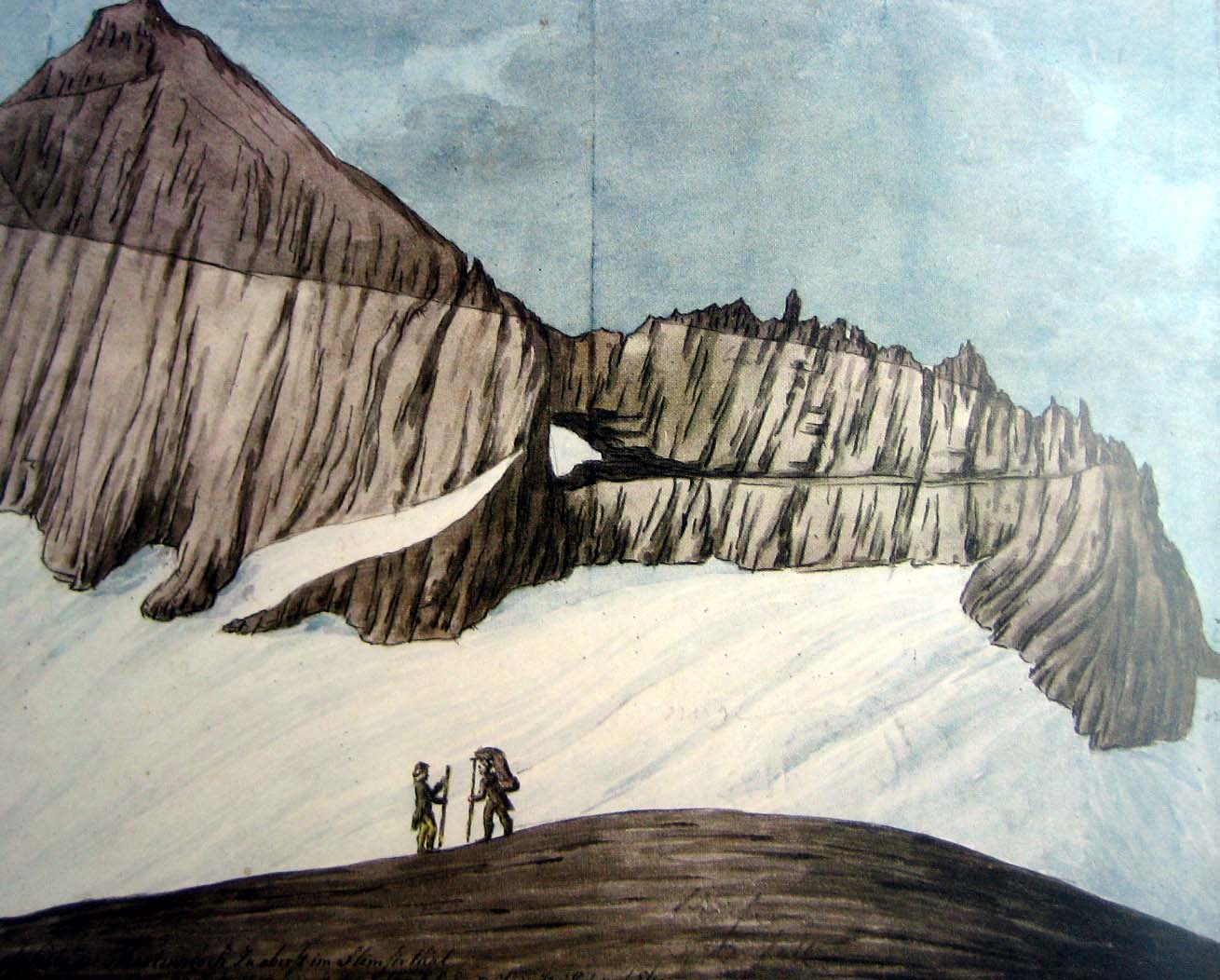
Tschingel Peaks and the Martinsloch (1812)

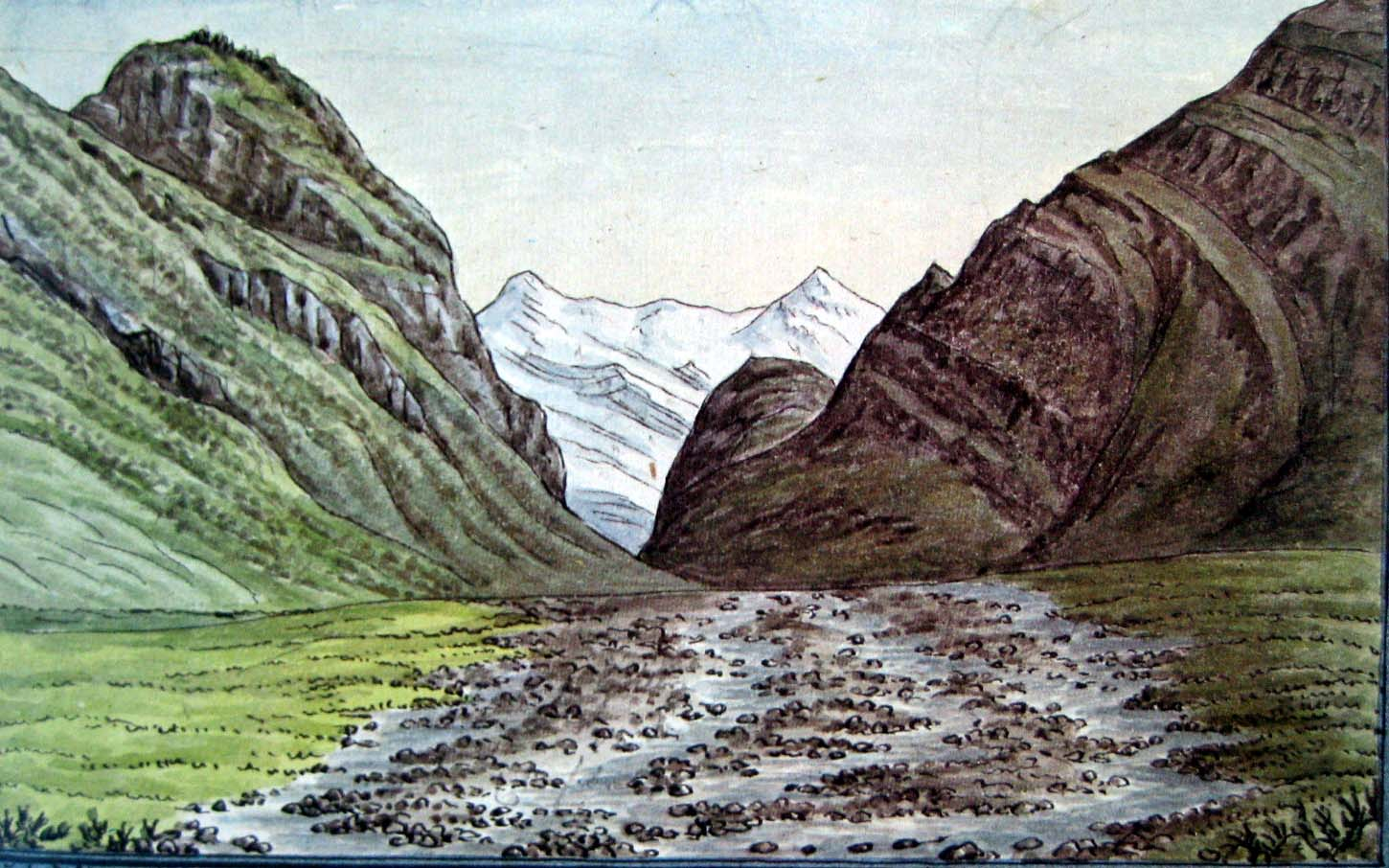
Near Landquart (1818)

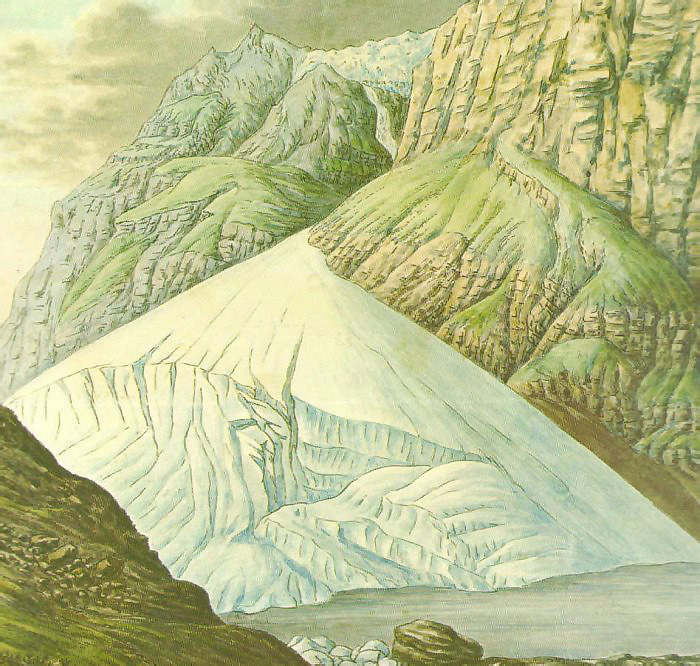
Giétro Glacier (1818)
