= Martin Escher =

Swiss silk manufacturer (1788–1870)

- Born: 7 November 1788; Zurich, Old Swiss Confederacy
- Died: 28 September 1870 (aged 81); Zurich, Switzerland
- Occupation: Silk manufacturer
- Spouse: Elisabetha Hess (m. 1816)
- Father: Salomon Escher
- Relatives: Hans Jakob Escher (brother); Kaspar Schindler (son-in-law)

Martin Escher (7 November 1788 – 28 September 1870), also known as Martin Escher vom Glas, was a Swiss silk manufacturer in Zurich. In 1834, as president of the Merchants' Directorate (Kaufmännisches Direktorium) during the negotiations on its dissolution, he pushed through the use of the funds it released for building purposes in the city. He was one of the main initiators of the Swiss Northern Railway, which opened the first railway line in Switzerland in 1847, and its director from 1846 to 1853. From 1853 to 1858 he was chairman of the board of the Swiss Northeastern Railway.

== Biography ==
Martin Escher was born on 7 November 1788 in Zurich, the son of Salomon Escher, a silk manufacturer in the Wollenhof and guild master (Zunftmeister) of the Zunft zur Meisen. His brother was Hans Jakob Escher. In 1816 he married Elisabetha Hess, daughter of Paulus Hess, a silk manufacturer in the Florhof. His daughter Elise married Kaspar Schindler in 1853.

In 1813 Escher and his brother Heinrich took over their father's firm. In the 1820s it employed more than 500 home weavers (Heimweber) and exported silk to Germany and later to the United States.

During the negotiations on the dissolution of the Merchants' Directorate in 1834, Escher was its president, and he pushed through the use of the funds thus released for building purposes in the city.

From 1842 Escher was one of the main initiators of the Swiss Northern Railway Company (Schweizerische Nordbahngesellschaft), which later became part of the Swiss Northeastern Railway (NOB). In 1847 the company opened the line from Zurich to Baden, known as the Spanisch-Brötli-Bahn, the first railway line in Switzerland. Escher was the company's director from 1846 to 1853, and from 1853 to 1858 he was chairman of the board of directors (Verwaltungsratspräsident) of the NOB. He died in Zurich on 28 September 1870.

== Bibliography ==
- C. Keller-Escher, 560 Jahre aus der Geschichte der Familie Escher vom Glas, 1320–1885, n.d., 51–53
