= Heinrich Escher =

Mayor of Zürich, Switzerland (1626–1710)

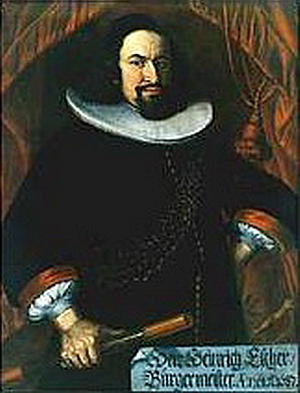

Heinrich Escher (26 July 1626 – 20 April 1710) was mayor of the City and Republic of Zürich at the turn of the 18th century. He is credited with introducing chocolate to Switzerland after learning about it in Brussels.

At the beginning of his political career in 1652 he became a representative of a guild, the Meisen, to the large council of Zurich (Zwölfer) and between 1663 and 1668 to the small council. In 1669 he became bailiff (Vogt) of Kyburg, and from 1678 until his death he was mayor of Zürich.

He was active as a merchant in the textile trade. As a representative of the buyers he was a member of the delegation for the renewal of the alliance of Zürich with Louis XIV. After the Threat of Geneva and the Waldenser taken up there and Huguenot by France, Escher in 1687 together with a representative of Bern came to the court of Louis XIV. He was sent to represent the interests of the Evangelist conditions in Zürich and Bern and the conditions Geneva allied with them.
