= Friedrich Ludwig Escher =

Swiss merchant and slaveholder (1779–1845)

Friedrich Ludwig Escher, also known as Fritz Escher and hispanized as Federico Luis Escher (21 August 1779 – 13 December 1845), was a Swiss merchant, plantation owner, and slaveholder who lived on the Buen Retiro plantation near Artemisa, Cuba.

== Life ==
=== Family ===
Friedrich Ludwig Escher was born into the Zürich-based Escher vom Glas family. He was the fourth of nine children and the third son of Hans Caspar Escher (18 March 1755, Zürich – 2 March 1831, St. Petersburg), a banker and merchant involved in the slave trade, and his wife Anna (30 June 1756, Zürich – 17 August 1836, Zürich), daughter of city captain Hans Kaspar Keller vom Steinbock (1727–1793). His siblings included Heinrich Escher and Ferdinand Escher. His nephew was Alfred Escher.

Friedrich Ludwig Escher was likely buried in Artemisa, though his grave no longer exists.

=== Career ===
In 1798, he followed his father, who, after speculating in French securities and facing bankruptcy, had left Zürich and emigrated to Russia in 1789. His brother Ferdinand later joined them. Their father became a major in the Russian army in 1792 and recruited Swiss emigrants for a colony in St. Petersburg. Friedrich Ludwig Escher and his brother also worked in St. Petersburg as emigration agents, after pursuing military and commercial careers in Russian service. Despite financial support from their brother Heinrich and the Russian state, their emigration venture, Zürichthal on the Crimean Peninsula, became a disaster for settlers in 1803/1804 and a financial failure for the Eschers. In 1810, Friedrich Ludwig Escher brought his old school friend Johannes von Muralt, a pastor, to serve the German Reformed congregation in St. Petersburg. In 1815, he and his brother Ferdinand were arrested by Russian authorities and charged with illegal trading. After their release in 1819, they managed to travel unrecognized through Zürich to Cuba, arriving in 1820 or 1821.

In Cuba, with financial support from their brother Heinrich, they likely purchased the Buen Retiro coffee plantation near Artemisa in 1821 from Hans Heinrich Studer (Stouder) of Winterthur and possibly another owner, Martin Stouder. Though smaller than other regional plantations, Buen Retiro was profitable due to its proximity to other coffee plantations and shared transport routes to the ports of Havana and Mariel. Experienced enslaved men, women, and children were employed in coffee production. Around 1822, the plantation had 82 field slaves and five house slaves. In 1826, Ferdinand Escher returned to Zürich, while Friedrich Ludwig Escher remained in Cuba. He lived on the plantation and in nearby Artemisa, employing a manager named Heinrich (Enrique) Steiner from 1839 but overseeing operations himself. Until his death in 1845, he successfully managed production, sales, and the plantation’s maintenance and development.

In his 1845 will, Friedrich Ludwig Escher listed 86 enslaved individuals. After his death in 1846, an inventory of his estate was compiled, including the land, buildings, mansion, equipment, crops, livestock, and a townhouse in Artemisa, along with the enslaved men, women, and children. He bequeathed the Artemisa townhouse and its land to his manager; the remaining estate, valued at nearly 40,000 silver pesos, was left to Heinrich Escher in Zürich.

He freed Serafina (1824–1846), a house slave, and her daughter Albertina Escher (c. 1842 – after 1891 in Havana), baptized in June 1845, in 1845. He was likely Albertina’s father, though paternity was not definitively established.

== See also ==
- Slavery in Cuba

== Bibliography ==
- Friedrich Ludwig Escher. In: C. Keller-Escher: Fünfhundert und sechzig Jahre aus der Geschichte der Familie Escher vom Glas, Teil 2 Genealogie. Zürich 1885. Family tree 10, no. 184 (Digital copy).
- Friedrich Ludwig Escher. In: Michael Max Paul Zeuske: Tod bei Artemisa: Friedrich Ludwig Escher, Atlantic Slavery und die Akkumulation von Schweizer Kapital ausserhalb der Schweiz. In: Schweizerische Zeitschrift für Geschichte, Volume 69. 2019. pp. 6–26 (Digital copy).
- Friedrich Ludwig Escher. In: Marcel Brengard, Frank Schubert, Lukas Zürcher: Die Beteiligung der Stadt Zürich sowie der Zürcherinnen und Zürcher an Sklaverei und Sklavenhandel vom 17. bis ins 19. Jahrhundert. Bericht zu Handen des Präsidialdepartements der Stadt Zürich. Zürich 2020. pp. 36–38 (Digital copy).
- Michael Zeuske. "Friedrich Ludwig Escher" [Friedrich Ludwig Escher]. Historical Dictionary of Switzerland.
