= Widmann =

Widmann is a German surname. Notable people with the surname include:

- Albert Widmann (1912–1986), German chemist and SS officer who worked for the Action T4 program of Nazi Germany
- Carolin Widmann (born 1976), German violinist, sister of Jörg
- Erasmus Widmann (1572–1634), South German composer
- Frederick Widmann (1859–1925), German-born American architect and philanthropist
- Horst Widmann (born 1938), Austrian painter
- Johannes Widmann (1460–1498), German mathematician, invented the addition (+) and the subtraction (-) signs
- Jörg Widmann (born 1973), German composer and clarinetist, brother of Carolin
- Rosina Widmann née Binder (1826–1908), German educator and missionary

== See also ==
- Dyckerhoff & Widmann (Dywidag), construction company based in Munich, Germany
- Villa Widmann – Foscari, villa at the shores of the river Brenta between Venice and Padua
- Widman, a Swedish surname
- Weidemann
- Weidmann
- Wideman
- Widemann
- Wiedemann
- Wittmann
