= Wiedeman =

Wiedeman is a surname. Notable people with the surname include:

- Andrew Wiedeman (born 1989), American soccer player
- John Wiedeman, American broadcaster

== See also ==
- Wideman
- Wiedemann
- Weideman
- Weidemann
