= Aargauer Literaturhaus =

Cultural institution in Lenzburg (Switzerland)

- Aargauer Literaturhaus Lenzburg
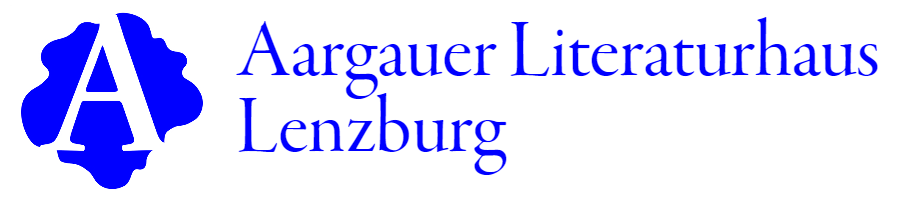

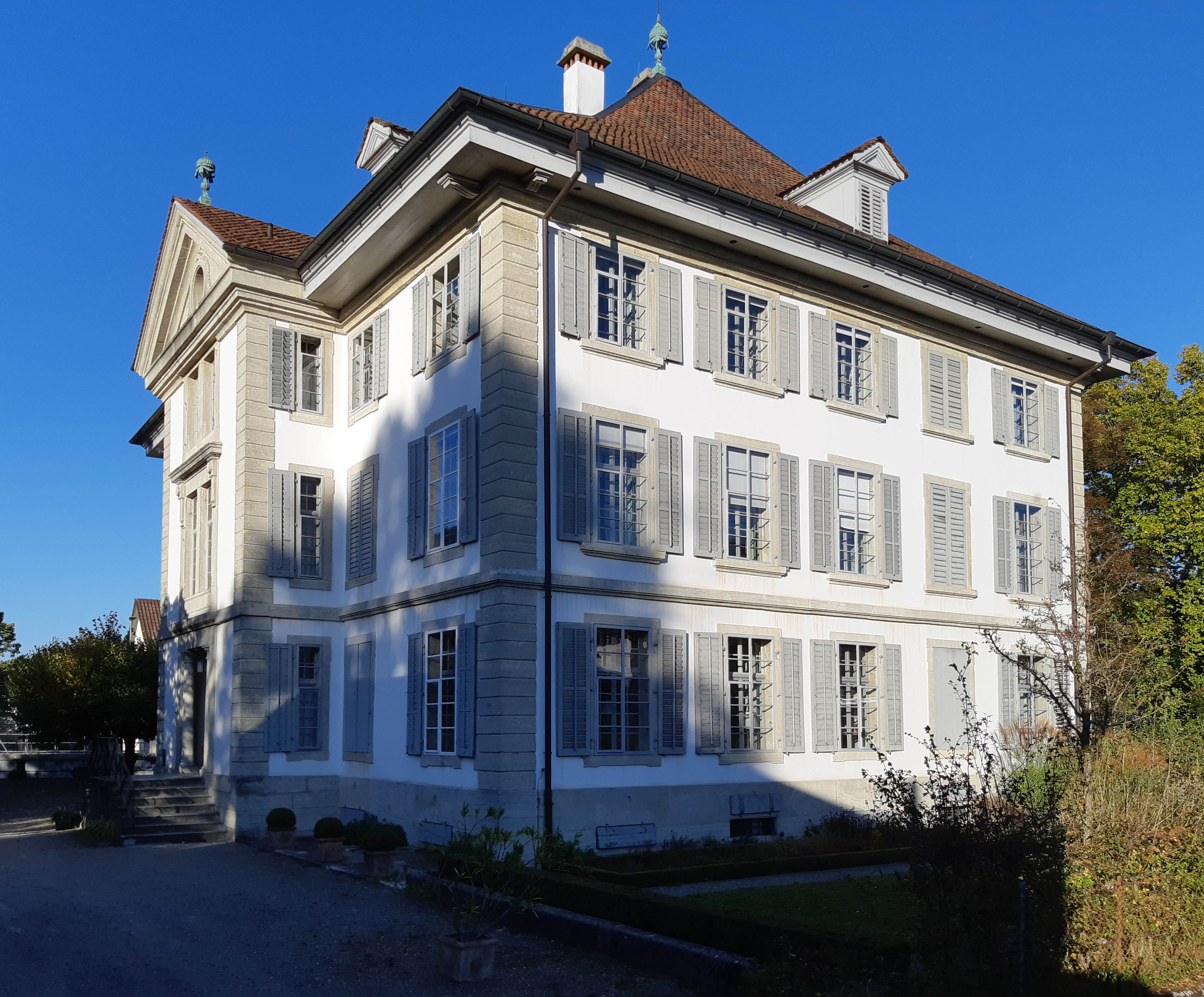
- Formation: 2004; 22 years ago
- Founder: Foundation of Dr. Hans Müller and Gertrude Müller; Canton of Aargau
- Type: Cultural institution
- Purpose: Popularization of literature
- Location: 7 Bleicherain, Müllerhaus, 5600 Lenzburg, Aargau, Switzerland
- Coordinates: 47°23′10″N 8°10′31″E
- Official language: German
- Head: Cédric Weidmann
- Workshops organizer: René Frauchiger
- Website: aargauer-literaturhaus.ch

The Aargauer Literaturhaus (English: Aargau Literature House) is a cultural institution in Lenzburg (Canton of Aargau, Switzerland) dedicated to the popularization of literature and literary practices. It carries out author talks, reading conferences, and literary workshops for all ages on a regular basis. Established in 2004, it is located in the city's cultural center, the Müllerhaus, an architectural monument of the 18th century and one of the most important cultural assets in Lenzburg.

The House maintains a one-person writer's residence (with the right to stay up to three months) – the Atelier Müllerhaus studio.

== History ==
The Müllerhaus, a three-story early classical mansion at 7 Bleicherain, "the most beautiful house in Aargau" half a kilometer from the Lenzburg Castle hill, was commissioned by the Lenzburg cotton industrialist Gottlieb Hünerwadel and built in 1785 by the Bernese architect Carl Ahasver von Sinner. After the economic decline of the Hünerwadel dynasty at the end of the 19th century, the doctor Adolf Müller-Fischer bought the vacant town house in 1903. He opened his medical practice there and moved with his family to the second floor. Since 1987, the architectural monument is owned by the cultural and charitable Foundation of Dr. Hans Müller (1897–1989) and Gertrude Müller (1901–2001), siblings and heirs of A. Müller-Fischer (German: Stiftung Dr. Hans Müller und Gertrud Müller). In 2004, as part of a civic initiative supported by the Müller Foundation and the Aargau Board of Trustees (German: Aargauer Kuratorium), the institution's main financial partner since 2010, the Müllerhaus became the official address of the cantonal Literature House.

== Activities ==
The House, which positions itself as "a place for the Word, a meeting place for readers and writers, a hospitable home for literature and people devoted to it," (German: Ein Ort fürs Wort, ein Treffpunkt für Lesende und Schreibende, ein gastliches Haus für Literatur und Menschen, die ihr zugewandt sind) carries out performances of famous authors, readers' conferences, courses on writing and motivated critical reading for children, youth, and adults, as well as other literary events of national and international level, on a regular basis.

Three times a year, a noted foreign writer or translator has the opportunity to use a three-month residence at the House, the Atelier Müllerhaus studio, by personal invitation of the House's management. Among the guests of the studio were Felicitas Hoppe (Germany), Marcel Beyer (Germany), Cécile Wajsbrot (France), Olga Grjasnowa (Germany), Marion Poschmann (Germany), Kurt Drawert (Germany), Julya Rabinowich (Austria), Silke Scheuermann (Germany), Stephan Thome (Germany), Jaroslav Rudiš (Czech Republic), Ursula Krechel (Germany), Thomas Hettche (Germany), Mirko Bonné (Germany), Lutz Seiler (Germany), Michael Stavarič (Austria), Barbara Honigmann (Germany), Michael Kleeberg (Germany), Jan Koneffke (Germany), María Cecilia Barbetta (Germany) and other authors.

According to the House's program manifesto, its first priority is "not to mythologize literary practice as democratic, but to make it vivid and communicative. Today, the house of literature is at the same time a substitute for that of series, films, video games, and podcasts; in it, the cultural technique of storytelling, whose tropes and memes have long since transcended all media boundaries, is archived, learned, shared, and celebrated. The Literature House is thus a house with open doors: a workshop that does not merely mediate literature, but co-creates and incubates it within itself".

== Directors ==
- Andreas Neeser (2004–2011)
- Svenja Herrmann, Martina Kuoni (2010, temporarily)
- Sibylle Birrer (2012–2013)
- Bettina Spoerri (2013–2022)
- Cédric Weidmann (2022–present)

== See also ==
- Aargauer Kunsthaus
