= Wiedermann =

Wiedermann is a German surname. It is an alternate spelling of Wiedemann, and a variant of Widmann. Notable people with the surname include:

- Bedřich Antonín Wiedermann (1883–1951), Czech organist, composer, and teacher
- Herbert Wiedermann (born 1927), Austrian sprint canoer
- Helga Hellebrand-Wiedermann (1930–2013), Austrian sprint canoer

== See also ==
- Wiedemann
