= Theo Glinz =

Swiss painter

- Born: 6 September 1890; Lenzburg, Switzerland
- Died: 10 May 1962 (aged 71); Horn, Switzerland

Theo Glinz (1890–1962) was a Swiss painter.

Glinz was born on 6 September 1890 in Lenzburg, Switzerland. His father was an art teacher in the local school district. He moved to eastern Switzerland in 1915; in 1927 he relocated to Horn.

== Selected works ==
- Südliche Landschaft (Southern landscape), oil painting
- Die Kirche von Carona (The church of Carona), oil on wood
- Grosse Gartenlandschaft (Large garden landscape), oil on plywood
- Waldlichtung (Forest clearing), pen and pencil on paper
- Altenrhein, oil on plywood
- Bad Horn, oil on canvas, 1933
- Landschaft bei der Grünau, Horn (Landscape at Grünau, Horn), pen and ink drawing on paper, 1941
- Er spricht zu seinem Volk (He speaks to his people), oil on plywood, 1942
- Landarbeiter bei der Ruhepause (Agricultural workers at rest), oil on panel, 1947

== Literature ==
- Literature by and about Theo Glinz in the catalog of the German National Library (in German)
