= Wideman =

Wideman is the Americanized form of German surname Weidmann meaning ‘huntsman’

Wideman may refer to:

- Chris Wideman (born 1990), American ice hockey player
- Dennis Earl Wideman, Canadian professional ice hockey defenceman.
- Jamila Wideman (born 1975), American female left-handed point guard basketball player, lawyer and activist.
- Johannes Widmann, German mathematician who invented the addition (+) and the subtraction (-) signs.
- John Edgar Wideman, American writer, professor at Brown University
- Lydia Wideman, former cross-country skier from Finland.
- Malachi Wideman (born 2001), American football player
- Max Wideman, creator of the first edition of the Project Management Body of Knowledge
- Tyler Wideman (born 1995), American basketball player in the Israeli National League
- Wideman, Arkansas

== See also ==
- Weidman
