= Müllerhaus Lenzburg =

Müllerhaus
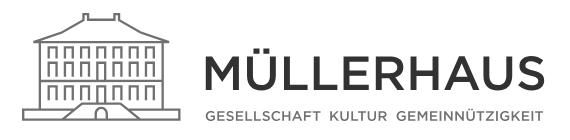

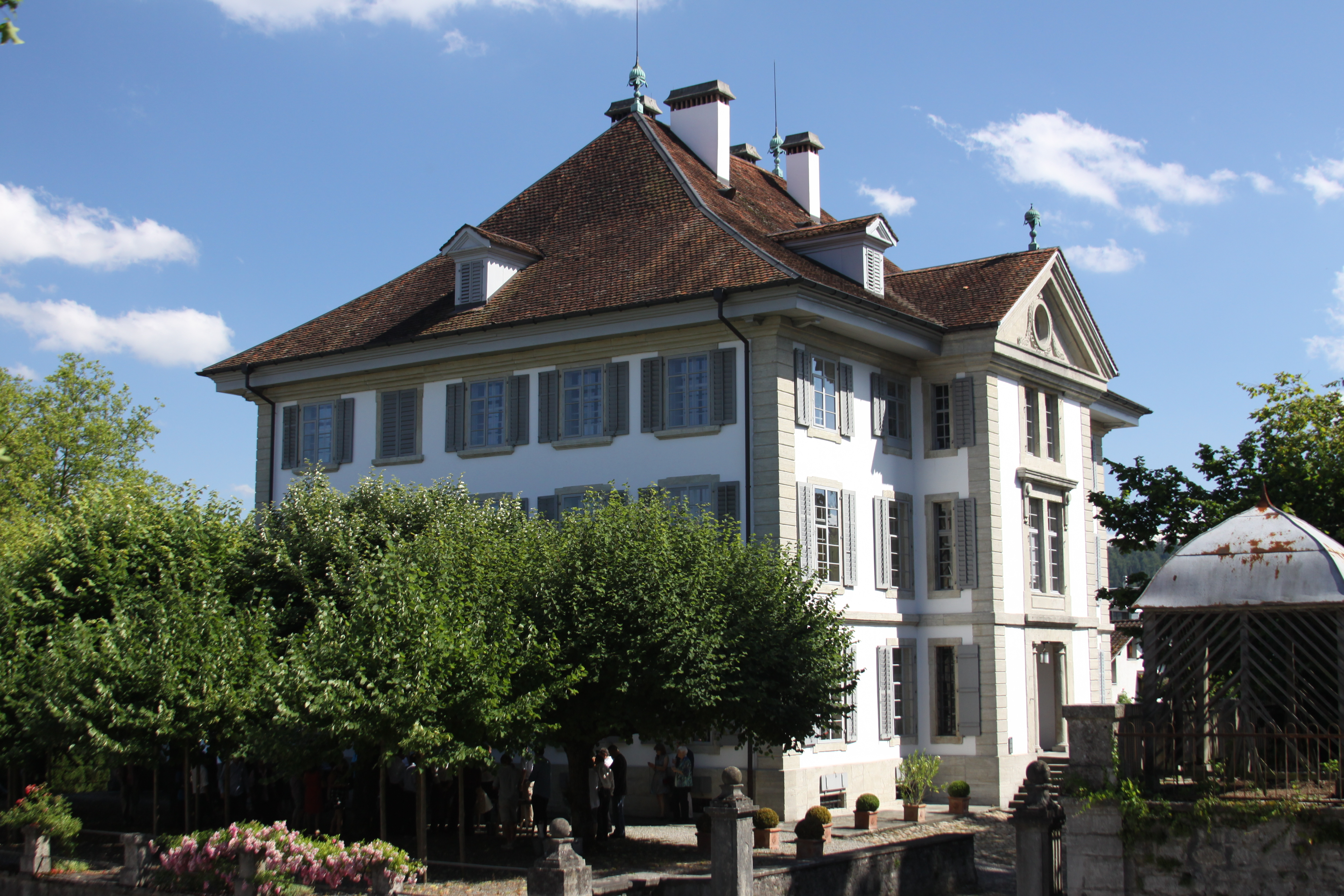
- Interactive map of the Müllerhaus area

General information
- Architectural style: Classicism
- Location: 7 Bleicherain, 5600 Lenzburg, Aargau, Switzerland
- Coordinates: 47°23′10″N 8°10′31″E
- Completed: 1785
- Client: Gottlieb Hünerwadel
- Owner: Stiftung Dr. Hans Müller und Gertrud Müller

Design and construction
- Architect: Carl Ahasver von Sinner

Website
- muellerhaus.ch

The Müllerhaus is a listed townhouse in Lenzburg, Aargau, Switzerland. The early classicist building, which was commissioned by the Lenzburg cotton industrialist Gottlieb Hünerwadel and built in 1785 by the Bernese architect Carl Ahasver von Sinner, is considered one of the most important cultural assets in Lenzburg.

== History ==
The townhouse was built in 1785 during the cotton boom era and served as a residence and commercial building at the same time. The basement served as a warehouse, the first floor for sales, while the two upper floors were used as manorial apartments.

After the economic decline of the Hünerwadel dynasty at the end of the 19th century, the doctor Adolf Müller-Fischer bought the vacant town house in 1903. He opened his medical practice there and moved with his family to the second floor. Since 1987, the architectural monument is owned by the cultural and charitable Foundation of Dr. Hans Müller (1897–1989) and Gertrude Müller (1901–2001), siblings and heirs of A. Müller-Fischer (German: Stiftung Dr. Hans Müller und Gertrud Müller). It is the home of the Aargauer Literaturhaus, the art painter Fritz Huser, Peter Mieg Foundation, Pro Argovia, Forum Helveticum and various non-profit organizations. Cultural events, weddings, readings, concerts, educational courses and festivities are held there.

== See also ==
- List of cultural assets in Lenzburg
