= Carl Ahasver von Sinner =

Swiss architect (1754–1821)

Carl Ahasver von Sinner (February 2, 1754 – April 25, 1821) was a Bernese architect of the Louis XVI period.

== Biography ==
Born in Sumiswald as the son of governor (Landvogt) Johann Bernhard von Sinner, he married Maria Susanna Zeerleder in 1780. He was a member of the Grand Council of Bern, in 1795 and head magistrate (Oberamtmann) of Schwarzenburg from 1803 to 1805.

As an architect, he is noted for the palace of Lohn, now the country estate of the Swiss Federal Council; the Kleehof in Kirchberg and the estate of Hofwil in Münchenbuchsee.

== Buildings ==
- Landsitz Lohn, Kehrsatz, 1782–1783
- Tschiffeligut (Kleehof), Kirchberg, Bern, reconstruction 1783
- Clergy house, Ammerswil, 1783
- Amtshaus (official residence), Aarau, 1784–1787
- Hofwil, Münchenbuchsee, 1784–1786
- Schloss Rued, Schlossrued 1792–1796
- Ortbühl, Steffisburg, 1794
- Gasthof Ochsen, Schöftland, 1798
- Urechhaus (a three-story classicist house), Othmarsingen
- Müllerhaus Lenzburg, 1780
