= René Frauchiger =

Swiss writer, editor and teacher

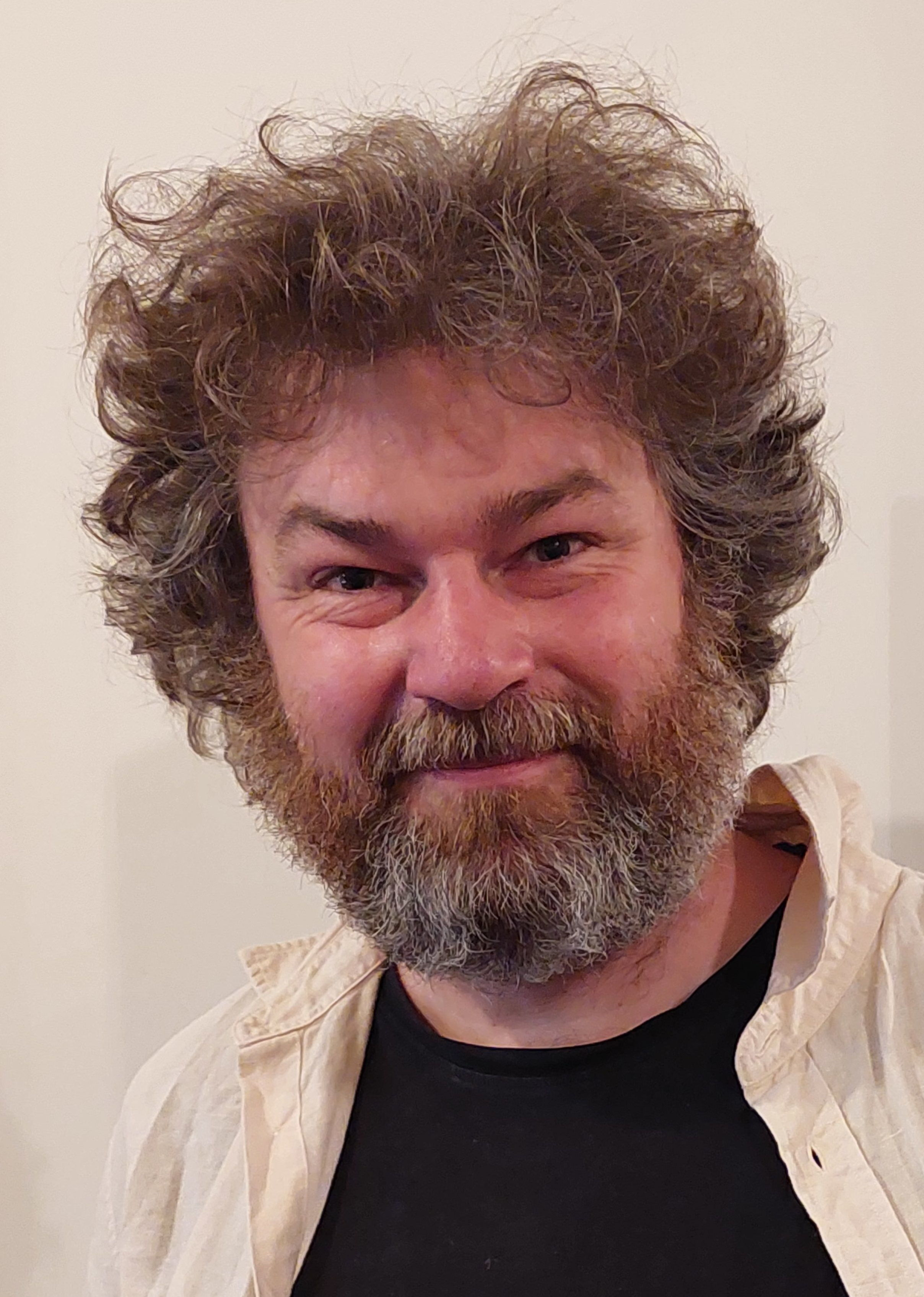
- Born: 28 July 1981 (age 45); Langenthal, Aarwangen District, Canton of Bern, Switzerland
- Citizenship: Switzerland
- Education: University of Basel
- Occupations: Writer, editor and teacher
- Writing career
- Language: German
- Genres: Short prose, speculative fiction
- Website: renefrauchiger.ch

René Frauchiger (born 28 July 1981 in Langenthal) is a Swiss writer, editor and teacher.

== Biography ==
René Frauchiger grew up in Madiswil. After an apprenticeship as a commercial clerk, he worked as a freelancer for the Berner Zeitung before attending the University of Basel where he studied German language and philosophy. In 2011, he founded the "narrativist literary magazine" Das Narr (The Fool) together with Lukas Gloor and Daniel Kissling. As an author and editor, he has published a number books, including a literary cookbook, travel guides to Basel and Bern, and several novels. In 2017, Frauchiger was awarded a grant from the Fachausschuss für Literatur Basel. Since 2022, he has led the reading/writing workshops at the Aargauer Literaturhaus Lenzburg.

He debuted in 2019 with the new weird novel Giants Are Just Big People (German: Riesen sind nur grosse Menschen) published by homunculus verlag, followed in 2022 by the novel Ants Find It Difficult to Speak (German: Ameisen fällt das Sprechen schwer) published by Knapp Verlag.

René Frauchiger is a member of the Associations of Authors of Switzerland and the Swiss Speculative Fiction Authors (German: Schweizer Phantastikautoren). He lives in Basel.

== Bibliography ==
- Frauchiger, René (2017). Die Nacht der Handymonster: [Heftroman]. Narr-Groschen. Horror. Olten: Der Narrativistische Verein. ISBN 978-3-952488-12-6.
- Frauchiger, René (2019). Riesen sind nur grosse Menschen: Roman. Erlangen: homunculus verlag. ISBN 978-3-946120-29-2.
- Frauchiger, René (2022). Ameisen fällt das Sprechen schwer: Roman. [Olten]: Knapp Verlag. ISBN 978-3-906311-99-9.
