= Wiedmann =

Wiedmann is a German surname. Notable people with the surname include:

- Frederik Wiedmann (born 1981), German composer
- Siegfried K. Wiedmann (born 1938), German electrical engineer
- Willy Wiedmann (1929–2013), German artist, writer and art dealer

== See also ==
- Stump Weidman (1861–1905), American baseball player
- Wiedemann
