= Lenzburg =

- Municipality
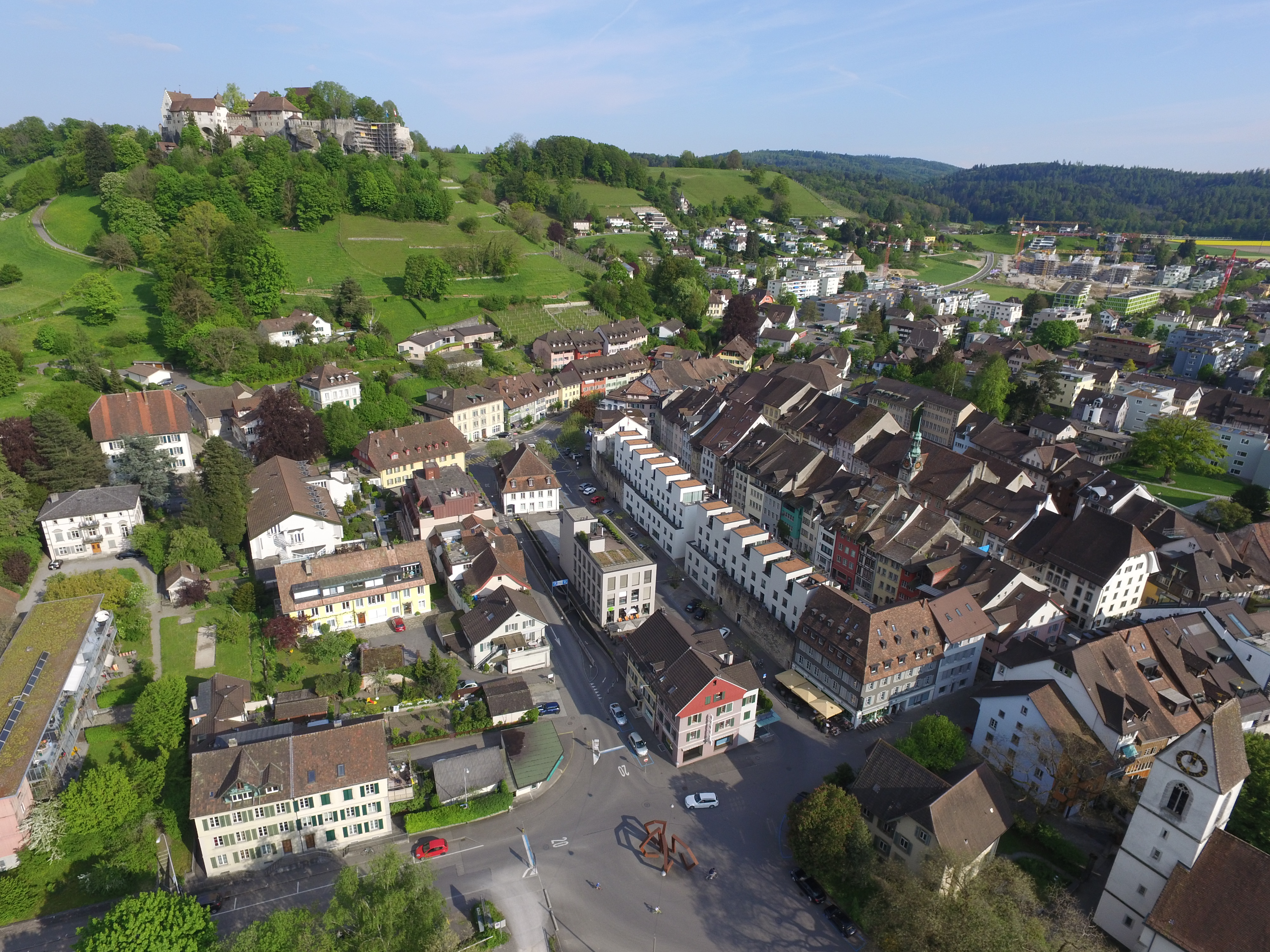

- Flag Coat of arms
- Location of Lenzburg
- Location within Switzerland Location within Canton of Aargau
- Coordinates: 47°23′N 8°11′E
- Country: Switzerland
- Canton: Aargau
- District: Lenzburg

Government
  - Mayor: Daniel Mosimann SPS/PSS

Area
  - Total: 11.33 km^{2} (4.37 sq mi)
- Elevation: 405 m (1,329 ft)

Population (2006)
  - Total: 7,731
  - Density: 682.3/km^{2} (1,767/sq mi)
- Time zone: UTC+01:00 (CET)
  - Summer (DST): UTC+02:00 (CEST)
- Postal code: 5600
- SFOS number: 4201
- ISO 3166 code: CH-AG
- Surrounded by: Ammerswil, Egliswil, Hendschiken, Möriken-Wildegg, Niederlenz, Othmarsingen, Rupperswil, Seon, Staufen
- Website: www.lenzburg.ch

Lenzburg is a town in the central region of the Swiss canton of Aargau and is the capital of the Lenzburg District. The town, founded in the Middle Ages, lies in the Seetal valley, about 3 kilometres south of the Aare river. Lenzburg and the neighbouring municipalities of Niederlenz and Staufen have grown together in an agglomeration.

== History ==
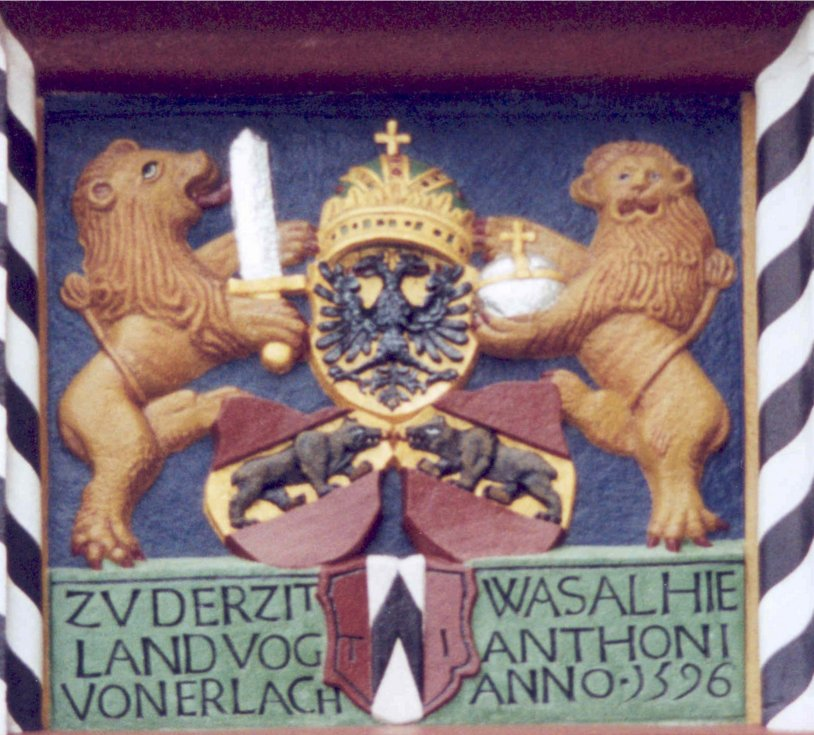
Coat of Arms from Lenzburg castle, showing some of the history of the castle. At the bottom, the coat of arms of the von Erlach family, above that the flag of the canton of Bern, all topped by the Reichsadler of the Holy Roman Empire.

A Neolithic grave field of the Cortaillod culture has been discovered on the Goffersberg (close to the Lenzburg Castle) dating from 4300 - 3500 BCE. A Roman theater was uncovered when a motorway was built in 1964. It was part of a small settlement with 500 inhabitants that existed for approximately 200 years. The settlement was abandoned in the 3rd century. In the 5th and 6th centuries, an Alamanni settlement existed. Lenzburg is first mentioned in 924 as de Lencis.

In 1036, Lenzburg Castle was used for the first time as seat for the Count of Lenzburg, then an important lord. The house however died out in 1173, and the castle was then transferred to emperor Frederick Barbarossa. In the following period, it was mainly used by the Kyburger house. The Habsburgs took over the castle in 1273. City rights were granted in 1306.

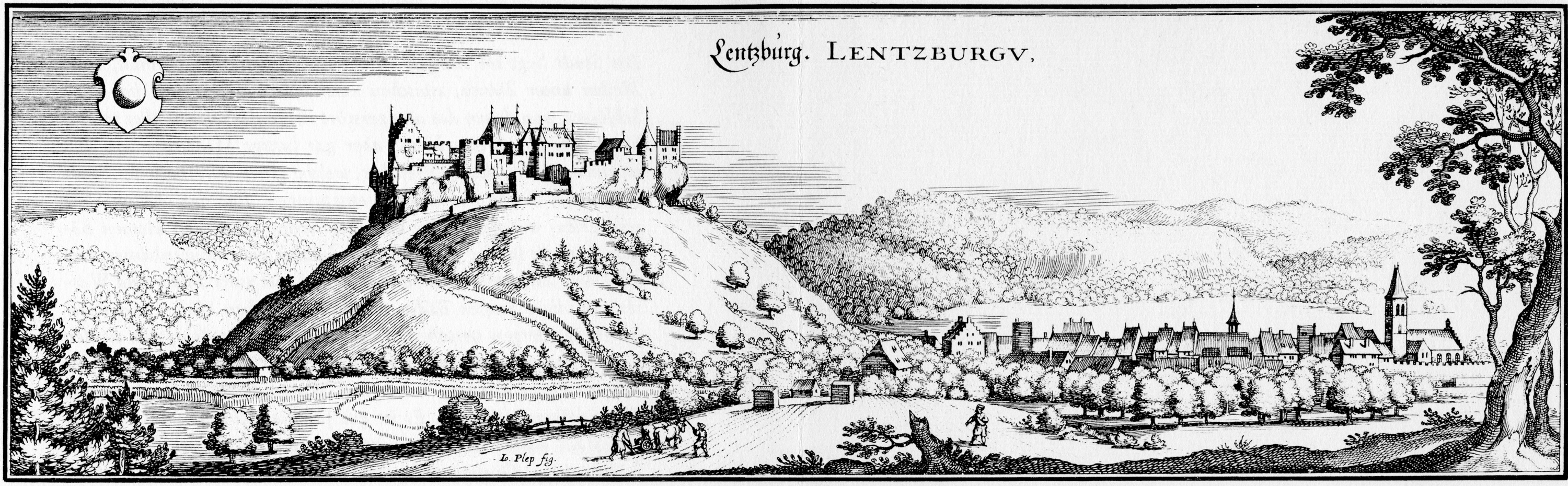
Castle Lenzburg in 1642

Lenzburg was conquered by Bern in 1415, along with the western part of current Aargau, though Bern did not take away its city rights. In 1433, the city of Bern bought the castle and used it to govern the region from 1444 to 1798. A major fire devastated the town in 1491, sparing only fifteen houses. The Reformation was carried out simultaneously with the rest of the region in 1528, and the economy started to transform slowly from an agrarian to a more industrial one in the 16th century. In the 18th century Lenzburg developed into a centre for cotton trade and processing. An Indienne textile factory was founded in 1732.

In 1798, the Helvetian Republic was proclaimed and the lords from Bern were ousted. The canton of Aargau was founded and Lenzburg became a district capital in 1803.

In 1830, a series of meetings were held in Lenzberg to discuss changing the cantonal constitution. When peaceful negotiation with the cantonal authorities in Aarau failed to produce results, Johann Heinrich Fischer from Merenschwand called for a rebel militia from the Freiämter to force the government to change, in what was known as the Freiämtersturm. On 6 December 1830, his rebel troops marched toward Lenzberg on their way to Aarau. At Lenzberg, about 100 government soldiers formed to resist the militia, and brought their guns in position. The Freiämter militia ran toward the militia with wild battle cries, and the government soldiers broke and ran without firing a shot. By 6pm the militia entered Aarau and the commander of government troops surrendered without any resistance.

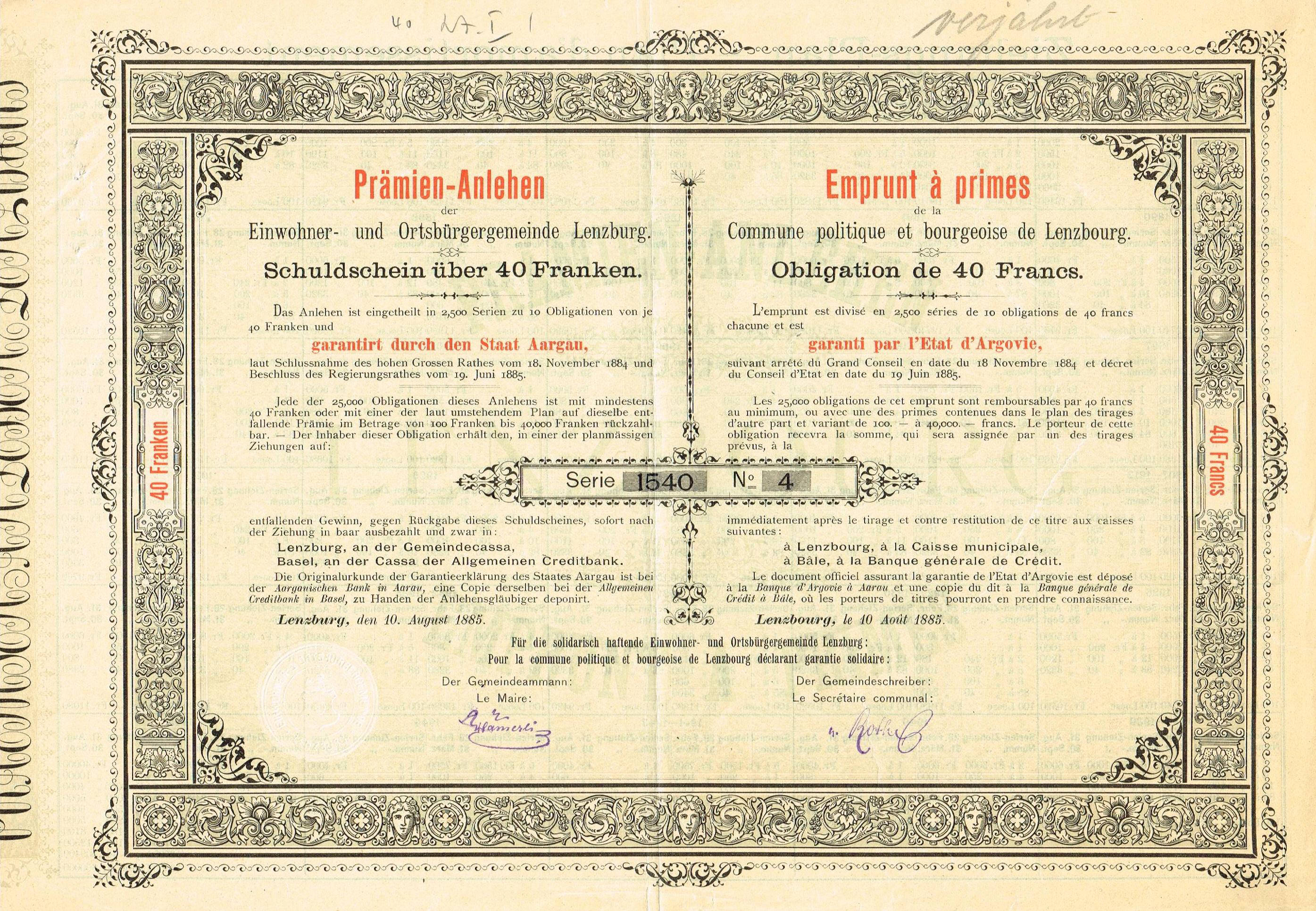
Debenture of Lenzburg, issued 10. August 1885

Lenzburg transformed into the economic centre of the region in the second half of the 19th century. On 23 June 1874, Lenzburg was connected to the Aargauische Südbahn railway. On 6 September 1877 the Schweizerische Nationalbahn opened a line from Wettingen to Zofingen as part of a plan to connect Singen, Germany and Lake Geneva in competition with the established railway companies. The line went bankrupt in 1878 and was taken over by the Schweizerische Nordostbahn. The bankruptcy of the Nationalbahn brought Lenzburg to the brink of economic ruin, as the city itself was heavily involved in financing it. Paying back the city's debt took half a century.

The castle changed hands several times in the 19th and 20th century. In 1860, it was bought by Frank Wedekind, a poet from Germany. In 1893, it was purchased by Americans and renovated. Finally, in 1956, it was bought by the canton and since been used to house a museum.

== Geography ==
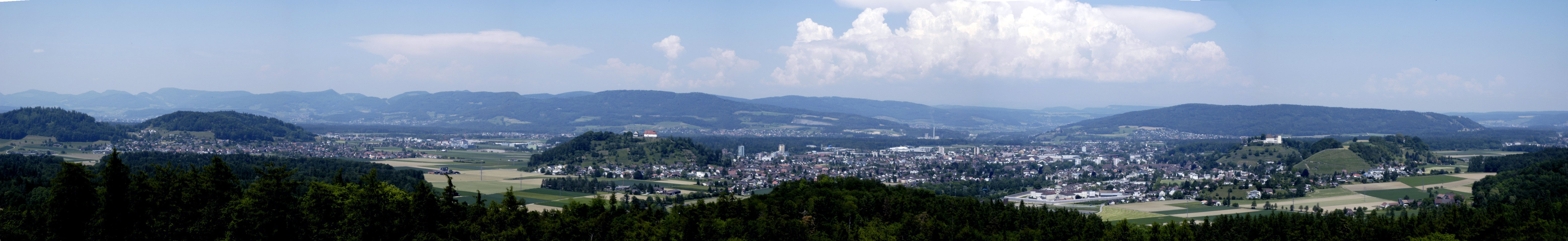
Panorama of the region around Lenzburg, from the castle hill

Aerial view (1951)

Lenzburg lies on the small river Aabach, at the northern edge of the Seetal. It lies 30 km west of Zürich. Lenzburg has an area, as of 2009, of 11.33 square kilometers (4.37 sq mi). Of this area, 2.47 km^{2} (0.95 sq mi) or 21.8% is used for agricultural purposes, while 5.62 km^{2} (2.17 sq mi) or 49.6% is forested. Of the rest of the land, 3.2 km^{2} (1.2 sq mi) or 28.2% is settled (buildings or roads), 0.06 km^{2} (15 acres) or 0.5% is either rivers or lakes.

Of the built up area, industrial buildings made up 4.9% of the total area while housing and buildings made up 12.3% and transportation infrastructure made up 7.4%. Power and water infrastructure as well as other special developed areas made up 1.9% of the area while parks, green belts and sports fields made up 1.7%. Out of the forested land, all of the forested land area is covered with heavy forests. Of the agricultural land, 15.2% is used for growing crops and 6.0% is pastures. All the water in the municipality is in rivers and streams.

== Coat of arms ==
The blazon of the municipal coat of arms is Argent a Hurt.

== Demographics ==
Lenzburg has a population (as of December 2020) of 11,024. As of June 2009, 27.6% of the population are foreign nationals. Over the last 10 years (1997–2007) the population has changed at a rate of 6.3%. Most of the population (as of 2000) speaks German (78.0%), with Italian being second most common ( 8.7%) and Albanian being third ( 2.1%).

The age distribution, as of 2008, in Lenzburg is; 731 children or 9.1% of the population are between 0 and 9 years old and 845 teenagers or 10.5% are between 10 and 19. Of the adult population, 1,235 people or 15.4% of the population are between 20 and 29 years old. 1,131 people or 14.1% are between 30 and 39, 1,245 people or 15.5% are between 40 and 49, and 1,016 people or 12.7% are between 50 and 59. The senior population distribution is 777 people or 9.7% of the population are between 60 and 69 years old, 611 people or 7.6% are between 70 and 79, there are 345 people or 4.3% who are between 80 and 89, and there are 78 people or 1.0% who are 90 and older.

As of 2000 the average number of residents per living room was 0.56 which is about equal to the cantonal average of 0.57 per room. In this case, a room is defined as space of a housing unit of at least 4 m^{2} (43 sq ft) as normal bedrooms, dining rooms, living rooms, kitchens and habitable cellars and attics. About 36.2% of the total households were owner occupied, or in other words did not pay rent (though they may have a mortgage or a rent-to-own agreement). As of 2000, there were 495 homes with 1 or 2 persons in the household, 1,788 homes with 3 or 4 persons in the household, and 921 homes with 5 or more persons in the household. As of 2000, there were 3,251 private households (homes and apartments) in the municipality, and an average of 2.2 persons per household. In 2008 there were 935 single family homes (or 23.4% of the total) out of a total of 4,003 homes and apartments. There were a total of 19 empty apartments for a 0.5% vacancy rate. As of 2007, the construction rate of new housing units was 5.7 new units per 1000 residents.

In the 2007 federal election the most popular party was the SVP which received 27.5% of the vote. The next three most popular parties were the SP (22.7%), the FDP (17.5%) and the CVP (9%).

The historical population is given in the following table:

Historical population
Year	Pop.	±%
1850	1,957	—
1900	2,588	+32.2%
1950	4,949	+91.2%
2000	7,568	+52.9%

== Heritage sites of national significance ==
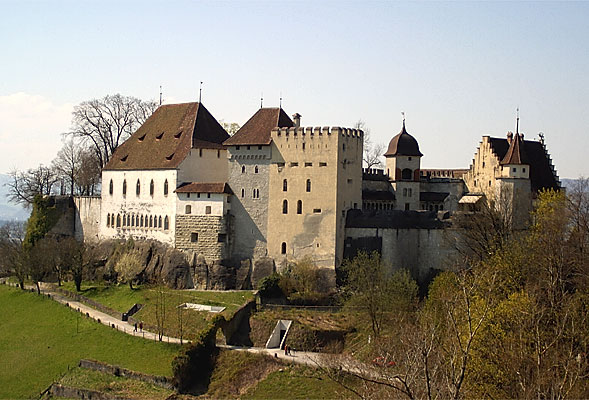
Castle Lenzburg

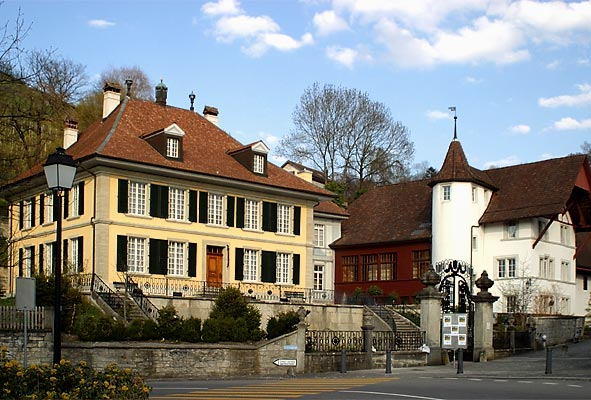
"Neue Burghalde" (1794, left) and "Alte Burghalde" (1628, right)

There are nine sites in Lenzburg that are listed as Swiss heritage sites of national significance. Above the city is the Burghalde at Schlossgasse 21 and Lenzburg castle (which is over a prehistoric settlement and contains the Cantonal Museum). Two other ancient sites, Goffersberg (a neolithic graveyard) and Lindfeld (a Roman Vicus, theatre and burial ground), are included in the list. The other sites in the town include; Müllerhaus at Bleicherain 7, the Town Council Hall (German: Rathaus) at Rathausgasse 16, Sonnenberg at Schlossgasse 50, the prison at Ziegeleiweg 13 and Villa Malaga at Schützenmattstrasse 7.

The undisputed landmark of the city is the Lenzburg Castle, built in the 11th century and since enlarged on several occasions. Lenzburg ranks among the oldest and most important high-castles in Switzerland. The castle is located on a hill and towers about 100 meters above the city level. The old part of the town at the foot of the hill is U-shaped and in very good condition, consisting of a main road with two parallel alleys and another lane. Only parts of the city wall have been preserved and are now under monument protection.

Some notable buildings in and around the old town include:

- Town church, built 1667
- City hall at Rathausgasse 31
- Old Burghalde, built in 1628, housing a museum of regional history
- New Burghalde, built in 1794, a symmetrical classicist building with an external staircase
- Library
- Roman theatre ruins, from the 1st century A.D.

== Economics ==
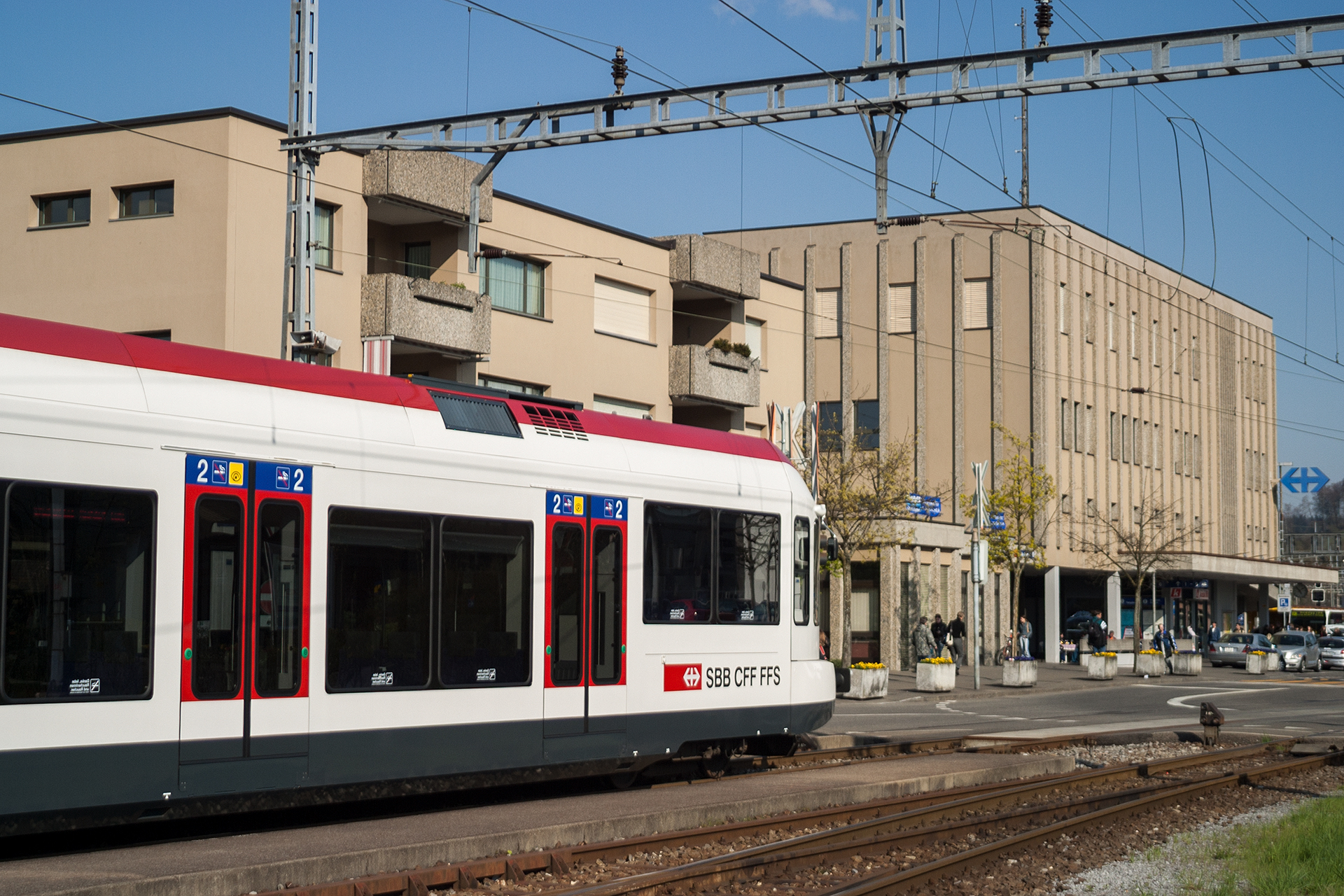
Train station of Lenzburg

Lenzburg is an important economic centre, containing over 600 enterprises, of which about 80% in the service sector. The majority of businesses are in the small and medium enterprise bracket, but a number of international companies are established in Lenzburg, such as the multinational ABB and the meat processing plant Traitafina. Lenzburg has a total workforce of around 6,000.

As of 2007, Lenzburg had an unemployment rate of 2.43%. As of 2005, there were 74 people employed in the primary economic sector and about 16 businesses involved in this sector. 2,160 people are employed in the secondary sector and there are 95 businesses in this sector. 4,014 people are employed in the tertiary sector, with 453 businesses in this sector.

In 2000 there were 3,956 workers who lived in the municipality. Of these, 2,546 or about 64.4% of the residents worked outside Lenzburg while 4,768 people commuted into the municipality for work. There were a total of 6,178 jobs (of at least 6 hours per week) in the municipality. Of the working population, 19.8% used public transportation to get to work, and 39.6% used a private car.

== Transportation ==
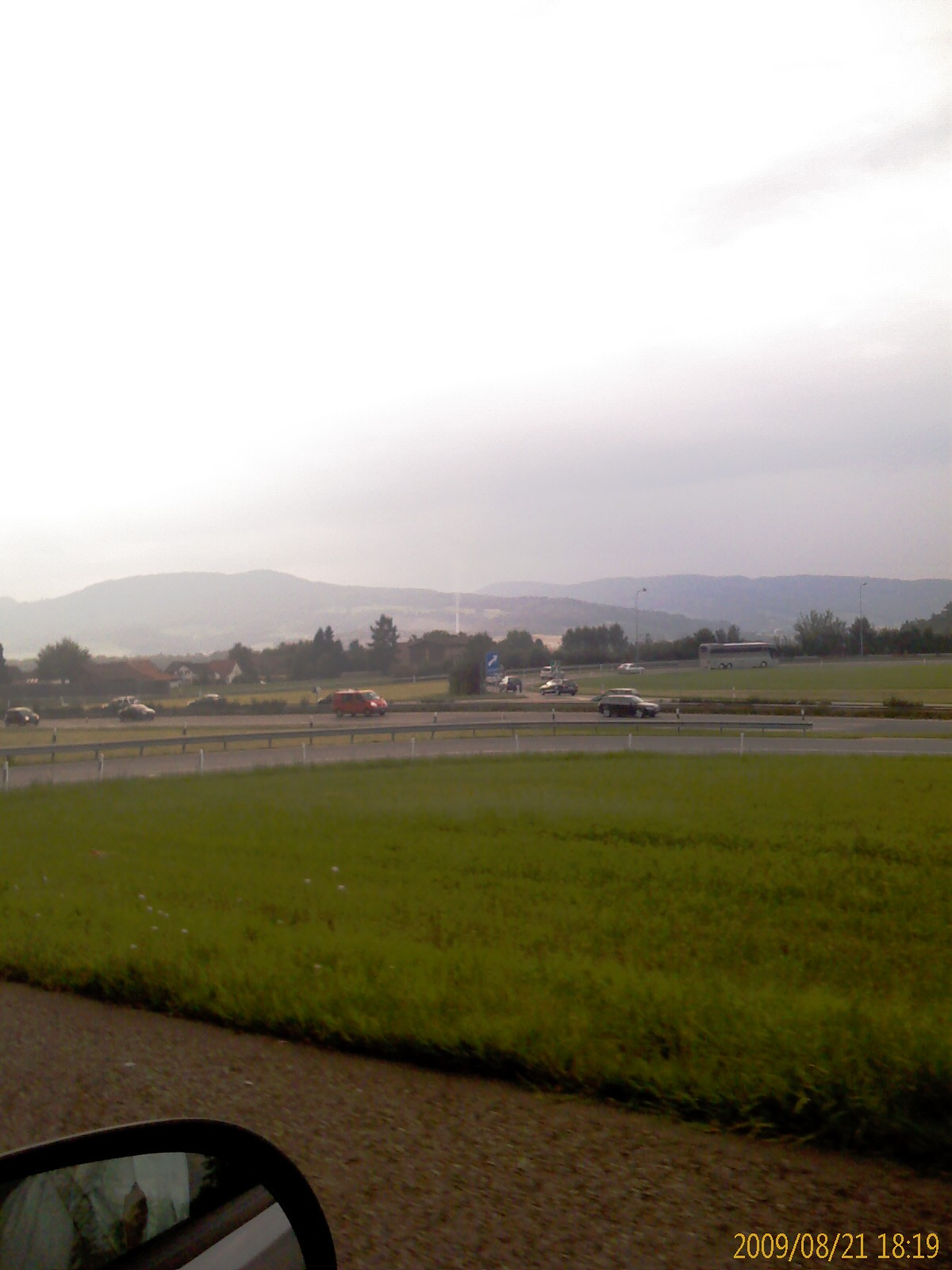
A1 motorway outside Lenzburg

Lenzburg is an important transportation hub, about 30 km west from Zürich, with close access to the A1, Switzerland's most important east-west road connection (Geneva–Bern–Zürich–St. Gallen). A partially underground road named "Kerntangente" was constructed to draw through-traffic away from the city centre.

The Lenzburg railway station is served by fast trains from Zürich to Basel via the Heitersberg Tunnel and Aarau, and by local trains of the Zürich S-Bahn, Aargau S-Bahn and Lucerne S-Bahn. Zurich Airport is within close reach (around 1 hour by train). Lenzburg Stadt had been a station in the center of Lenzburg on a line of Seetalbahn before it was closed in 1984.

The local transit Regionalbus Lenzburg leads to Brunegg, Dintikon, Möriken-Wildegg, Schafisheim and Seengen. The town is also served by an urban bus route.

== Religion ==
From the 2000 census, 2,611 or 34.5% were Roman Catholic, while 3,189 or 42.1% belonged to the Swiss Reformed Church. Of the rest of the population, there were 7 individuals (or about 0.09% of the population) who belonged to the Christian Catholic faith.

== Education ==
In Lenzburg about 66.7% of the population (between age 25-64) have completed either non-mandatory upper secondary education or additional higher education (either university or a Fachhochschule). Of the school age population (in the 2008/2009 school year), there are 491 students attending primary school, there are 187 students attending secondary school, there are 353 students attending tertiary or university level schooling, and there are 12 students who are seeking a job after school in the municipality.

Lenzburg is home to the Aargauer Literaturhaus (Aargau Literature House) and Stadtbibliothek Lenzburg (City Library of Lenzburg). The library has (as of 2008) 31,478 books or other media, and loaned out 93,441 items in the same year. The library was open a total of 244 days with average of 24 hours per week during that year.

== Events ==
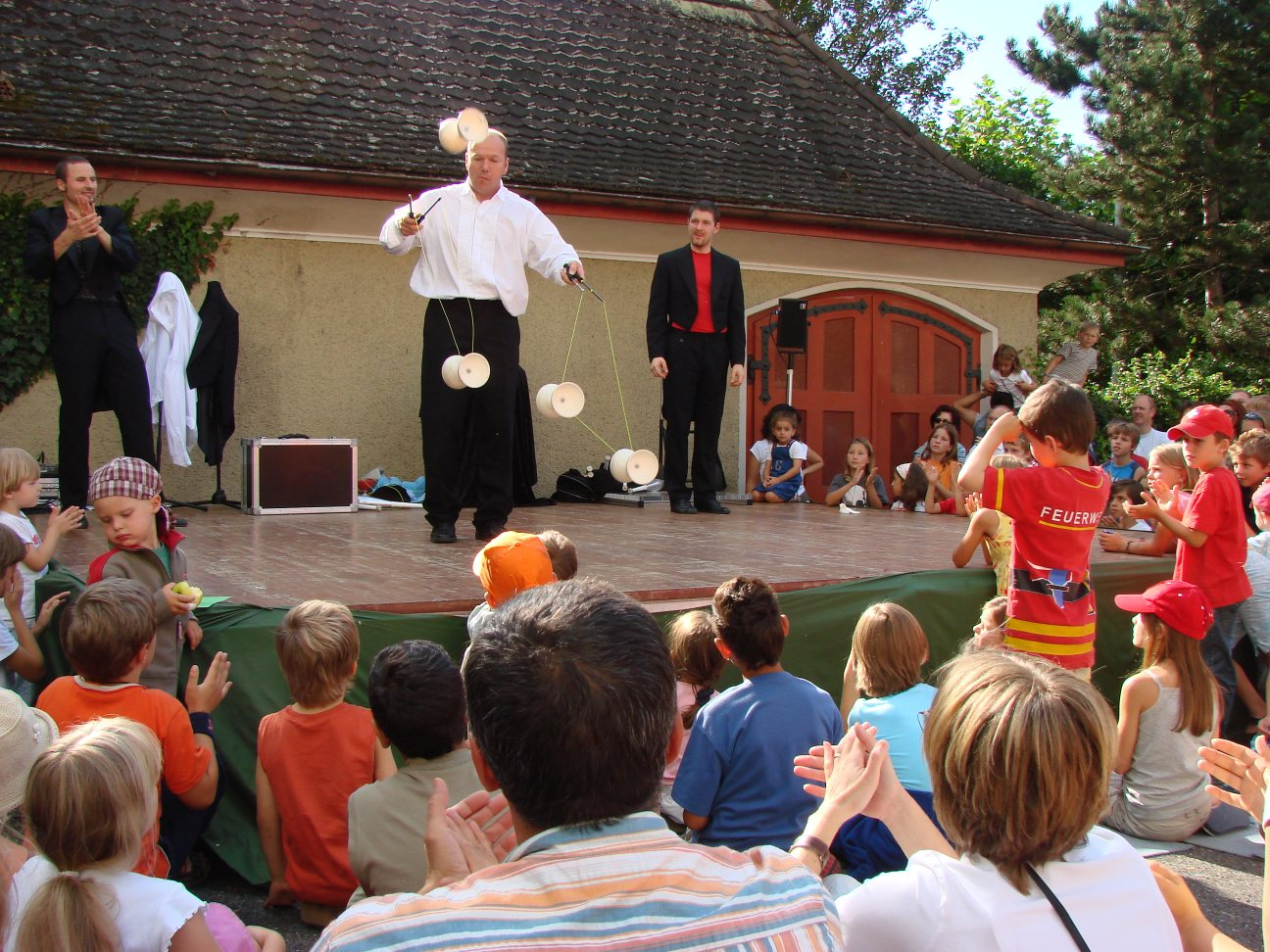
Jugglers at the Gauklerfestival

- For over 400 years the youth celebration is the largest event in Lenzburg, taking place every year on the second Friday of July.
- In August the Gauklerfestival takes place in the streets of the old part of town with international entertainers.

== Notable people ==
- Philipp Albert Stapfer (1766–1840), a Swiss politician and philosopher, minister of the Helvetic Republic
- Fanny Hünerwadel (1826 in Lenzburg – 1854), a Swiss pianist, singer and composer
- Theo Glinz (1890 in Lenzburg – 1962), was a Swiss painter
- Peter Mieg (1906 in Lenzburg – 1990), composer, painter and journalist
- Peter Hirt (1910 in Lenzburg – 1992), racing driver
- Lys Assia (1924–2018), singer, winner of Eurovision Song Contest in 1956.
- Rene Haller (born 1933 in Lenzburg), a Swiss naturalist, trained in Horticulture, Landscaping and Tropical Agronomy
