= Widman =

Widman is a surname. Notable people with the surname include:

- Allan Widman (born 1964), Swedish politician
- Charles Widman (1879–1944), American football player
- John Widman, American luthier
- Kjell-Ove Widman, Swedish mathematician (1940–)
- Peter Widman, Swedish painter (1948–)

== See also ==
- Widmann
