= Kehrsatz Castle =

- Schlössli Kehrsatz (German); Le château de Kehrsatz (French)
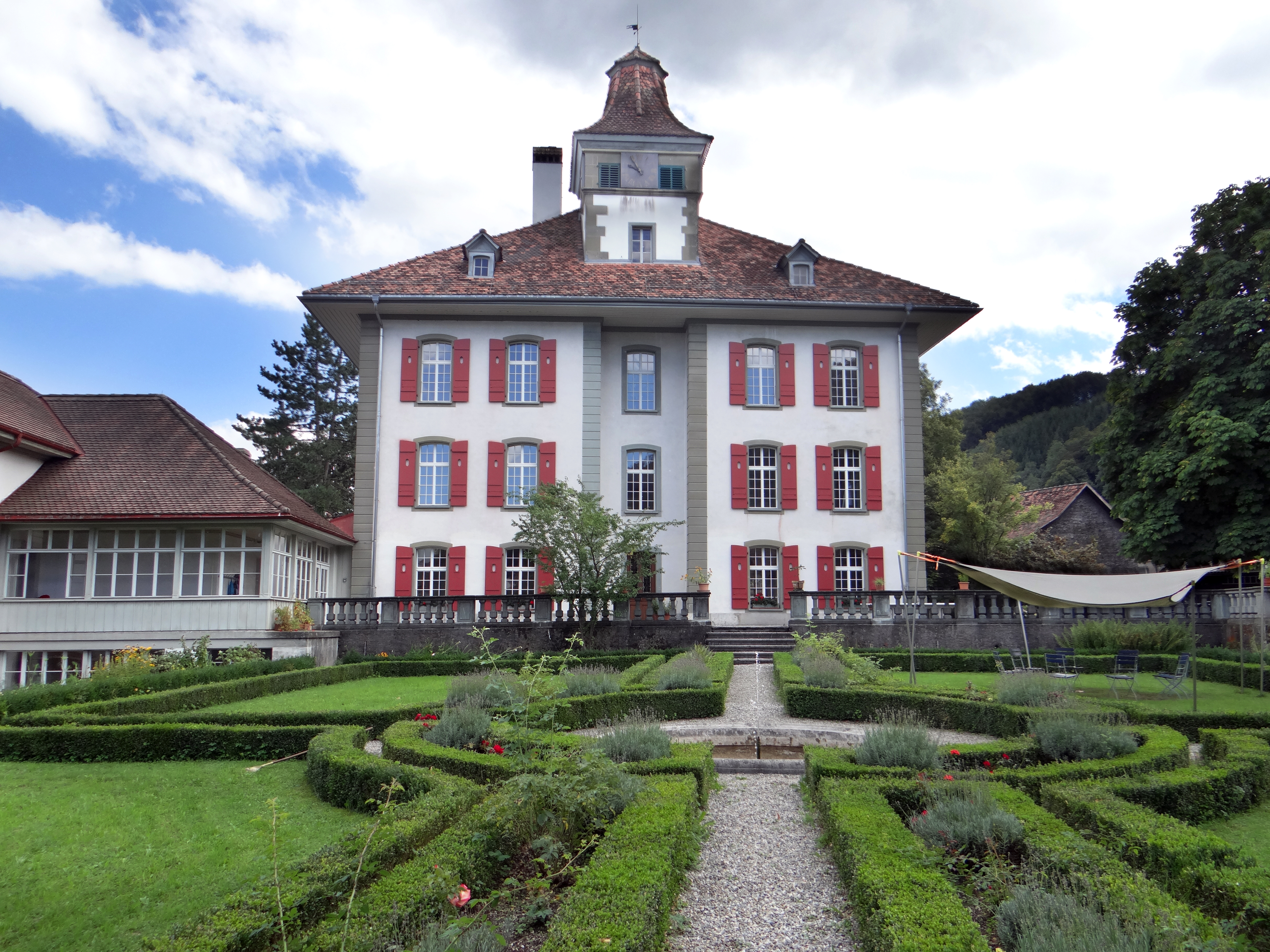
- Kehrsatz Castle

- Location within Switzerland
- 46°54′35″N 7°28′22″E
- Location: Kehrsatz

History
- Built: late 16th century

Kehrsatz Castle (German: Schlössli Kehrsatz) is a castle in the municipality of Kehrsatz of the canton of Bern in Switzerland.

== History ==
The castle was built in the late 16th century. In 1795 Emanuel von Tscharner purchased it from the family of General Karl Hackbrett. The Tscharner family already owned two other estates in Kehrsatz, Lohn Estate and Blumenhof. The 1798 French invasion and creation of the Helvetic Republic reduced the political power of the local patricians, but the Tscharner family retained ownership of all three estates. However, over the following years, the estates were inherited by various members of the family and eventually sold. In 1862 the Tscharners in Kehrsatz Castle died childless and bequeathed it to the Inselspital in Bern.

In 1889 the castle became a girls' boarding school. Between 1950 and 1954, most of the surrounding farm land was leased out, the old barn was demolished and a farm house was built. The building was eventually changed from a girls school into a school for children and parents who had trouble socializing or needed therapy. In 1998, two public school homes, Landorf Köniz and Schlossli Kehrsatz, were combined into a single institution.

== Owners of the castle ==
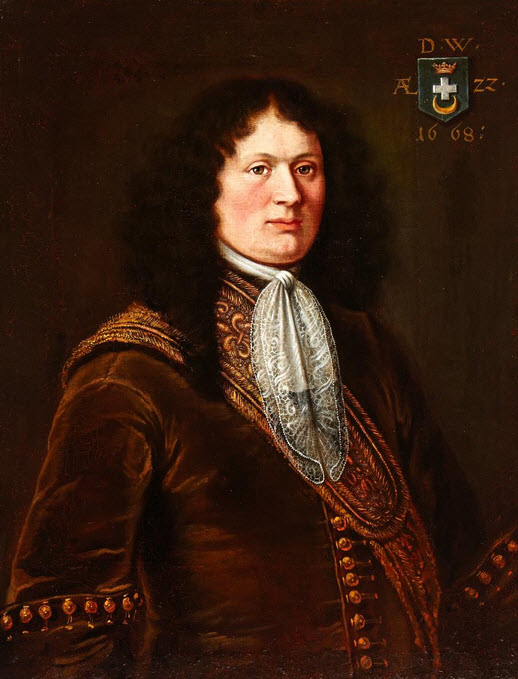
David Wurstemberger
1692—1695

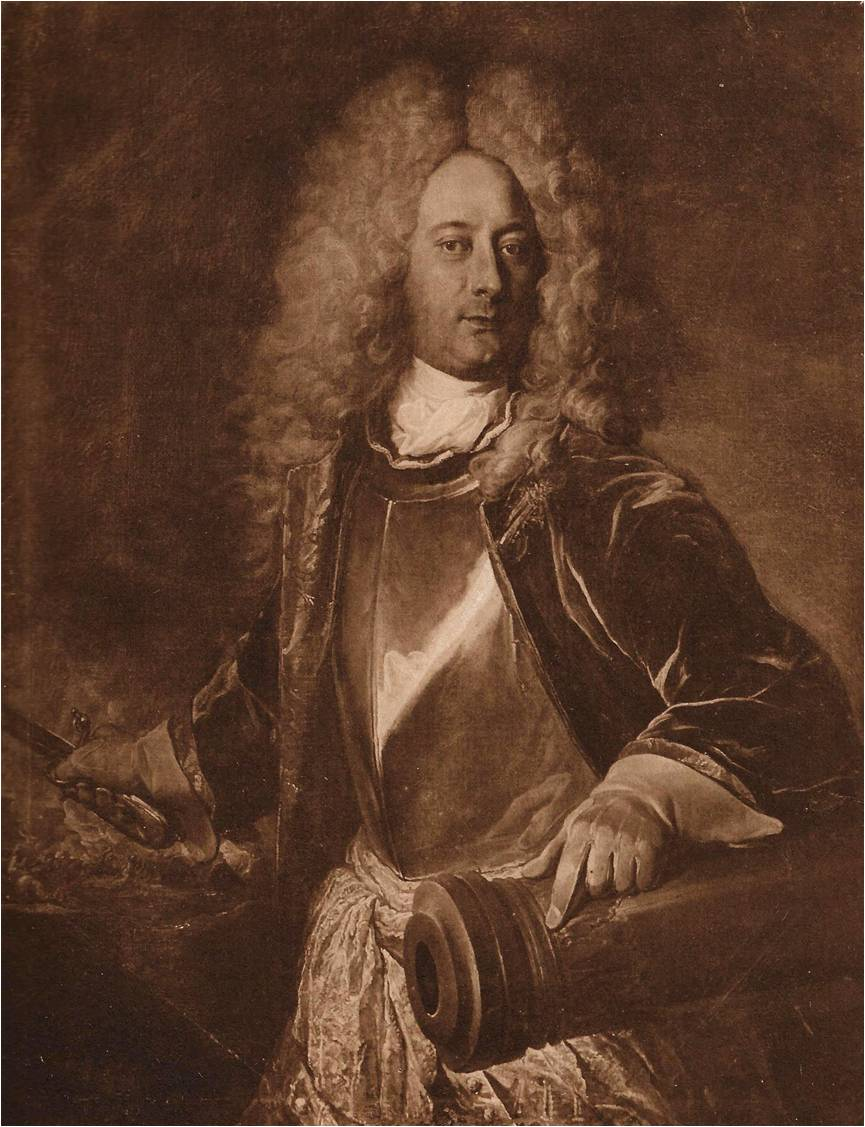
Karl Hackbrett
1720—1737

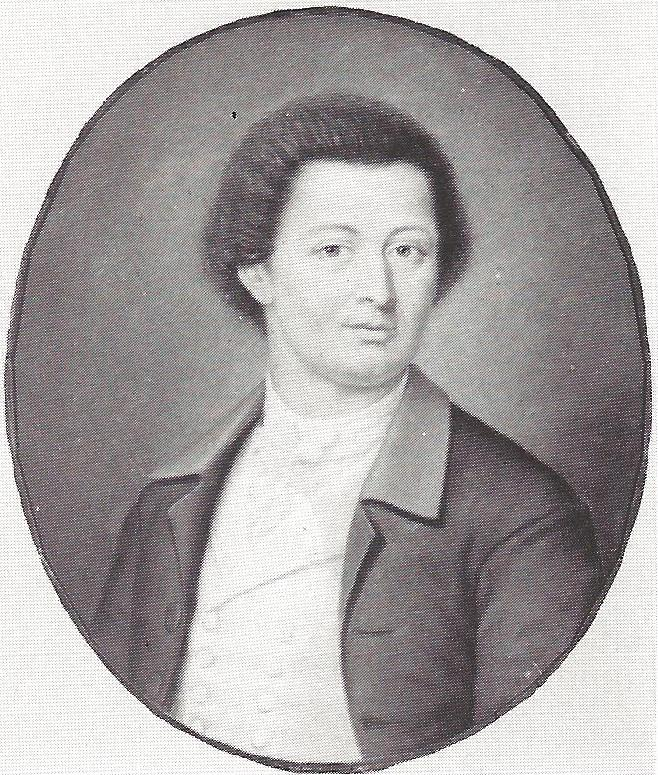
Beat Emanuel Tscharner
1797—1825

== See also ==
- List of castles in Switzerland
