= Wacker Neuson =

Construction equipment manufacturer

Wacker Neuson SE

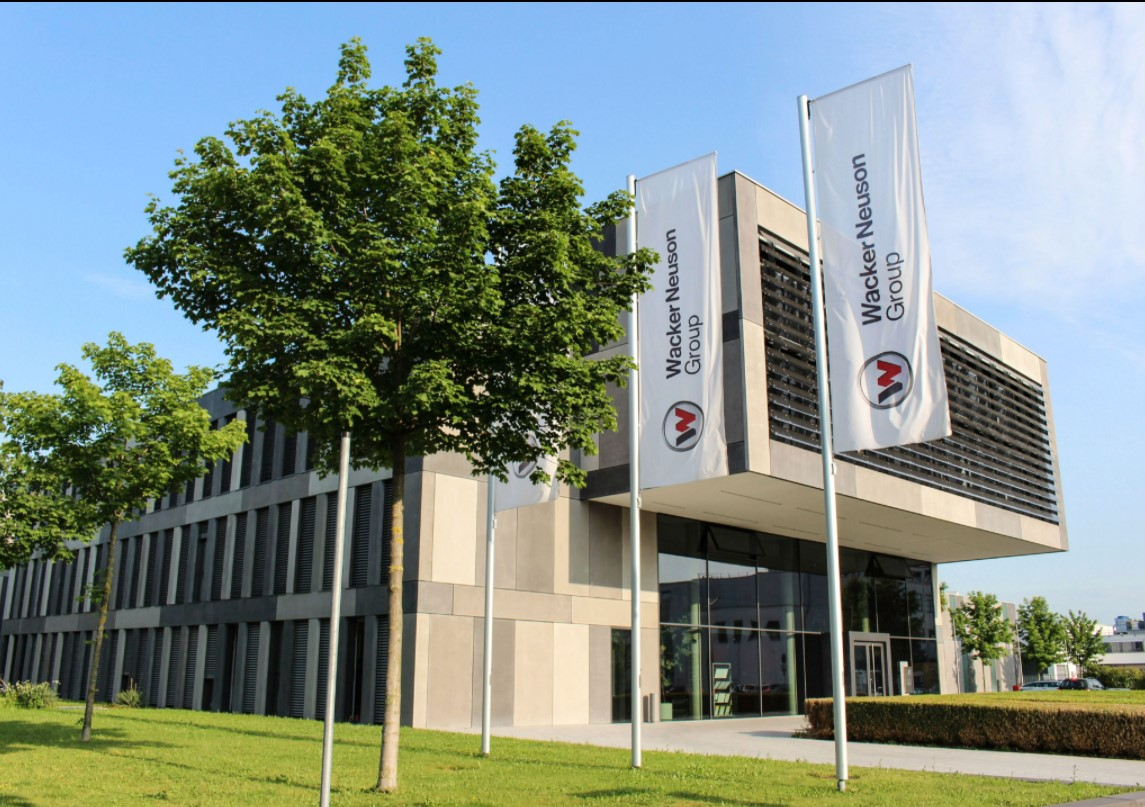
- Headquarters in Munich, Germany
- Company type: Societas Europaea
- Traded as: FWB: WAC; SDAX
- ISIN: DE000WACK012
- Industry: Construction equipment
- Founded: 1848
- Founder: Johann Christian Wacker
- Headquarters: Munich, Germany
- Area served: Worldwide
- Key people: Karl Tragl (CEO and chairman of the executive board); Felix Bietenbeck; Christoph Burkhard; Alexander Greschner; Hans Neunteufel (Chairman of the supervisory board)
- Revenue: €2.2 billion (2024)
- Number of employees: 6,000 (2025)
- Website: www.wackerneusongroup.com

Wacker Neuson SE is a German manufacturer of light and compact construction equipment. It is headquartered in Munich and listed on the Frankfurt Stock Exchange (SDAX). Founded in 1848 as a blacksmith’s workshop in Dresden, the company has since grown into an international group that includes the brands Wacker Neuson, Kramer, Weidemann, and Enar. The group operates production sites in Germany, Austria, the United States, China, and Serbia.

== History ==
In 1848, Johann Christian Wacker founded a forge workshop in Dresden, Germany, under the name "Wacker". Industrial production began in 1875. In the 1930s, Hermann Wacker invented the first electric rammer for soil compaction and developed high-frequency technology for internal concrete vibrators.

During World War II the Dresden facility was destroyed. Production resumed in 1945 at Kulmbach, and the company moved its headquarters to Munich in 1951. The first foreign affiliate was established in Hartford, Wisconsin in 1957 and was later relocated to Menomonee Falls in 1986, which is still the site of a production and logistics center.

In 2002, Wacker Construction Equipment GmbH reorganized as Wacker Construction Equipment AG. The company focused on light construction equipment, including concrete technology, compaction, and utility tools, before acquiring Weidemann GmbH, which enabled it in 2005 to enter the compact construction and agricultural equipment market. In 2006, it acquired Switzerland's Drillfix AG and the U.S. firm Ground Heaters Inc.

Wacker Construction Equipment AG was listed on the Frankfurt Stock Exchange on 15 May 2007 and joined the Prime Standard and SDAX indices later that year. On 31 October 2007, it merged with Neuson Kramer Baumaschinen AG (Linz, Austria), a manufacturer of compact excavators, wheel loaders, dumpers, and skid-steer loaders.

On 17 February 2009, the company changed its legal form to a Societas Europaea and adopted the name Wacker Neuson SE. Between 2011 and 2017, Wacker Neuson produced mini-excavators for Caterpillar at its Hörsching plant in Austria. In 2017, Kramer entered into an agreement with John Deere to market telehandlers and wheel loaders through Deere's dealer network.

In 2022, Wacker Neuson acquired Spain's Enarco S.A., a manufacturer of light concrete-compaction equipment based in Zaragoza, Spain.
