= Widemann =

Widemann is a German surname. Notable people with the surname include:

- Hermann A. Widemann, German businessman and Kingdom of Hawaii cabinet member
- Walter Widemann, Swiss fencer

== See also ==
- 20606 Widemann, a main-belt minor planet
- Wiedemann
