= Weidemann GmbH =

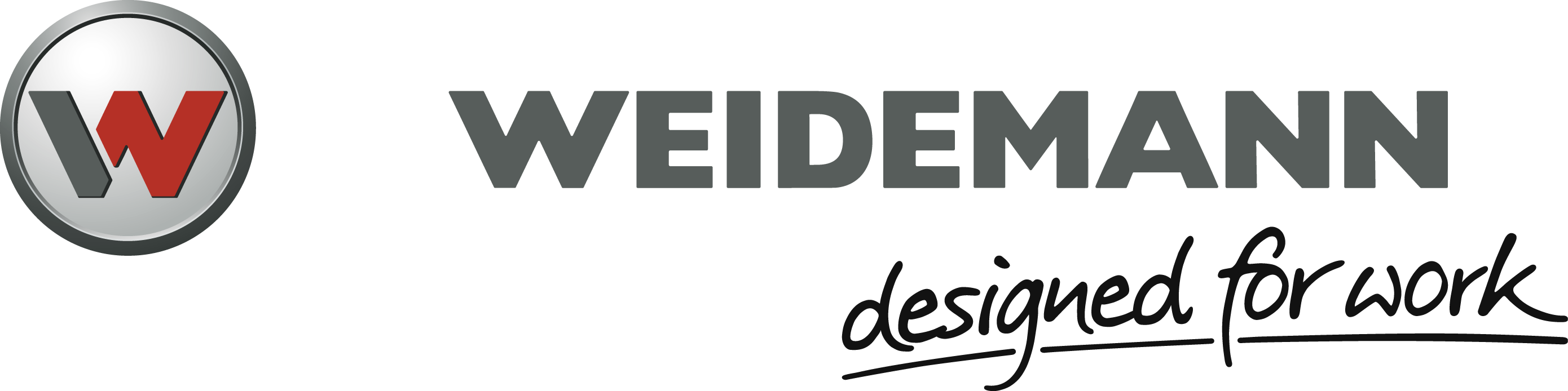
- Company type: Limited liability company (Gesellschaft mit beschränkter Haftung)
- Industry: Agricultural machinery, Agriculture
- Founded: 1960
- Headquarters: Diemelsee-Flechtdorf, Germany
- Key people: Bernd Apfelbeck (Commercial Director); Martin Eppinger (Technical Director)
- Revenue: 1.533,9 Mio. EUR (Corporate Turnover Wacker Neuson 2017)
- Number of employees: ca. 450 (2015)
- Website: www.weidemann.de

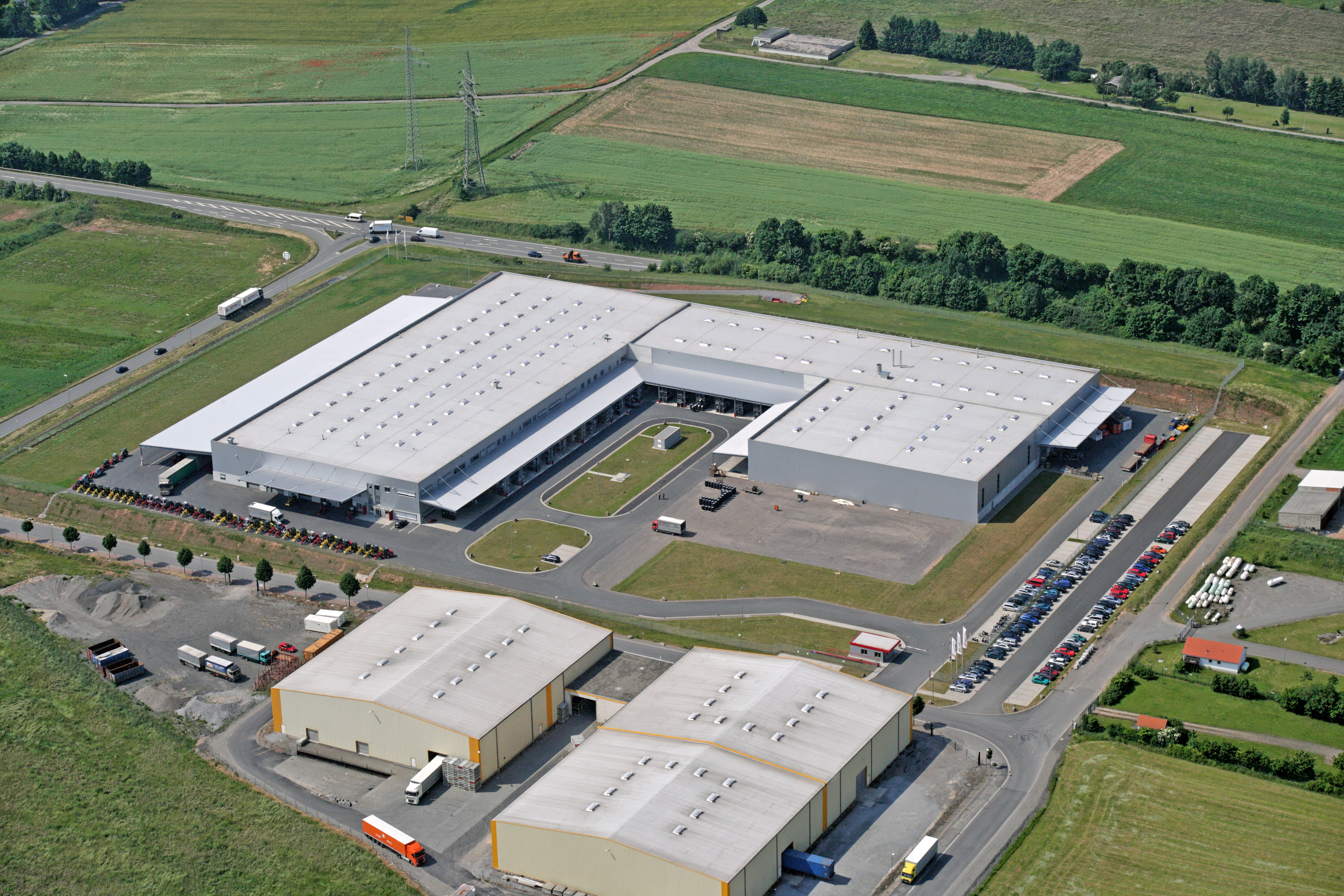
Weidemann production plant in Korbach

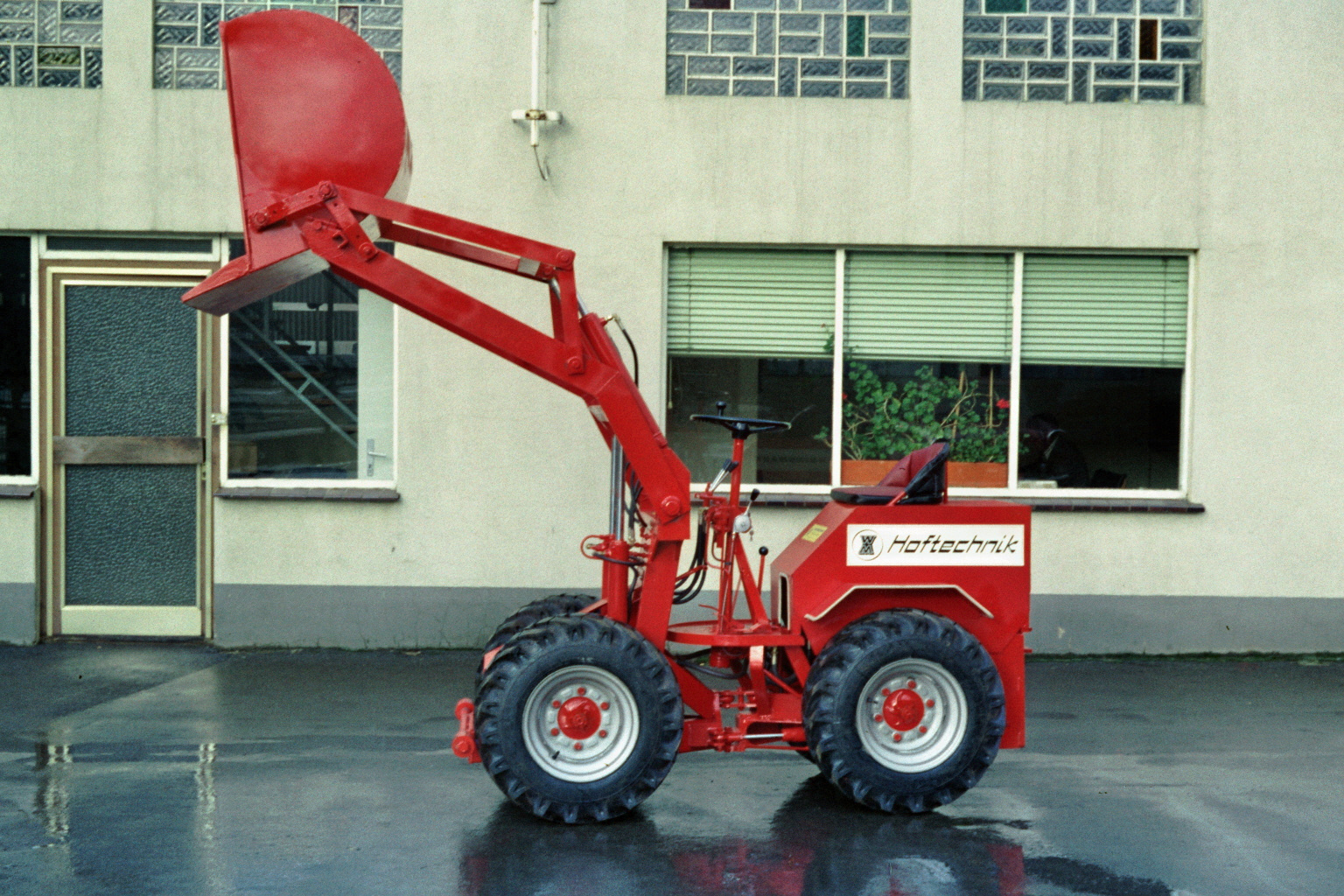
Weidemann Hoftrac WSTS 130 FD from 1974

Weidemann GmbH is a multinational agricultural machinery company based in Diemelsee-Flechtdorf in the district of Waldeck-Frankenberg in Hesse, Germany. It produces Hoftracs, wheel loaders, telescopic wheel loaders and telehandlers, which are preferably used on farmland for feeding, scattering, fertilising, loading and stacking. The company has sites in Diemelsee-Flechtdorf and Korbach, and is part of the Wacker Neuson group.

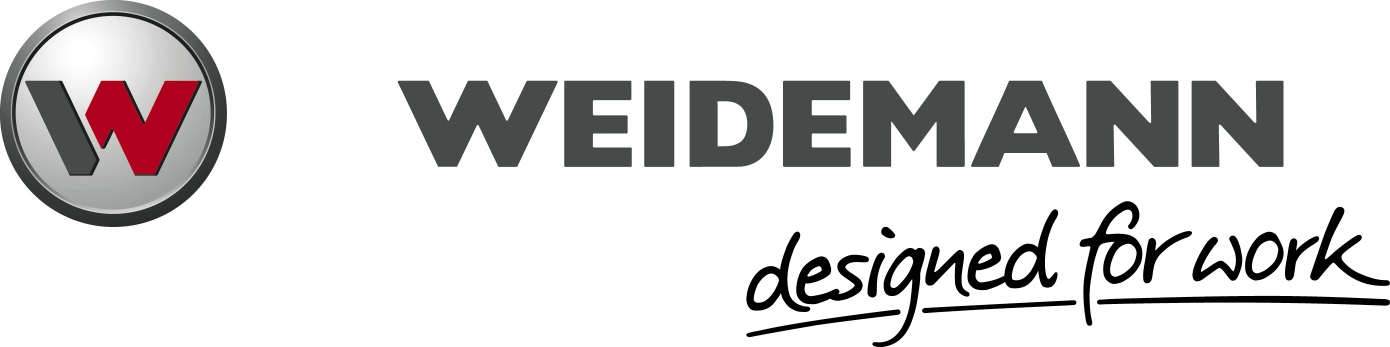

== History ==
Maschinenfabrik Weidemann KG was founded in 1960, in Diemelsee-Flechtdorf (Hesse, Germany). From 1960 to 1972, the company focused on production of farmyard equipment and dung removal equipment. In 1972, Weidemann invented the Hoftrac farm crane. This small, articulated machine was specifically designed for narrow and low farmyard buildings.

In 1979, the company was renamed as Weidemann GmbH & Co. KG. Weidemann continued to expand over the next few years. In the early 1990s, the first foreign affiliate was established in the Netherlands and operations commenced at plant III in Gotha (Thuringia, Germany).

In 2005, the company then known as Wacker Construction Equipment AG (now Wacker Neuson SE) acquired Weidemann. This involved a further expansion of production capacity. The production plant in Korbach was completed in 2007. Since then, Weidemann GmbH has been a wholly owned affiliate of Wacker Neuson SE.

Weidemann machines are sold in over 30 countries worldwide by in-house organisations in close cooperation with specialist dealers. Since 1960, Weidemann has produced more than 65,000 machines (up to 2011).

In April 2021, the traditional location in Diemelsee-Flechtdorf was abandoned with the move into a new administration building, training center and technology center. The company location is therefore entirely in Korbach.

== Locations ==
- Diemelsee-Flechtdorf, Germany (administration, design, testing)
- Korbach, Germany (production)

== Products ==
- Hoftracs: 1.5 to 3.0 tonnes
- Wheel loader: 3.2 to 11 tonnes
- Tele wheel loader: 3.7 to 7.2 tonnes
- Telehandler: 0.8 to 2.7 tonnes
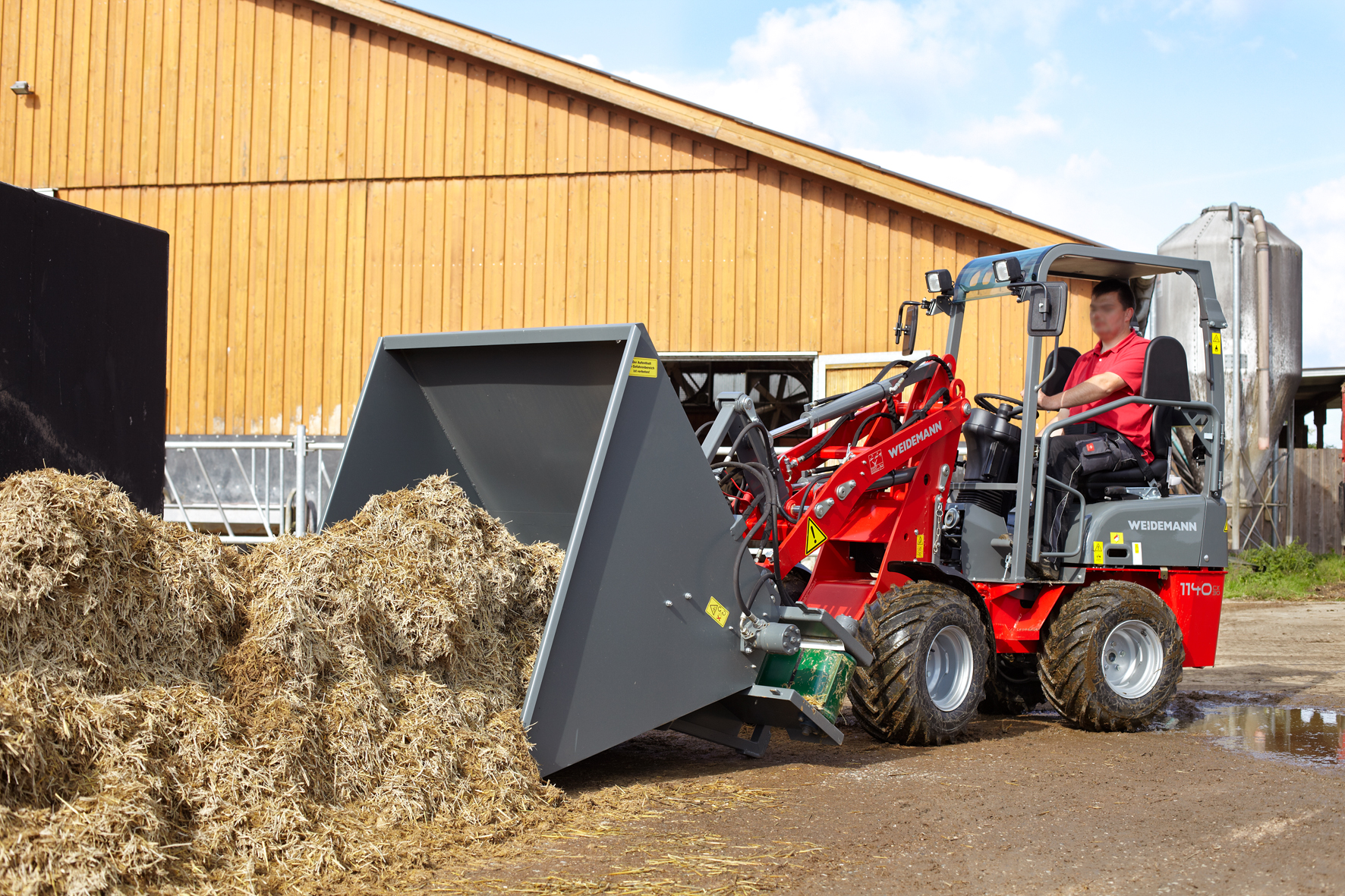
Weidemann Hoftrac 1140 CX30

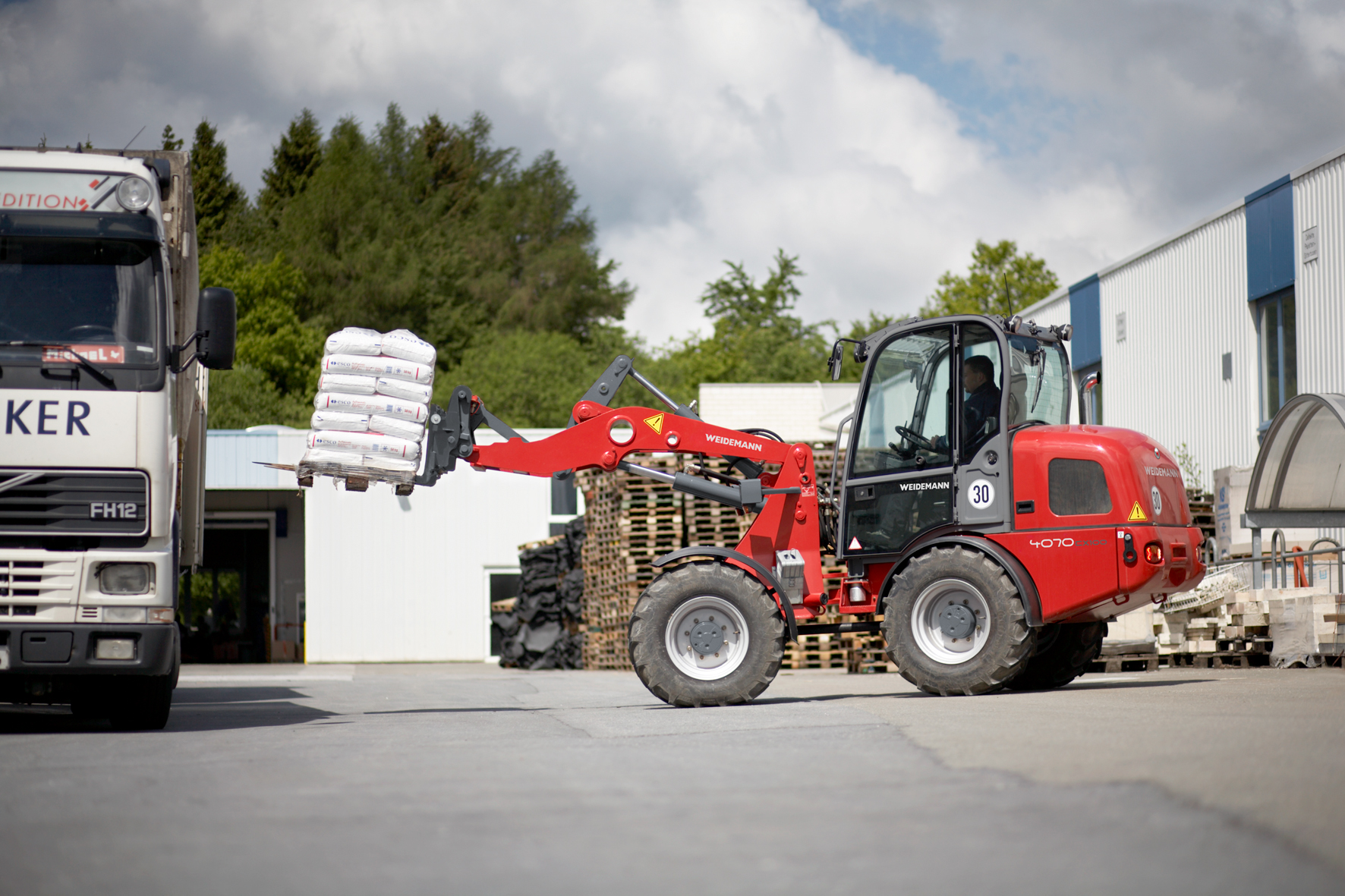
Weidemann Wheel loader 4070 CX100

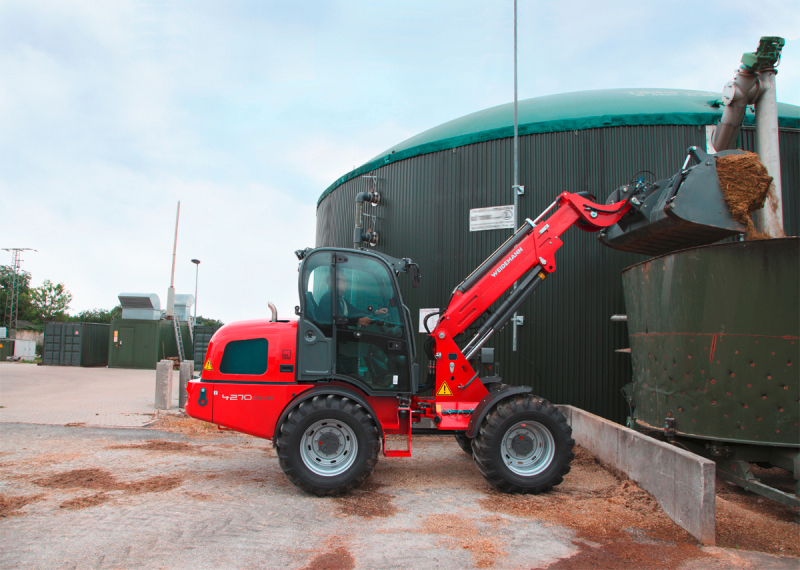
Weidemann Tele wheel loader 4270 CX100 T

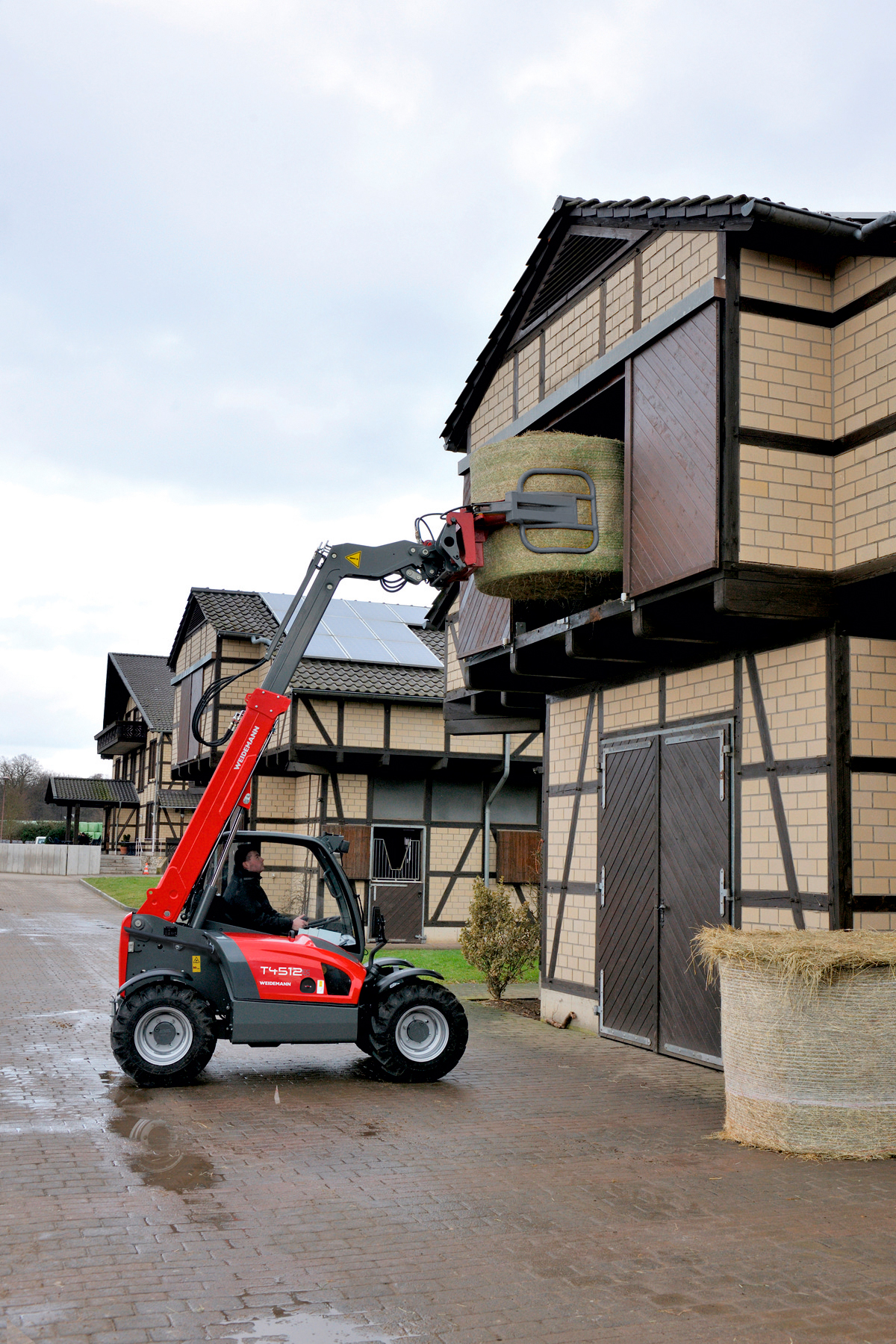
Weidemann Telehandler T4512 CC40
