= Kehrsatz =

- Municipality
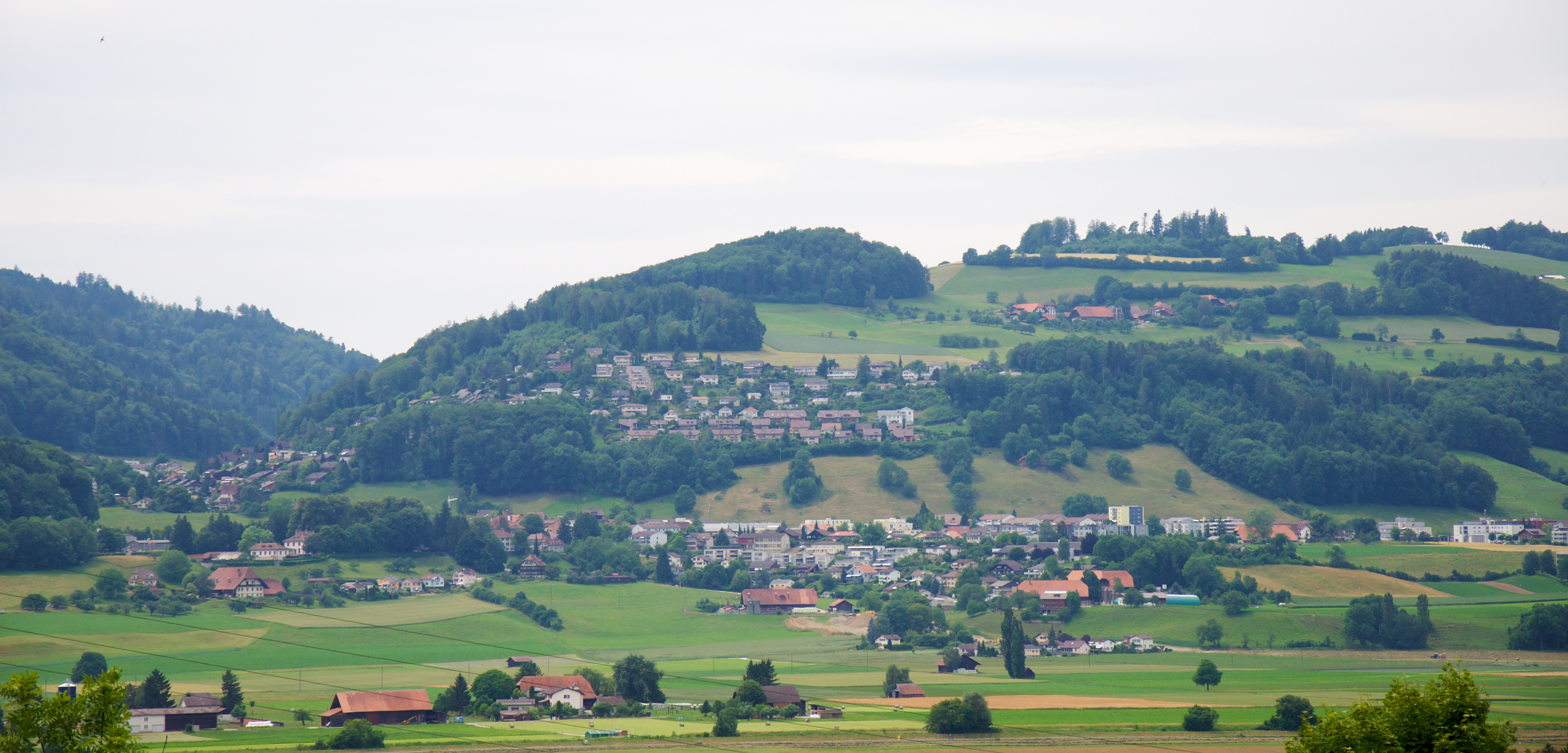
- Kehrsatz village

- Flag Coat of arms
- Location of Kehrsatz
- Location within Switzerland Location within Canton of Bern
- Coordinates: 46°55′N 7°28′E
- Country: Switzerland
- Canton: Bern
- District: Bern-Mittelland

Government
  - Executive: Gemeinderat with 5 members
  - Mayor: Gemeindepräsident; Christoph Läderach FDP/PLR (as of 2026)

Area
  - Total: 4.4 km^{2} (1.7 sq mi)
- Elevation: 570 m (1,870 ft)

Population (December 2020)
  - Total: 4,380
  - Density: 1,000/km^{2} (2,600/sq mi)
- Time zone: UTC+01:00 (CET)
  - Summer (DST): UTC+02:00 (CEST)
- Postal code: 3122
- SFOS number: 870
- ISO 3166 code: CH-BE
- Surrounded by: Belp, Köniz, Muri bei Bern, Wald
- Website: www.kehrsatz.ch

Kehrsatz is a municipality in the Bern-Mittelland administrative district in the canton of Bern in Switzerland.

== History ==
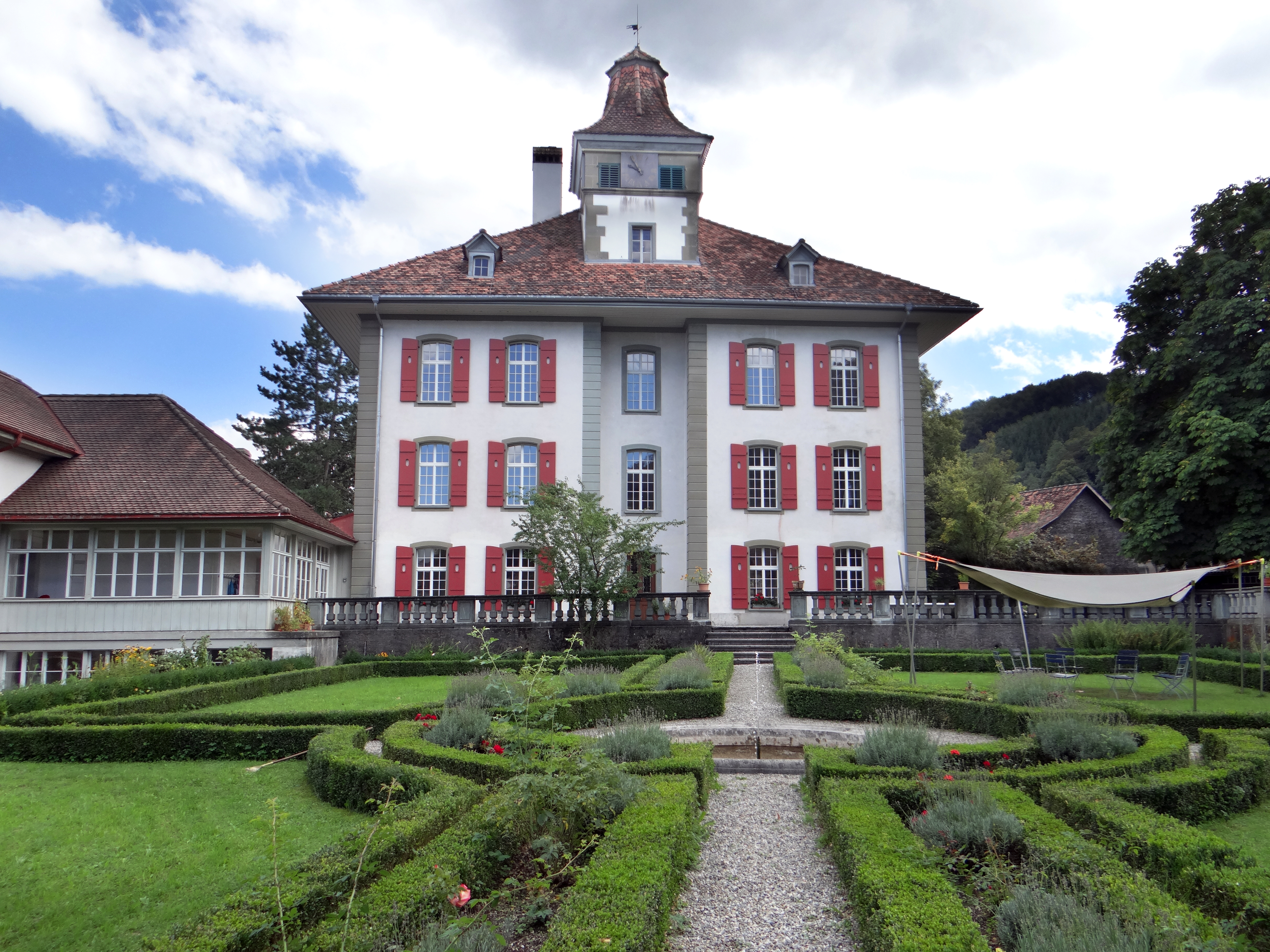
Kehrsatz Castle

Aerial view (1967)

Kehrsatz is first mentioned in 1281 as Kersaz.

The oldest trace of a settlement in the area are some La Tène graves which were discovered under Zimmerwaldstrasse 27. During the Roman era there was a well developed village of Gallo-Roman farm houses at the Maygut - Breitenacker area. A horde of Roman coins was also discovered in the Gurtental. By the Middle Ages the village was part of the Belp-Montenach Herrschaft. By the 13th century a number of Bernese nobles and local monasteries owned pieces of the village and surrounding farms. Gradually, Bern acquired a majority of rights in Kehrsatz and by the 15th century had the low court right over the village. In the following century their power expanded to include the Zwing or Twing rights.

In 1388, the village became part of the Bernese district of Seftigen. Kehrsatz Castle was built in the 14th century for the local administrator. It was rebuilt in the 16th century and renovated several times since then. Over the centuries, a number of Bernese patrician families ruled over Kehrsatz. This all changed following the 1798 French invasion, and creation of the Helvetic Republic. Kehrsatz became an independent municipality in the Canton of Bern. The Canton acquired the Castle and in 1888 turned it into a girls boarding school. Today it is a Cantonal boarding school.

In the late 19th and early 20th century, a new highway and the Gürbetal-Bern-Schwarzenburg railroad (now part of the BLS) tied Kehrsatz closely with Bern. In the 1960s Bern grew rapidly and Kehrsatz became a suburb and part of the agglomeration of Bern. In 1969, a primary and secondary school opened in Selhofen for the growing population.

== Geography ==
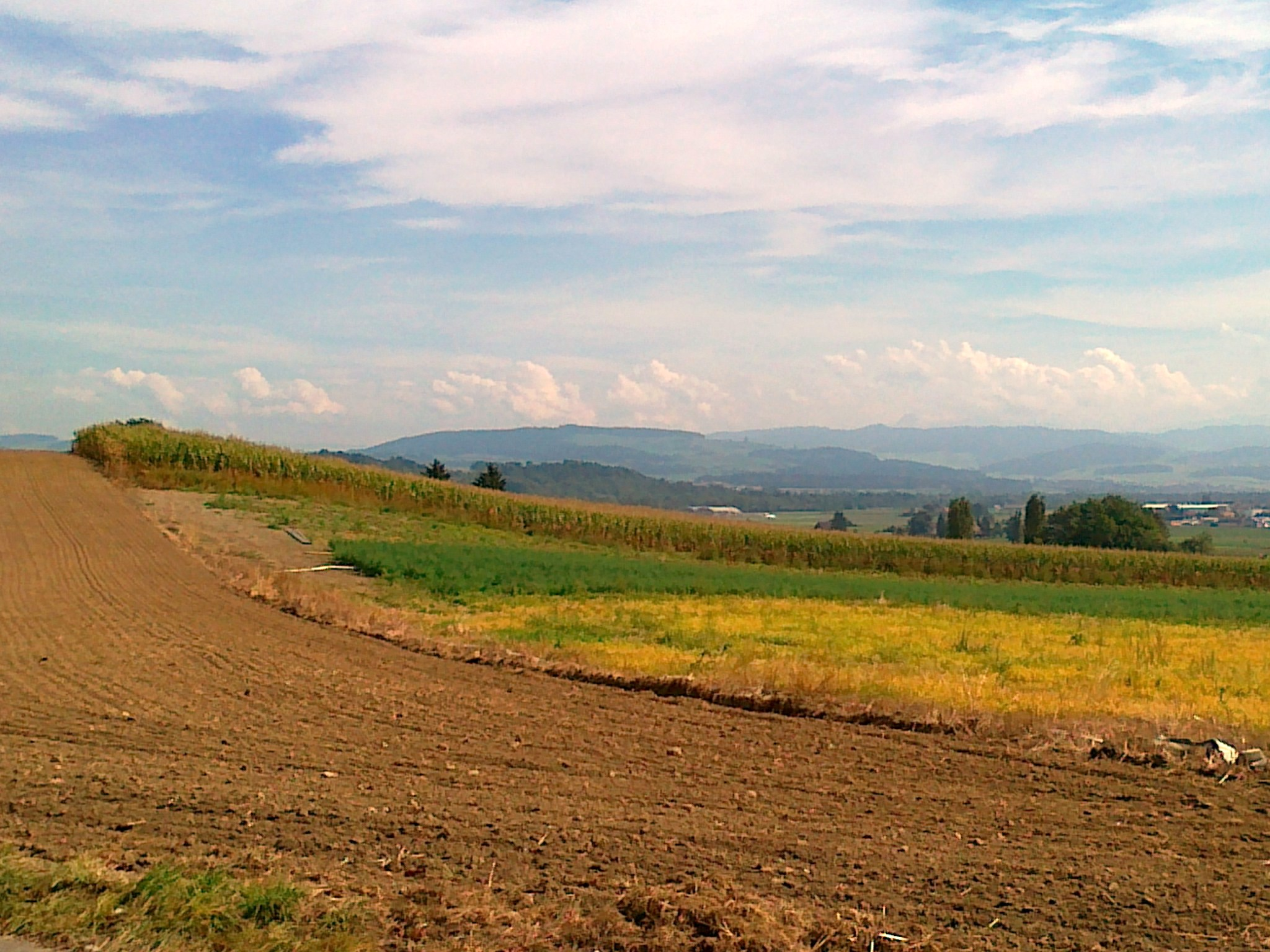
The Belpmoos and an Agricultural land.

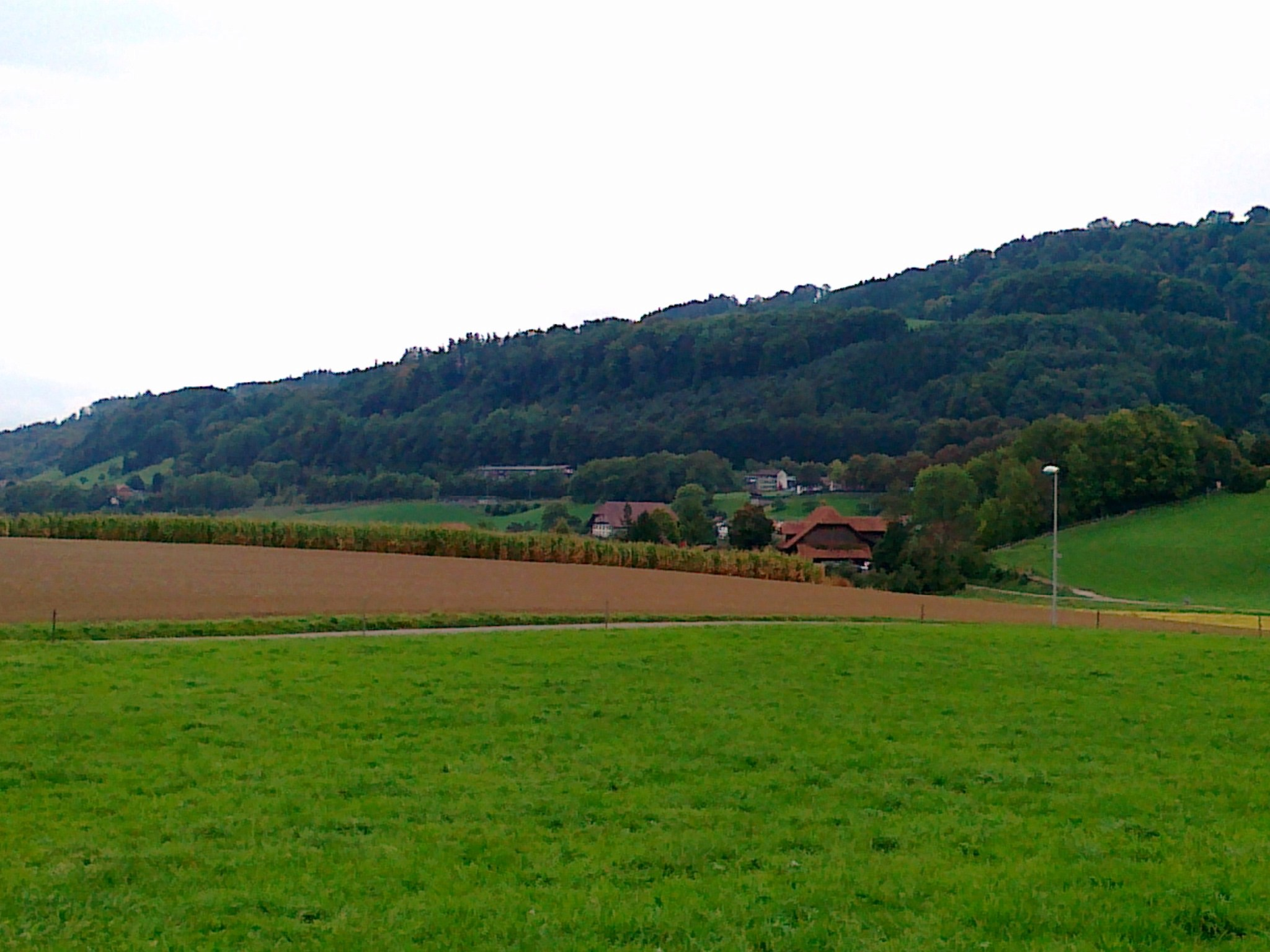
School Complex Selhofen (right), Farm Liechti (middle) and Belp (left) viewed from Eichenrain

Kehrsatz has an area of 4.44 km^{2} (1.71 sq mi). As of 2012, a total of 2.42 km^{2} (0.93 mi^{2}) or 54.5% is used for agricultural purposes, while 0.99 km^{2} (0.38 mi^{2}) or 22.3% is forested. The rest of the municipality is 0.94 km^{2} (0.36 mi^{2}) or 21.2% is settled (buildings or roads), 0.06 km^{2} (15 acres) or 1.4% is either rivers or lakes and 0.02 km^{2} (4.9 acres) or 0.5% is unproductive land.

During the same year, industrial buildings made up 1.6% of the total area while housing and buildings made up 14.4% and transportation infrastructure made up 4.1%. A total of 20.7% of the total land area is heavily forested and 1.6% is covered with orchards or small clusters of trees. Of the agricultural land, 33.1% is used for growing crops and 18.9% is pasturage, while 2.5% is used for orchards or vine crops. All the water in the municipality is flowing water.

The municipality is located on a terrasse on the south-east slope of the Gurten.

On 31 December 2009 Amtsbezirk Seftigen, the municipality's former district, was dissolved. On the following day, 1 January 2010, it joined the newly created Verwaltungskreis Bern-Mittelland.

== Coat of arms ==
The blazon of the municipal coat of arms is Azure two Bendlets Or and a Mullet of the same in chief sinister.

== Demographics ==
Corporate design

Kehrsatz has a population (as of December 2020) of 4,380. As of 2012, 19.0% of the population are resident foreign nationals. Over the last 2 years (2010-2012) the population has changed at a rate of 0.9%. Migration accounted for -0.8%, while births and deaths accounted for 1.0%.

Most of the population (as of 2000) speaks German (3,225 or 86.9%) as their first language, French is the second most common (74 or 2.0%) and Italian is the third (70 or 1.9%). There are 7 people who speak Romansh.

As of 2008, the population was 48.9% male and 51.1% female. The population was made up of 1,647 Swiss men (40.3% of the population) and 352 (8.6%) non-Swiss men. There were 1,745 Swiss women (42.7%) and 340 (8.3%) non-Swiss women. Of the population in the municipality, 660 or about 17.8% were born in Kehrsatz and lived there in 2000. There were 1,679 or 45.3% who were born in the same canton, while 608 or 16.4% were born somewhere else in Switzerland, and 608 or 16.4% were born outside of Switzerland.

As of 2012, children and teenagers (0–19 years old) make up 21.8% of the population, while adults (20–64 years old) make up 57.9% and seniors (over 64 years old) make up 20.3%.

As of 2000, there were 1,487 people who were single and never married in the municipality. There were 1,901 married individuals, 166 widows or widowers and 156 individuals who are divorced.

As of 2010, there were 514 households that consist of only one person and 119 households with five or more people. In 2000, a total of 1,452 apartments (91.3% of the total) were permanently occupied, while 95 apartments (6.0%) were seasonally occupied and 43 apartments (2.7%) were empty. As of 2012, the construction rate of new housing units was 0.9708737864 new units per 1000 residents. The vacancy rate for the municipality, in 2013, was 1.2605042017%. In 2011, single family homes made up 58.8% of the total housing in the municipality.

The historical population is given in the following chart:

== Heritage sites of national significance ==
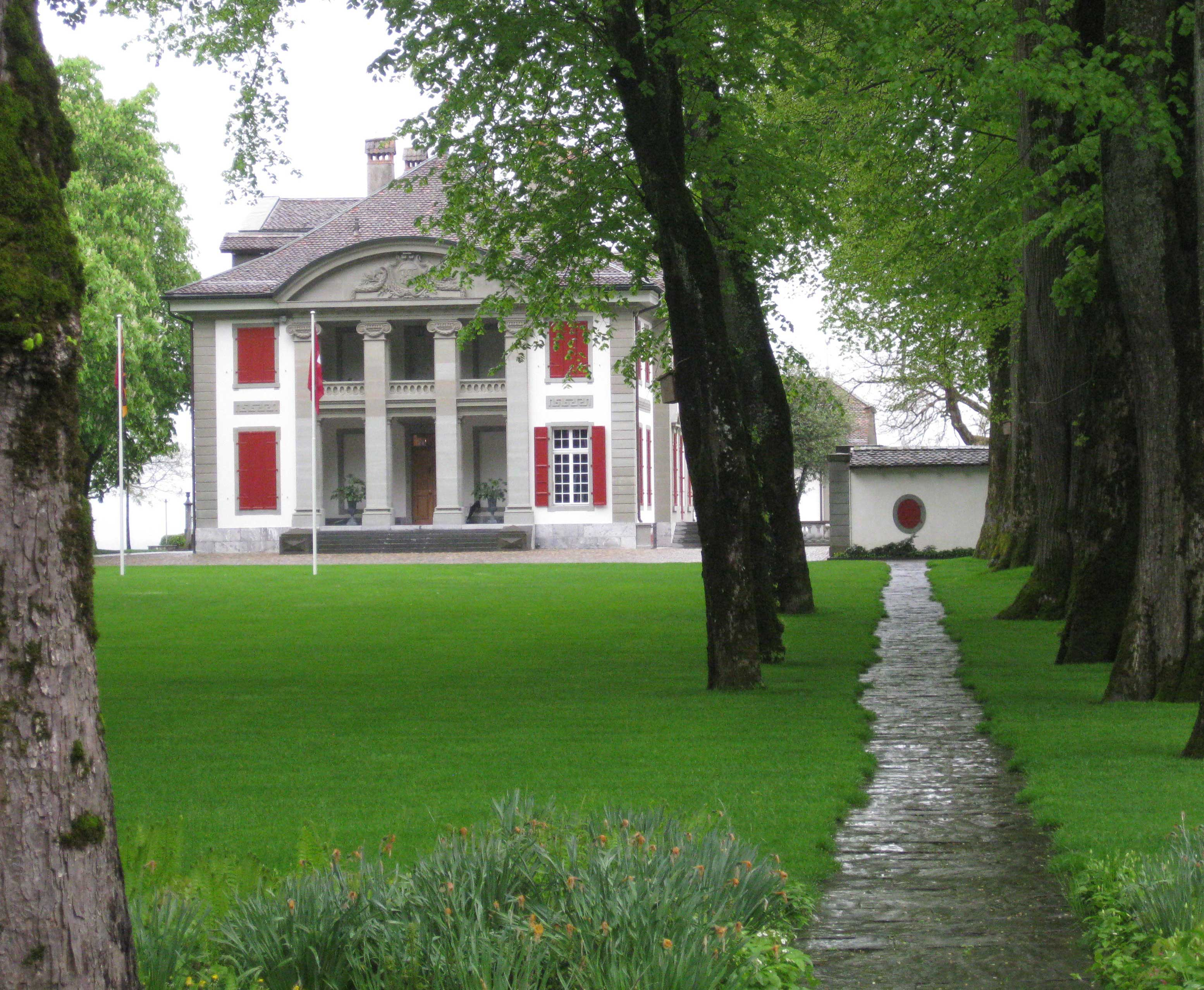
Landsitz Lohn

The country estate or Landsitz Lohn is listed as a Swiss heritage site of national significance.

== Politics ==
In the 2011 federal election the most popular party was the Swiss People's Party (SVP) which received 25% of the vote. The next three most popular parties were the Social Democratic Party (SP) (18.8%), the Conservative Democratic Party (BDP) (14%) and the FDP.The Liberals (10.5%). In the federal election, a total of 1,645 votes were cast, and the voter turnout was 59.3%.

== Economy ==
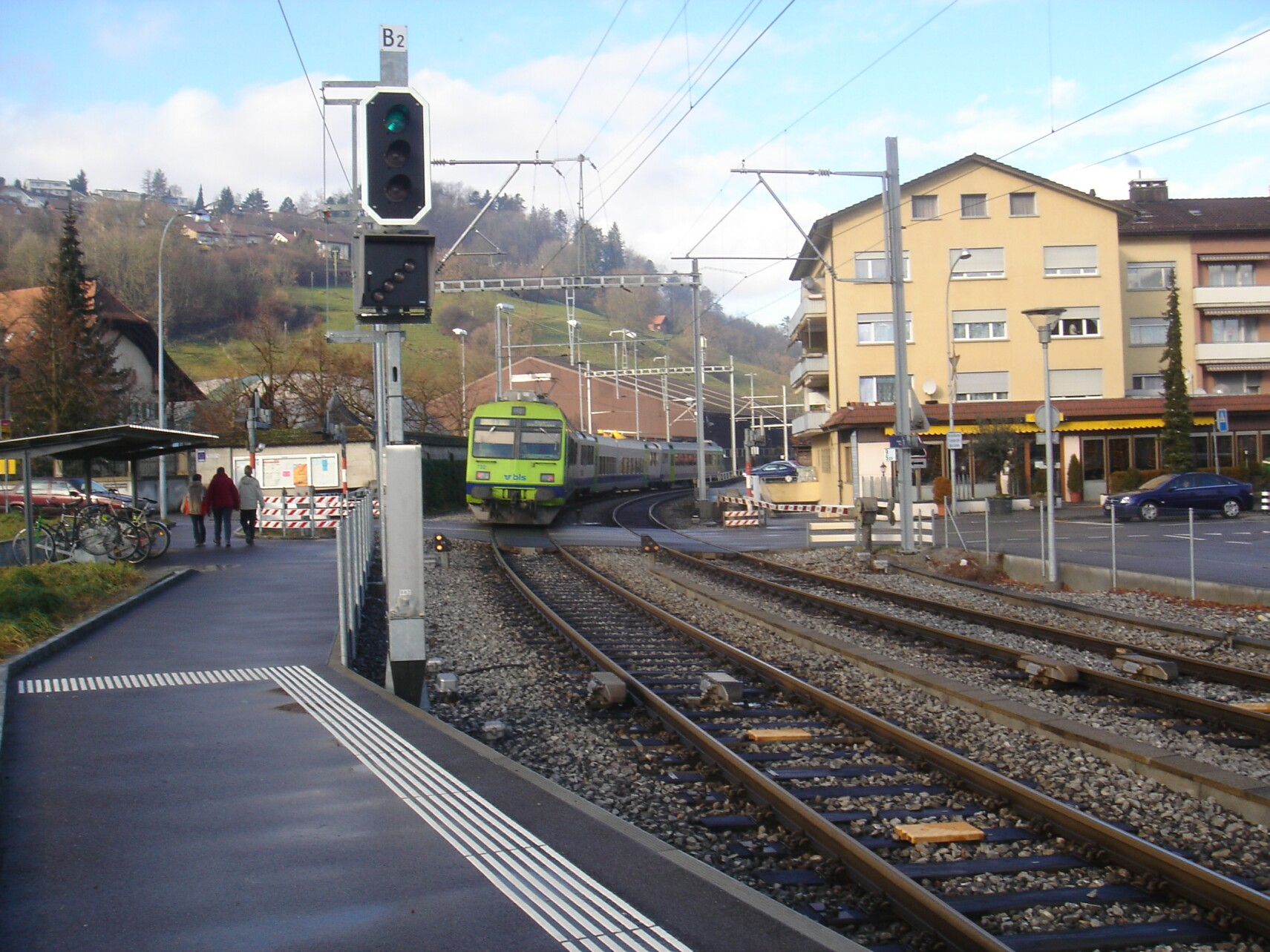
Kehrsatz rail station. About three-quarters of the working population commute for jobs

As of 2011, Kehrsatz had an unemployment rate of 2.31%. As of 2011, there were a total of 948 people employed in the municipality. Of these, there were 59 people employed in the primary economic sector and about 17 businesses involved in this sector. 200 people were employed in the secondary sector and there were 41 businesses in this sector. 689 people were employed in the tertiary sector, with 154 businesses in this sector. There were 1,973 residents of the municipality who were employed in some capacity, of which females made up 43.6% of the workforce.

In 2008 there were a total of 669 full-time equivalent jobs. The number of jobs in the primary sector was 35, all of which were in agriculture. The number of jobs in the secondary sector was 162 of which 90 or (55.6%) were in manufacturing and 72 (44.4%) were in construction. The number of jobs in the tertiary sector was 472. In the tertiary sector; 177 or 37.5% were in wholesale or retail sales or the repair of motor vehicles, 36 or 7.6% were in the movement and storage of goods, 20 or 4.2% were in a hotel or restaurant, 46 or 9.7% were in the information industry, 8 or 1.7% were the insurance or financial industry, 19 or 4.0% were technical professionals or scientists, 43 or 9.1% were in education and 66 or 14.0% were in health care.

In 2000, there were 675 workers who commuted into the municipality and 1,607 workers who commuted away. The municipality is a net exporter of workers, with about 2.4 workers leaving the municipality for every one entering. A total of 366 workers (35.2% of the 1,041 total workers in the municipality) both lived and worked in Kehrsatz. Of the working population, 34.5% used public transportation to get to work, and 44.8% used a private car.

In 2011 the average local and cantonal tax rate on a married resident, with two children, of Kehrsatz making 150,000 CHF was 12%, while an unmarried resident's rate was 17.6%. For comparison, the average rate for the entire canton in the same year, was 14.2% and 22.0%, while the nationwide average was 12.3% and 21.1% respectively.

In 2009 there were a total of 1,698 tax payers in the municipality. Of that total, 751 made over 75,000 CHF per year. There were 13 people who made between 15,000 and 20,000 per year. The average income of the over 75,000 CHF group in Kehrsatz was 125,250 CHF, while the average across all of Switzerland was 130,478 CHF.

In 2011 a total of 5.9% of the population received direct financial assistance from the government.

== Religion ==
From the 2000 census, 2,253 or 60.7% belonged to the Swiss Reformed Church, while 624 or 16.8% were Roman Catholic. Of the rest of the population, there were 78 members of an Orthodox church (or about 2.10% of the population), there was 1 individual who belongs to the Christian Catholic Church, and there were 110 individuals (or about 2.96% of the population) who belonged to another Christian church. There were 10 individuals (or about 0.27% of the population) who were Jewish, and 159 (or about 4.29% of the population) who were Muslim. There were 5 individuals who were Buddhist, 45 individuals who were Hindu and 2 individuals who belonged to another church. 295 (or about 7.95% of the population) belonged to no church, are agnostic or atheist, and 128 individuals (or about 3.45% of the population) did not answer the question.

== Education ==
In Kehrsatz about 52.7% of the population have completed non-mandatory upper secondary education, and 25.8% have completed additional higher education (either university or a Fachhochschule). Of the 652 who had completed some form of tertiary schooling listed in the census, 68.9% were Swiss men, 22.1% were Swiss women, 6.0% were non-Swiss men and 3.1% were non-Swiss women.

The Canton of Bern school system provides one year of non-obligatory Kindergarten, followed by six years of Primary school. This is followed by three years of obligatory lower Secondary school where the students are separated according to ability and aptitude. Following the lower Secondary students may attend additional schooling or they may enter an apprenticeship.

During the 2011-12 school year, there were a total of 503 students attending classes in Kehrsatz. There were 4 kindergarten classes with a total of 77 students in the municipality. Of the kindergarten students, 24.7% were permanent or temporary residents of Switzerland (not citizens) and 29.9% have a different mother language than the classroom language. The municipality had 14 primary classes and 249 students. Of the primary students, 25.3% were permanent or temporary residents of Switzerland (not citizens) and 39.8% have a different mother language than the classroom language. During the same year, there were 9 lower secondary classes with a total of 166 students. There were 16.3% who were permanent or temporary residents of Switzerland (not citizens) and 27.7% have a different mother language than the classroom language. The remainder of the students attend a private or special school.

As of 2000, there were a total of 389 students attending any school in the municipality. Of those, 352 both lived and attended school in the municipality, while 37 students came from another municipality. During the same year, 166 residents attended schools outside the municipality.

Kehrsatz is home to the Dorfbibliothek Kehrsatz library. The library has (as of 2008) 5,268 books or other media, and loaned out 6,179 items in the same year. It was open a total of 127 days with average of 6 hours per week during that year.
