= Weideman =

Weideman is a German surname derived from the meaning "hunter". Notable people with the surname include:

- Carl M. Weideman (1898–1972), American politician
- Francois Weideman (1960–2001), South African cricketer
- George Weideman (1947–2008), South African poet and writer
- Graeme Weideman (1934–2023), Australian pharmacist and politician
- Jaap Weideman (1936–1996), South African admiral
- Mark Weideman (born 1961), Australian rules footballer
- Murray Weideman (1936–2021), Australian rules footballer
- Peter Weideman (1940–2012), Australian rules footballer
- Sam Weideman (born 1997), Australian rules footballer
