= Weidmann =

Weidmann is a German surname derived from the meaning "hunter". Notable people with the surname include:

- Cédric Weidmann (born 1991), Swiss writer, philologist and literary promoter.
- Chris Weidman (born 1984), former World Champion in Mixed Martial Arts – UFC Middleweight Champion.
- Daouda Weidmann (born 2003), French footballer
- Eugen Weidmann (1908–1939), German convict who was the last to be publicly executed in France
- Jens Weidmann (born 1968), president of Deutsche Bundesbank
- Jozef Weidmann (1899–1962), Dutch-Surinamese Catholic priest, politician and union leader
- Karl Weidmann (born 1931), Swiss rower
- Manfred Weidmann (born 1945), German footballer
- Moritz Georg Weidmann (1686–1743), German publisher and bookseller, son of the Elder

== See also ==
- Weidmann's Restaurant, a restaurant in Meridian, Mississippi owned since 1870 by the Swiss-born Felix Weidmann and his family
