= Weidemann =

Weidemann is a German surname derived from the meaning "hunter". Notable people with the surname include:

- Anders Weidemann (born 1971), Swedish screenwriter and producer
- Isabelle Weidemann (born 1995), Canadian speed skater
- Jakob Weidemann (1923–2001), Norwegian painter
- Magnus Weidemann (1880–1967), German evangelist, photographer and painter

== See also ==
- Weidemann GmbH, a manufacturer of agricultural equipment
