= Cédric Weidmann =

Swiss writer, philologist and literary promoter

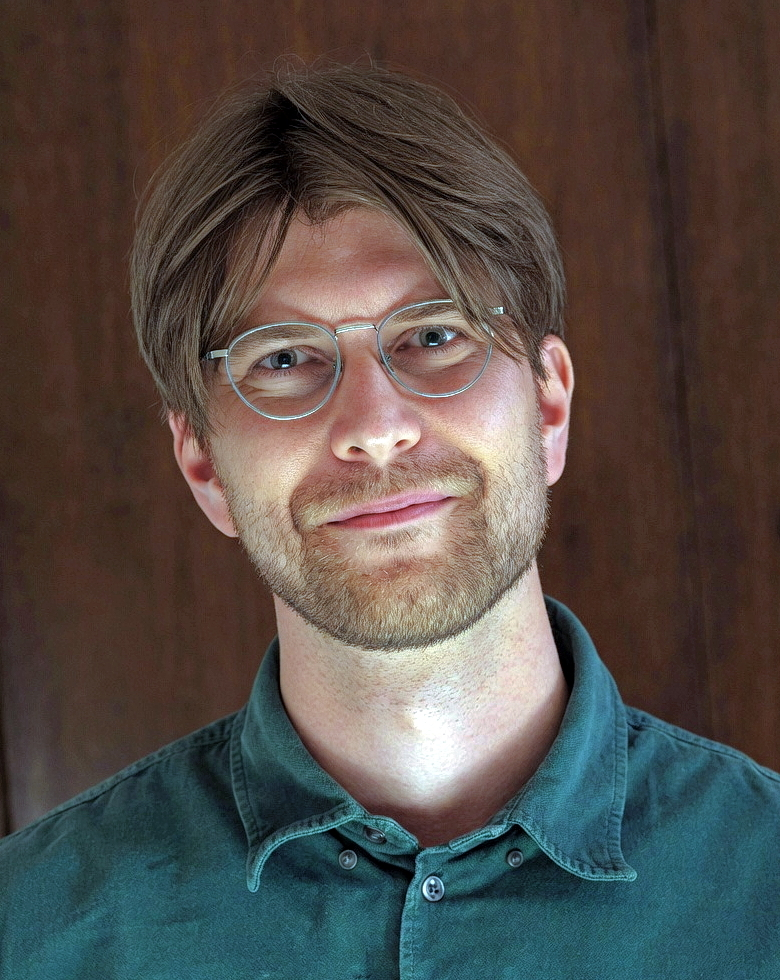
- Born: 29 July 1991 (age 35); Affoltern am Albis, Affoltern District, Canton of Zurich, Switzerland
- Citizenship: Switzerland
- Education: ETH Zurich
- Occupations: Writer, philologist, literary promoter
- Writing career
- Language: German
- Genres: Short prose, essay
- Notable awards: Wartholz Literary Prize (2017)
- Website: cedricweidmann.ch

Cédric Weidmann (born 29 July 1991) is a Swiss writer, philologist and literary promoter. He holds a doctorate from the ETH Zurich (2022).

== Biography ==
In 2006, at the age of 15, Cédric Weidmann created his first author literary blog. He participated in cantonal and national literary competitions, published in literary periodicals, studied and then taught Germanistics, literary theory, and economic history at ETH Zurich.

Since 2013, he has been a member of the editorial board of the Zurich countercultural magazine delirium.

In 2022, he defended his doctoral dissertation, "Anticipating Nostalgia. Calculating the transformation of language and capital" (German: Antizipation der Nostalgie. Das Kalkül der Verklärung von Sprache und Kapital), in which, based on the material of science fiction works and political-economic theories, including the Marxist theory of surplus value, he developed a typology of nostalgia as a sociocultural phenomenon that devalues the past in favor of the future ("productive" type) or the future in favor of the past ("extractive" type). In the same year, he became the head of the Aargauer Literaturhaus in Lenzburg, an institution in whose work he had been actively involved since 2009.

Weidmann has published short stories, articles, essays on science fiction, futurology, video games, collective literary practices, and the relationship between literature and economics in various German-language media, including delirium, entwürfe, Das Magazin, Das Narr (Switzerland), The Gap (Austria), Süddeutsche Zeitung, litradio (Germany), the thematic anthology Biocatalyst. Psychoactive Literature (German: Wirkstoff. Psychoaktive Literatur, 2022), etc.

Weidmann is the silver medallist of the Swiss Philosophy Olympiad (2010), winner of the national literary competition Permanent Place (German: Stammplatz, 2011) and the Wartholz Literary Prize (Austria, 2017).

== Bibliography ==
Dissertation

- Weidmann C. (2022). "Abstract/Zusammenfassung" (PDF). Antizipation der Nostalgie. Das Kalkül der Verklärung von Sprache und Kapital: Abhandlung zur Erlangung des Titels Doktor der Wissenschaften (Dr. sc. ETH Zürich). Zürich: [ETH]. doi:10.3929/ethz-b-000602289. hdl:20.500.11850/602289.
  - Ditto (book): Weidmann C. (2025). Antizipation der Nostalgie. Das Kalkül der Verklärung von Sprache und Kapital. Berlin: Verbrecher Verlag. ISBN 978-3-957-32633-1.

Articles, essays

- Weidmann C. (May 2013). "Eine Chance". Literaturhaus Zürich.
- Weidmann C. (September 30, 2016). "Filmische Buchbesprechung zum Werk Kracht, Christian. (2016). Die Toten: Roman (2. Auflage ed.). Köln: Kiepenheuer & Witsch". Zenodo.
- Weidmann C. (October 8, 2018). "Der diskrete Charme des angewandten Ballardismus. Mark Fisher, Nina Power, Nick Land: Was hat es auf sich mit der Begeisterung so vieler Zukunftsphilosophen für J. G. Ballard?". Süddeutsche Zeitung.
- Weidmann C., Fanzun S. (2019). "Randkulturen. Lese- und Gebrauchsspuren in Autorenbibliotheken des 19. und 20. Jahrhundertss (Tagung in Zürich v. 15.–17.11.2018)" (PDF). Zeitschrift für Germanistik. 29 (3). Bern: Peter Lang: 620–621. doi:10.3726/92165_620.
- Fanzun S., Weidmann C. (April 1, 2020). "How Likely Is It to Be a Bat?". Pop-Zeitschrift.
- Weidmann C. (2022). "Letzte Besorgnisse". Wirkstoff. Psychoaktive Literatur: Anthologie. Niki Grieser, Patrizia Huber (Hg.). Zürich: Skalpell Verlag, delirium. ISBN 978-3-9525-0064-4.
