= Weidman =

Weidman is a German surname derived from the meaning "hunter". Notable people with the surname include:

- Charles Weidman (1901–1975), American modern dancer, choreographer and teacher
- Chris Weidman (born 1984), American mixed martial artist
- Jerome Weidman (1913–1998), Jewish American playwright and novelist
- John Weidman, American librettist and staff writer for Sesame Street

== See also ==
- Weidman, Michigan
