= Wiedemann =

Wiedemann is a German surname. Notable people with the surname include:

- Anna Wiedemann, one of the married names of Anna Leibbrand (1902–1972), German political activist and writer
- Barbara Wiedemann (born 1945), American poet
- Charlotte Wiedemann (born 1954), German author and journalist
- Christian Rudolph Wilhelm Wiedemann (1770–1840), German physician, historian, naturalist
- Elisabeth Wiedemann (1926–2015), German actress
- Ferdinand Johann Wiedemann (1805–1887), Baltic German linguist
- Fritz Wiedemann (1891–1970), German soldier, Nazi Party activist and diplomat
- George Wiedemann (1833–1890), German American brewer
- Gustav Heinrich Wiedemann (1826–1899), German physicist
- Eilhard Wiedemann (1852–1928), German physicist and historian of science
- Alfred Wiedemann (1856–1936), German Egyptologist
- Hermann Wiedemann (1879–1944), German operatic baritone and teacher
- Kent M. Wiedemann, American diplomat
- Elettra Rossellini Wiedemann (born 1983), American fashion model
- Thorsten Wiedemann (born 1985), German rugby player
- Thomas Ernst Josef Wiedemann (1950–2001), German-British historian

== See also ==
- Wiedemann–Franz law, named after Gustav Heinrich Wiedemann
- Wiedemann Range
- Wiedeman
- Wiedmann
- Wiedermann
