= Lohn Estate =

Manor in Kehrsatz, Switzerland

- Landsitz Lohn (German)
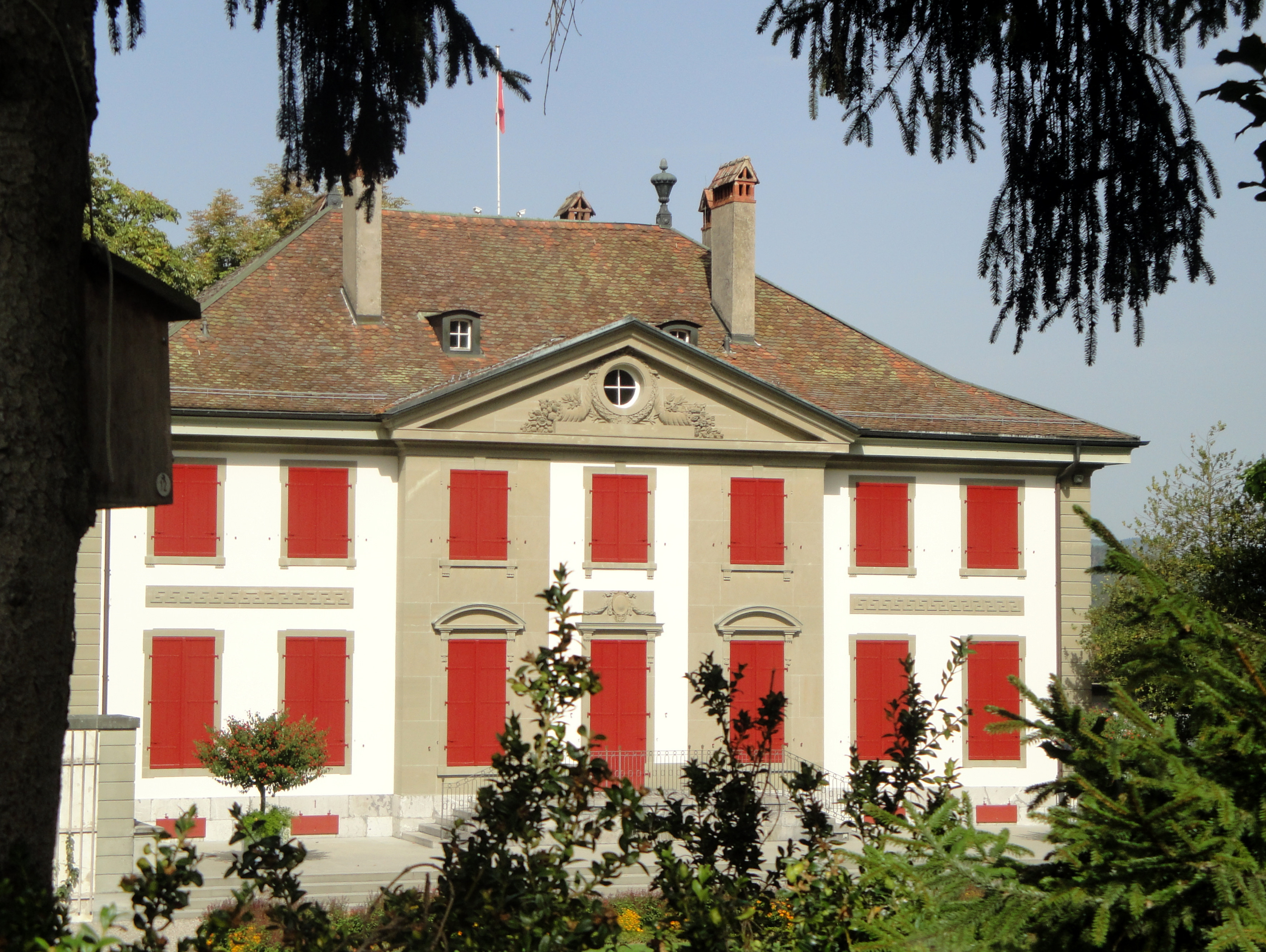
- Lohn Estate photographed in 2011

- Location within Switzerland
- 46°54′31″N 7°28′29″E
- Location: Kehrsatz

History
- Built: 1782
- Built for: Tscharner Family

Site notes
- Architect: Carl Ahasver von Sinner
- Architectural style: Neo-classical
- Governing body: Swiss Federal Government
- Owner: Swiss Confederation

Swiss Cultural Property of National Significance

The Lohn Estate (German: Landsitz Lohn, French: Domaine du Lohn) is a manor and estate located in Kehrsatz, canton of Bern, Switzerland. It serves as the official estate of the Swiss Federal Council. From 1942 to 1994, the Lohn Estate accommodated the official guests of the Swiss Confederation, which have included a number of heads of States and royalty. It is a Swiss heritage site of national significance.

The manor was built in 1782 by the Tscharner family and was designed by the architect Carl Ahasver von Sinner. The estate was acquired in 1897 by the businessman Friedrich Emil Welti. In 1942, it was donated to the Swiss Confederation by Welti's widow in memory of his father, the former Federal councillor Emil Welti. The manor is a two-storey country house designed in the Neo-classical style. It features several reception rooms on the ground floor and five bedrooms on the upper floor, all adorned with paintings from the Welti collection.

== History ==
=== First building ===
The first building on the Lohn Estate was built for the Landvogt Samuel Bondeli in the 17th century. It was a modest summer house with a garden and an avenue of trees. It passed through several owners until it came into the possession of the Tscharners, a Bernese patrician family. In 1740, Samuel Tscharner, then owner of the estate, died, leaving it to his son Abraham.

Abraham had been an officer in the Dutch army. His first wife, whom he met in Holland, died in childbirth three years after their wedding. His second wife bore him two daughters, of which the younger, Henriette Marie Charlotte, inherited the Lohn in 1755. She married the wealthy Beat Emanuel Tscharner in 1775. A few years later, they decided to replace the country house with a construction best suited to accommodating their growing family.

=== Second building ===
In 1782, Tscharner hired the Bernese architect Carl Ahasver von Sinner to design and build the manor for his family. Thereafter, the house remained a property of the Tscharner family, until the death of Henriette von Tscharner in 1897. That same year, her heirs sold the estate to Friedrich Emil Welti, the son of the Federal Council member Emil Welti. He purchased it with the indemnities of his divorce from his first wife Lydia Welti-Escher, who was accused of having cheated on him for over ten years with painter Karl Stauffer. He lived in the manor until his death in 1940. In 1942, Welti's second wife and widow Helene Welti-Kammerer donated the Lohn Estate to the Swiss Confederation, in memory of Emil Welti.

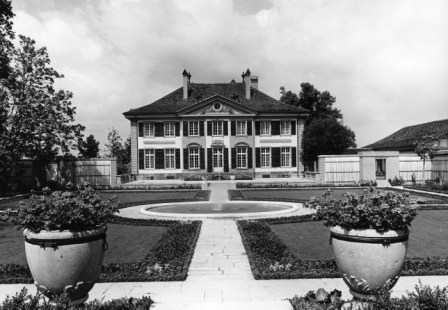
Photograph of the southern façade, taken from the French garden

In accordance with the wishes of Welti-Kammerer, the manor was used to accommodate heads of State and governments, as well as royalty, during their official stays in Switzerland. Former guests of the estate include Winston Churchill, Prime Minister of the United Kingdom (1946), Pandit Nehru, first Prime Minister of India (1949), Konrad Adenauer, first Chancellor of West Germany (1951), Sukarno, first President of Indonesia (1956), Rainier, Prince of Monaco, and Grace of Monaco (1960), Heinrich Lübke, President of West Germany (1961), Elizabeth II and Prince Philip (1980), Karl Carstens, President of West Germany (1982), François Mitterrand, President of France (1983), Richard von Weizsäcker, President of West Germany (1987), and Lech Wałęsa, President of Poland (1994).

The house was restored between 1959 and 1960. Since 1994, the official guests of the Swiss Confederation stay at the Hotel Bellevue Palace in Bern while the Lohn Estate is used for official events and receptions. Federal Councillors Rudolf Gnägi and Willi Ritschard have also held press meetings in the estate.

== Description ==
=== Manor ===
The manor is a two-storey Bernese 'campagne', a type of country house characteristic of the Bernese nobility. It was designed in the Neo-classical style. A special feature of the house is that its two main façades are not on opposite sides of the building but contiguous: one is on its southern side, while the other is on its western side. The western façade is in the Neo-Palladian style and features several pilasters of the Ionic order. Another noteworthy element is that the house is not directed towards the view of the Alps, which was ostensibly neglected by von Sinner, but towards the main road and the Längenberg hills.

The house features an entertainment area on the ground floor and five bedrooms on the upper floor. The main door, located on the western façade, opens onto a large corridor spanning the entire ground floor and opens onto several reception rooms. The corridor widens onto an octagonal hall at the centre of the house, featuring a staircase on one side and a large salon on the other. The corridor ends in the main dining hall, which is installed in an annex.

The staircase leading to the upper floor is hung with large paintings, including a portrait of Helene Welti, the last mistress of the house, by Ferdinand Hodler, and a group portrait of the Welti family. It leads to a hall, identical in layout to the one on the ground floor, which leads to the five bedrooms. The large bedroom, facing the Aare valley, is known as the "Churchill Room" since the English statesman stayed there in 1946.

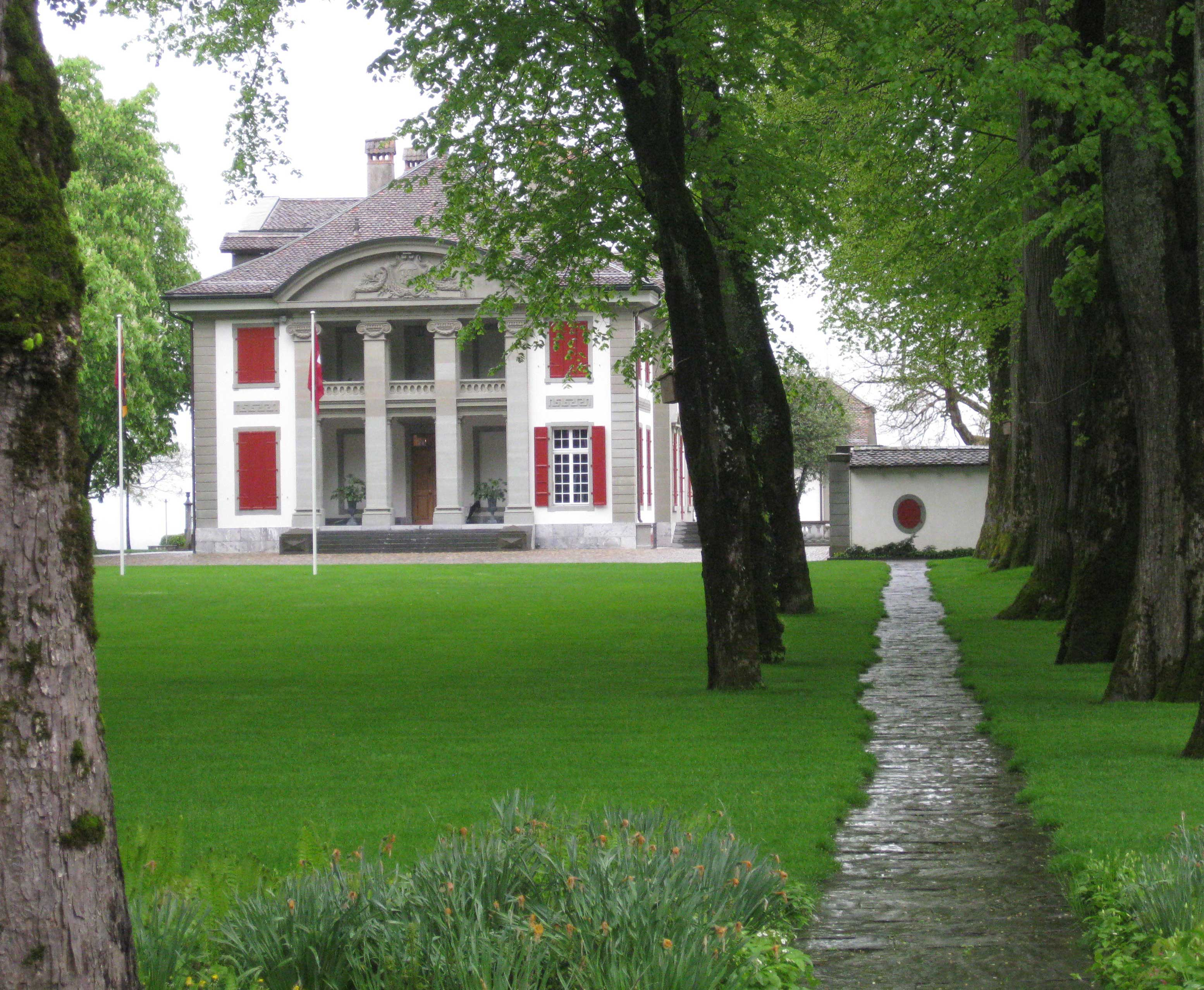
The western façade. On the right, a path lined with lime trees

The manor is finely furnished, mainly with Bernese furniture in the Empire style. According to the art historian Monica Bilfinger, the vast majority of the objects in the manor, including the artwork and furniture, belonged to the Welti-Kammerer family. The rooms are equipped with 18th-century faïence cocklestoves from Peter Gnehm and the Frisching Faience Manufactory. The manor also houses paintings from the extensive Welti collection, including works by Adriaen Brouwer, Ferdinand Hodler, Cuno Amiet, Albert Anker, Alexandre Calame, Marguerite Frey-Surbek and Rudolf Koller.

=== Grounds ===
The estate features a park, a formal French garden, and a terrace. The French garden is in front of the manor's southern façade. The gate of the estate is located at the south-west corner of the grounds. From the gate, two paths lead to the manor: one for motorists, tarred and flanked with chestnut trees, and one for walkers, which runs through an avenue of lime trees. The greenery and flowers are managed by the Federal Landscaping Authority.

== See also ==
- List of castles in Switzerland
- Béatrice-von-Wattenwyl-Haus
- History of Bern
- Emil Welti
