= Friedrich Emil Welti =

Swiss businessman and legal historian

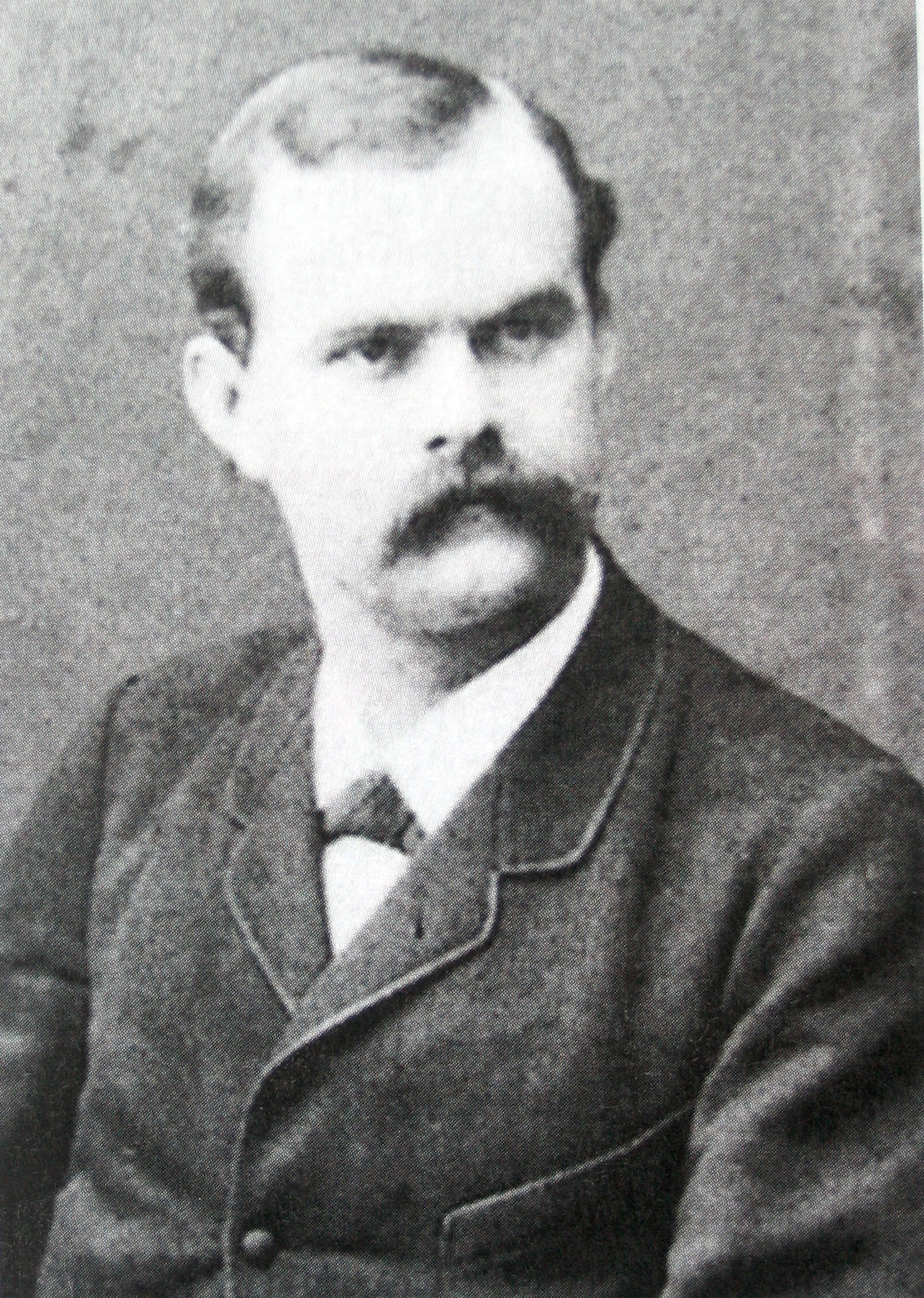
- Welti, c. 1890
- Born: Friedrich Emil Welti; 15 June 1857; Aarau, Switzerland
- Died: 8 March 1940 (aged 82); Lohn Estate, Kehrsatz, Switzerland
- Occupation(s): Historian, businessman
- Spouses: Lydia Escher (m. 1883; div. 1890) Helene Kammerer (m. 1893)
- Father: Emil Welti
- Relatives: Alfred Escher (father-in-law)

Friedrich Emil Welti commonly known as Fritz Welti (15 June 1857 - 8 March 1940) was a Swiss businessman and legal historian; one of the most influential figures in the Swiss insurance industry. His father was the Federal Councilor, Emil Welti and his first wife was Lydia Escher, a major patron of the arts.

== Biography ==
When his father was elected to the Federal Council in 1867, the family moved to Bern. He received his doctorate in law from the University of Bern in 1880 and moved to Winterthur, to work for the Swiss Accident Insurance Institute. He eventually sat on the Board of Directors there and at several other companies; notably the Schweizerische Mobiliar; serving as its President from 1904 to 1937.

Some of this rapid rise in the industry was a result of his 1883 marriage to Lydia Escher, the only daughter of the politician and industrialist, Alfred Escher. One of the artists they patronized was Welti's childhood friend, Karl Stauffer-Bern. Not long after their marriage, Lydia and Stauffer began a secret love affair in Rome. When this was discovered, she and Karl fled, but Welti's father intervened, had Stauffer arrested and Lydia placed in an insane asylum. She was released in 1890, a divorce was granted, and she committed suicide the following year.

In 1893, he married Helene Kammerer (1865-1942), whose father was a doctor. As a result of the divorce proceedings, he had become wealthy and, in 1897, acquired the Lohn Estate, near Kehrsatz, where they lived for the rest of their lives. The marriage remained childless. Possibly out of remorse, he donated large sums to the Gottfried Keller-Stiftung, which had been created by Lydia. He also established an award, the Welti-Preis, for literature by a Swiss author, which was awarded every three years until 2000. His estate became a popular meeting place for creative artists and scientists.

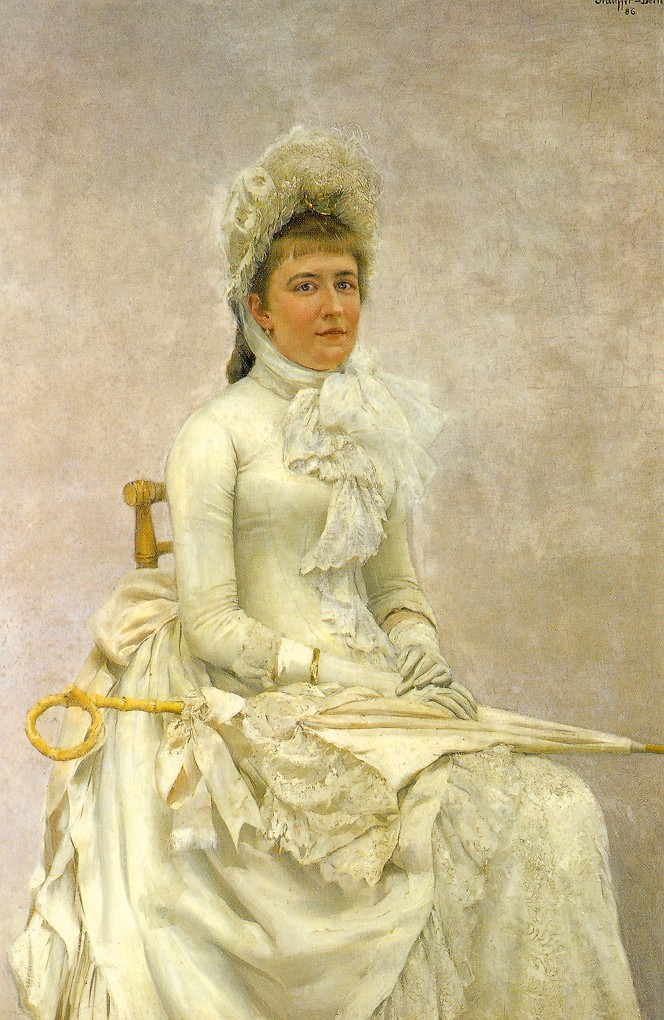
Portrait of Lydia Escher by Karl Stauffer-Bern

As a legal historian, he regularly contributed articles to the Anzeiger für Schweizergeschichte (Annals of Swiss History), as well as histories of Bern, covering the 14th and 15th centuries, along with the tax books from that period. After that, he began a four-decade long collaboration with the historian, Walther Merz, doing research on behalf of the Collection of Swiss Law Sources and studying town privileges. In 1925, he published an annotated version of the travel diary of Hans von Waltheim. His estate documents are kept at the Staatsarchiv Aargau and the Burgerbibliothek of Berne.
