= Champel =

Neighborhood in Geneva, Switzerland

Coordinates: 46°11′20″N 6°9′29″E

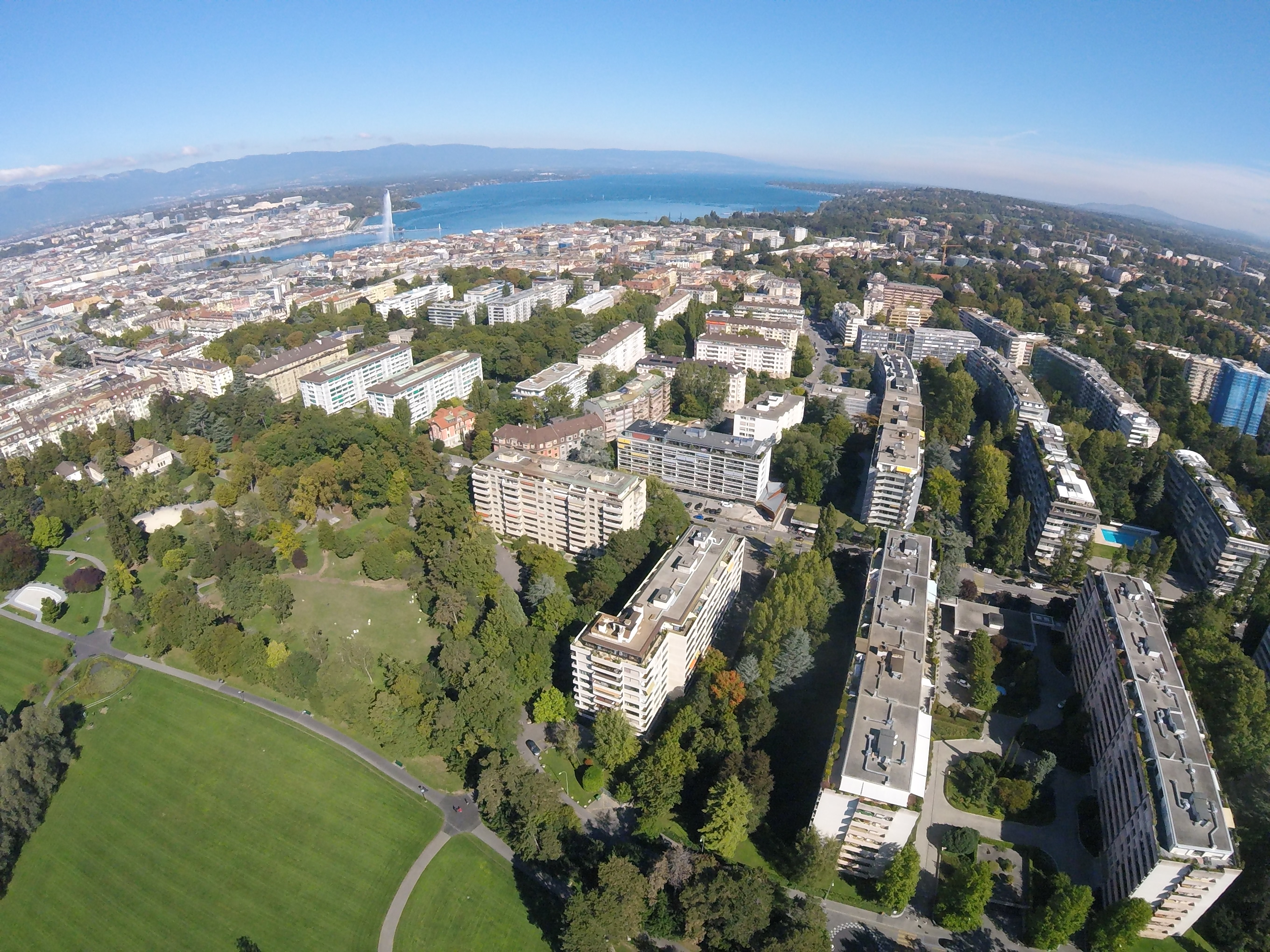
Champel, aerial view

Champel is a neighborhood in the city of Geneva, Switzerland.

Champel is widely considered a posh, high-class neighbourhood due to its numerous parks and natural spaces, very luxurious apartments and proximity to the city center. Residences mostly consist of mid-range to high-scale apartments. Champel is home to Cité Universitaire (French: for university campus), a hostel-like complex for students of the University of Geneva.

== Geography ==
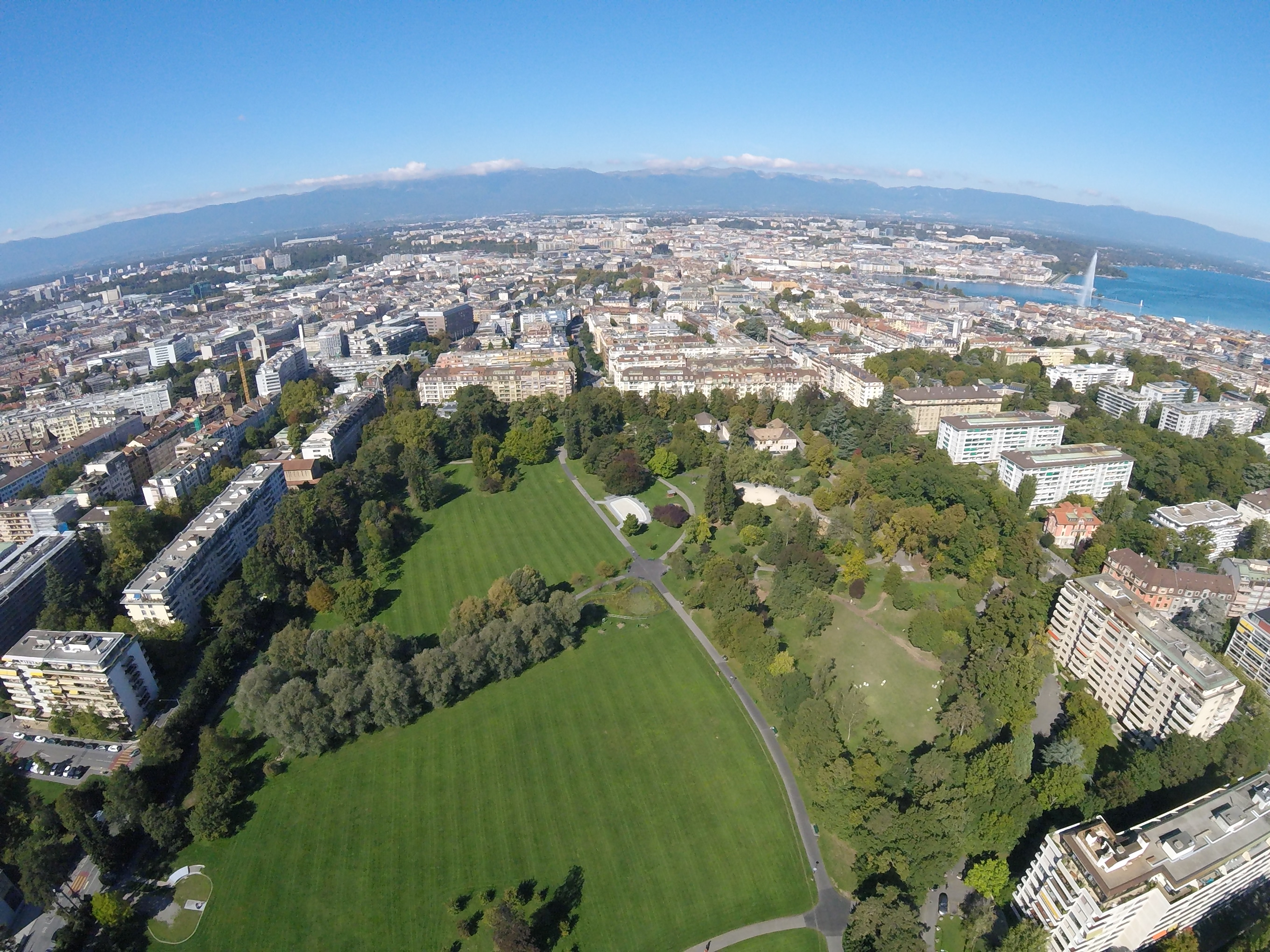
Parc Bertrand

Champel is close to Florissant, bordered by the neighborhood of Eaux-Vives to the north, the municipality of Veyrier to the east, the municipality of Carouge to the south and the city center to the west, occupying an area of approximately 1.9 square kilometres (0.73 sq mi).

=== Sights ===
The 'plateau de Champel' is the center of the neighbourhood. The 'Parc Bertrand' is a popular 11.1-hectare (27.4-acre) park, featuring a former primary school (which is now a day-care center), a fenced dog park, a playground for small children as well as a wading pool. The neo-Gothic 'Tour de Champel' on the edge of the cliffs overlooking the Arve is a scenic view.

== Notable people ==
- Michael Servetus (1509 or 1511 – 1553), Spanish theologian, physician, cartographer, and Renaissance humanist, was executed at the Plateau of Champel
- Lydia Welti-Escher (1858–1891), patron of the arts and founder of the Gottfried Keller Stiftung, committed suicide in her house in Champel
