= Collection of Swiss Law Sources =

Collection of historical legal documents

The Collection of Swiss Law Sources (Sammlung Schweizerischer Rechtsquellen in German; Collection des sources du droit suisse in French; Collana Fonti del diritto svizzero in Italian) is a collection of critical editions of historical legal documents (regarded as sources of law) created on Swiss territory from the early Middle Ages up to 1798.

It is edited by the Law Sources Foundation of the Swiss Lawyers Society. The Law Sources Foundation was established in 1894 (then called Law Sources Commission) for this purpose.

Since then, over 100 volumes (80,000+ pages) of source material (e.g., statutes, decrees, or regulations, but also administrative documents and court transcripts) from the early Middle Ages until early modern times have been published in the form of source editions.

The primary sources are manuscripts written in various regional historical forms of German, French, Italian, Rhaeto-Romance languages, and Latin, which were transcribed (using diplomatic transcription, annotated, and commented by the editors. The apparatuses are in modern German, French, or Italian. The goal of the Collection is to make the sources available to historians of law, law researchers, historians in general, as well as to researchers from other fields and interested laypeople. Most of the older volumes only have a single general index, containing persons, places, and general terms; newer volumes usually have a separate index of persons and places.

The Collection is organized by modern cantons, with further subdivisions by historical areas of jurisdiction, such as towns or bailiwicks.

At the moment, the Collection of Swiss Law Sources covers 22 of the 26 Swiss cantons to different extents. The edition of the Collection is an ongoing project and further volumes are in preparation. The Foundation receives funding from the Swiss National Science Foundation, the Friedrich-Emil-Welti-Fonds, individual cantons, and other sources (e.g., municipalities).

Since 2018, the digitally compiled editions (XML/TEI) have been freely available online in the portal of the Collection of Swiss Law Sources online. On 1 May 2020, the Legal Sources Foundation founded the association e-editiones together with other editing companies in order to jointly develop the publication tool TEI Publisher, among other things.

== Presidents ==
- 1894–1921 Andreas Heusler
- 1921–1935 Walther Merz
- 1935–1960 Hermann Rennefahrt
- 1960–1966 Jacob Wackernagel
- 1966–1988 Hans Herold
- 1988–2006 Claudio Soliva
- 2006–present Lukas Gschwend
