= Hedwig Weiß =

German painter and graphic artist

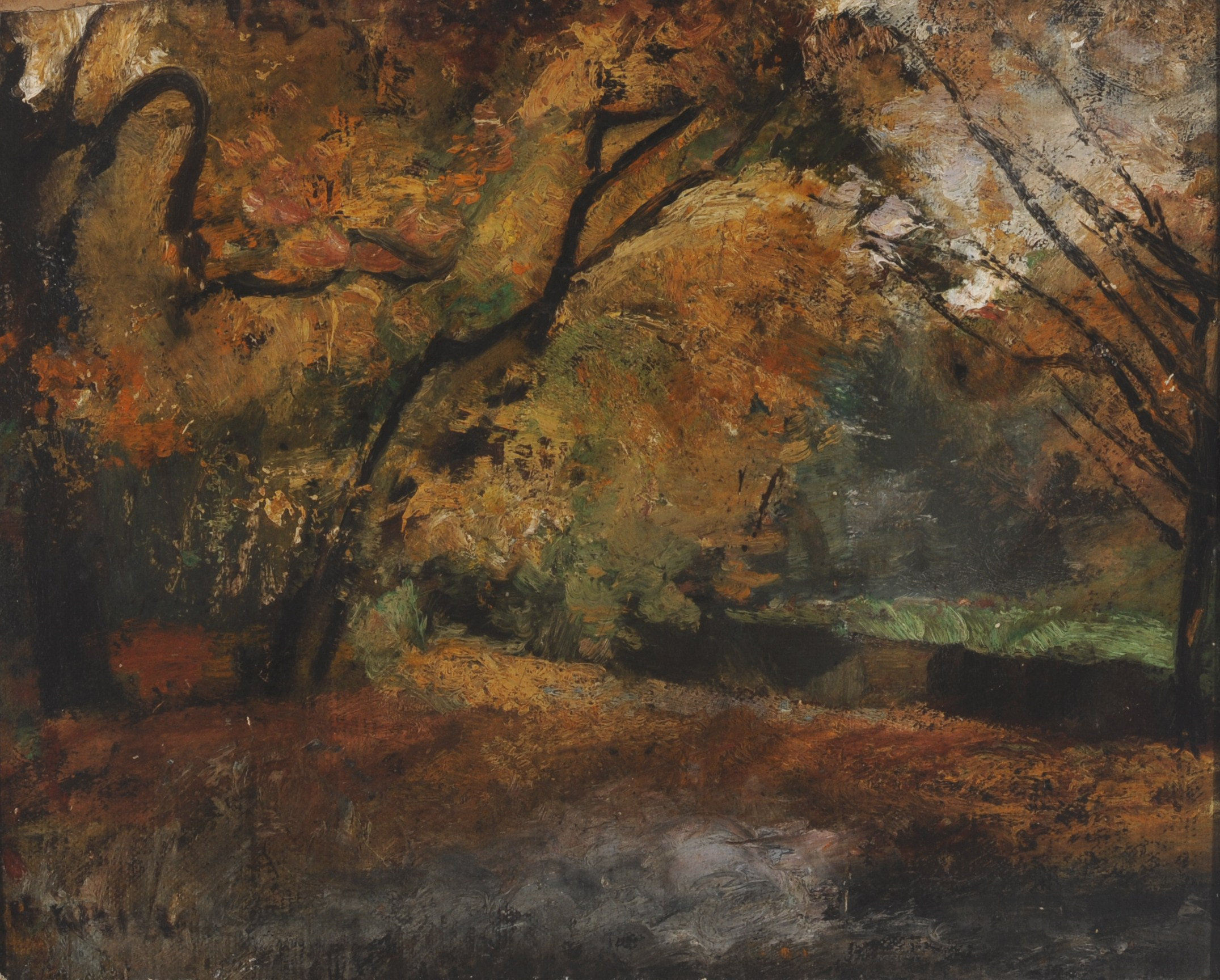
Scene at the Berliner Tiergarten

Hedwig Weiß (25 May 1860, Königsberg - 1923, Berlin) was a German painter and graphic artist. Her works are primarily Impressionistic in style.

== Biography ==
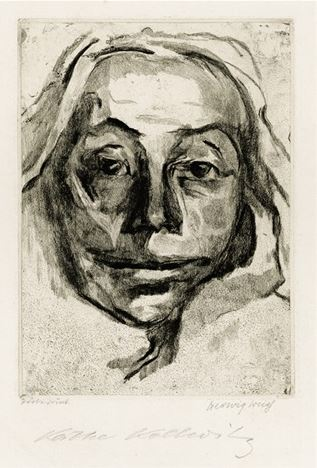
Portrait of Käthe Kollwitz

Her father, Bernhard Weiß, was an Evangelical theologian. Her mother, Hermine (née Von Woyna) was a member of the nobility. They supported her interest in the visual arts as a pastime, but not as a profession. She and her friend, Käthe Kollwitz, received lessons in drawing and engraving from Rudolph Mauer (1845-1905). Later, she attended the Damenakademie in Berlin where she studied with Karl Stauffer-Bern and met her lifelong friend, Maria Slavona. In 1887, she completed her studies in Munich with Ludwig von Herterich, Wilhelm Dürr and Fritz von Uhde, who had a significant influence on her style.

After 1888, she shared a studio in Berlin with Olga Boznańska and became a member of the Verein der Berliner Künstlerinnen. She participated in their exhibitions and eventually joined their governing board. She also presented her works at the second exhibition of the Berlin Secession and had showings fifteen times between 1900 and 1913. A partularly important exhibit was the one held in 1907 at the German Museum of Books and Writing. The reviews she received were mostly positive.

In 1910, she became one of the few women admitted as members of the Berlin secession. She was also accepted into the Deutscher Künstlerbund. During World War I, she provided illustrations for the magazine Kriegszeit

Her father died in 1918, so she lost the financial support he had been providing. This, together with the hyperinflation that followed the war, left her virtually penniless. She became increasingly ill, withdrew from public life, and died on an unknown date in 1923.

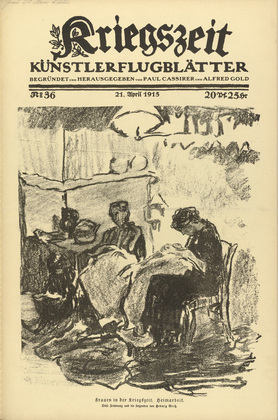
"Women in Wartime"

She was soon forgotten and much of her work has been lost. A research project at the University of Kiel is attempting to trace her paintings and reassemble as many as possible.
