= Karl Stauffer-Bern =

Swiss painter, etcher and sculptor

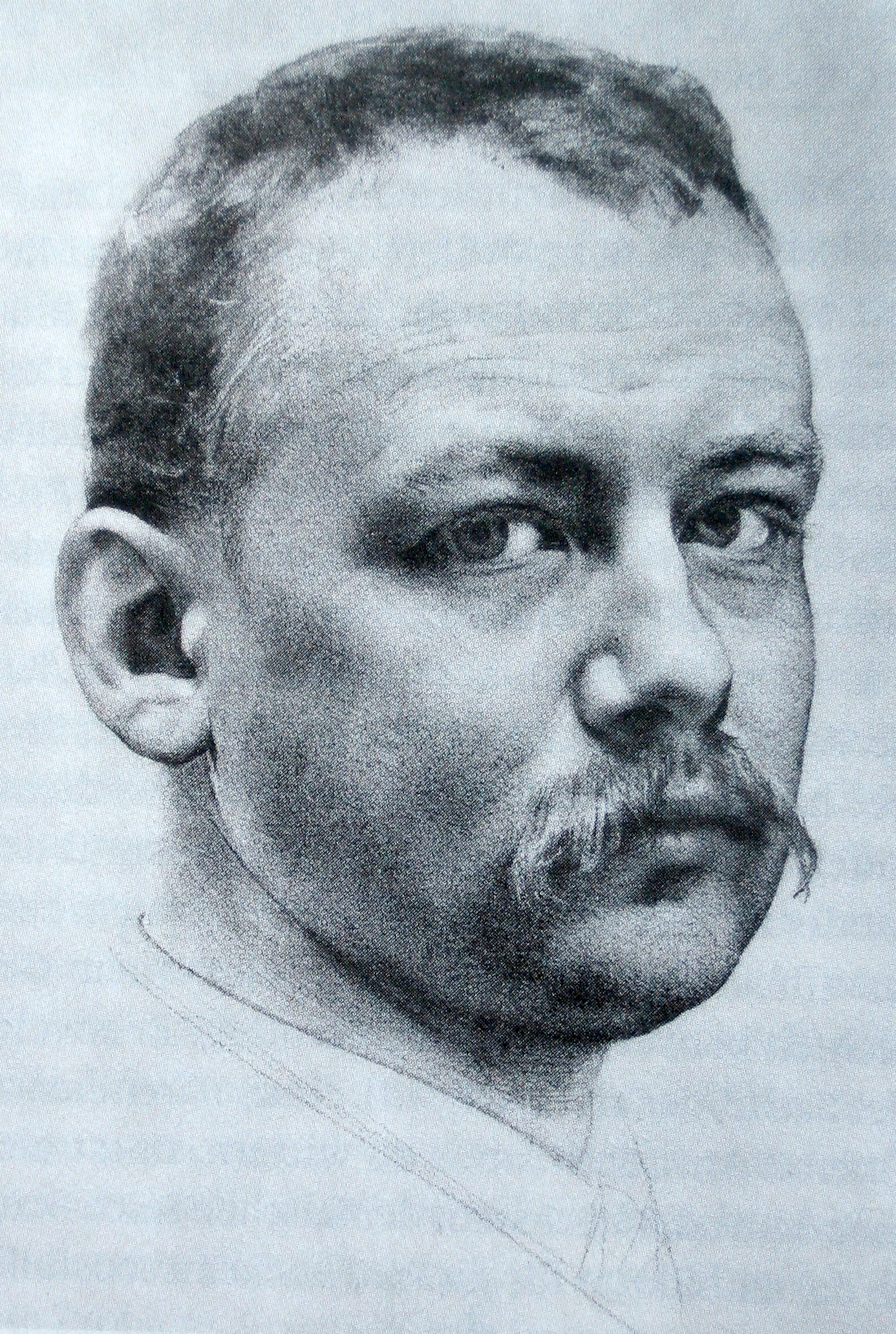
Self-portrait (date unknown)

Karl Stauffer, known as Karl Stauffer-Bern (2 September 1857, Trubschachen – 24 January 1891, Florence) was a Swiss painter, etcher and sculptor. In the late 1880s, Stauffer-Bern had a romantic affair with Lydia Welti-Escher, but her husband used his political influence to separate them and to place Welti-Escher in an insane asylum. A despondent Stauffer-Bern reacted with a suicide attempt which left him permanently injured. In January 1891, he committed suicide with an overdose of chloral hydrate.

== Life ==
His father was a curate and pastor in Bern. He studied at the Academy of Fine Arts, Munich under Feodor Dietz and Ludwig von Löfftz. Later, he worked in Berlin as a portrait painter, where he had many notable people as subjects. Then, he studied etching and engraving with Peter Halm. He was also a teacher at the Berlin School for Women Artists, where his students included Käthe Kollwitz, Hedwig Weiß and Clara Siewert.

In 1888, under the sponsorship of his patrons, the Welti family, he went to Rome to study sculpture. While there, he began an affair with Lydia Welti-Escher, daughter of Alfred Escher (railway magnate and co-founder of Credit Suisse) and wife of Friedrich Emil Welti, whose father was Emil Welti (a powerful government minister). The affair turned to love and a divorce from Welti was proposed, but he contacted the Swiss Embassy in Rome and used his considerable influence to separate them. Lydia was placed in an insane asylum and Karl was jailed after being charged with kidnapping and rape. In May 1890, a full psychiatric report showed no sign of mental illness and she was released. His release followed in June, due to lack of evidence. She was returned to her husband, although she soon filed for a divorce, which was eventually granted.

In a state of despondency over the loss of his love, he suffered a nervous breakdown and spent some time in the San Bonifazio mental hospital. After his release, he attempted suicide by gun. The shot barely missed his heart and left him permanently injured. In January 1891, unable to work and apparently suffering from persecution mania, he committed suicide with an overdose of chloral hydrate. Lydia's suicide by gas followed that December.

The tone poem An Alpine Symphony by Richard Strauss (1915), was originally conceived as a musical portrait of Stauffer-Bern, although Strauss later denied that there were any direct biographical references.

== Selected portraits ==
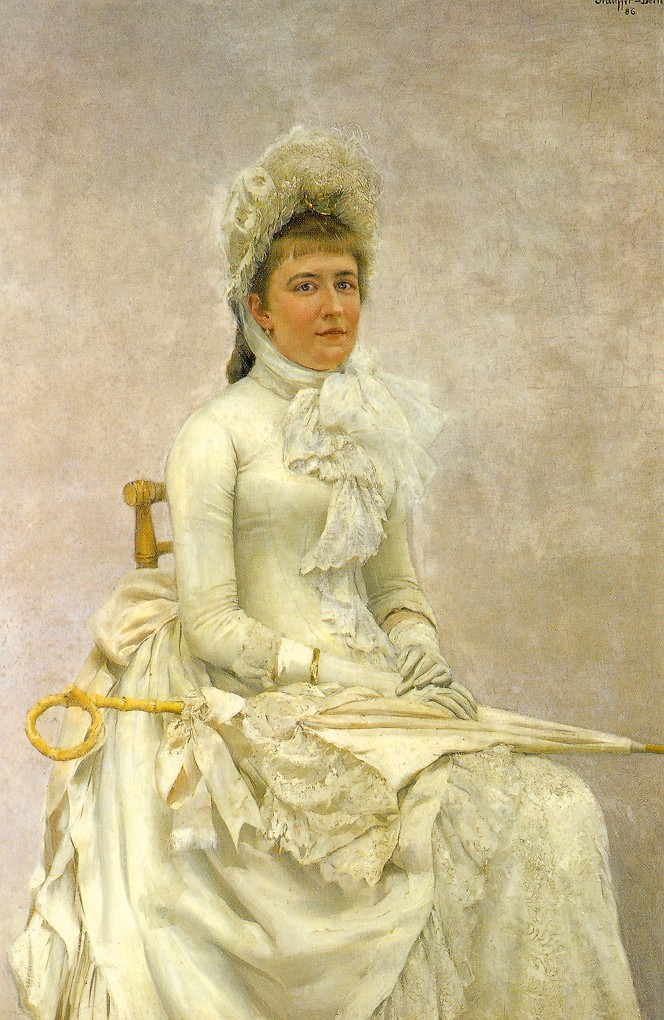
Lydia Welti-Escher
(date unknown)

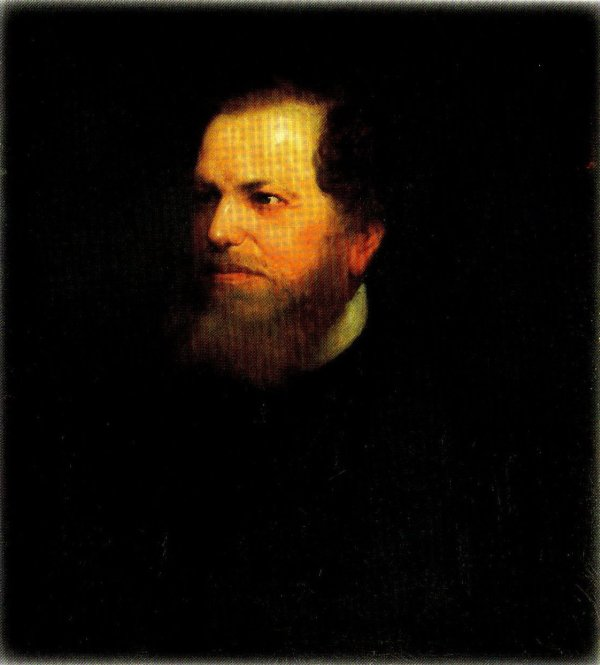
Simon Sinas (1874)

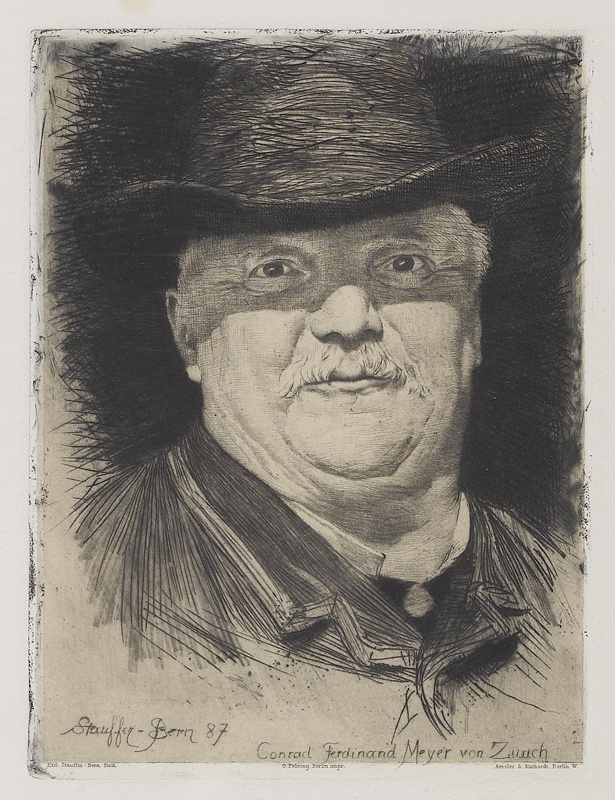
Conrad Ferdinand Meyer (1887)

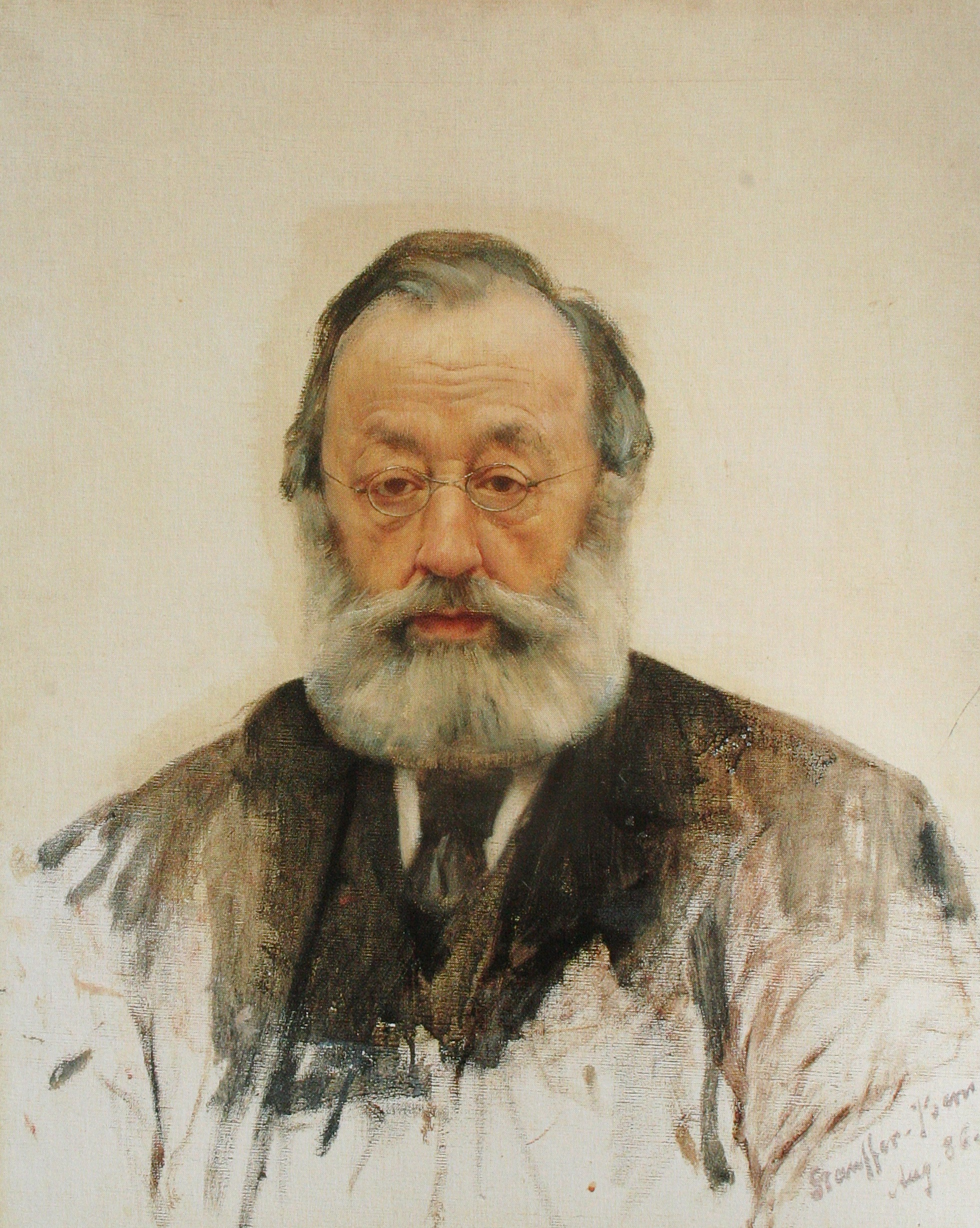
Gottfried Keller (1886)

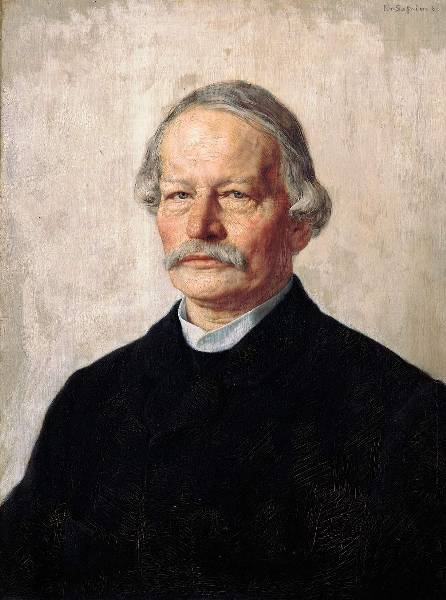
Gustav Freytag (1887)

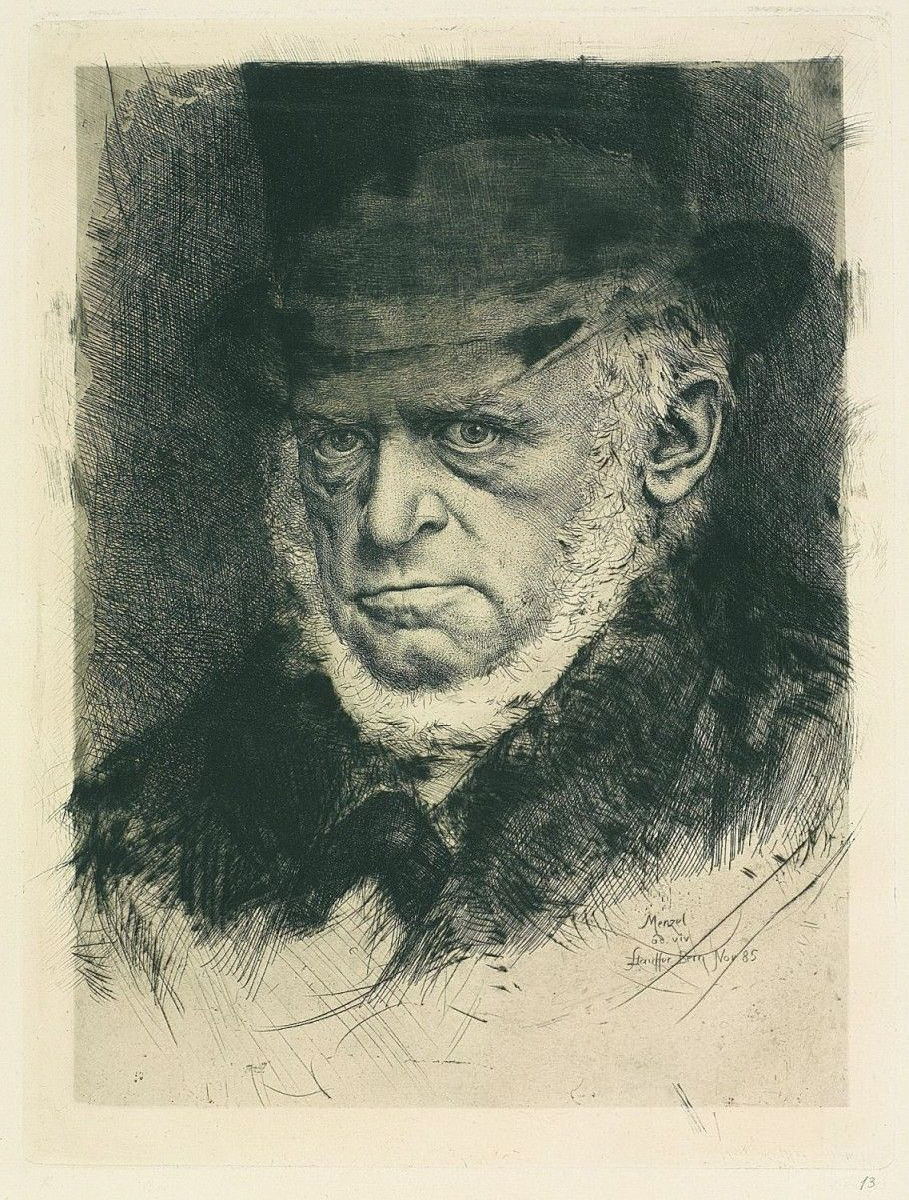
Adolph von Menzel (1885)
