= Gottfried Keller Foundation =

Arts foundation in Winterthur, Switzerland

Coordinates: 47.5113°N 8.7317°E

Gottfried Keller-Stiftung
- Founded: 1890
- Founder: Lydia Welti-Escher
- Purpose: arts and cultural heritage of Switzerland
- Location: Winterthur
- Origins: legacy of Lydia Welti-Escher
- Region served: Switzerland
- Owner: Switzerland, administrated by the federal Bundesamt für Kultur (BAK)
- Key people: Lydia Welti-Escher
- Website: Bundesmuseen: Gottfried Keller-Stiftung (BSK) (in German and French)

Gottfried Keller-Stiftung (Gottfried Keller Foundation, French: la fondation Gottfried-Keller), commonly abbreviated to GKS, is an arts foundation focused on cultural heritage of Switzerland. It was named by its founder Lydia Welti-Escher (1858–1891) after the Swiss national poet Gottfried Keller (1819–1891).

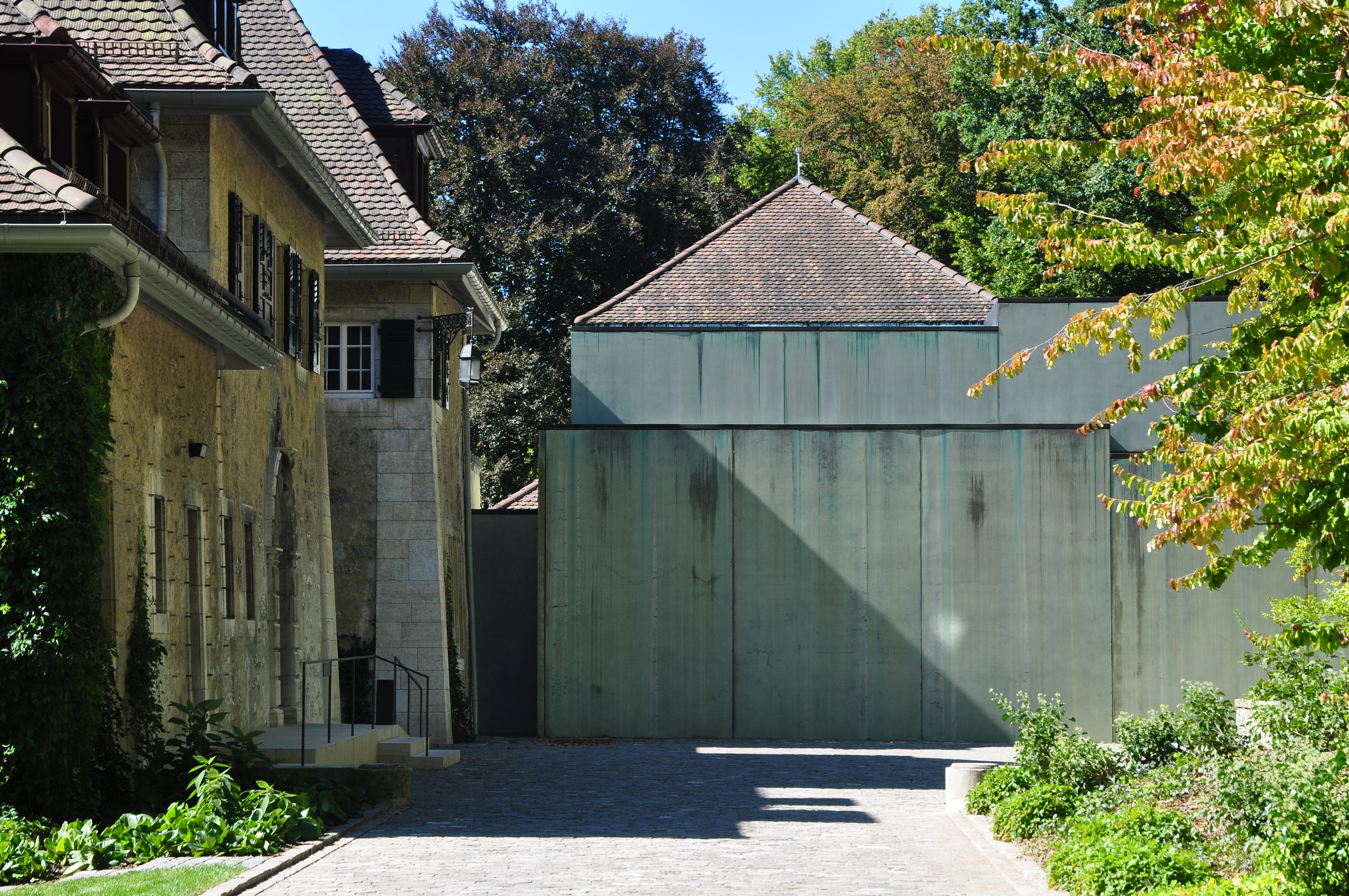
Am Römerholz building in Winterthur

== History ==
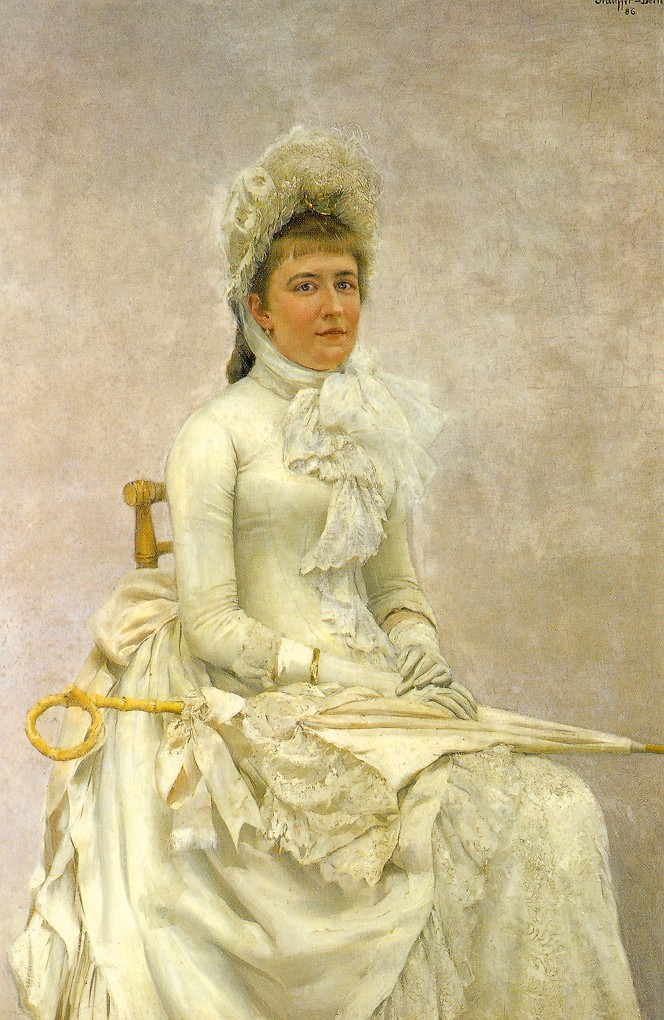
Portrait of Lydia Escher by Karl Stauffer-Bern, Kunsthaus Zürich

In a letter dated 6 September 1890, shortly before the end of her tragic life, Lydia Escher (1858–1891) offered to the federal government a generous donation. The entire Federal Council declared on 16 September 1890 the adoption of the gift. The donation consisted of securities (including shares: 63.5 per cent, bonds: 24.9%, remaining: 11.6%) and land including the Villa Belvoir, which had a total value of 3.46 million Swiss francs at the end of 1890. The donation is managed as a special funds of the Swiss Federation since 1890 under the name Gottfried Keller-Stiftung (GKS) by the Federal Department of Finance, and the income of the donation has to be used for the purchase of important works of visual art of Switzerland, to ensure that important works of Swiss art not moving out of the country and remain open to the public.

The Welti-Escher-Stiftung (Welti-Escher Foundation) was officially named Gottfried Keller-Stiftung (GKS) after Gottfried Keller, to whom her father gave consistent support. According to the will of Lydia Escher, the foundation was managed by the Swiss Federal Council, thus, Lydia Escher wished to accomplish a "patriotic work". The foundation should also promote the "independent work of women, at least in the field of applied arts", according to the original intention of the founder. This purpose was adopted – but at the urging of Welti not in the deed of the foundation. The Gottfried Keller Foundation became though an important collection institution for art, but the feminist concerns of Lydia Escher were not met.

== Organization ==
The five members of the foundation are nominated by the Swiss Federal Council every four years. The Foundation Commission (Stiftungskommission) decides on the acquisition of works of art. Either, the foundation pays for a work of art the full purchase price and places it in a museum of its choice, or it is involved in Museum purchases. Nevertheless, the artwork remains the property of the Swiss Confederation.

== Objects and locations ==
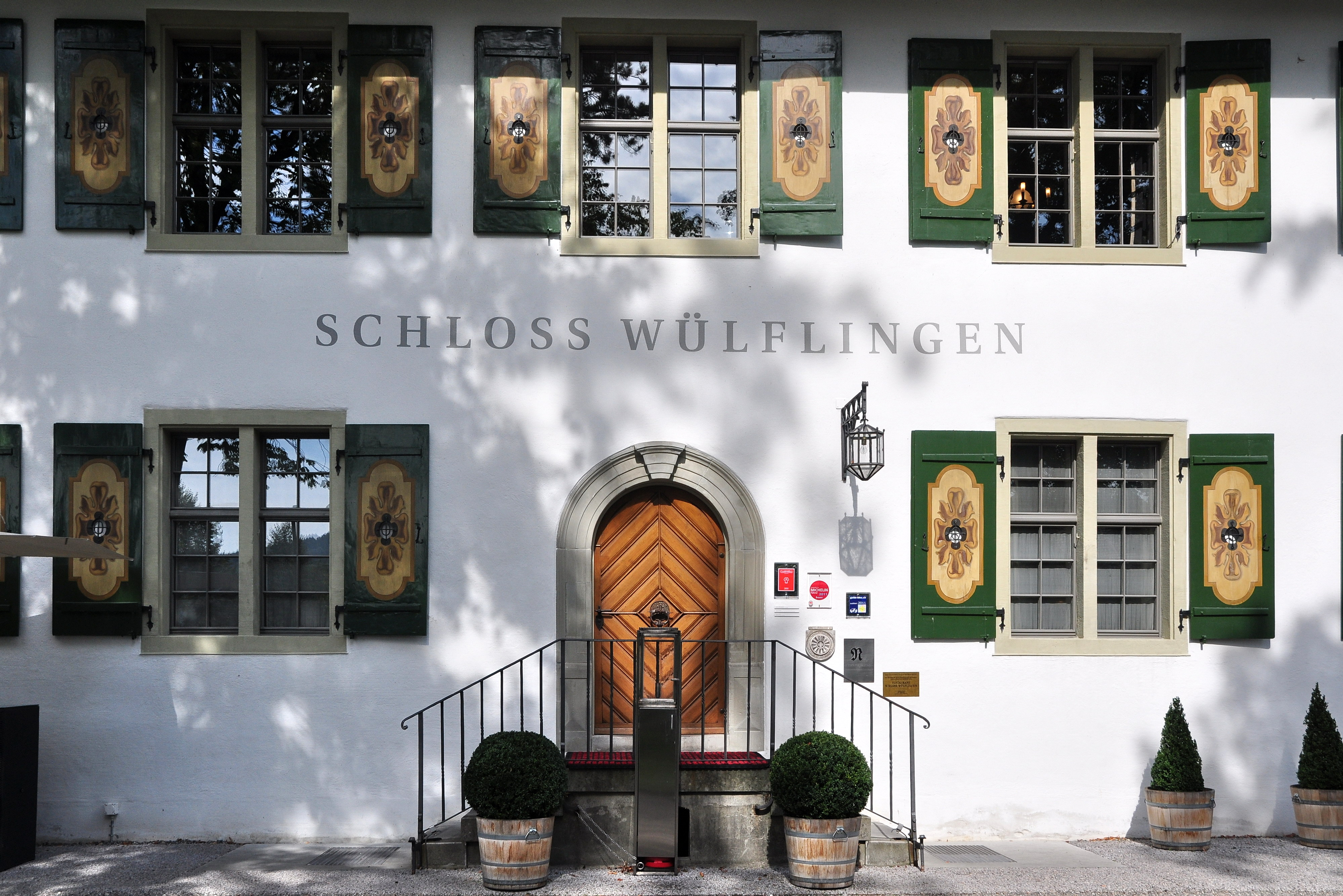
Schloss Wülflingen in Winterthur

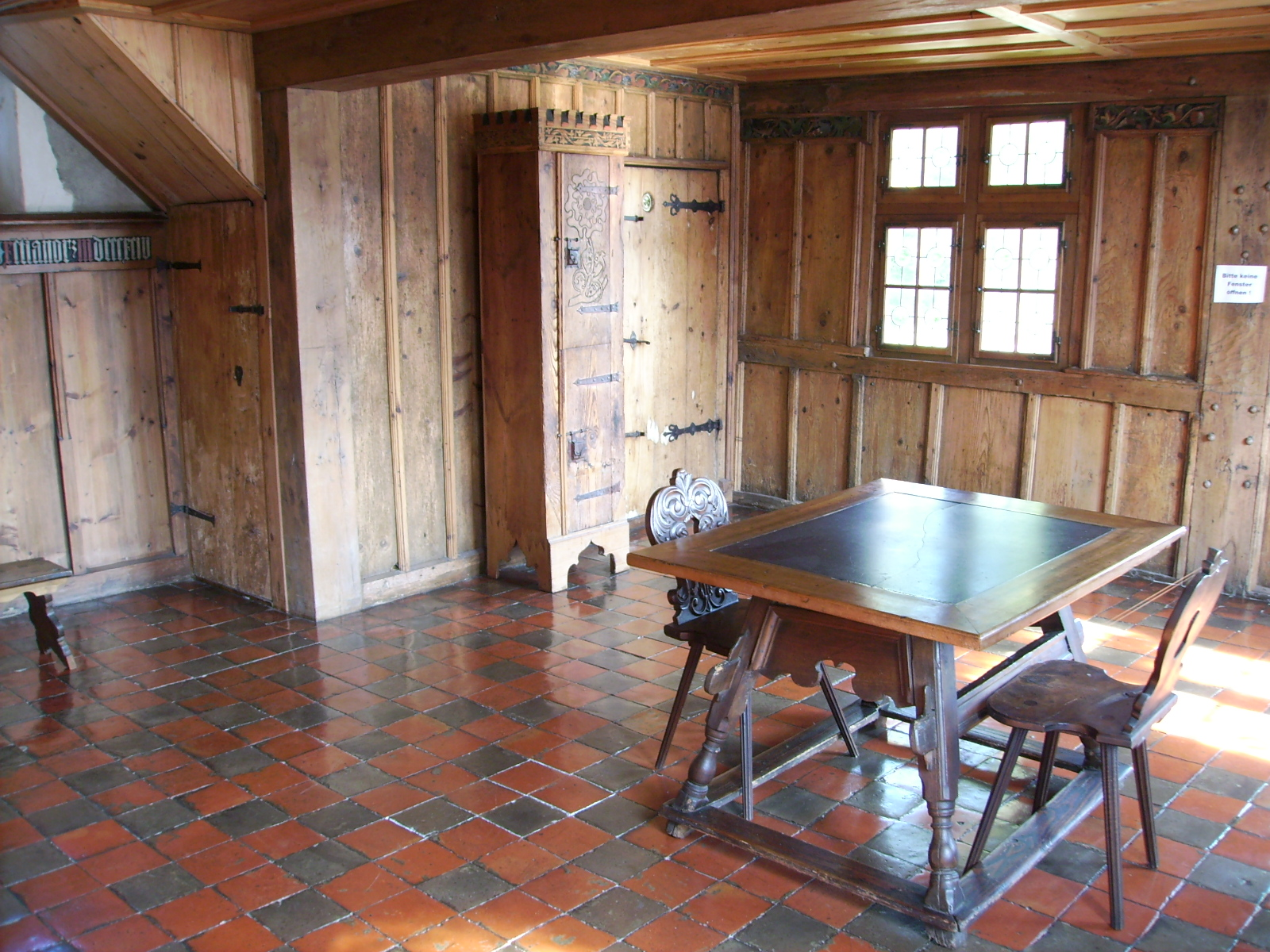
St. Georgen Abbey

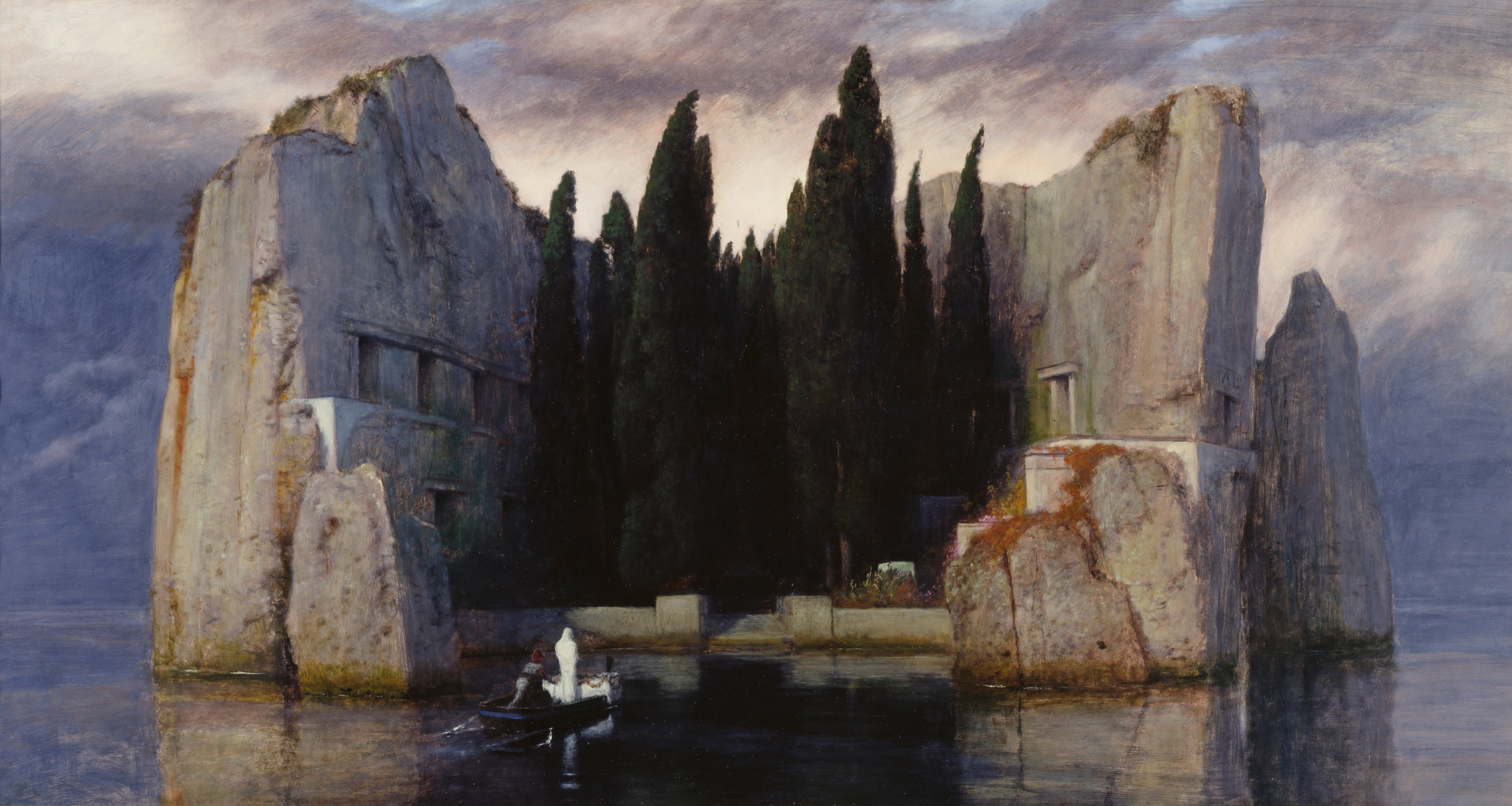
Toteninsel by Arnold Böcklin, acquired in 1920

The foundation aims the acquisition of major works of art from Switzerland and abroad, to entrust them as loans to Swiss museums or to return them to their original locations, such as the choir of the St. Urban's Abbey. Among other, the foundation acquired the St. Georgen Abbey in Stein am Rhein in 1926, and since 1960 it also owns the panorama wall painting of the city of Thun. The purchases of valuable interiors, including Schloss Wülflingen in Winterthur, Maison Supersaxo in Sion and Freuler Palast in Näfels, preserved those Heritage objects at their previous environments. The collection comprises more than 8,500 paintings, sculptures and other art objects in around 110 museums respectively locations in Switzerland.

The market value of the collection can only be approximately quantified: according to the experts the market value ranges between 500 and 1,500 million Swiss Francs in 2009. The applied federal government financial assets of the GKS was about 4.5 million Swiss Francs at the end of 2007.

== Notable acquisitions from outside of Switzerland ==
From the Gröditzberg in Silesia, six of the former stained glass windows of the Augustinerkloster Zürich – that remains were broken following the Reformation in Zürich, excluded the present Augustinerkirche – were bought by the Gottfried Keller Stiftung in 1894. The art dealer Martin Usteri acquired 32 glass panes in 1796, which were sold from his legacy in 1829, and thereafter installed in the today's Grodziec castle. GKS entrusted the six windows to the Swiss National Museum on deposit.

== Mismanagement after the death of Lydia Escher ==
The foundation's assets has diminished in the course of the 20th century, so that it fulfilled its purpose only with additional federal funding. In fact, the foundation's financial problems, as well as the cause to fulfill its purpose according to Lydia Escher's will, occurred also due to mismanagement. So over the years substantial parts of the foundation's assets were destroyed by an unfortunate investment strategy, as well as some of the foundation's former buildings were sold under their market price, among them the locations in Winterthur.

These facts were asked by a parliamentary interpellation in 2008 to the Swiss government and answered on 11 December 2009 by the Swiss Federal Council (Bundesrat): The allegations with reference to the Swiss historian Josef Jung may differentiatedly to judge. The Federal Department of Finance had originally fairly high equity allocation, which amounted in 1890 to 63.5% of the securities and, in particular a large stake in Credit Suisse, until 1903 dismantled in favor of bonds to 3.8%. In 1922 the remaining shares were also sold. Whether the sale of all shares was a too conservative investment strategy, is difficult to judge in hindsight; those responsible could foresee neither the 1929 global economic crisis still very good economic development in the 20th century. Placing the mentioned current value of the art collection of the original donation of the 3.46 million Swiss Francs, represents an annual growth rate of the nominal value between 4.3% and 5.3% (based on compound interest calculation). In fact, the long-term security in the real value of the endowment would necessarily implies a growth of capital in the amount of inflation. In retrospect it was very short-sighted to use the annual income of the fund usually in full for the purchase of works of art. In addition, the purchase of the St. Georgen Abbey, proved by the GKS in 1926, is a heavy financial burden due to the high operating costs.

In 2009, the currently available capital amounted to 4.5 million Swiss Francs, did not allow to fulfill the will of Lydia Escher. The ordinary annual income of GKS is currently around 215,000 Swiss Francs (interest income on capital and rental income) and covers just the personnel costs of GKS (90 full-time positions; Monastery Museum St. Georgen: 140 full-time positions). Extraordinary income achieved the GKS only exceptionally. New acquisitions occur only sporadically and with very limited resources given by the current financial situation. Thus, the foundation's purpose in the future, requires a financial leeway. The Federal Office of Culture examined ways to expand this maneuver along with the Federal Finance Administration on 1 January 2009. In the center of the considerations ware revenue-side measures to expand the capital base, new opportunities for wealth management as well as a review of the administrative tasks of GKS. In November 2011 the Federal Government relieved the foundation by bearing all costs of the management of the collection, as well as the foundation's secretariat.

== Cultural heritage of national importance ==
The foundation, today based in Winterthur, is listed in the Swiss inventory of cultural property of national and regional significance as a Class A object of national importance and named Eidgenössische Gottfried Keller-Stiftung, Haldenstrasse 95.

== Literature ==
- Joseph Jung: Lydia Welti-Escher (1858–1891). Biographie. Quellen, Materialien und Beiträge. NZZ Libro, Zürich 2009, ISBN 978-3-03823-557-6.
- Hanspeter Landolt: Gottfried Keller-Stiftung. Sammeln für die Schweizer Museen. 1890–1990. 100 Jahre Gottfried Keller-Stiftung. Benteli, Bern 1990, ISBN 978-3716506967.
