= Lydia Welti-Escher =

Swiss patron of the arts

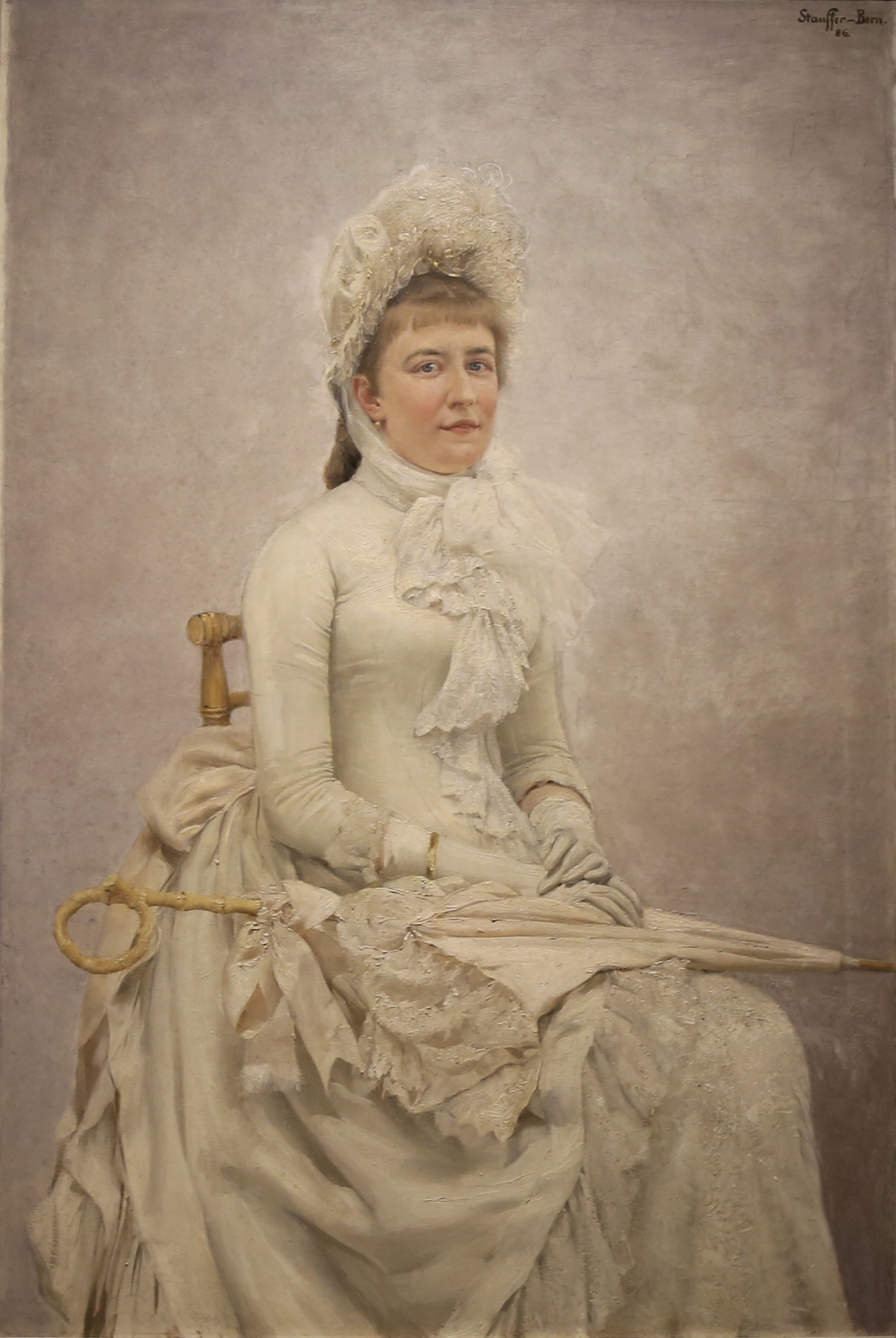
- Portrait by Karl Stauffer-Bern
- Born: Lydia Escher; 10 July 1858; Zürich-Enge
- Died: 12 December 1891 (aged 33); Genève-Champel
- Other name: Lydia Escher
- Years active: 1874–1891
- Known for: Arts patronage
- Notable work: Gottfried Keller Foundation
- Spouse: Friedrich Emil Welti
- Partner: Karl Stauffer-Bern

Lydia Welti-Escher (10 July 1858 – 12 December 1891) was a Swiss patron of the arts. The only surviving child of businessman and politician Alfred Escher, she was one of the richest women in Switzerland at the time and established the Gottfried Keller Foundation.

She married Friedrich Emil Welti but had an affair with the artist Karl Stauffer-Bern; both she and Stauffer eventually died by suicide.

== Early life and family ==
Lydia Escher was born in 1858 in what is now the Zürich district of Enge into the Escher vom Glas family, an old and influential Zürich family. She was the only surviving child of Augusta Escher-Uebel and Alfred Escher (1819–1882), a politician whose many business interests included being one of the founders of the Gotthardbahn. Her younger sister Hedwig died in infancy in 1862. Lydia Welti Escher's death brought an end to Alfred Escher's family line.

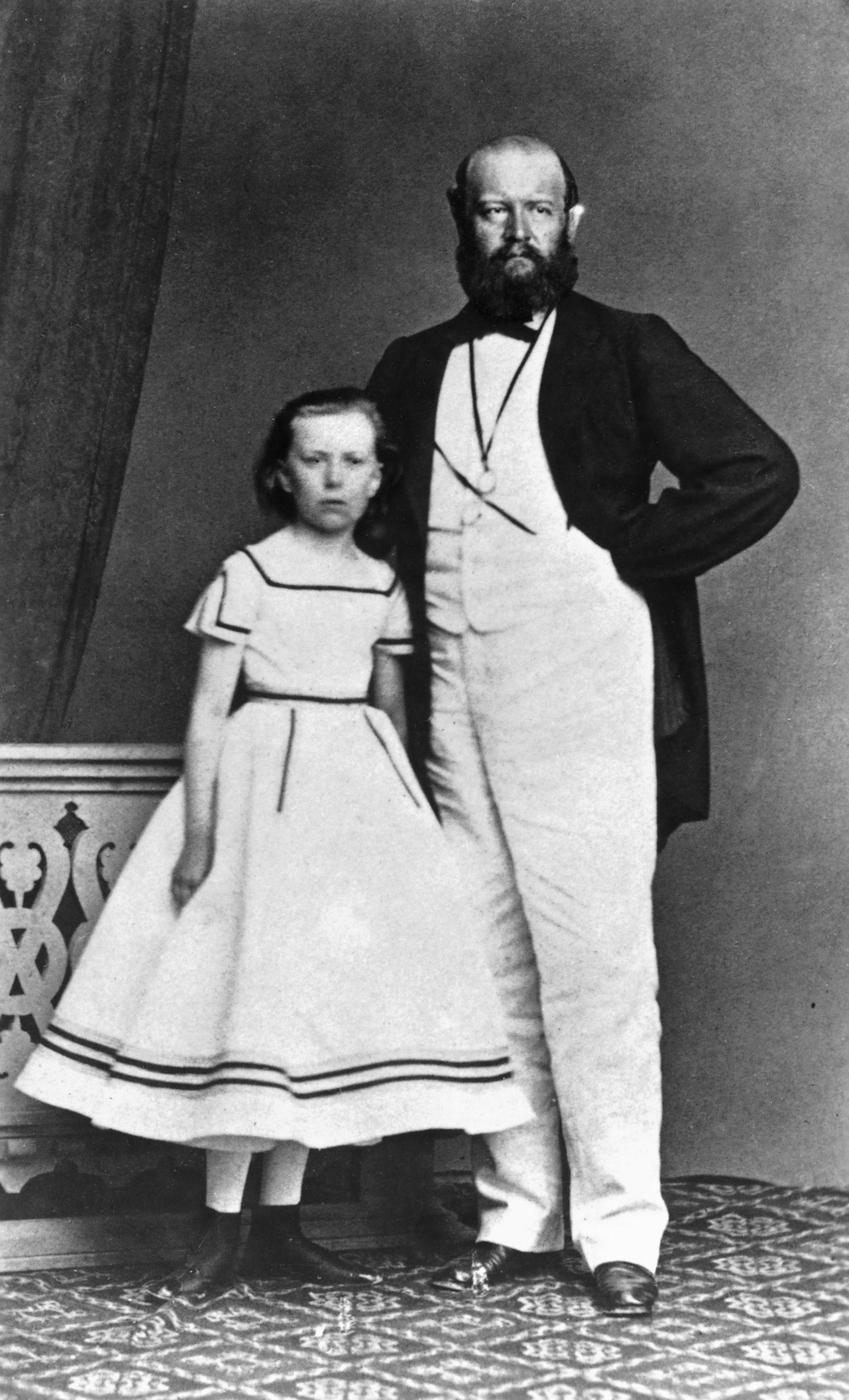
Lydia and her father Alfred Escher, around 1865

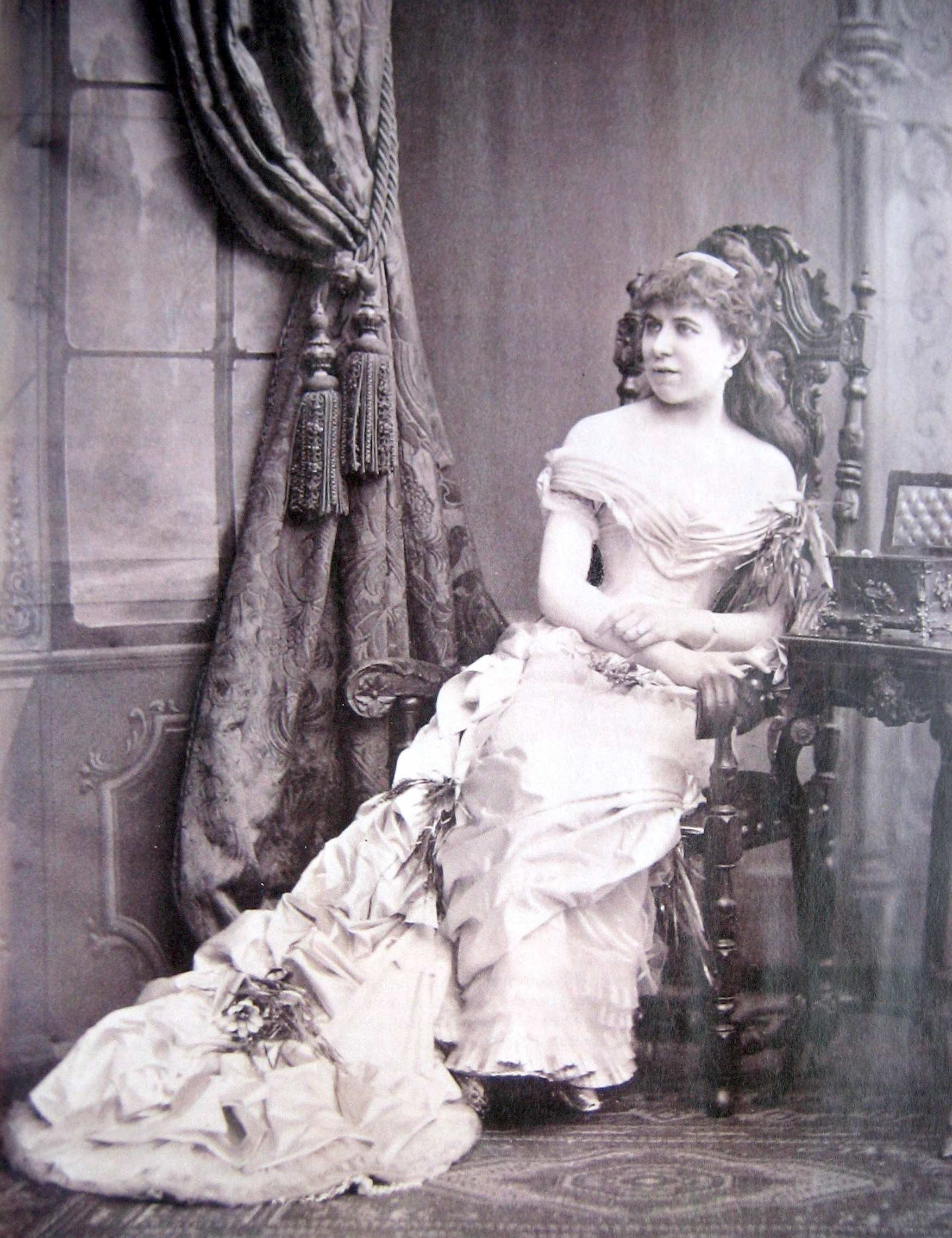
Lydia, probably around 1875

She was raised in Villa Belvoir, the country house built by her grandfather Heinrich Escher in the then village of Enge on the left shore of Lake Zurich. Her mother died in 1864, two years after her sister; Alfred Escher spent as much time as possible with his remaining daughter, rented an apartment near his workplace for her and her governess, and as she grew older, she assisted him in his work, accompanying him on his travels, conducting his correspondence and acting as his closest confidante. She also came to run the household at Belvoir and to act as hostess to her father's numerous guests, among them the poet Gottfried Keller who became a fatherly friend to her. She read extensively, mastered several languages, and liked to attend music and theatre performances. Her letters to her childhood friend, the painter Louise Breslau, speak of her taking singing and piano lessons, and show a fascination with creative genius.

Alfred Escher faced personal attacks from political opponents and also lifelong health problems that repeatedly obliged him to spend long periods in convalescence. During the critical phase of construction of the Gotthard Rail Tunnel in the mid-1870s, he nearly worked himself to death. In 1878 he fell so badly ill that he was unable to leave Belvoir for weeks. In late November 1882, in the course of fulfilling his political and business obligations, he once more fell badly ill, and on 6 December 1882 he died at Belvoir.

== Marriage ==
Lydia Welti became engaged to Friedrich Emil Welti, but Alfred Escher opposed their marrying because Welti's father, Swiss Federal Councillor Emil Welti, once his protege, had become a political opponent. Since the engagement had already been published, they were married after his death, on 4 January 1883. The marriage into the Escher vom Glas family improved Friedrich Emil Welti's standing in Swiss business, and he was named to several boards of directors. Lydia Welti-Escher, however, found her new household comparatively boring.

In August 1885, she made the acquaintance through her husband of the painter Karl Stauffer-Bern. He became a frequent guest at Belvoir and the couple assisted him financially and provided him with a studio on the estate, where he painted portraits of both Lydia Welti-Escher and Gottfried Keller. In October 1889 the Weltis moved to Florence, but shortly after, Friedrich Emil Welti returned to Switzerland on business, leaving his wife in the care of Stauffer.

== Affair ==
She and Stauffer fell in love, and she planned to divorce Welti and marry Stauffer. Their affair became public, and they left Florence and went to Rome. Emil Welti contacted the Swiss Embassy in Rome and used his influence to separate them. Lydia was placed in the public hospital for the insane in Rome, and Stauffer-Bern was jailed after being charged with kidnapping and rape. While in the asylum, Lydia wrote a feminist tract, Gedanken einer Frau ('Thoughts of a Woman'); it was never published and has been lost, probably destroyed along with the majority of her correspondence. Much of the Welti family archives remains inaccessible.

Depressed from her loss, Karl Stauffer-Bern suffered a nervous breakdown, spent some time in a mental hospital, and after his release, attempted suicide by gun. In January 1891, unable to work and apparently suffering from paranoia, he overdosed on chloral hydrate.

== Stigmatization and endowment of the Gottfried Keller Foundation ==
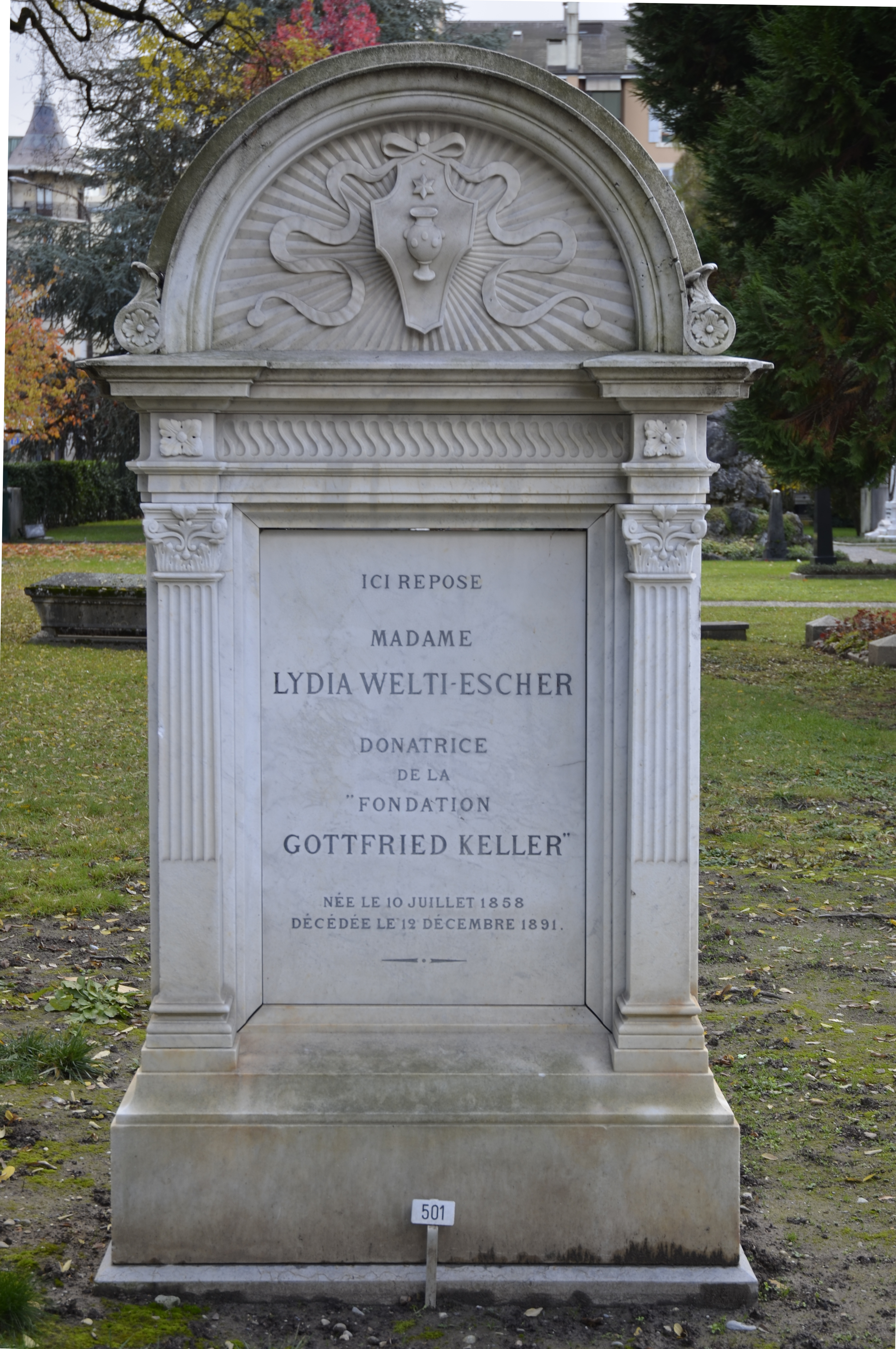
Tombstone of Lydia Welti-Escher, Cimetière des Rois, Geneva

In May 1890, a psychiatric report showed no sign of the claimed systematic madness (and from a 21st-century perspective indicated that she was mentally healthy), and Lydia Welti-Escher was released. Her husband took her back to Switzerland, where he demanded a divorce and exacted 1.2 million Swiss Francs in compensation. One of her biographers, Josef Jung, wrote that after returning to Switzerland, Welti-Escher stayed for a time at the clinic of Königsfelden, but another biographer, Willi Wottreng, said there were no sources for this time in a second institution, which would indicate she had successfully emancipated herself by defying the will of her husband and her father-in-law.

Ostracized as an adulteress by the 'high society' of Zürich, in summer 1890 she moved into a house in Genève-Champel. Here she invested her family fortune in a foundation to support the arts, which was named the Gottfried Keller Foundation for her old friend Gottfried Keller. She endowed it with her remaining assets, Villa Belvoir and marketable securities with a nominal total value of 4 million Swiss Francs. According to her will, the foundation was established on 6 June 1890, and was to be managed by the Swiss Federal Council. She wrote in a letter that she intended the foundation to specifically promote "the independence of the female sex, at least in the field of the applied arts", but her ex-husband prevented the inclusion of this objective in the founding document, and it was relegated to an accompanying note.

== Death and legacy ==
Having achieved this objective, on 12 December 1891 she ended her life using the household gas supply. She is buried in the Cimetière des Rois in Geneva.

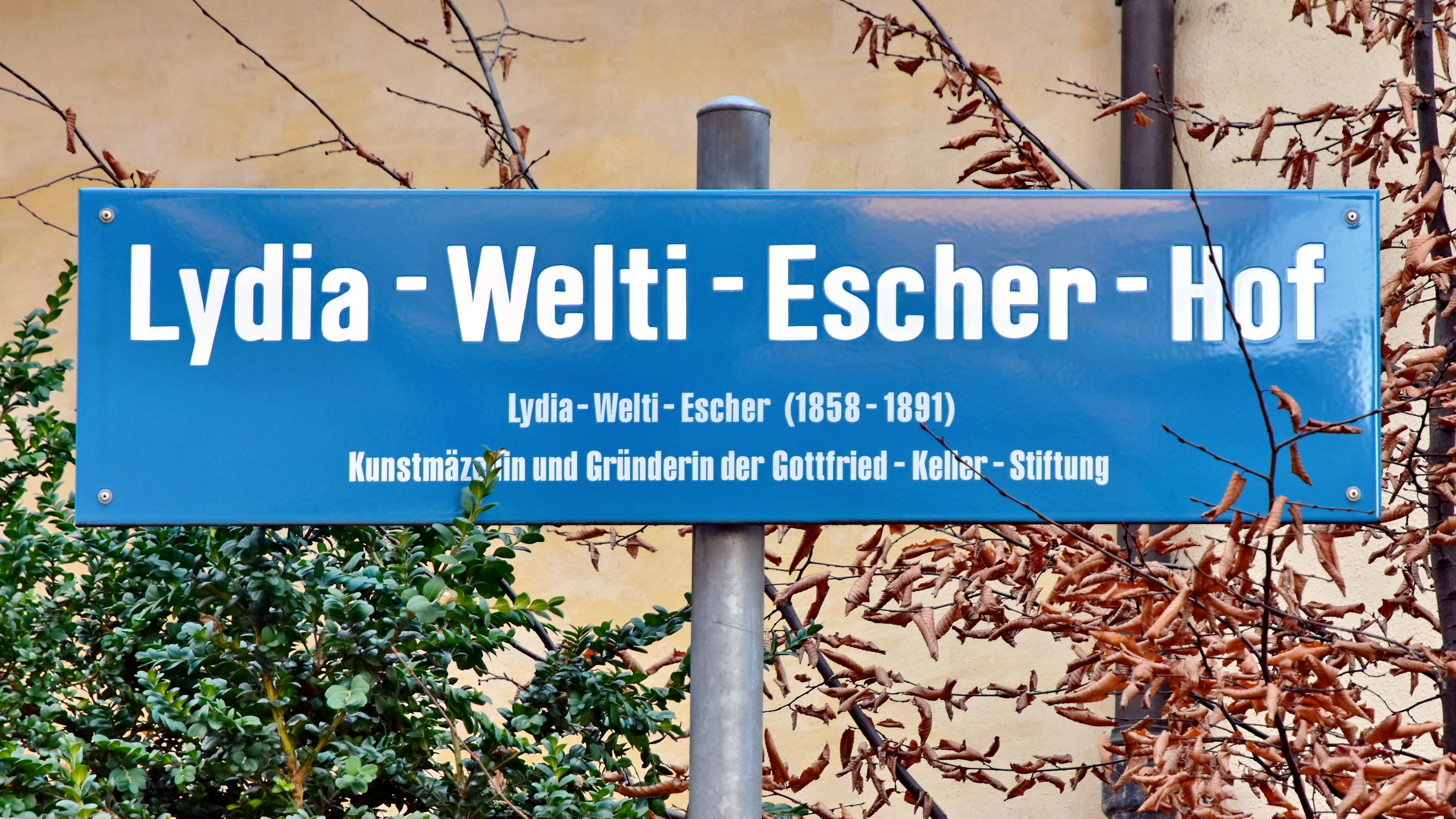
Lydia-Welti-Escher-Hof

The Gottfried Keller Foundation, based in Winterthur, is listed as a Swiss inventory of cultural property of national and regional significance.

On the 150th anniversary of her birth, 10 July 2008, Lydia Welti-Escher was honored for her services to the arts by the Gesellschaft zu Fraumünster with a commemorative plaque in front of the Kunsthaus Zürich. On 20 August 2008, the City of Zürich renamed the location to Lydia Welti-Escher Hof ('Lydia Welti-Escher Court') in her honor.

== In television and theater ==
- 2014: Die letzten Stunden der Lydia Welti-Escher. Play by Christine Ahlborn.
- 2013: Die Schweizer: Kampf um den Gotthard – Alfred Escher und Stefano Franscini. Television documentary play produced by Schweizer Radio und Fernsehen
