= Alfred Escher =

19th-century Swiss politician and railroad entrepreneur

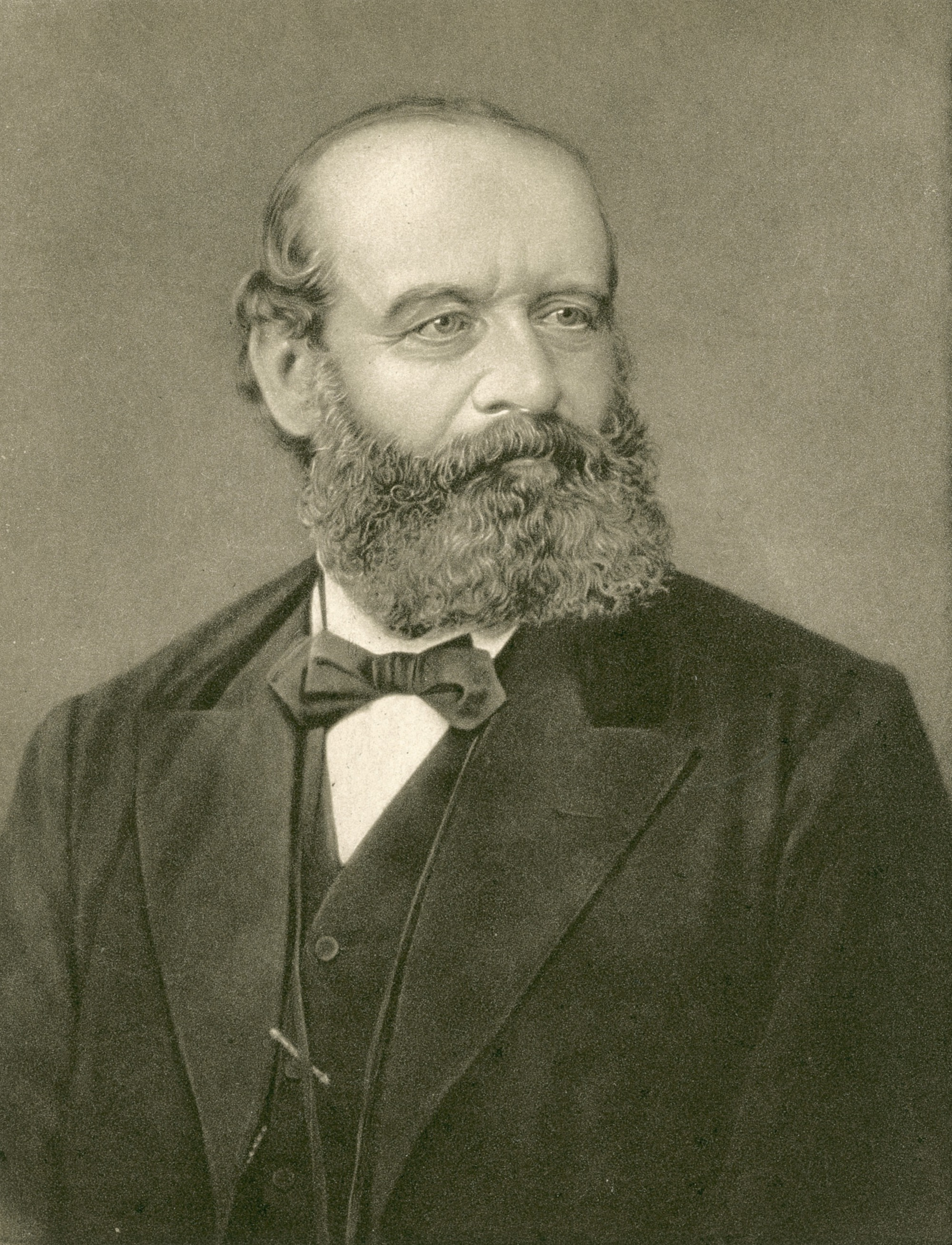
- Escher around 1875

Member of the National Council (Switzerland)
- In office 6 November 1848 – 6 December 1882
- Succeeded by: Konrad Cramer
- Constituency: Zürich-Südwest

Personal details
- Born: Johann Heinrich Alfred Escher vom Glas; February 20, 1819 Zürich, Switzerland
- Died: December 6, 1882 (aged 63) Enge, Switzerland
- Party: Free Radical Liberals
- Spouse: Augusta Uebel (m. 1857; died 1864)
- Children: 2, including Lydia
- Education: University of Zurich
- Occupation: Businessman; banker; politician

Johann Heinrich Alfred Escher vom Glas, colloquially Alfred Escher, (20 February 1819 – 6 December 1882) was a Swiss business magnate, banker, railway pioneer and politician who most notably served on the National Council from 1848 to 1882 for the Liberal Party.

Escher was born into a well-established old family of Zurich, Switzerland. Through his numerous political posts and his significant role in the foundation and management of the Swiss Northeastern Railway, the Swiss Federal Institute of Technology, Credit Suisse, Swiss Life and the Gotthard Railway, Escher had an unmatched influence on Switzerland's political and economic development in the 19th century.

== Early life and education ==
Escher was born 20 February 1819 in the Neuberg on Hirschengraben, Zurich, Switzerland, the younger of two children, to Heinrich Escher (1776–1853), a dry goods merchant, estate owner and insect researcher, and Henriette "Lydia" Escher (née Zollikofer; 1797–1868). His older sister was Anna Lydia Clementine Stockar (née Escher; 1816–1886).

He was a scion of the Escher vom Glas family, an old and influential dynasty, who had produced many officials and politicians. They belonged among the city's upper class. The family reputation however has been severely damaged by his great-grandfather, Hans Caspar Escher-Werdmüller (1731–1781), who had a child out of wedlock, and subsequently emigrated. His grandfather Hans Caspar Escher-Keller (1755–1831) almost brought the whole of Zürich to financial ruin when he went bankrupt. His father became wealthy again through speculative land deals, merchant activities and as a plantation owner in North America, where he also partnered with Baron Jean-Conrad Hottinguer. His family owned a coffee plantation in Cuba between 1815 and 1845 that employed slaves.

His mother hailed from an old nobilitated family of St. Gallen. His initial years were spent at the Neuberg, the house where he was born, until the family relocated to the newly-built country house,Villa Belvoir, outside of Zurich, in Enge (which now is part of the city) in 1831. Escher was taught privately by various tutors, including theologian Alexander Schweizer, and Oswald Heer, who was to become a paleo-botanist and entomologist. Escher attended the Zürich Obergymnasium from 1835 to 1837. He mostly grew up isolated from the public with a sickly mother, who never left their country estate. He then studied law at the University of Zurich. In 1838/39 he spent two semesters abroad at the University of Bonn and Berlin, though these stays were marred by serious illness. During his studies, Escher became involved in the Zofingia student society, which he joined in 1837. He served as president of the society's Zürich section in 1839/40 and in September 1840 became overall president of the whole society. Escher himself repeatedly cited the Zofingia as a major influence on the development of his personality. With a dissertation on Roman law, Escher gained his doctorate "summa cum laude" from the University of Zürich. Having completed his studies, Escher needed to think carefully about his future career, so he went to Paris for several months to contemplate the matter.

== Political career ==
Following his return to Zürich in the summer of 1843 Escher devoted himself to a number of academic projects. He did preparatory work on a wide-ranging history of Swiss law, which never came to fruition. Escher also planned to give lectures at the University of Zürich, Switzerland. In February 1844 he gave a trial lecture, whereupon the university governing council appointed him as a lecturer in the Faculty of Political Science. In addition to his academic pursuits, the radical-liberal Escher was politically active: he met regularly with former student friends in the "Academic Wednesday Society" to discuss topical political issues and wrote a number of articles for the Neue Zürcher Zeitung. In August 1844 Escher, now 25 years old, was elected to the Zürich's Cantonal Parliament. He was now able to play an active part in political debates of the time, most notably the expulsion of the Jesuits from the Swiss Confederation, a position on which Escher played a prominent role in the anti-Jesuit camp. In 1845 and 1846 Escher took part in the Federal Council of Cantonal Representatives (Tagsatzung) in Zürich as Third Envoy, which brought him into contact with Switzerland's leading politicians. In 1847 Escher was appointed as Zürich's Chief Administrator, and in the summer of 1848 he was elected to the cantonal government. With the introduction of the new Swiss Federal Constitution, it became necessary to put together the first ever national parliament. On 15 October 1848 Escher was elected to the National Council and was appointed its vice-president on 7 November 1848. Escher was to sit on the National Council without interruption until his death 34 years later. He was elected to serve as National Council President (the highest public office in Switzerland) four times (in 1849, 1856 and 1862; in 1855 Escher declined the post for health reasons).

=== Opposition and criticism ===
Thanks to his many political posts and his position as one of the founders of the Swiss Northeastern Railway (1852/53) and Credit Suisse (1856), Escher commanded an unusual amount of power. He attracted a number of nicknames as a result, including "King Alfred I" or the "Princeps". His political eminence was bound to attract critics. The Democratic Movement called for the people to be given a greater say on political issues. The devotees who surrounded Alfred Escher – known as the "Escher system" – were the avowed enemies of the Democrats. The fight was taken to the "Escher system" by means of pamphlets and public assemblies, and ultimately this resulted in a weakening of Escher's influence.

Another serious problem he faced was that his Northeastern Railway was sliding further and further into financial crisis in the 1870s. The company's share price plummeted from 658 Swiss francs in 1868 to 70 francs in 1877. This process prompted irate investors to heap criticism on Alfred Escher, even though he had already resigned from his position as chairman of the Northeastern Railway board in 1871. Even the financial difficulties involved in the Gotthard project were blamed on Escher by various parties.

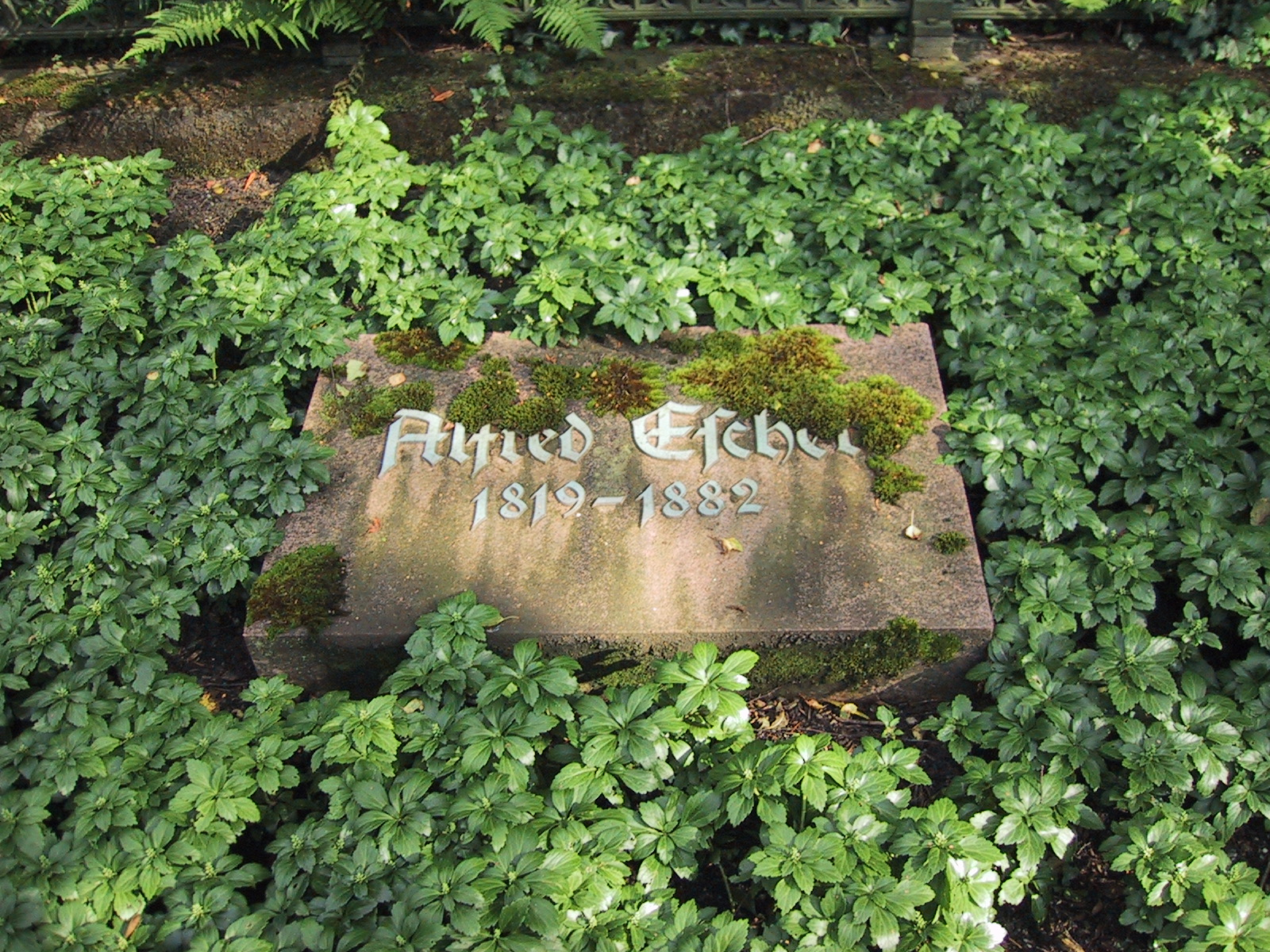
Alfred Escher's grave in the Manegg cemetery in Zürich

== Business career ==
=== First railway projects ===
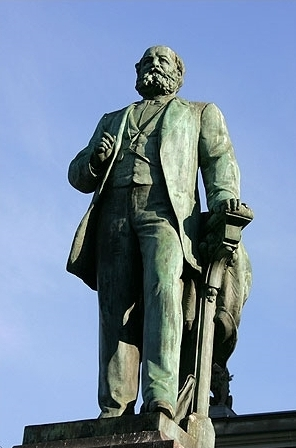
Alfred Escher memorial statue by Richard Kissling, Bahnhofplatz, Zürich

"The rail tracks are approaching Switzerland, moving nearer on all sides. People are coming up with plans to route the railways around Switzerland. There is thus a danger that Switzerland will be entirely circumvented and that, in the future, it will be left with no option but to present to the world the sad face of Europe's forgotten backwater." With these words uttered in late 1849 Alfred Escher expressed his concern that modernity risked passing Switzerland by. And he had good cause for such concern, since at the time when the distances covered by railway tracks in Europe were steadily increasing, driving economic development as they did, Switzerland was doing little to join in. The fate of the new Swiss Confederation established in 1848 became inextricably bound up with the advent of the railways. There was basic agreement on the need for railways, but precious little agreement on how or where they should be built. In 1852 Escher helped push through a railway law drafted entirely in line with his own conceptions: railway construction and operation would be left to private companies. This soon led to a veritable railway boom in Switzerland. Within a very short period of time competing railway companies were set up, including in 1852–53 the Swiss Northeastern Railway, with Escher and Bruno Hildebrand at its helm. In this way the Swiss rapidly closed the gap in rail-related knowledge and technology between themselves and foreign operators.

=== Federal Polytechnic Institute ===
The railway boom was accompanied by a call for people with the technical training required in the new economic sector. In Switzerland there were then no educational establishments for engineers and technicians. Escher was at the forefront of the struggle to rise to the technological and manufacturing challenges of the time. After years of political wrangling the Federal Polytechnic Institute (now known as ETH Zurich) was finally founded in 1854/55. From 1854 to 1882 Escher was vice-chairman of the Federal School Council, the governing body of the Polytechnic Institute. The establishment of this institution for technology and the natural sciences was the key act in laying the foundation for Switzerland's later pre-eminence in education and research.

=== Credit Suisse ===
The large amounts of capital involved in constructing railways posed new challenges to the rail companies. The capital had to be raised outside Switzerland because there were no institutions within the country able to make money available in the huge quantities required. This dependence on foreign lenders resulted in those lenders seeking to influence the growth and development of the Swiss rail companies. Alfred Escher did not like this state of affairs. In 1856 he succeeded in establishing a new bank, Schweizerische Kreditanstalt (now known as Credit Suisse), primarily for the purpose of securing financing for his own rail company, the Swiss Northeastern Railway. Increasingly, however, Escher's bank financed other public and private sector endeavours too, thereby developing into an important lender for the Swiss economy and the founding institution of the Zürich's financial centre.

=== Gotthard railway ===
Despite the expansion of the rail network in the 1850s, there was still a danger that Switzerland would be left out of the wider European scheme of things. Although connections with the main Swiss towns and cities had soon been established, there was still no major north–south route. Alfred Escher initially favoured a trans-Alpine link via the Lukmanier, he changed his mind and became an advocate of the Gotthard project. Escher threw all the economic and political resources at his command behind this ambitious project. He consulted engineers and other experts, and conducted negotiations with the authorities at home and abroad. At the international Gotthard conference held in the autumn of 1869, the final decision was made in favour of the Gotthard line. In 1871 the Gotthardbahn-Gesellschaft (Gotthard Railway Company) was established, with Escher as its chairman. The construction phase was hampered by a variety of problems in realising the project and a – given the scale of the project, rather modest – budget overrun of around 11%. Escher was exposed to increasingly vociferous criticism, prompting him to resign as chairman of the Gotthard Rail Company in 1878. When the builders of the Gotthard tunnel broke through in 1880, he was not invited to attend. In 1882 this landmark project was finally completed and the Gotthard tunnel was ceremoniously opened. This time, Escher was invited but unable to attend the opening celebrations because of his poor health. The Gotthard tunnel played a vital part in putting Switzerland on the international transport map. In the years following its inauguration the volume of goods and passengers passing through soared, turning Switzerland into an important transit country.

== Public offices and positions ==
The number and importance of the positions and public offices held by Alfred Escher remains unparalleled in Swiss history to date, as the following (not exhaustive) list illustrates:

Duration	Office/position
1839–1840	President of the Zürich section of the "Zofingia" student society
1840–1841	Central President of the Swiss Zofingia
1844–1847	Lecturer at the University of Zürich
1844–1882	Member of Zürich's cantonal parliament (President: 1848, 1852, 1857, 1861, 1864, 1868)
1845–1848	Member of the Federal Council of Cantonal Representatives (Tagsatzungsgesandter) (with interruptions)
1845–1855	Member of the Board of Education
1846–1849	Member of the Zürich Legislative Council
1847–1848	Cantonal Chief Administrator of Zürich
1848–1855	Government of the Canton of Zürich (Regierungsrat) (chairman: 1849, 1851/52, 1853/54)
1848–1849	Member of the Zürich Financial Council
1848	Federal Commissioner in the Canton of Ticino
1848–1882	National Councillor (President: 1849/50, 1856/57, 1862/63)
1849–1855	Member of the Zürich Church Council
1849–1852	Member of the Zürich State Council
1853	Chairman of the Board of the Zürich-Bodenseebahn (Zürich-Lake Constance Railway Company)
1853–1872	Chairman of the Board of the Swiss Northeastern Railway
1854–1882	Vice-chairman of the Swiss School Council
1856–1877	Chairman of the Board of Directors of Schweizerische Kreditanstalt (Credit Suisse)
1857–1874	Supervisory Board of Schweizerische Lebensversicherungs- und Rentenanstalt (Swiss Life)
1859–1874	Member of the Greater City Council (Parliament) of Zürich
1860–1869	Chairman of the School Administration Committee, Zürich
1871–1878	Chairman of the executive board of the Gotthardbahn-Gesellschaft (Gotthard Railway Company)
1872–1882	Chairman of the Board of Directors of the Swiss Northeastern Railway
1880–1882	Chairman of the Board of Directors of Schweizerische Kreditanstalt (Credit Suisse)

== Personal life ==
On 23 April 1857, Escher married Auguste Henriette Anna Uebel (1838–1864), a daughter of German-born parents Bruno Uebel (1806–1840) and Julie Uebel (née von Geiger; 1816–1867), in Herrliberg on Lake Zurich. They had two daughters;

- Auguste Clementine Lydia Escher, colloquially Lydia Escher (1858–1891), who married Friedrich Emil Welti, a son of Emil Welti, who served on the Federal Council (Switzerland).
- Henriette Anna Hedwig Escher, colloquially Hedwig Escher (1861–1862), who died in childbed.

Since his only surviving daughter, Lydia, did not have any children and ended her tragic life by suicide in 1890, Escher has no living direct descendants.

Escher faced serious health problems throughout his life. He suffered repeated bouts of ill health throughout his life and on many occasions was obliged to spend long periods in convalescence. His susceptibility to illness was highly incompatible with his phenomenal appetite for work. During the critical phase of the Gotthard Tunnel construction in the mid-1870s Escher nearly worked himself to death. In 1878 he fell so badly ill that he was unable to leave "Belvoir" for several weeks. His life became a constant alternation between illness and recovery: asthma, fever, eye conditions, boils. However, this did not prevent Escher from fulfilling his political and business obligations whenever he could. In late November 1882 he fell badly ill again. Carbuncles developed on his back and he was plagued by a virulent fever. On the morning of 6 December 1882 Alfred Escher died on his "Belvoir" estate at Zürich/Enge. At his funeral service on 9 December 1882, which was held in Zürich's Fraumünster church, the Swiss political elite conferred the last honour on him: Federal Councillors, National and States Councillors as well as countless representatives of the Cantons were in attendance. In February 1883 a committee was formed for the purpose of erecting a memorial statue to Escher. The commission went to the sculptor Richard Kissling. The Alfred Escher memorial designed by Kissling and erected outside the Zürich main railway station was inaugurated on 22 June 1889. Alfred Escher was initially buried in the Enge cemetery, but when that was deconsecrated in 1925 his remains were moved to the Manegg cemetery.

== Legacy and research ==
Those wishing to research Alfred Escher have a rich store of source material at their disposal. First and foremost there is extensive correspondence connected with Escher. Escher corresponded with a number of eminent personages from the worlds of politics, industry and science. In 2006 the Alfred Escher Foundation was set up to conduct research into his life and achievements. The Alfred Escher Foundation's documentation centre can provide photocopies of the approximately 7,500 letters written to or by Alfred Escher as well as a range of standard reference works on Swiss history in the 19th century. The correspondence is also available in a multimedia edition, which is being posted online in stages.

== Escher's correspondence ==
- Jung, Joseph, ed. (2008). Alfred Escher zwischen Lukmanier und Gotthard. Briefe zur schweizerischen Alpenbahnfrage 1850–1882 (in German). edited and annotated by Bruno Fischer, Martin Fries and Susanna Kraus, with contributions by Joseph Jung and Helmut Stalder. Zurich: NZZ Libro. ISBN 978-3-03823-379-4.
- Jung, Joseph, ed. (2010). Alfred Eschers Briefe aus der Jugend- und Studentenzeit (1831–1843) (in German). edited and annotated by Bruno Fischer. Zurich: NZZ Libro. ISBN 978-3-03823-628-3.
- Jung, Joseph, ed. (2011). Alfred Eschers Briefwechsel (1843–1848). Jesuiten, Freischaren, Sonderbund, Bundesrevision (in German). edited and annotated by Björn Koch. Zurich: NZZ Libro. ISBN 978-3-03823-703-7.
- Jung, Joseph, ed. (2012). Alfred Eschers Briefwechsel (1848–1852). Aufbau des jungen Bundesstaates, politische Flüchtlinge und Neutralität (in German). edited and annotated by Sandra Wiederkehr. Zurich: NZZ Libro. ISBN 978-3-03823-723-5.
- Jung, Joseph, ed. (2013). Alfred Eschers Briefwechsel (1852–1866). Wirtschaftsliberales Zeitfenster, Gründungen, Aussenpolitik (in German). Zurich: NZZ Libro. ISBN 978-3-03823-853-9.
- The series is to be continued (to a total of six volumes).

== Bibliography ==
- Jung, Joseph (2009). Alfred Escher 1819–1882. Aufstieg, Macht, Tragik (in German) (expanded 4th ed.). Zurich: NZZ Libro. ISBN 978-3-03823-522-4.
- Jung, Joseph, ed. (2009). Lydia Welti-Escher (1858–1891). Biographie. Quellen, Materialien und Beiträge (in German) (heavily expanded new ed.). Zurich: NZZ Libro. ISBN 978-3-03823-557-6.
- Jung, Joseph (2006). Alfred Escher 1819–1882. Der Aufbruch zur modernen Schweiz (in German). Zurich: NZZ Libro. ISBN 978-3-03823-236-0. 4 volumes.
- Schmid, Walter P. (1988). Der junge Alfred Escher. Sein Herkommen und seine Welt (in German). Zurich: Rohr. ISBN 3-85865-503-1.
- Craig, Gordon A. (1988). The Triumph of Liberalism: Zurich in the Golden Age, 1830–1869. New York: Scribner. ISBN 978-0-684-19062-4.
- Gagliardi, Ernst (1919). Alfred Escher. Vier Jahrzehnte neuerer Schweizergeschichte (in German). Frauenfeld: Huber.

Political offices
Preceded by Jakob Robert Steiger	President of the National Council; 1849/1850	Succeeded by Johann Konrad Kern
Preceded by Jules Martin	President of the National Council; 1856/1857	Succeeded by Paul Migy
Preceded by Karl Karrer	President of the National Council; 1862/1863	Succeeded by Joachim Heer
