= Emil Welti =

Member of the Swiss Federal Council

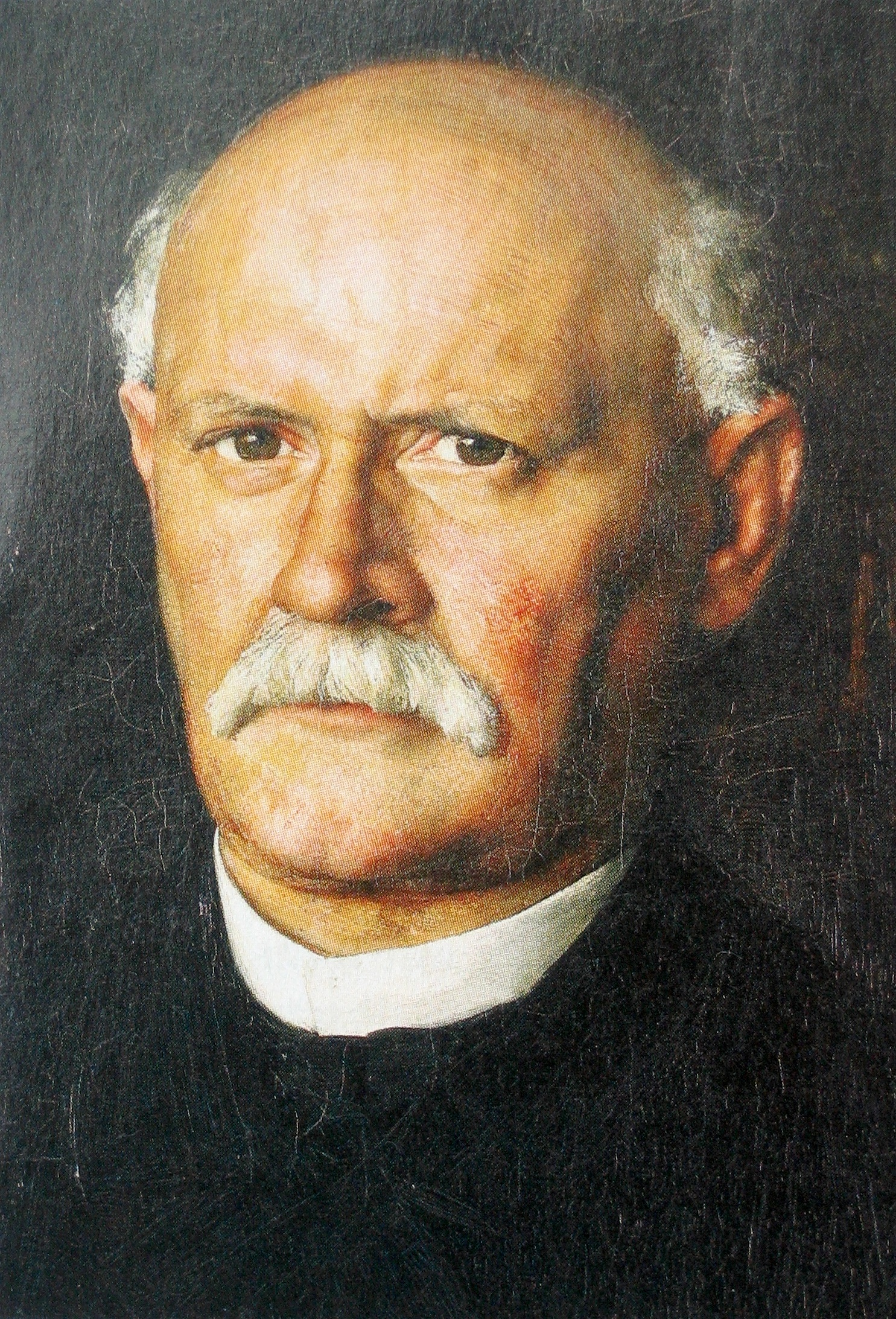
- Welti, c. 1870

Member of Federal Council (Switzerland)
- In office 8 December 1866 – 31 December 1891
- Constituency: Canton of Aargau

Member of Council of States (Switzerland)
- In office 9 June 1857 – 2 December 1866

Personal details
- Born: Friedrich Emil Welti; 23 April 1825 Zurzach, Switzerland
- Died: 24 February 1899 (aged 73) Kehrsatz, Switzerland
- Party: Free Radical Liberals
- Spouse: Carolina Gross (m. 1853)
- Relations: Lydia Welti-Escher (daughter-in-law)
- Children: 2, including Friedrich Emil
- Occupation: Attorney, politician

Friedrich Emil Welti, known as Emil Welti (23 April 1825 – 24 February 1899), was a Swiss politician, lawyer and judge. From 1856 to 1866, he was a member of the government of the canton of Aargau and, beginning in 1857, the Council of States. In 1867, Welti was elected to the Bundesrat as a representative of the liberal-radical faction (today's FDP).

Welti was elected Federal President six times, a total exceeded only by Karl Schenk. He is remembered for unifying the army, overhauling the Federal Constitution of 1874, and opening political doors for the Gotthard Railway.

== Early life ==
Welti was the eldest of nine children. He was born to a distinguished political family. His father, Jakob Welti, was a parish councilor and chief justice of Zurzach. His grandfather Abraham Welti belonged to both the National Assembly of the Helvetic Republic and the Consulta. After attending community and secondary school in Zurzach, Welti attended the Kantonsschule Aarau from 1840 to 1844, where he achieved top of his class and belonged to KTV fraternity. From 1844 to 1847, he studied law along with his school friend Samuel Wildi at Friedrich Schiller University in Jena as well as the Friedrich Wilhelm University in Berlin. He was taught by Adolf Rudorff, Georg Friedrich Puchta, and Friedrich Schelling.

At his father's request, Welti renounced an academic career and instead pursued law. In 1847, he took part in the Sonderbundskrieg as actuary of the commission of inquiry against the war council of the Sonderbundes. From 1852 to 1856, he was president of Zurzach district court.

== Career ==
=== Cantonal and federal politics ===
In 1856, Welti was elected to the Grand Council of the Canton of Aargau and to the government council. During his first term, he was head of the Justice Department. He introduced a new Criminal Code, Code of Criminal Procedure and the construction of Lenzburg prison. From 1862 to 1866, he stood ran Education Department and created a new school law. His demands for civil marriage and full legal equality for Jews were not initially accepted. In the years 1858, 1862 and 1866, he was Landammann.

In 1857, the Great Council elected Welti to the Council of States and confirmed it annually until 1866. He immediately took a leading role and commented on issues such as the trade agreement with France and a railway line through the Alps. In the years 1860 and 1866, he was a Council President. In 1860, the Federal Council sent him to Geneva as Federal Commissioner to mediate during the Savoy trade talks. Geneva gave him honorary citizenship. In 1864 he again intervened in Geneva when trouble followed the State Council elections riots. In 1866, he received an honorary doctorate from the University of Zurich, and in 1867, honorary citizenship of the city of Aarau.

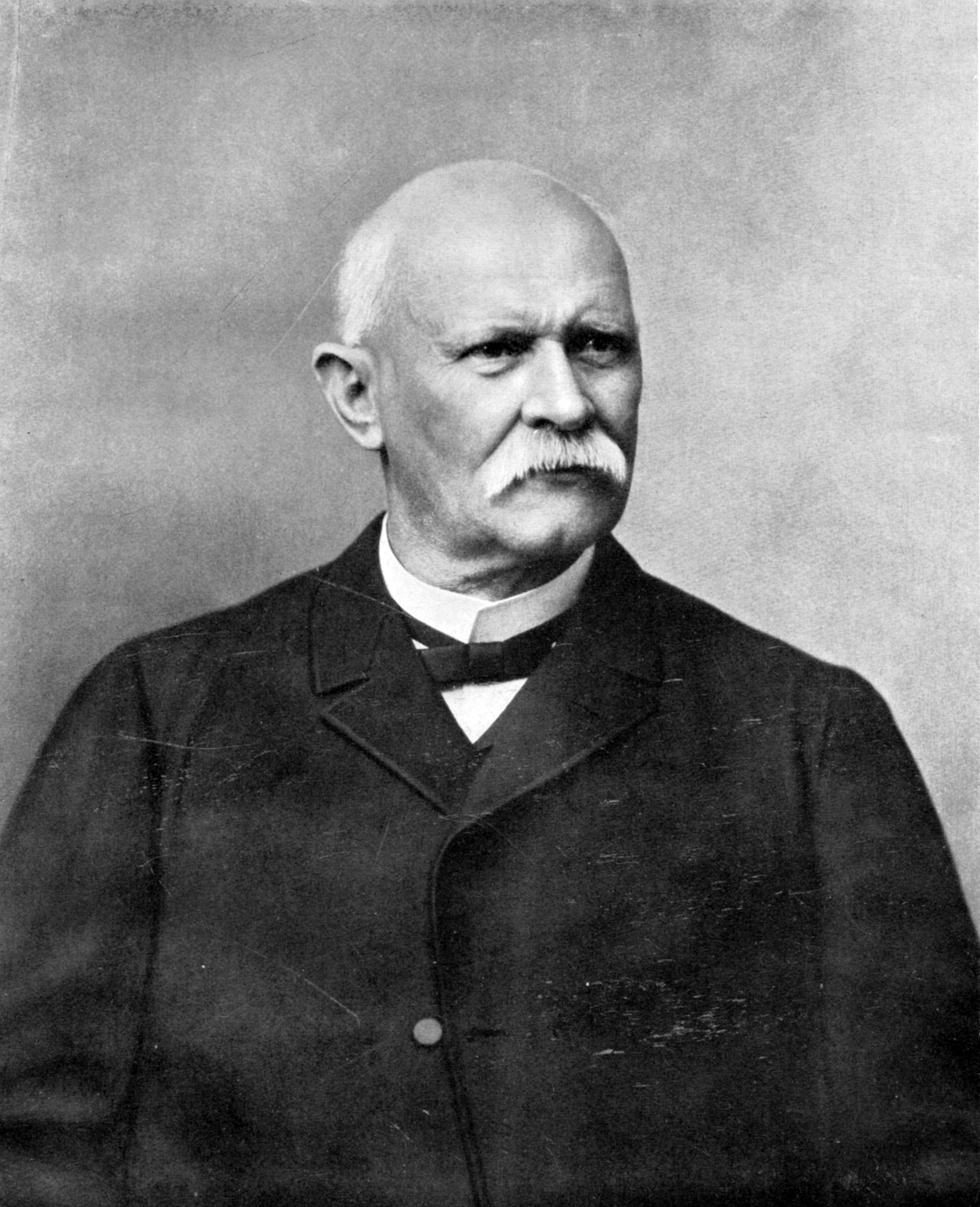
Emil Welti around 1870

=== Federal Council ===
In the Federal Council elections in 1863, Welti lost to the incumbent Friedrich Frey-Herosé. After the latter retired at the end of 1866, Welti became a promising candidate. He received support from the left wing as a supporter of a centralized state. Representatives of the industry around "railway king" Alfred Escher backed him as a staunch supporter of the Gotthard railway. In the election of the fifth member of the government on 8 December 1866 Welti received in the first ballot 103 of 159 valid votes, taking office on 1 January 1867.

From the beginning, Welti was one of the most influential figures in the state executive. During his 24-year tenure he represented four different departments: Military Department (1867–68, 1870–71, 1873–75), Political Department (1869, 1872, 1876, 1880, 1884), Post and Railway Department (1877–79, 1882–83, 1885–91) and Justice and Police Department (1881). In the years 1869, 1872, 1876, 1880, 1884 and 1891 he was Federal President. Because of his appearance and his German-friendly attitude, he was sometimes referred to as "Swiss Bismarck ".

As Secretary of Defense, Welti pushed for the merger of the individual cantonal armies into a national army. The necessity became especially evident after the Franco-Prussian War of 1871, when the army's weakness was revealed and conflicts of competence with General Hans Herzog. In the debate on the revision of the Federal Constitution, Welti represented a centralist position. However, the constitutional draft of 1872, which was decisively influenced by him, narrowly failed referendum earning 50.5% no votes. He had to accept federalist compromises, but he was able to enforce his most important concern, the unification of law, in the final constitution of 1874. He kept himself largely out of the Kulturkampf and took a mediating role.

Railroad policy was another focus. When asked whether the planned Alpine railway should lead through the Gotthard or the Splügen, he could not intervene directly as a representative of the federal government, as the railway was a matter for the cantons and private companies. In negotiations, however, he was able to convince Italy and the German Reich to support the Gotthard project and to subsidize it. He guaranteed the federal government a right of supervision and codetermination, since he did not want to leave this project of national importance to the private sector alone. In 1878, when the company threatened to fail due to increasing costs, it was able to supply additional subsidies in parliament despite fierce opposition.

For the first time in 1862, the repurchase of private railways by the federal government became the subject of debate, but succumbed to the resistance of the circles around Alfred Escher. The situation changed with the railway crisis in the late 1870s. In 1883, the Confederation could finally have asserted its right of repurchase, but because of the overvaluation of its assets, the price would have been too high. Welti put the financial management of the railway companies under federal supervision. After negotiations with the Nordostbahn had failed, the federal government was able to take over in 1890 a large share of the Jura-Simplon-Bahn.

=== Resignation ===
In 1891, Welti was able to conclude a repurchase agreement with the Centralbahn, which was approved by Parliament. A referendum came about, and on 6 December 1891 the repurchase agreement was rejected by a two-thirds majority. The same day, Welti announced his retirement for the end of the year. Parliament tried to dissuade him but accepted his resignation on 17 December. In 1898 his successor Josef Zemp nationalized the most important private railways. Another reason for Welti's resignation may have been the family tragedy involving daughter-in-law Lydia Welti-Escher, who took her own life on December 12 after she was locked up in a Roman madhouse the year before.

In politics, Welti accepted no more tasks. On behalf of the Federal Council, however, he worked in trade and railway matters. He devoted himself to scientific studies and occasionally taught at the Municipal Gymnasium in Bern. At the age of 73, he died of concussion and pneumonia.

During his time in office he held the following departments:

- Military Department (1867–1868)
- Political Department as President of the Confederation (1869)
- Military Department (1870–1871)
- Political Department as President of the Confederation (1872)
- Military Department (1873–1875)
- Political Department as President of the Confederation (1876)
- Department of Posts and Telegraph (1877–1878)
- Department of Posts and Railways (1879)
- Political Department as President of the Confederation (1880)
- Department of Justice and Police (1881)
- Department of Posts and Railways (1882–1883)
- Political Department as President of the Confederation (1884)
- Department of Posts and Railways (1885–1891)

He was President of the Confederation six times, in 1869, 1872, 1876, 1880, 1884 and 1891.

== Personal life ==
In 1853, he married Carolina Gross. The couple had two children, Louise Mathilde and Friedrich Emil Welti, the latter of whom married Alfred Escher's daughter Lydia Escher.

The 2013 Swiss four-part documentaryAlfred Escher and Stefano Franscini - Battle for the Gotthard mentioned him.

== Literature ==
- Helge Dvorak: Biographical Dictionary of the German fraternity. Volume I: Politicians. Subchapter 6: T-Z. Winter, Heidelberg 2005, ISBN 3-8253-5063-0 , p 256-258.
- Adolf Frei: Federal Councilor Emil Welti 1825-1899. In: Biographical Dictionary of Aargau 1803-1957. Edited by the Historical Society of the Canton of Aargau. Sauerland, Aarau 1958 (at the same time Argovia 68/69), P. 269-284.
- Jakob Hunziker : Emil Welti in Aargau. In: Argovia 28 (1900), pp. 1–79.
- Peter Kaupp : Welti, Emil. In: From Aldenhoven to Zittler. Members of the fraternity Arminia on the Burgkeller-Jena who have emerged in the last 100 years in public life. Dieburg 2000.
- Wilhelm Oechsli : Welti, Emil. In: General German Biography (ADB). Volume 55, Duncker & Humblot, Leipzig 1910, pp. 376–384.
- Heinrich Staehelin:. In: Urs Altermatt (ed.):. 2nd Edition. Artemis Verlag, Zurich / Munich 1991, ISBN 3-7608-0702-X , S. 178-183.
- Heinrich Staehelin: Welti, Emil. In: Historical Dictionary of Switzerland

Political offices
Preceded by François Briatte	President of the Council of States; 1860	Succeeded by Johann Jakob Blumer
Preceded by Johann Jakob Rüttimann	President of the Council of States; 1866	Succeeded by Christian Sahli
Preceded by Friedrich Frey-Herosé	Member of the Swiss Federal Council; 1866–1891	Succeeded by Josef Zemp
