= Tosun (construction equipment) =

Tosun is a remote controlled armored wheel loader developed in Turkey for combat engineering missions. It is manufactured by Best Group and used by the Turkish Army and Turkish Police.

- Power : 225 HP/168 kW
- Speed : 40 km/h
- Steering System : Articulated
- Articulated Rotation Angle : 40º
- Bucket capacity : 3,5 m3
- Technical dimensions : 3000 x 8000 x 3690 mm
- Weight : 23.240 kg
- Fuel capacity : 300 lt
- Bucket Width : 3000 mm

== History ==
The armored wheel loader was developed by the Ankara-based defense company Best Group in cooperation with the heavy equipment manufacturer Çukurova Makina from Mersin in 2015. The need for such construction equipment arose when removing the barricades and filling up the trenches built in 2015 by militants linked to the banned Kurdistan Workers' Party (PKK) in some residential areas in southeastern Turkey, such as in Yüksekova, Hakkari, Nusaybin, Mardin, and Sur, Diyarbakır. Attacks of militants with rocket-propelled grenades on the loader operator during the operation led to the initially armored-only vehicle being developed as an unmanned, remote-controlled vehicle.

== Description ==
The remote control system features NLOS communication up to 1,000 m (3,300 ft) and LOS communication up to 5,000 m (16,000 ft), and all vehicle functions have a delay of up to 250 ms. Tosun has eight situational awareness camera systems, enabling the operation of unmanned equipment in residential areas without direct sight.

As of the end of February 2018, there were a total of 85 Tosun in use. The vehicle can be operated remotely within a range of 5 km (3.1 mi) in open area at military cross-border operations. It is remotely operable within a range of 1 km (0.62 mi) in residential areas, where buildings are situated between the transmitter and the receiver.

== Use ==
Tosun vehicles were used during the building of the Syria–Turkey barrier, Operation Euphrates Shield, and Operation Idlib Shield. In the ongoing Operation Olive Branch, 43 Tosun vehicles are in use.

At the end of February 2018, it was reported that the United States and the United Arab Emirates showed interest in importing Tosun, which cost a sixth of that of similar vehicles deployed in the United States and Israel.
