= Çimsataş =

Turkish company

- Location within Turkey
- Built: 1979
- Location: Mersin, Turkey; Mersin, Turkey
- Coordinates: 36°50′56″N 34°43′48″E
- Industry: Construction machinery
- Products: Castings, forgings and working parts

Çimsataş, an acronym for Çukurova İnşaat Makinaları Sanayi ve Ticaret A.Ş. (literary "Çukurova Construction Machinery Industry and Commerce Inc."), is a manufacturer of construction machinery located in Mersin, Turkey.

== Location ==
The plant is situated in an industrial zone by the state highway D.400, to the east of Mersin and west of Tarsus. Its distance to Mersin is about 10 km (6.2 mi).

== Background ==
The company was established by the Çukurova Group in 1979. Its roots go back to manufacturing of Continuous track plates and fasteners (pins and retaining rings) beginning in 1972. It manufactured tracked loader in 1983 and wheel loader in 1987.

== Plant ==
It is a supplier of steel castings, steel forgings and machined parts to the industries of automotive, construction equipment and railway at local and European markets. The plant applies diverse high technologies for manufacturing such as green sand casting, no bake mold casting, closed-die forging, high speed machining, CAD CAM and heat treatment.

== Products ==
In 1992, Çimsaraş began producing air brakes for the automotive industry in Turkey under the license of ArvinMeritor. Between 1980 and 1994, it manufactured wheel loaders and hydraulic excavators under the license of Caterpillar, dominating the Turkish market. The company manufactured heavy equipment of Liebherr-Çukurova brand under the license of three well-known companies from 1994 to 2008. The company had a local market share of 25% for rubber-wheel excavators.
