= Caterpillar 930G =

Hydraulic front end loader

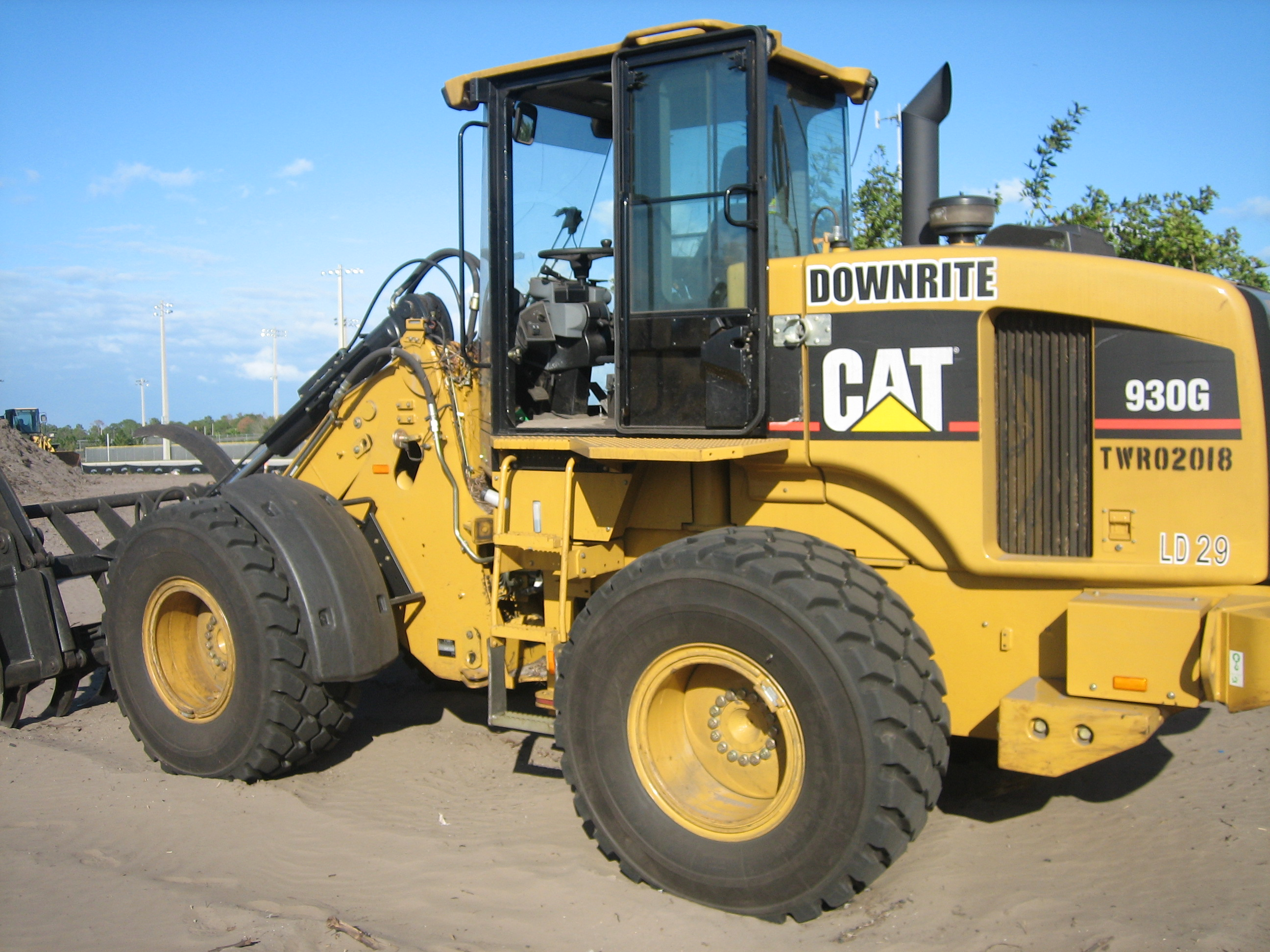
A Caterpillar 930G fitted with a loader rake on a residential construction site in South Florida.

The Caterpillar 930G is a hydraulic front end loader manufactured by Caterpillar Inc. The 930G, with 149 hp (111 kW) of net flywheel power at 2300 rpm, it is classified as a small wheeled loader in the line of Caterpillar's excavators. The MSRP of a standard 930G is $145,400.

== Specifications ==
=== Engine ===
- Net Flywheel Power: 149 hp (110 kW)
- Net Power (ISO 9249)(1997): 150 hp (111 kW)
- Net Power (SAE J1349): 149 hp (110 kW)
- Net Power (EEC 80/1269): 150 hp (111 kW)

=== Weights ===
- Operating Weight: 28,725 lb (13,029 kg)
- Maximum Weight: 29,044 lb (13,174 kg)
- Optional Counterweight: 470 kg (1040 lb)

== Attachments and work tools ==
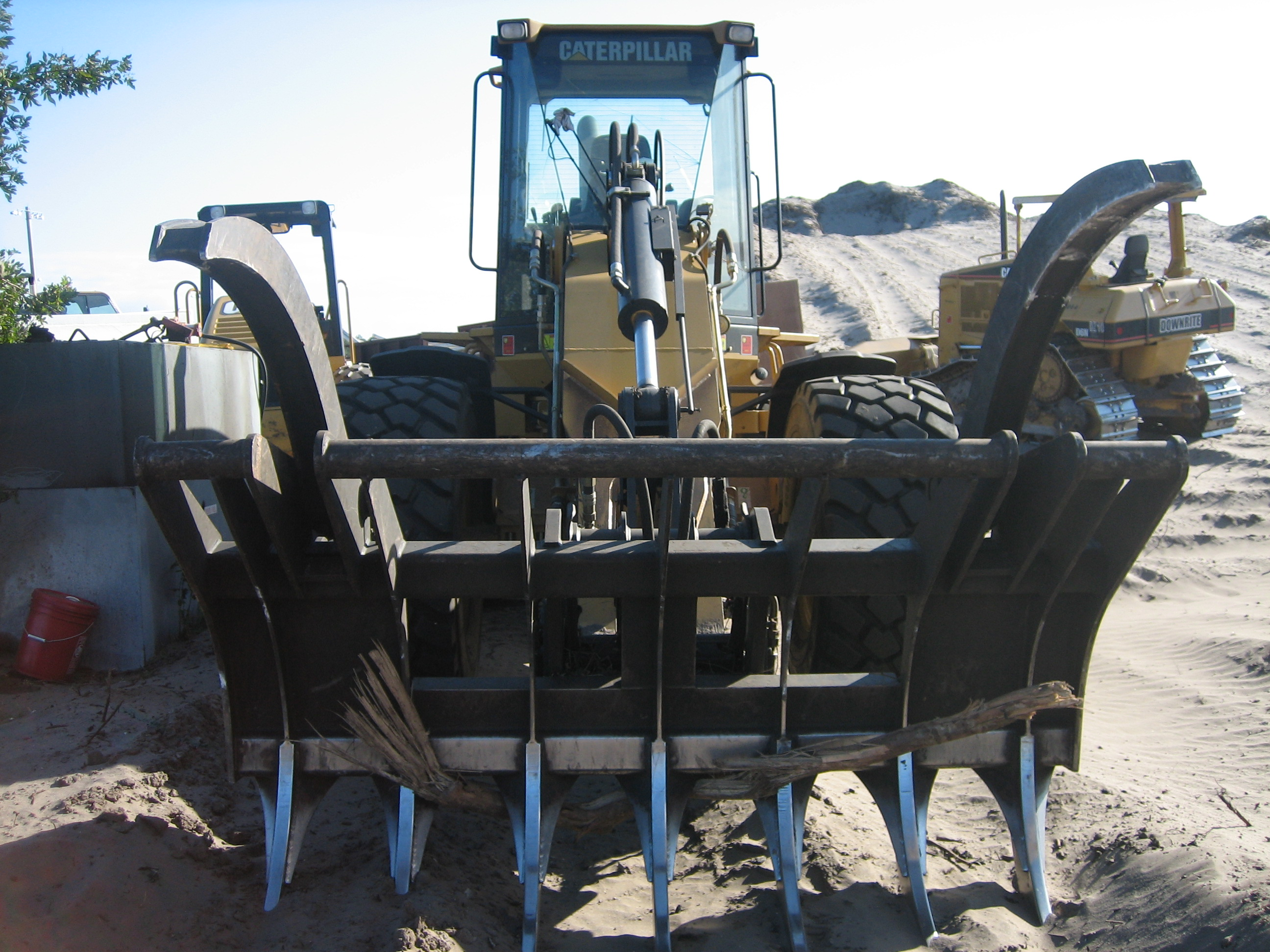
A 930G fitted with a loader rake.

- Angle blades
- Angle broom
- High dump and rollout buckets
- Loader rakes
- Log and lumber forks
- Material handling buckets
- Multi-purpose buckets
- Pallet forks
- Pickup broom
- Reversible plows
- Side dump buckets
- Top clamp buckets
- Woodchip buckets
