= LeTourneau L-2350 =

Loader that holds the Guinness World record for Biggest Earth Mover

The P&H L-2350 Wheel Loader (formerly the L-2350 loader) is a loader used for surface mining. It is manufactured by Komatsu Limited. It holds the Guinness World Record for Biggest Earth Mover. Designed to center-load haul trucks with capacities of up to 360 tonnes (400 short tons), the L-2350 provides an operating payload of 73 tonnes (80 short tons), a 7.03 metres (23.1 ft) lift height, and an 3.5 metres (11.5 ft) reach.

== History ==
The L-2350 was originally manufactured by LeTourneau Inc., LeTourneau Inc. was acquired by Marathon in 1972, Rowan Companies in 1986, and Joy Global in 2011.

Joy Global renamed the equipment as the P&H L-2350.

== Specifications ==
- Operational weight 266.62 t (262.41 long tons; 293.90 short tons)
- Power 1,715 kW (2,300 hp)
- Engine 16 Cylinder 65 Litre Detroit Diesel 4-cycle Turbocharged Aftercooler Engine or 16 cylinder 60 Litre Cummins Diesel 4-cycle Turbocharged Aftercooler Engine of 1,715 kW (2,300 hp)
- Hydraulic lifting payload 65 t (72 short tons)
- Standard Bucket 40.52 m^{3} (53.00 yd^{3})
- Fuel Tank 3,974 litres (1,050 US gal)
- Hydraulic Oil 1,230 litres (320 US gal)
- Tyres 70/70-57 SRG DT (diameter 4 m, width 1.78 m) [d=13.12 ft & w=5.84 ft]

- Cost $1.5M (2012)

== See also ==
- Diesel-electric transmission
