= Kramer Company =

German construction equipment company

Kramer-Werke GmbH
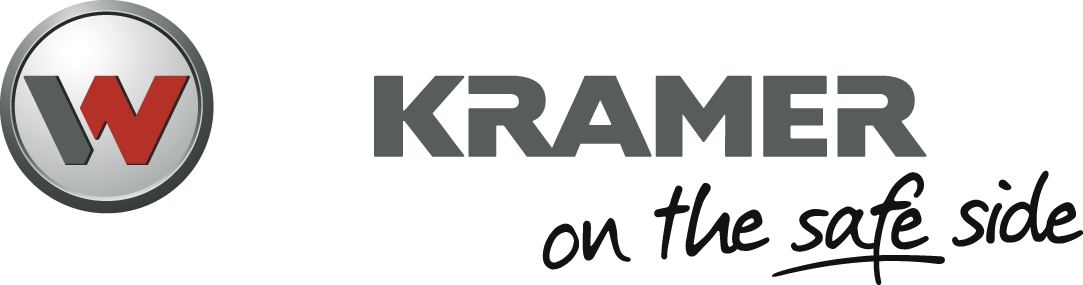
- Company type: GmbH (Germany)
- Industry: Construction Equipment
- Founded: Gutmadingen, Germany (1925)
- Headquarters: Pfullendorf, Germany
- Products: Wheel Loaders, Tele Wheel Loaders, Telehandlers
- Revenue: 1.533,9 Mil. EUR (Corporate revenue Wacker Neuson 2017)
- Website: www.kramer-online.com

Kramer-Werke GmbH is a manufacturer of compact construction machines, such as wheel loaders, tele wheel loaders and telehandlers located in Pfullendorf (Baden-Württemberg), Germany. It was formerly one of the pioneers in tractor manufacturing. It is part of the Wacker Neuson group.

== History ==
=== Founding until end of its tractor production (1925-1973) ===
In 1925 the brothers Kramer started to develop and produce mowing machines and Tractors in Gutmadingen, Germany. These were the first ones built in Germany and a revolution in agricultural work. The company headquarters was moved to Überlingen (Bodensee) in 1952.

Between 1957 and 1958, a special department for industrial and construction machines was set up. It caused a sensation, when Kramer introduced in 1968 the first German wheel loader with four-wheel drive and same-sized tires. Many other four-wheel steered machines followed this example.

In 1973 an important change of direction occurred, when the company decided to close down the "tractor" manufacturing division of the business and focused on construction machines. At this time the global tractor manufacturing business was changing with local companies suffering reduced market share as the major players consolidated and average tractor horse power increased. Many of the post war European tractor manufactures failed.

=== Concentration on construction equipment (1974-2000) ===
In 1987 the company's focus was adjusted to the four-wheel steering based models. At the same time the Kramer 312 SL became the first wheel loader with four-wheel steering to be mass-produced.

=== 2000 onwards ===
In 2000 the merger between Kramer-Werke GmbH and Neuson Baumaschinen GmbH took place. The company was renamed to Neuson Kramer Baumaschinen GmbH, situated in Linz

Since 2005 Kramer produces telehandlers for the agricultural machinery manufacturer Claas. As part of this cooperation, Claas acquired a minority interest in Kramer.

In March 2007 the merger between the Wacker Construction Equipment AG, Munich and the Neuson Kramer Baumaschinen AG was announced. The Wacker Neuson SE was created following this merger

On April 5, 2007, construction began on a 30 million Euro facility in Pfullendorf. The new production site has an area of about 16 hectare and the facility itself offers 160.000 square meters of factory space. The annual production capacity increased from 1000 to 6000 machines.

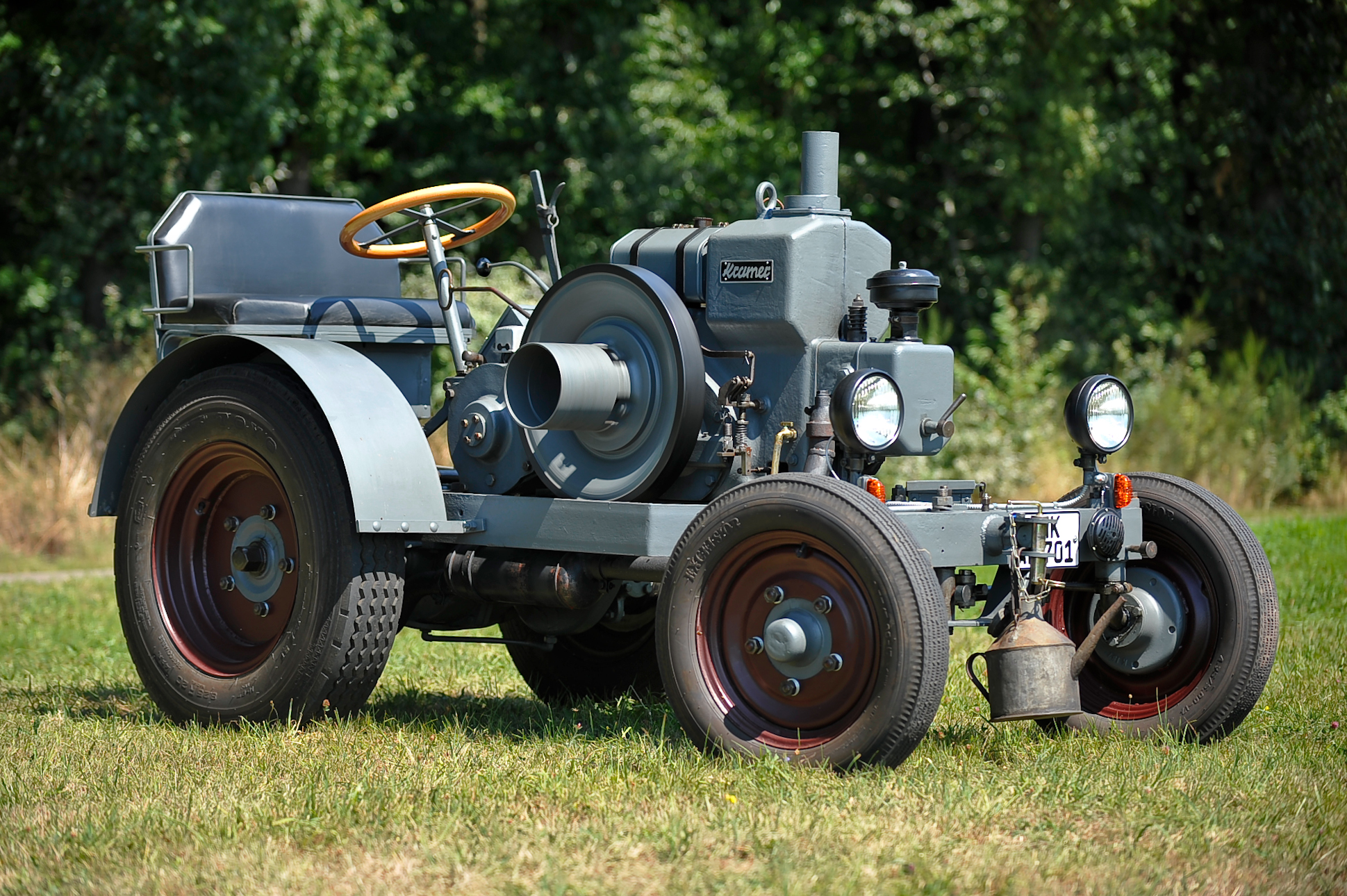
Kramer K18 from 1937

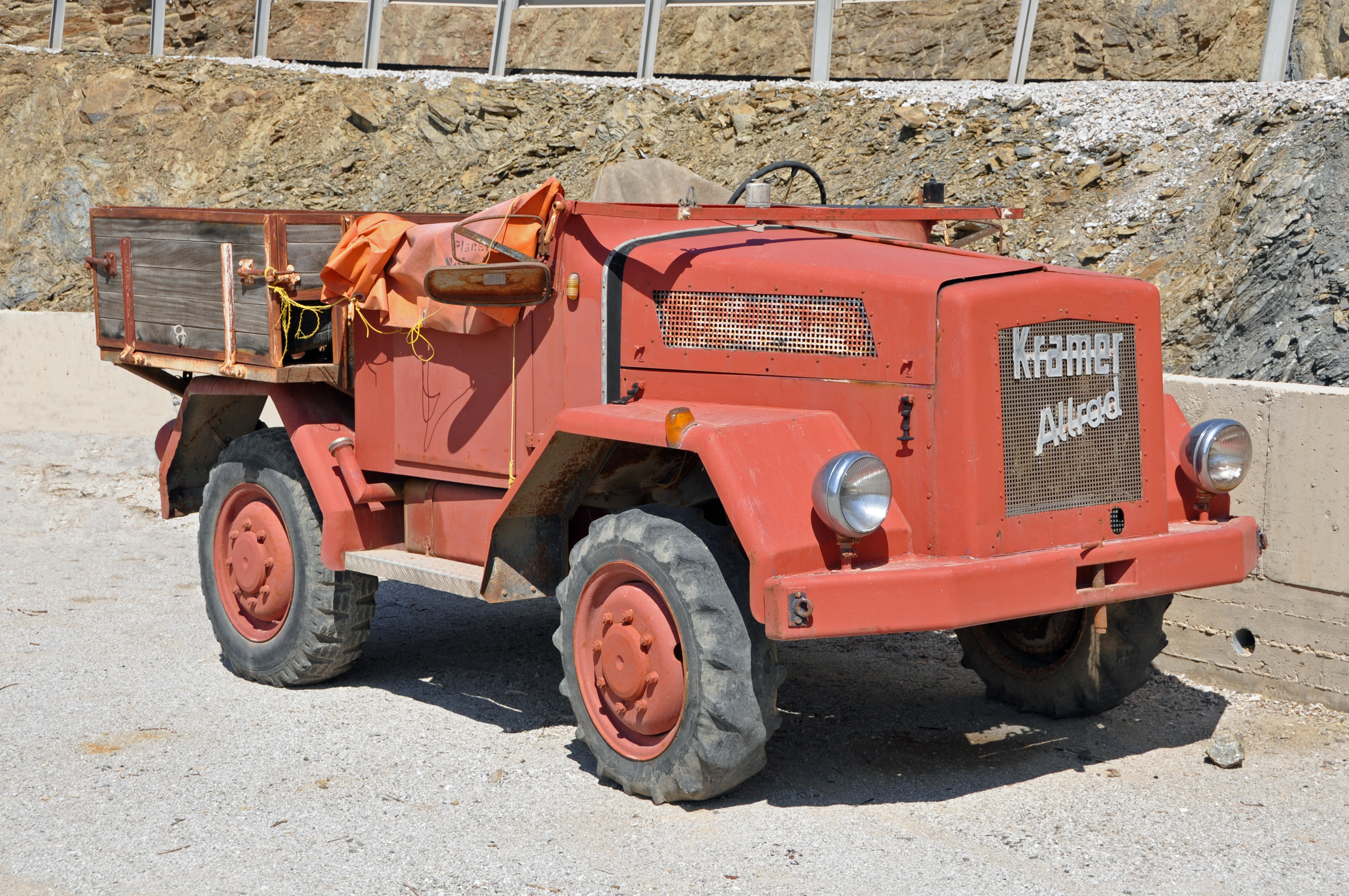
Kramer Allrad

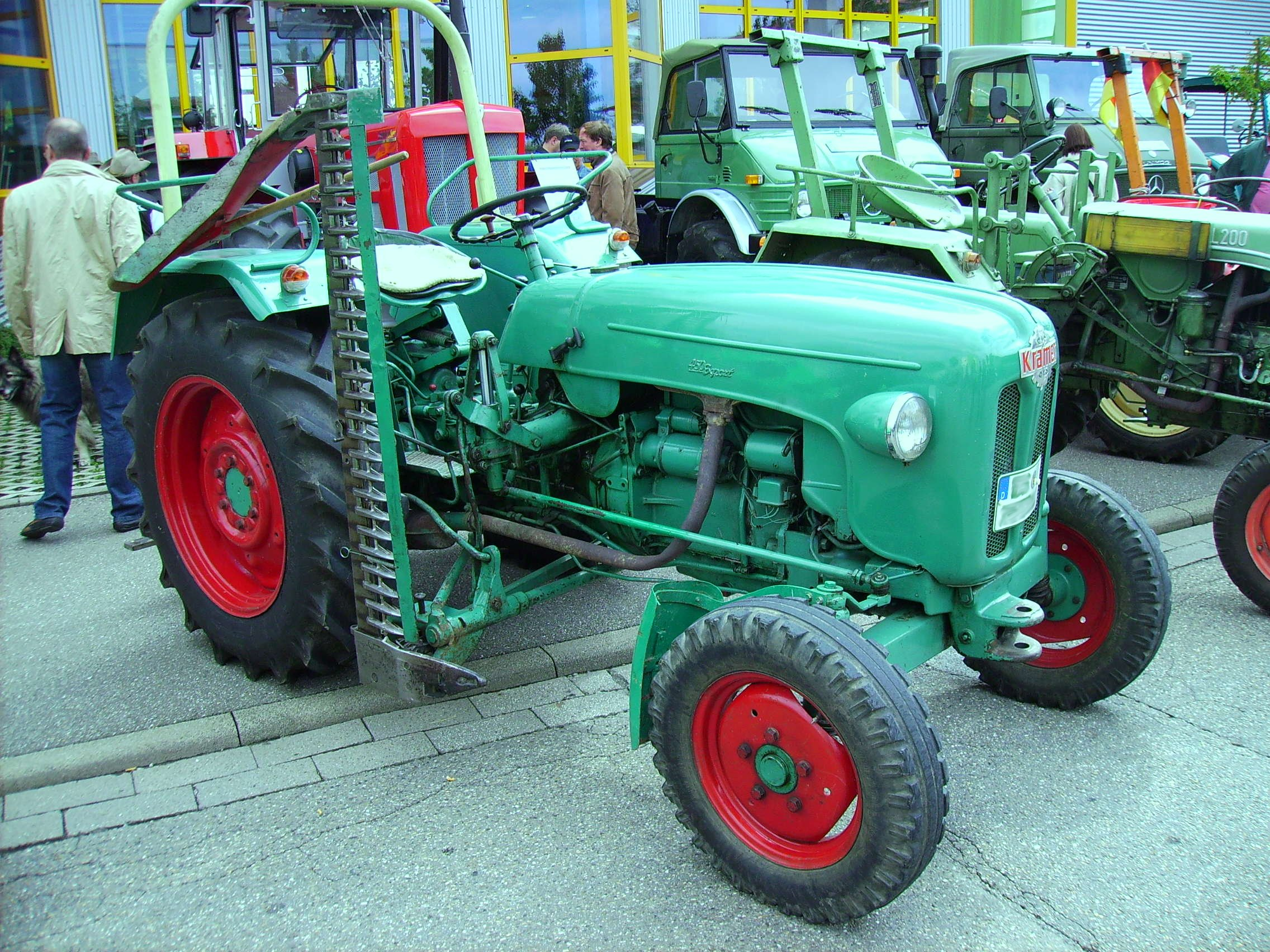
Kramer 450 Export

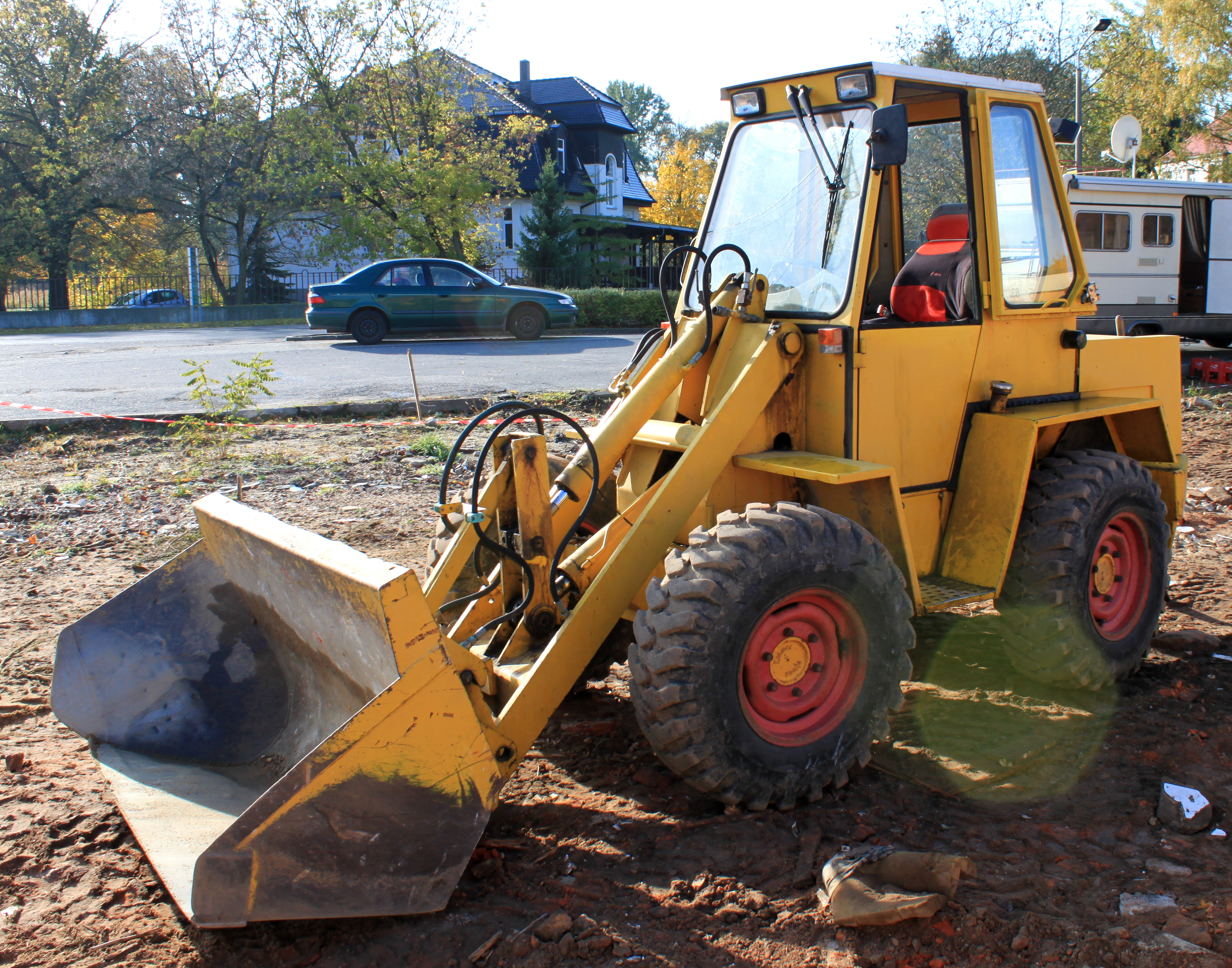
Kramer 312 SL

== Locations ==
- Pfullendorf, Germany (production, administration, research & development)

== Products ==
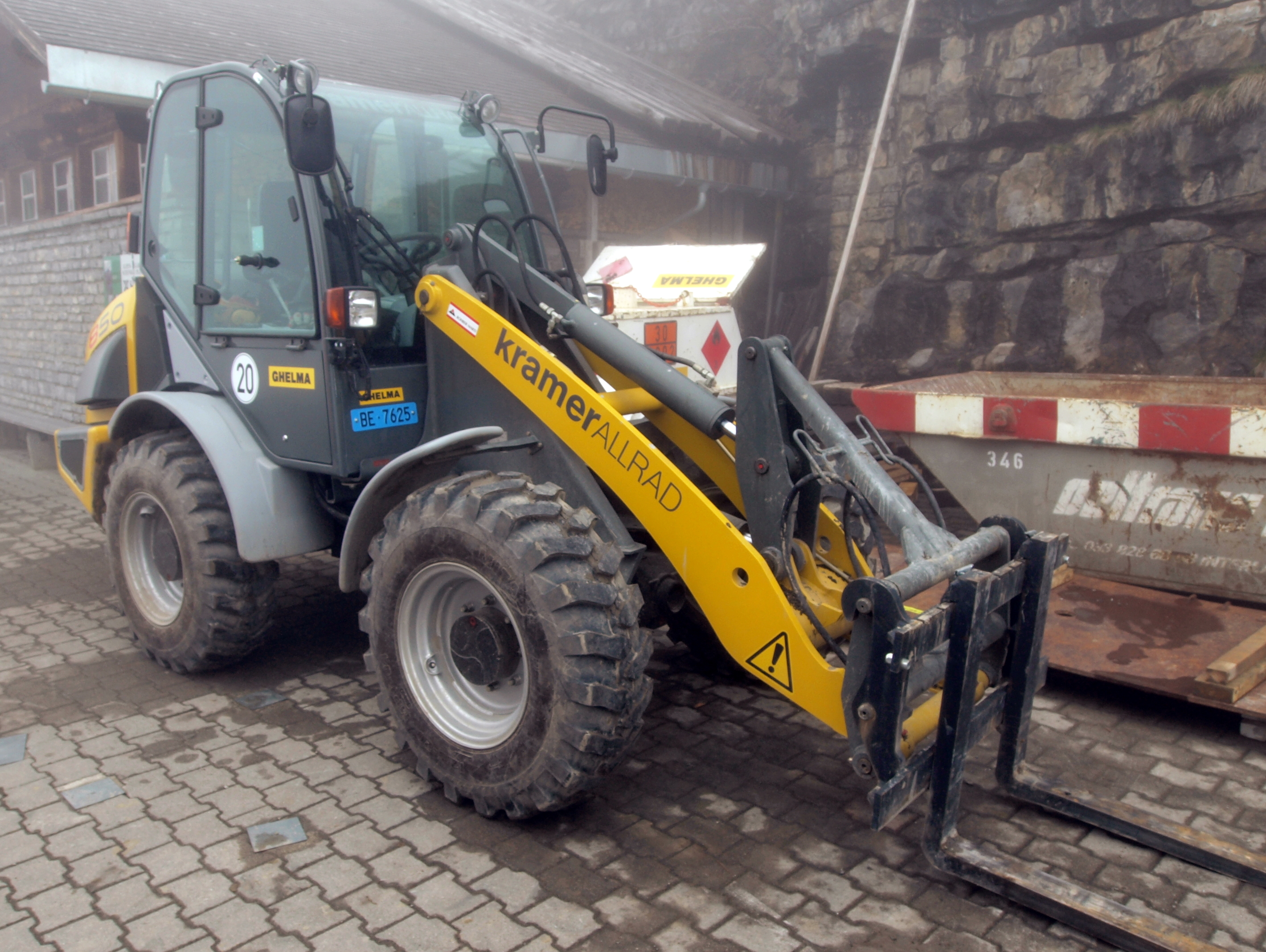
Kramer Allrad 850 wheel loader

- Wheel loaders
- Tele wheel loaders
- Telehandlers

== Literature ==
- Walter Sack: Kramer Traktoren. Podszun Verlag. März 2006. ISBN 3-86133-410-0
- Agrarvideo: "Kramer. Der Allesschaffer vom Bodensee", Firmen- und Trakorengeschichte auf DVD, http://www.agrarvideo.de/kramer-die-allesschaffer-vom-bodensee.html
