= Tracked loader =

Loader that uses continuous tracks instead of wheels

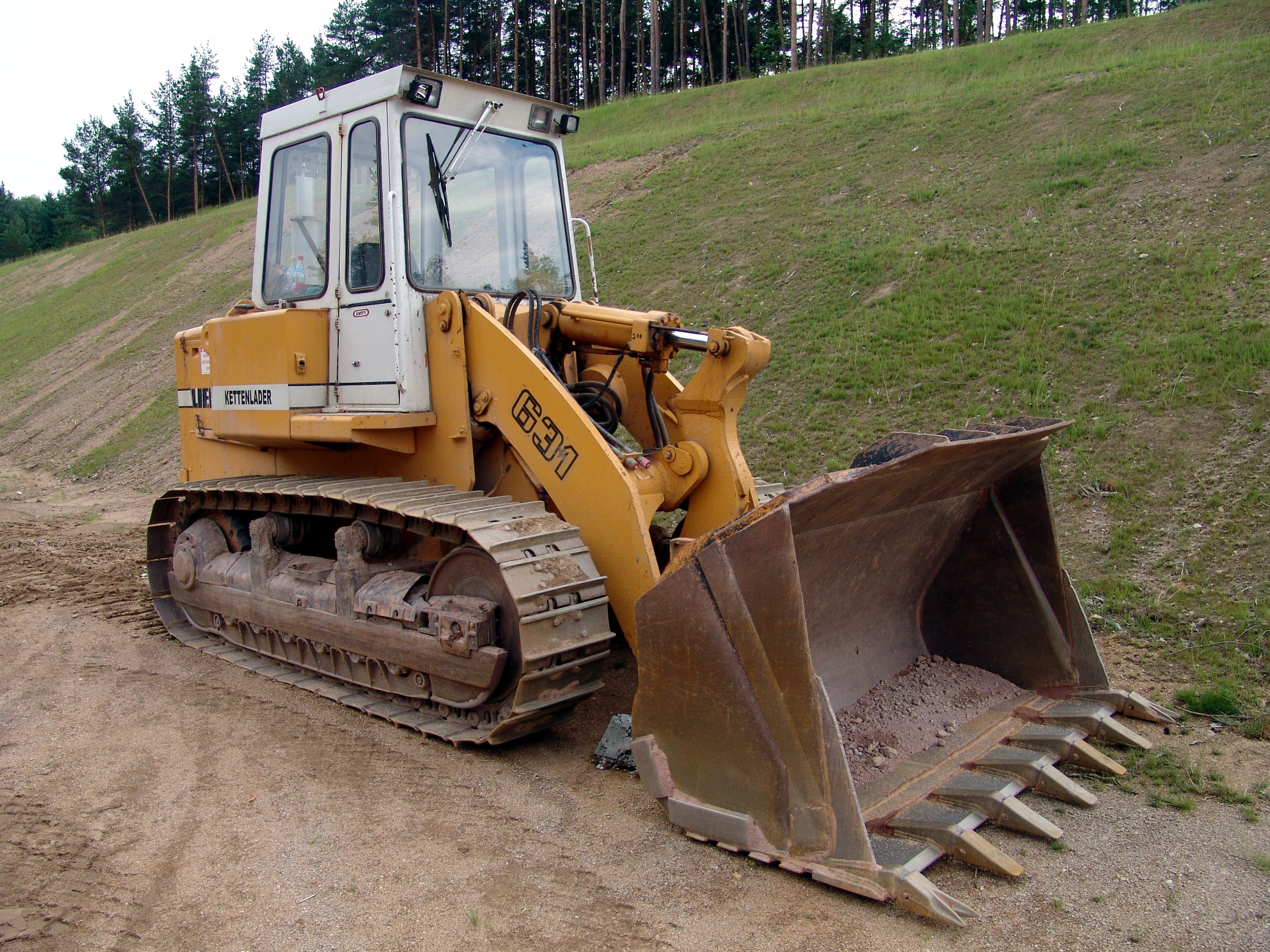
Liebherr 631 tracked loader

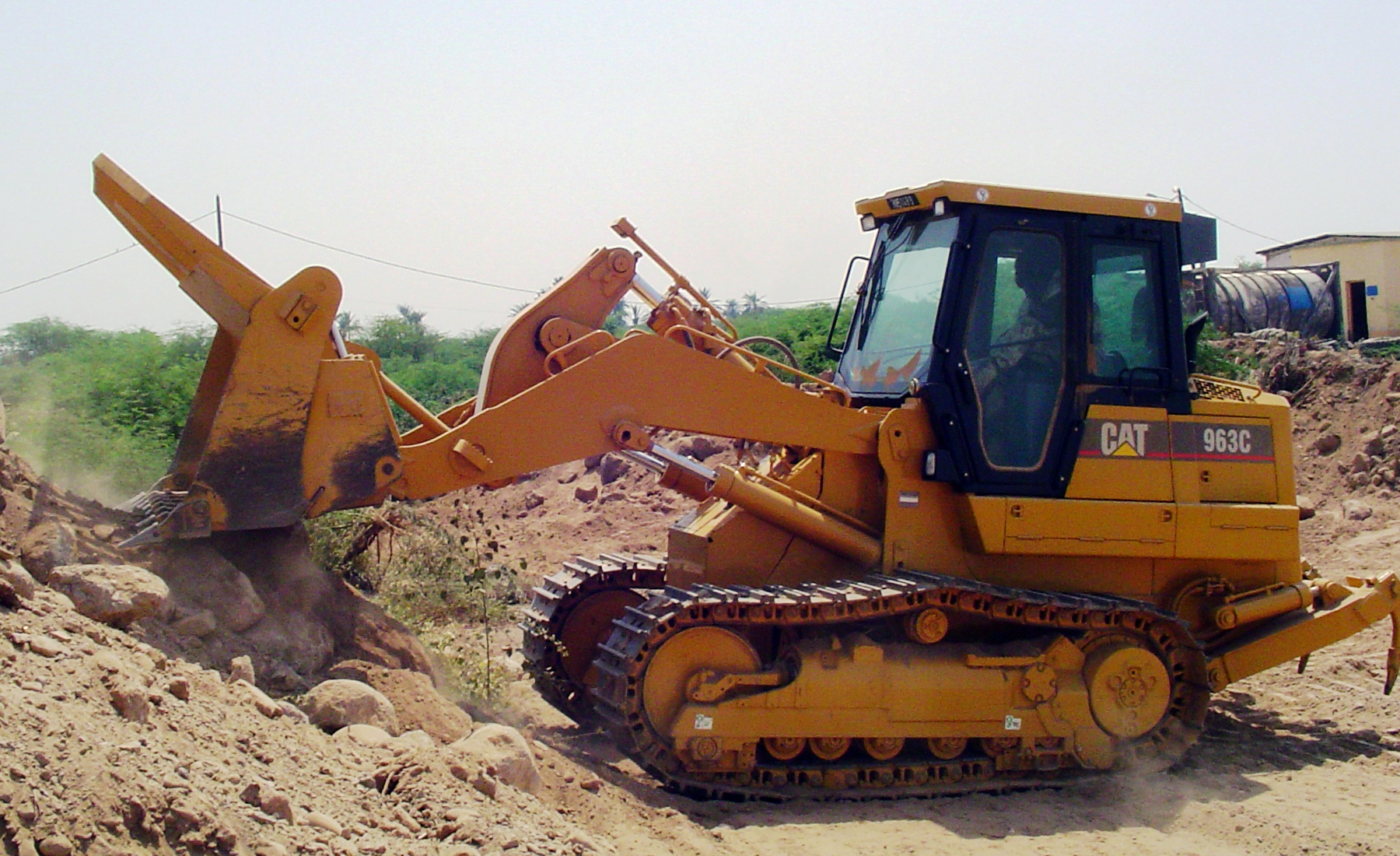
Caterpillar tracked loader in action

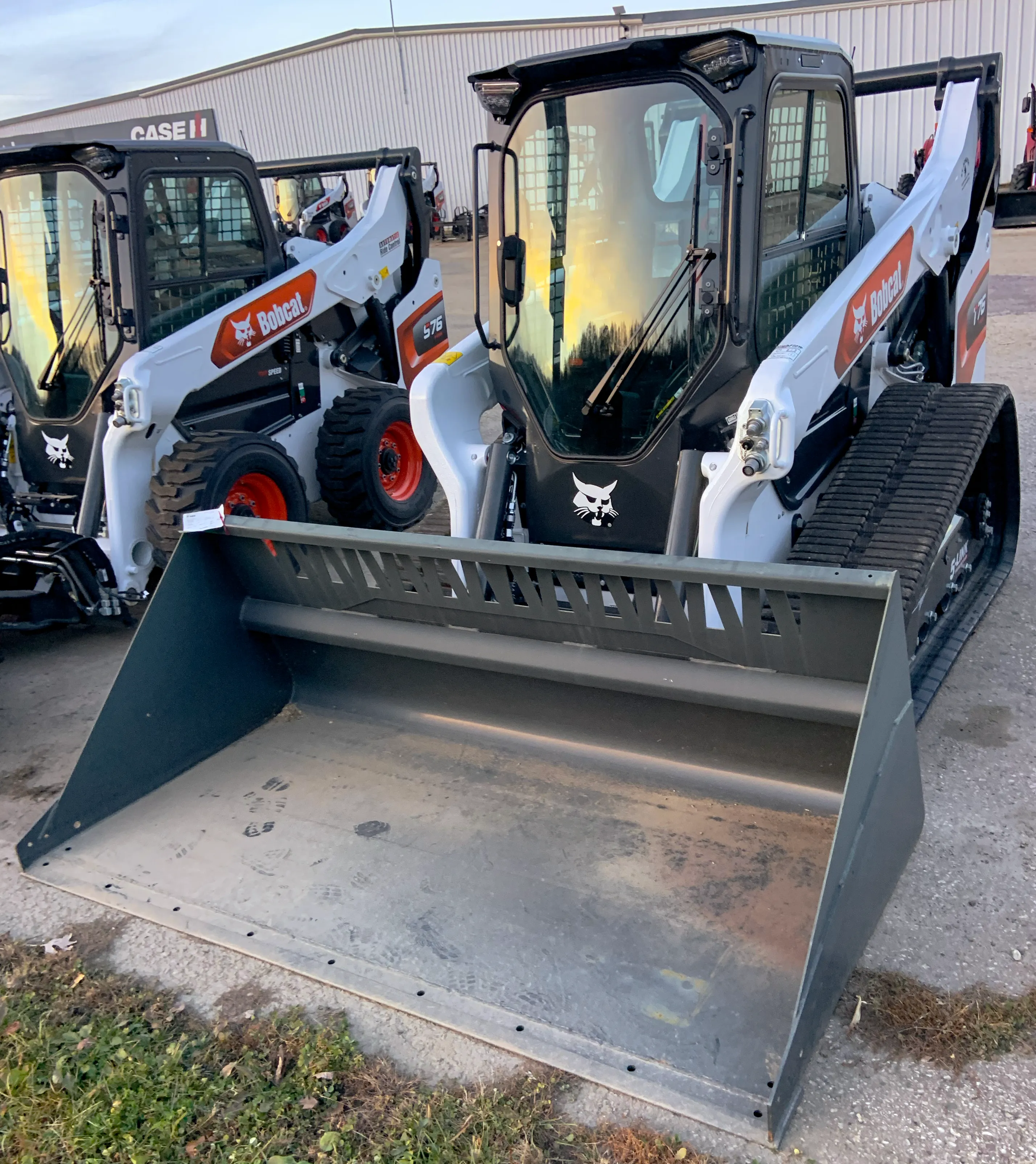
Bobcat tracked loader

A tracked loader or crawler loader is an engineering vehicle consisting of a tracked chassis with a front bucket for digging and loading material. The history of tracked loaders can be defined by three evolutions of their design. Each of these evolutions made the tracked loader a more viable and versatile tool in the excavation industry. These machines are capable in nearly every task, but master of none. A bulldozer, excavator, or wheeled loader will outperform a tracked loader under specific conditions, but the ability of a tracked loader to perform almost every task on a job site is why it remains a part of many companies' fleets.

The first tracked loaders were built from tracked tractors with custom-built loader buckets. The first loaders were cable-operated like the bulldozers of the era. These tracked loaders lacked the ability to dig in hard ground, but so did the bulldozers of the day. They were mostly used for moving stockpiled material and loading trucks and rail cars.

The first major design change to tracked loaders came with the integration of hydraulic systems. Using hydraulics to power the loader linkages increased the power of the loader. More importantly, the loaders could apply down pressure to the bucket, vastly increasing their ability to dig compacted ground. Most of the tracked loaders were still based on a bulldozer equivalent. The weight of the engine was still on the front half of the tracks along with the heavy loader components. This caused many problems with heavy wear of the front idler wheels and the undercarriage in general. The Caterpillar 983 tracked loader, the second largest tracked loader ever built, was notorious for heavy undercarriage wear.

The hydrostatic drive system was the second major innovation to affect the design of tracked loaders.

Tracked loaders have become sophisticated machines, using hydrostatic transmissions and electro-hydraulic controls to increase efficiency. Until the rise in popularity of excavators, tracked loaders had little competition with regard to digging and loading jobs.

== See also ==
- Drott Manufacturing Company
