= Loader (equipment) =

Heavy equipment machine

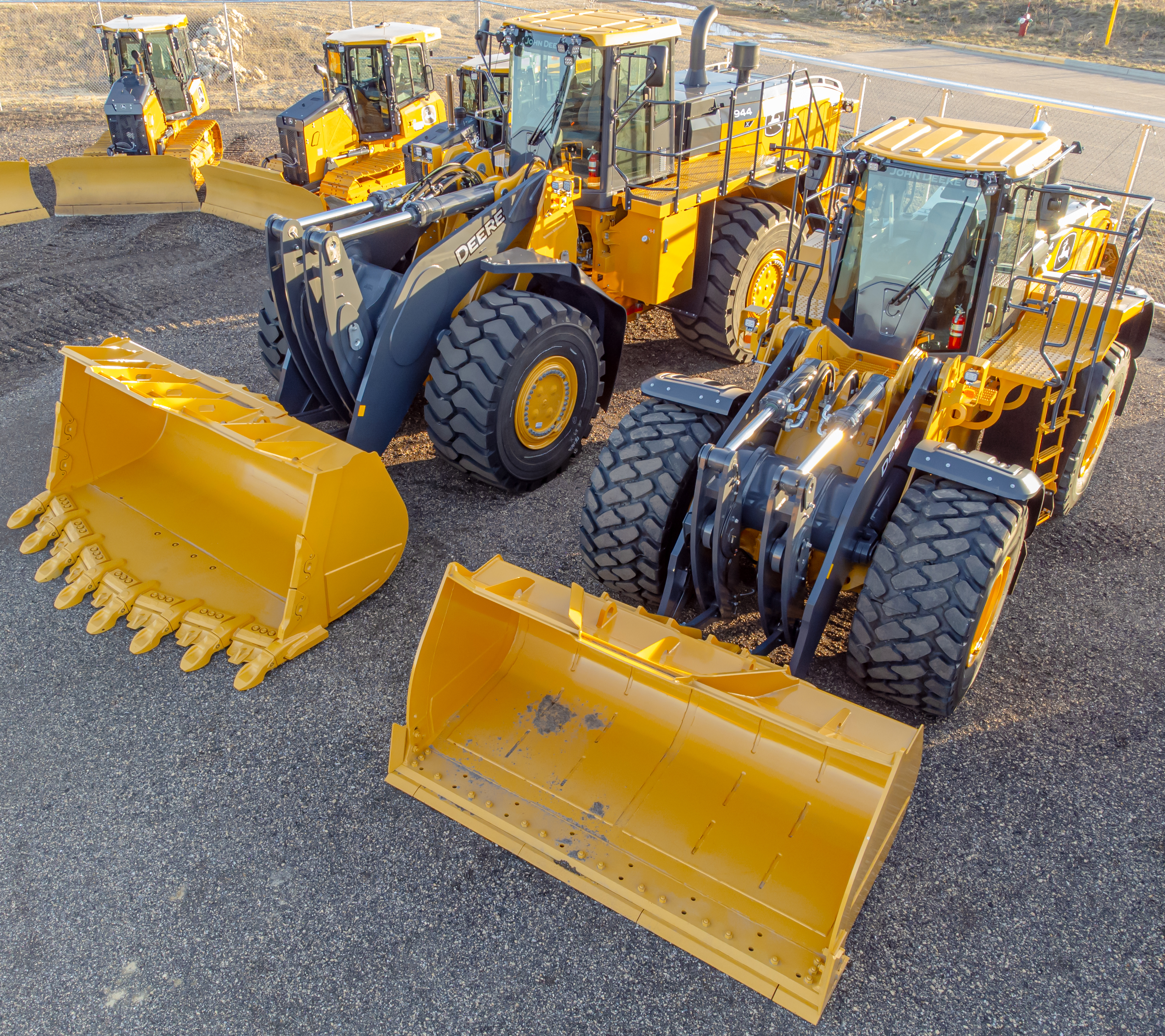
John Deere front-end loaders

CAD model tracing of a tractor mounted loader mechanism

CAD model tracing of a skid loader mechanism

A loader is a heavy equipment machine used in construction to move or load materials such as soil, rock, sand, demolition debris, etc. into or onto another type of machinery (such as a dump truck, conveyor belt, feed-hopper, or railroad car).

There are many types of loader, which, depending on design and application, are variously called a bucket loader, end loader, front loader, front-end loader, payloader, high lift, scoop, shovel dozer, skid-steer, tractor loader or wheel loader.

== Description ==
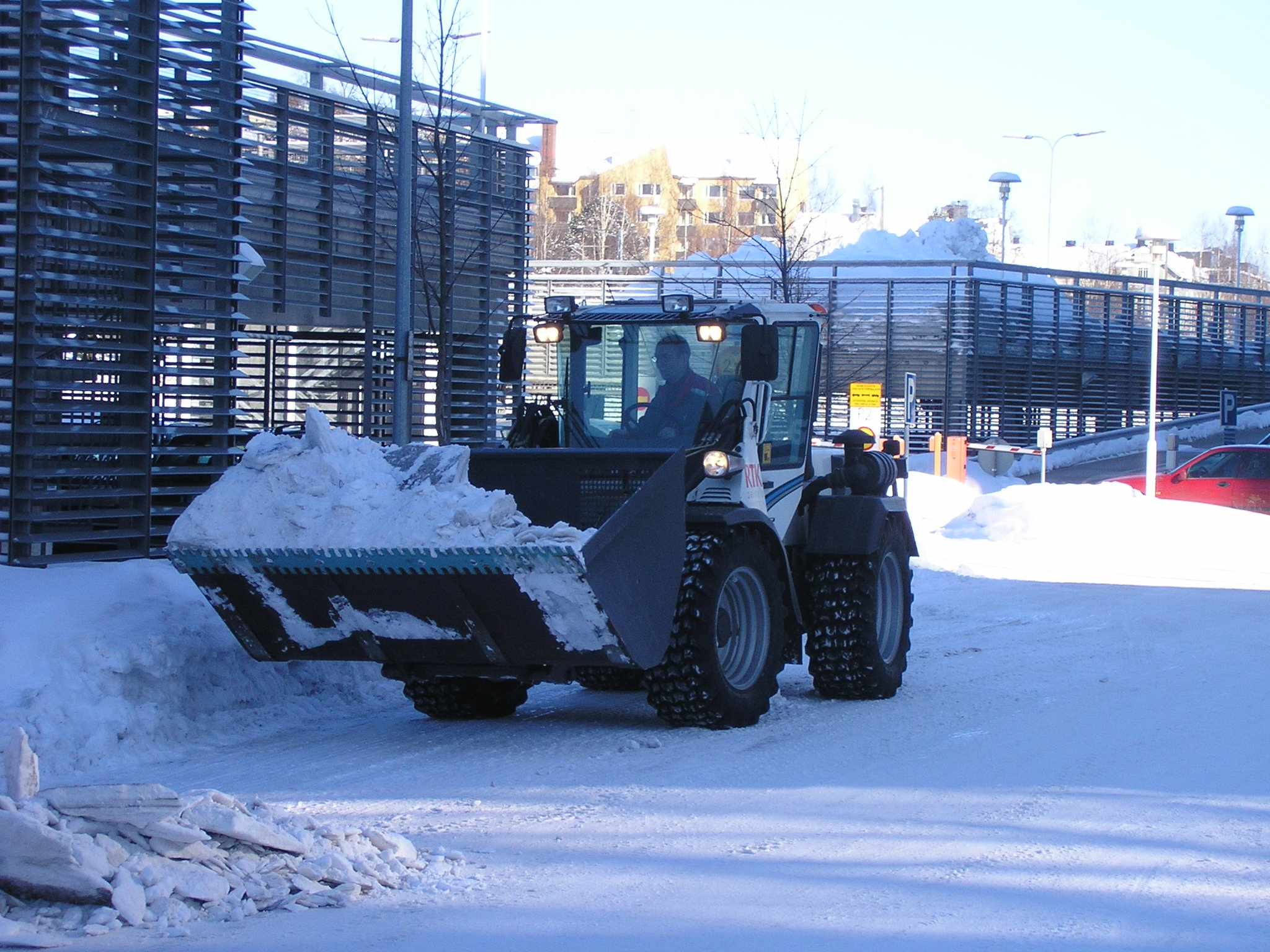
Loader removing snow in Jyväskylä, Finland

A loader is a type of tractor, usually wheeled, sometimes on tracks, that has a front-mounted wide bucket connected to the end of two booms (arms) to scoop up loose material from the ground, such as dirt, sand or gravel, and move it from one place to another without pushing the material across the ground. A loader is commonly used to move a stockpiled material from ground level and deposit it into an awaiting dump truck or into an open trench excavation.

The loader assembly may be a removable attachment or permanently mounted. Often the bucket can be replaced with other devices or tools—for example, many can mount forks to lift heavy pallets or shipping containers, and a hydraulically opening "clamshell" bucket allows a loader to act as a light dozer or scraper. The bucket can also be augmented with devices like a bale grappler for handling large bales of hay or straw.

Large loaders, such as the Kawasaki 95ZV-2, John Deere 844K, ACR 700K Compact Wheel Loader, Caterpillar 950H, Volvo L120E, Case 921E, or Hitachi ZW310 usually have only a front bucket and are called front loaders, whereas small loader tractors are often also equipped with a small backhoe and are called backhoe loaders or loader backhoes or JCBs, after the company that first claimed to have invented them. Small loaders, such as the GEHL or Manitou Skid Steer are suitable to work inside buildings and on high floors. Sometimes, construction happens inside a building or many floors above the ground. Because GEHL or Manitou skid steer loaders have a compact size and are not too heavy, a crane can lift them onto the top floor of a new building. Other companies like CASE in America and Whitlock in the UK had been manufacturing excavator loaders well before JCB.

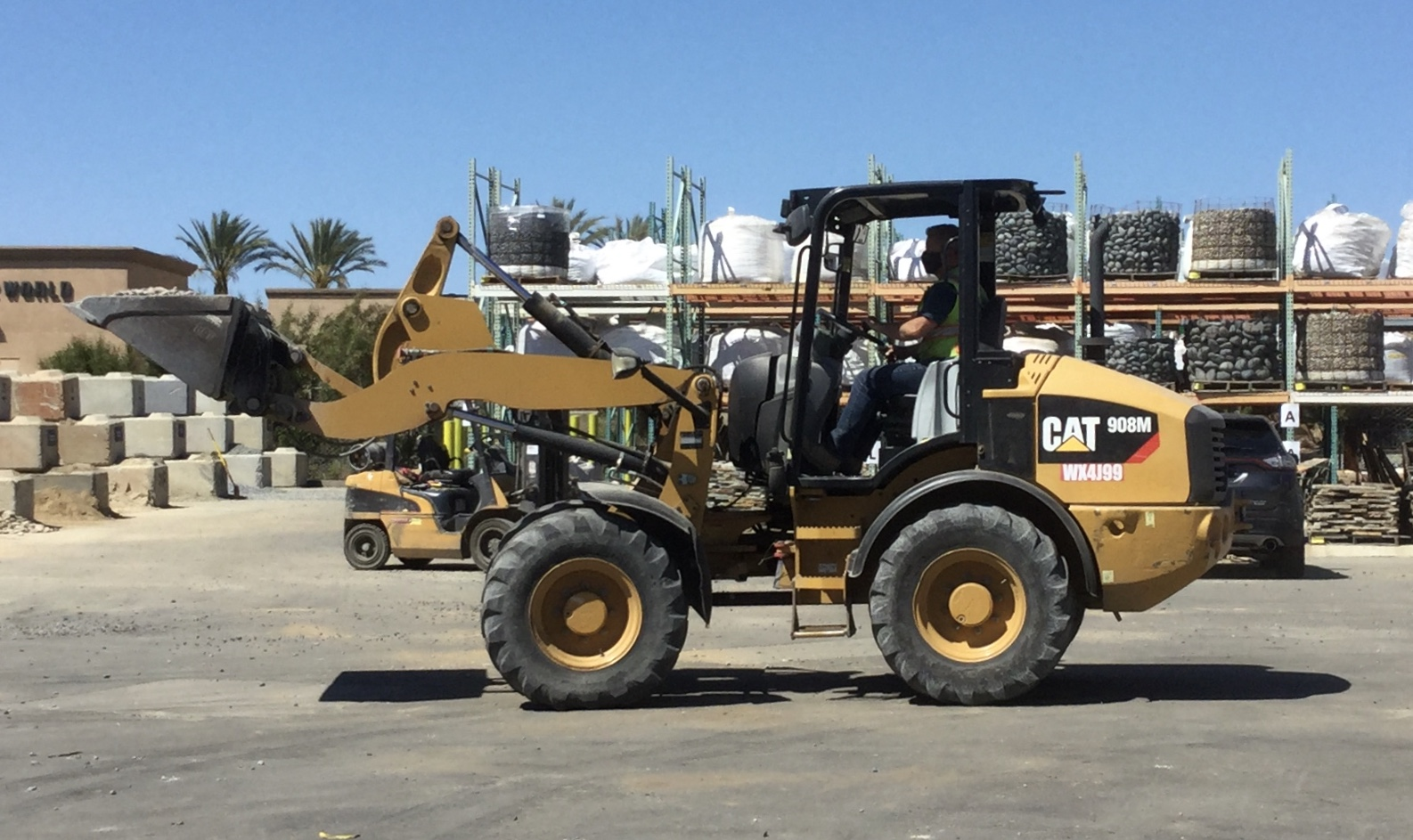
A Cat 908M at a landscape supply store in San Marcos

The largest loader in the world is LeTourneau L-2350. Currently these large loaders are in production in the Longview, Texas facility. The L-2350 uses a diesel-electric propulsion system similar to that used in a locomotive. Each rubber tired wheel is driven by its own independent electric motor.

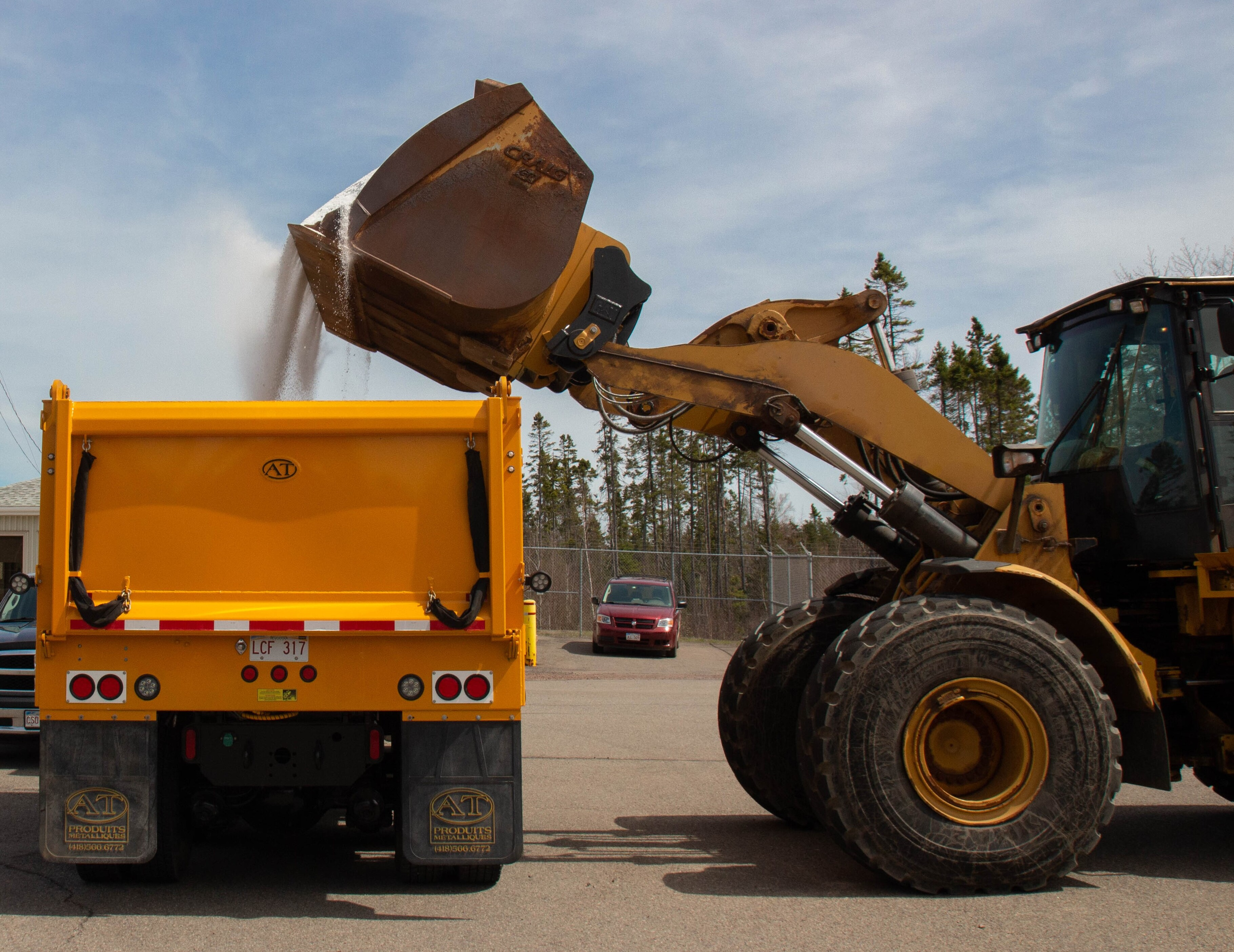
Loader dumping salt into a salt spreader

Loaders are used mainly for loading materials into trucks, laying pipe, clearing rubble, and digging. A loader is not the most efficient machine for digging as it cannot dig very deep below the level of its wheels, like a backhoe or an excavator can. The capacity of a loader bucket can be anywhere from 0.5 to 36 m^{3} depending upon the size of the machine and its application. The front loader's bucket capacity is generally much bigger than a bucket capacity of a backhoe loader.

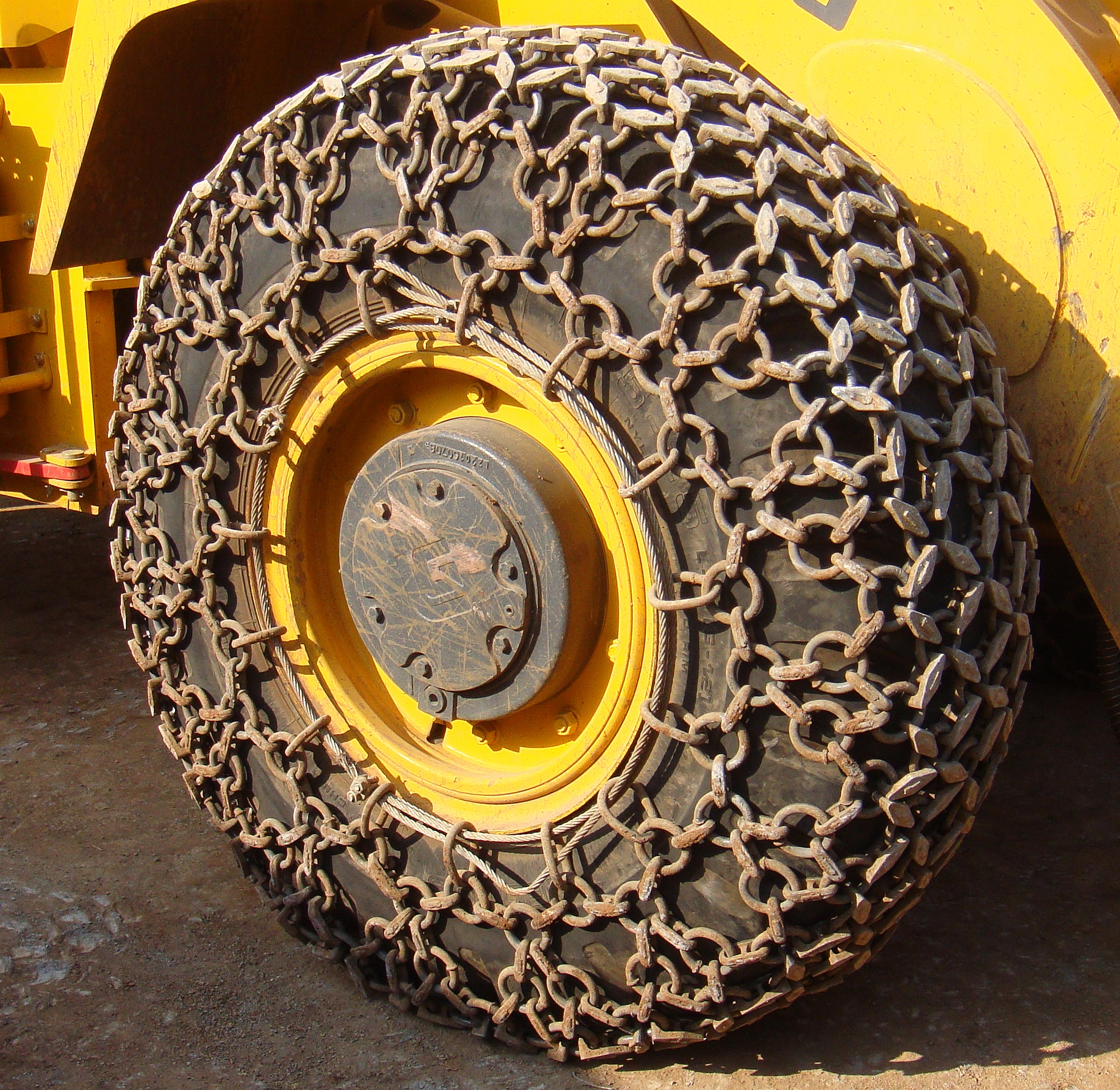
Traction chains on a wheel loader

Unlike most bulldozers, most loaders are wheeled and not tracked, although track loaders are common. They are successful where sharp-edged materials in construction debris would damage rubber wheels, or where the ground is soft and muddy. Wheels provide better mobility and speed and do not damage paved roads as much as tracks, but provide less traction.

In construction areas loaders are also used to transport building materials such as bricks, pipe, metal bars, and digging tools over short distances.

Front-loaders are commonly used to remove snow especially from sidewalks, parking lots, and other areas too small for using snowplows and other heavy equipment. They are sometimes used as snowplows with a snowplow attachment but commonly have a bucket or snow basket, which can also be used to load snow into the rear compartment of a snowplow or dump truck.

High-tip buckets are suitable for light materials such as chip, peat and light gravel and when the bucket is emptied from a height.

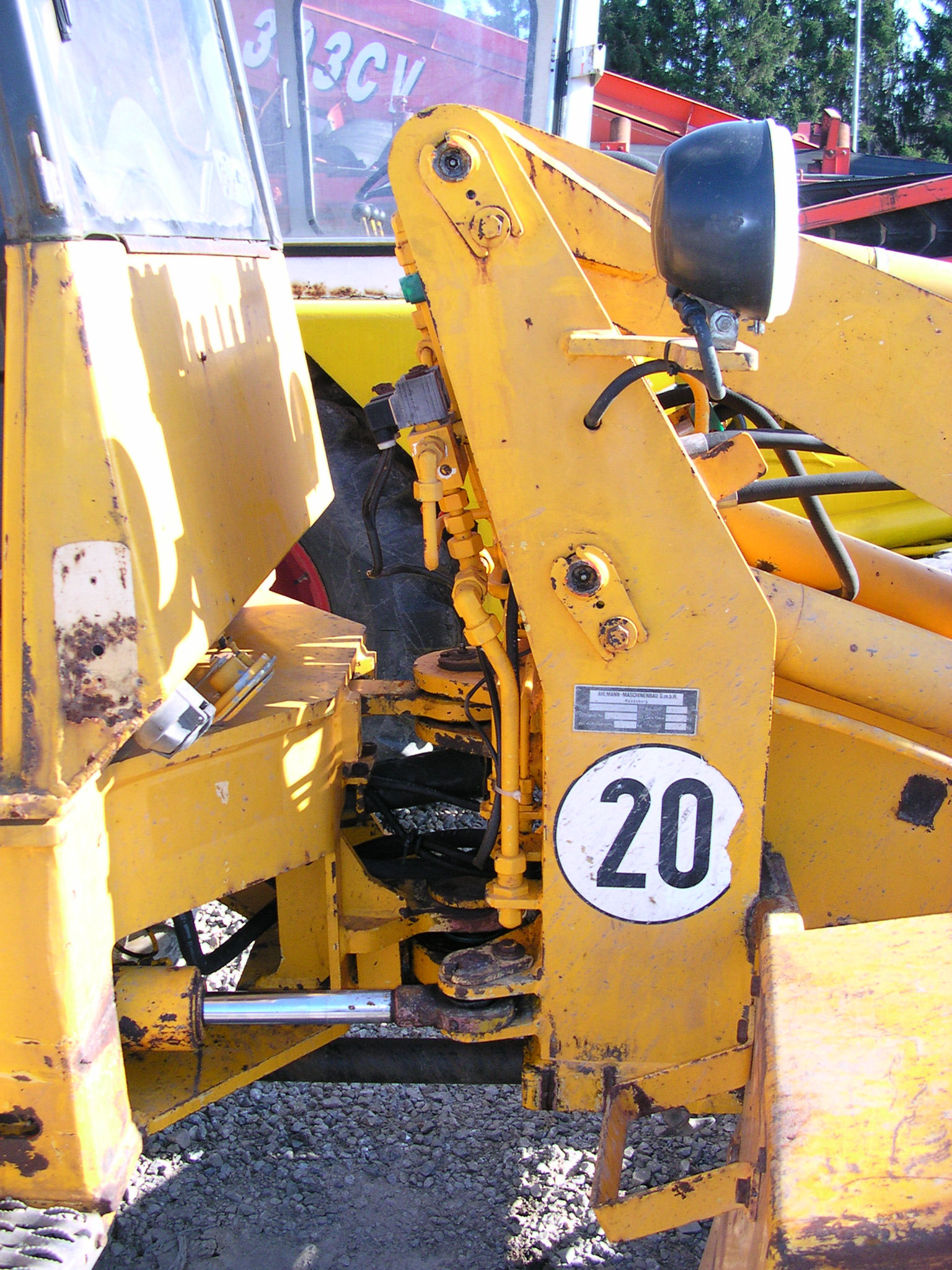
Close-up of articulated steering apparatus

Unlike backhoes or standard tractors fitted with a front bucket, many large loaders do not use automotive steering mechanisms. Instead, they steer by a hydraulically actuated pivot point set exactly between the front and rear axles. This is referred to as "articulated steering" and allows the front axle to be solid, allowing it to carry greater weight. Articulated steering provides better maneuverability for a given wheelbase. Since the front wheels and attachment rotate on the same axis, the operator is able to "steer" his load in an arc after positioning the machine, which can be useful. The tradeoff is that when the machine is "twisted" to one side and a heavy load is lifted high, it has a greater risk of turning over to the "wide" side.

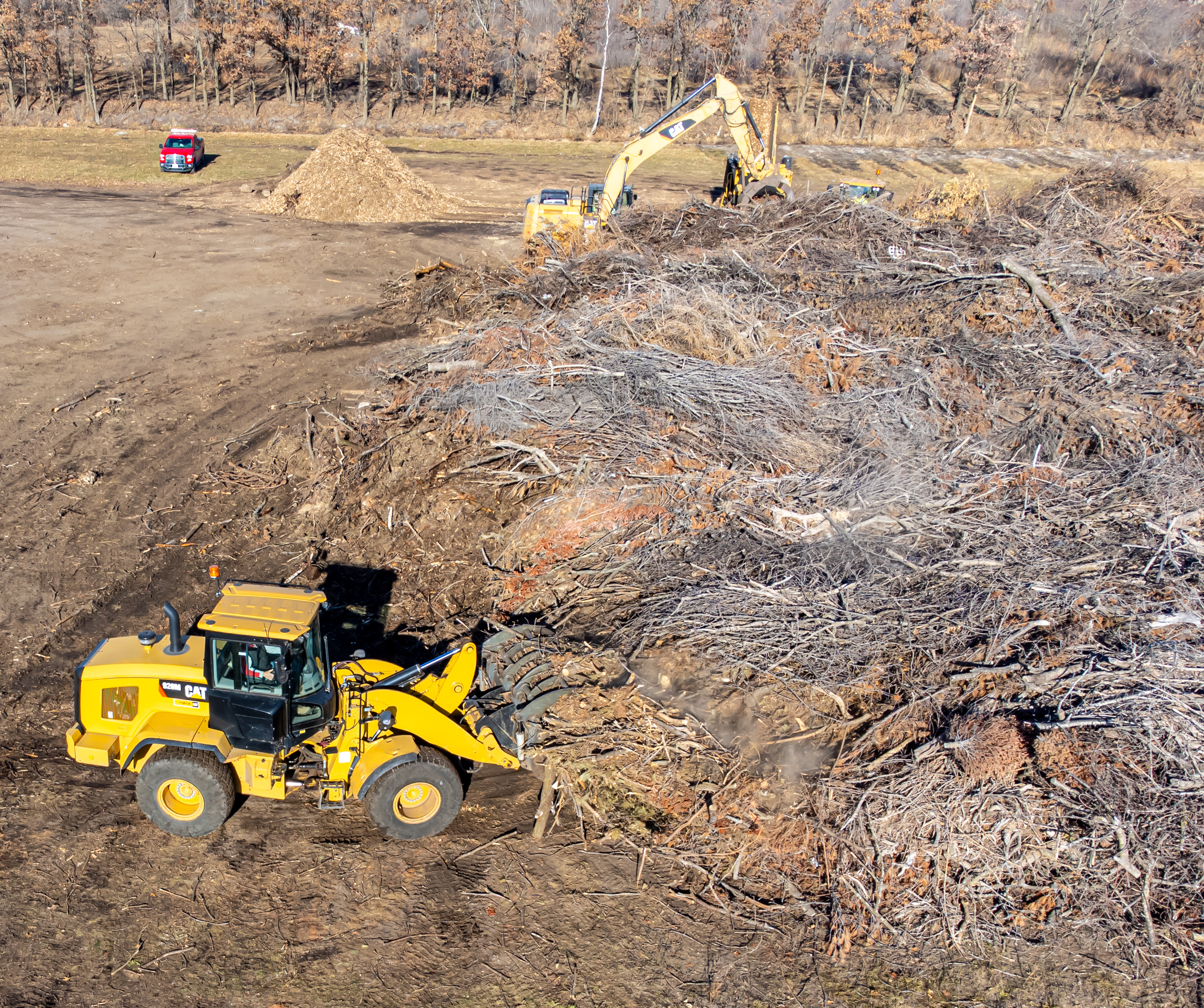
Front-end loader grapple

Front loaders gained popularity during the last two decades, especially in urban engineering projects and small earthmoving works. Heavy equipment manufacturers offer a wide range of loader sizes and duties.

The term "loader" is also used in the debris removal field to describe the boom on a grapple truck.

== Major components ==
The major components included in a loader are the engine (diesel in almost all cases), the hydraulic components (such as pumps, motors and valves) and the transmission components (gearbox, axles, wheels/tracks, pumps, motors, etc.). The engine runs both the hydraulics and the transmission, and these in turn move the front attachment (a bucket, forks, sweeper, etc.) to manipulate the material being handled, and the wheels or tracks to move the machine around the jobsite.

== Wheel loaders ==
The first wheel loader was invented by Frank G. Hough in 1939, it was called the Payloader. This machine consisted of a vertical mast affixed to the front of a tractor with a pair of loader arms running from the back of the machine ending in a forwards bucket, with the main lifting mechanism being driven a cable tensioned via vertically lifting hydraulic cylinder located inside the mast. Today wheel loaders are articulated, a design choice introduced in 1953 via Mixermobile's Scoopmobile series of wheel loaders. This articulation allows them both a superior turning radius and the ability to move the bucket in a small horizontal arc without having to move forward like a conventionally steering chassis.

=== Armored wheel loaders ===
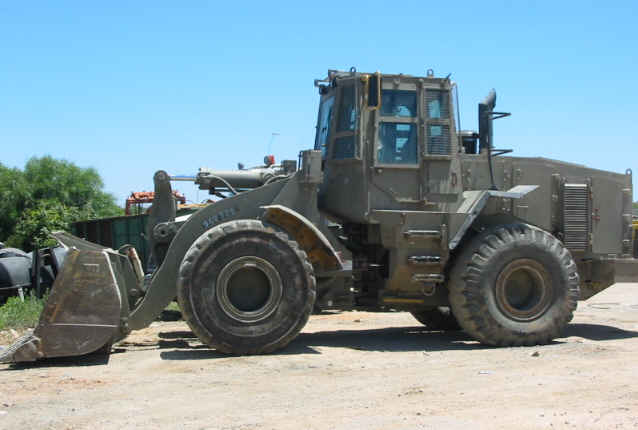
Armored wheel loader of the Israeli Defense Forces

The Israeli Combat Engineering Corps uses armored wheel loaders for construction and combat engineering missions in militarily occupied territories such as the West Bank. They are often seen building or removing road blocks and building bases and fortifications. Since 2005, they have also been used to demolish small houses. The Israel Defense Forces added armor plating to the loader to protect it against rocks, stones, molotov cocktails, and light gunfire.

Rio de Janeiro's police elite squad Batalhão de Operações Policiais Especiais (BOPE) has acquired one wheel loader designed for military use to open routes and make way for the police in Rio de Janeiro's slums, which are controlled, and blocked, by drug dealers.

Several if not most countries have similar equipment. The Dutch armed forces for instance use models like the Werklust WG18Edef, which weighs 15 tons, 2 more than the corresponding unarmored civilian model. In addition, the Dutch military previously used extra armor modules covering most of the window surface with steel for extra protection. These were however not popular with the crews due to low visibility.

The Turkish Army and Turkish Police used remote controlled armored wheel loader Tosun during the building of the Syria–Turkey barrier, the Operation Euphrates Shield, Operation Idlib Shield) and Operation Olive Branch.

People's Armed Police Transportation Detachments operate wheel loaders for search and rescue along if

== Tractor front loaders ==
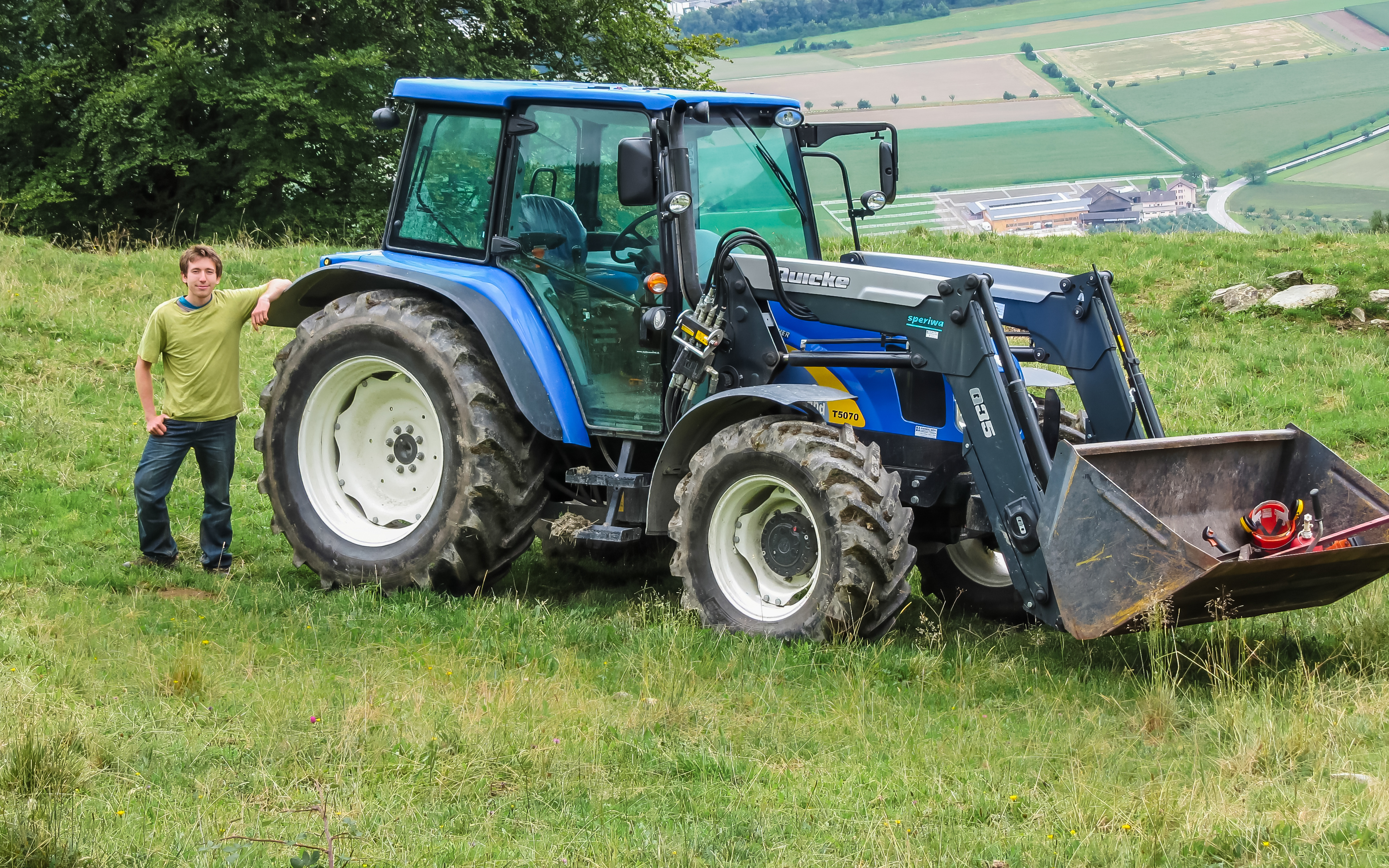
A New Holland T5070 tractor with a Quicke Q35 front-loader attachment in Switzerland

These loaders are a popular addition to tractors from 40 to 150 kW (50 to 200 hp). Its current 'drive-in' form was originally designed and developed in 1958 by a Swedish company named Ålö when they launched their Quicke loader. Tractor loaders were developed to perform a multitude of farming tasks, and are popular due to their relatively low cost (compared to Telehandler) and high versatility. Tractor loaders can be fitted with many attachments such as hydraulic grabs and spikes to assist with bale and silage handling, forks for pallet work, and buckets for more general farm activities. Industrial tractor loaders equipped with box graders are marketed to contractors as skip loaders.

== Compact front-end loaders ==
Abram Dietrich Thiessen of Eyebrow Saskatchewan in the 1940s built the first quick attach front-end loader.

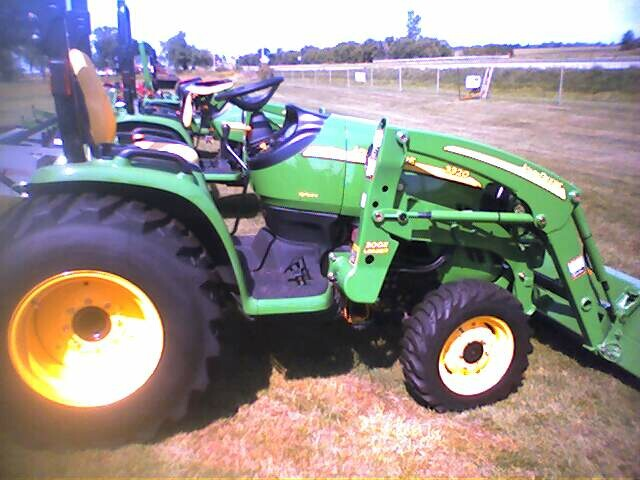
Semi-curved compact loader on a John Deere compact utility tractor

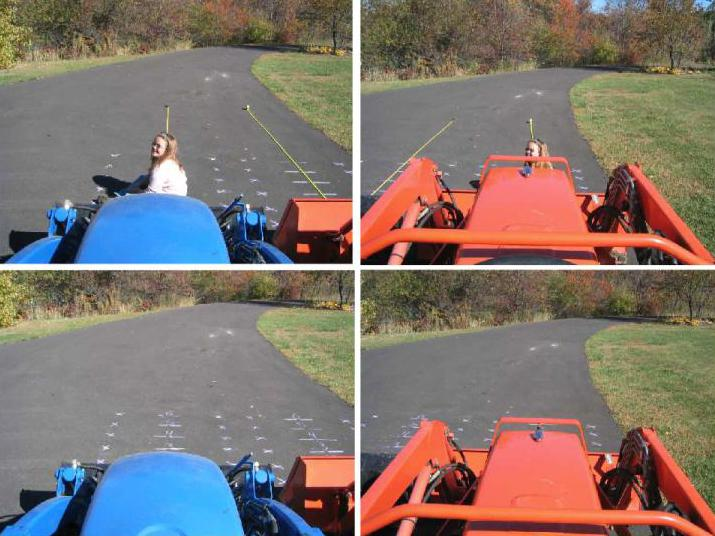
Visibility comparison of different loader designs

Front-end loaders (FELs) are popular additions to compact utility tractors and farm tractors. Compact utility tractors, also called CUTs, are small tractors, typically with 10 to 40 kW (18 to 50 hp) and used primarily for grounds maintenance and landscape chores. There are 2 primary designs of compact tractor FELs, the traditional dogleg designed style and the curved arm style.

John Deere manufactures a semi-curved loader design that does not feature the one piece curved arm, but also is not of the traditional two piece design. New Holland introduced a compact loader with a one piece curved arm on its compact utility tractors, similar one piece curved arm loaders are now available on compact tractors on many brands including Case IH/Farmall, and some Montana and Kioti tractors. Kubota markets traditional loader designs on most of its compact tractors but now features a semi-curved loader design similar to the John Deere loader design on several of its small tractors.

While the front-end loaders on CUT size tractors are capable of many tasks, given their relatively small size and low capacities when compared to commercial loaders, the compact loaders can be made more useful with some simple options. A toothbar is commonly added to the front edge of a loader bucket to aid with digging. Some loaders are equipped with a quick coupler, otherwise known as a quick attach (QA) system. The QA system allows the bucket to be removed easily and other tools to be added in its place. Common additions include a set of pallet forks for lifting pallets of goods or a bale spear for lifting hay bales.

LHD (Load, Haul, Dump machine) is also a front-end loader but meant to be used for mine compact conditions, can handle various range of loads with varying size of buckets, and can be driven with electric motors as well as diesel engines.

== Skid loaders and track loaders ==
A skid loader is a small loader utilizing four wheels with hydraulic drive that directs power to either, or both, sides of the vehicle. Very similar in appearance and design is the track loader, which utilizes a continuous track on either side of the vehicle instead of the wheels. Since the expiration of Bobcat's patent on its quick-connect system, newer tractor models are standardizing that popular format for front-end attachments.

== Swingloaders ==
A swingloader is a rigid frame loader with a swinging boom. The Swingloader was invented in 1953 by German manufacturer Ahlmann with the AR1 model. The boom can swing 180 degrees or more. The loader is able to lift on all sides and dump off on all sides. Swingloaders are often used by the railroad industry to lay rail. Like other loaders many attachments can be attached to the boom such as magnets, forks, and buckets. Smaller swingloaders can be used in farming applications for loading out. A swinging boom is advantageous where space is limited as stability, mobility and space management are greatly increased over their articulated counterparts.

== Gallery ==
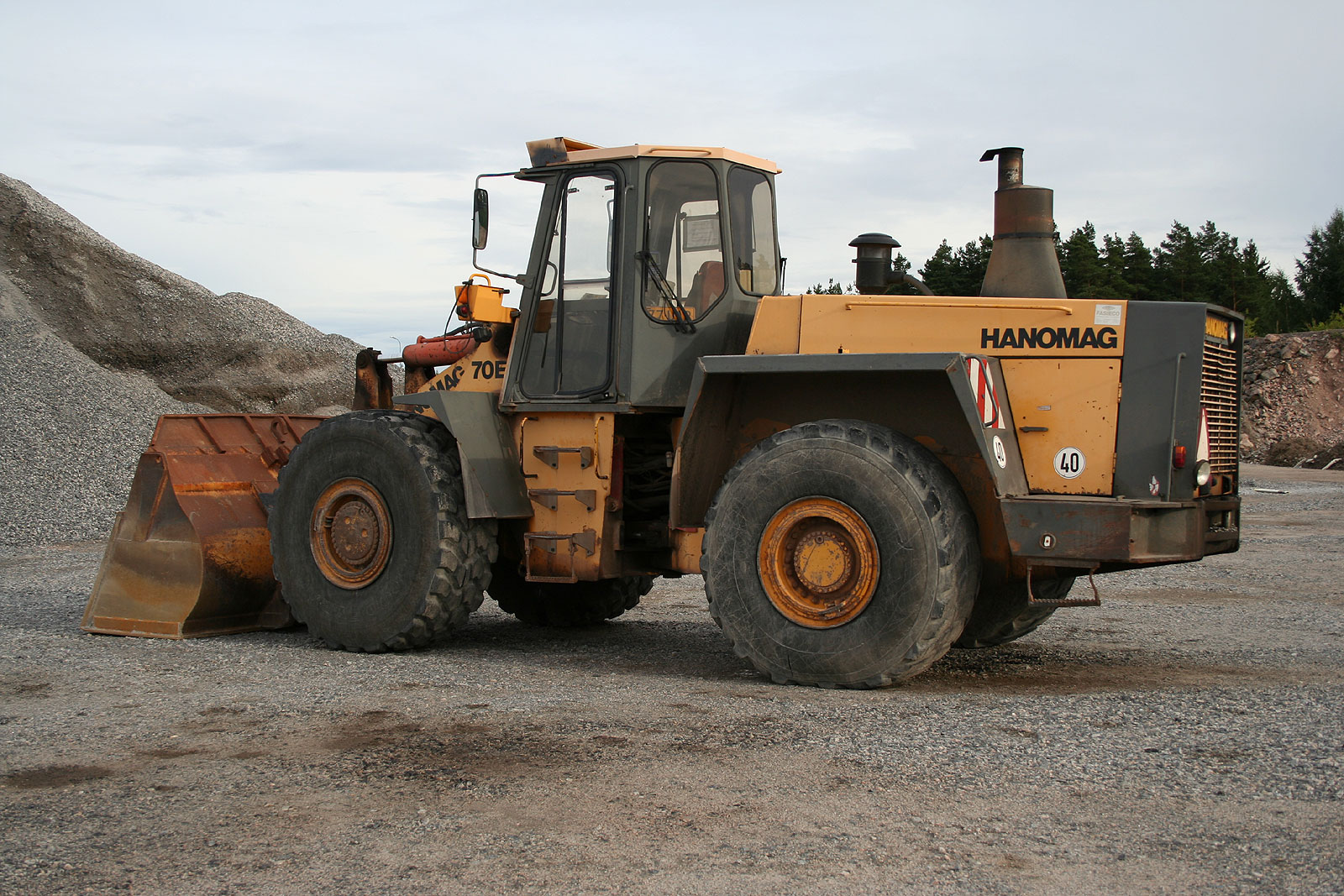
A Hanomag loader

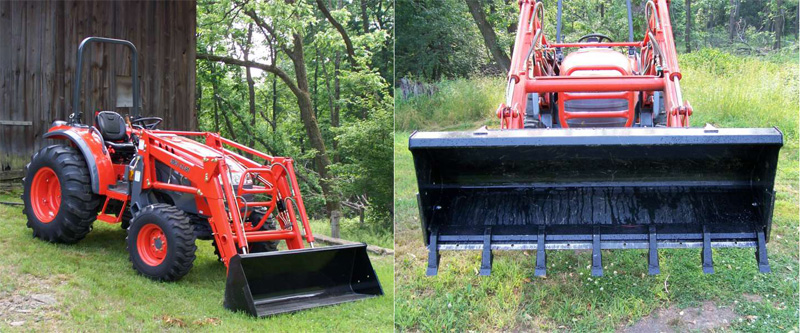
DK45 with and without a toothbar on the bucket

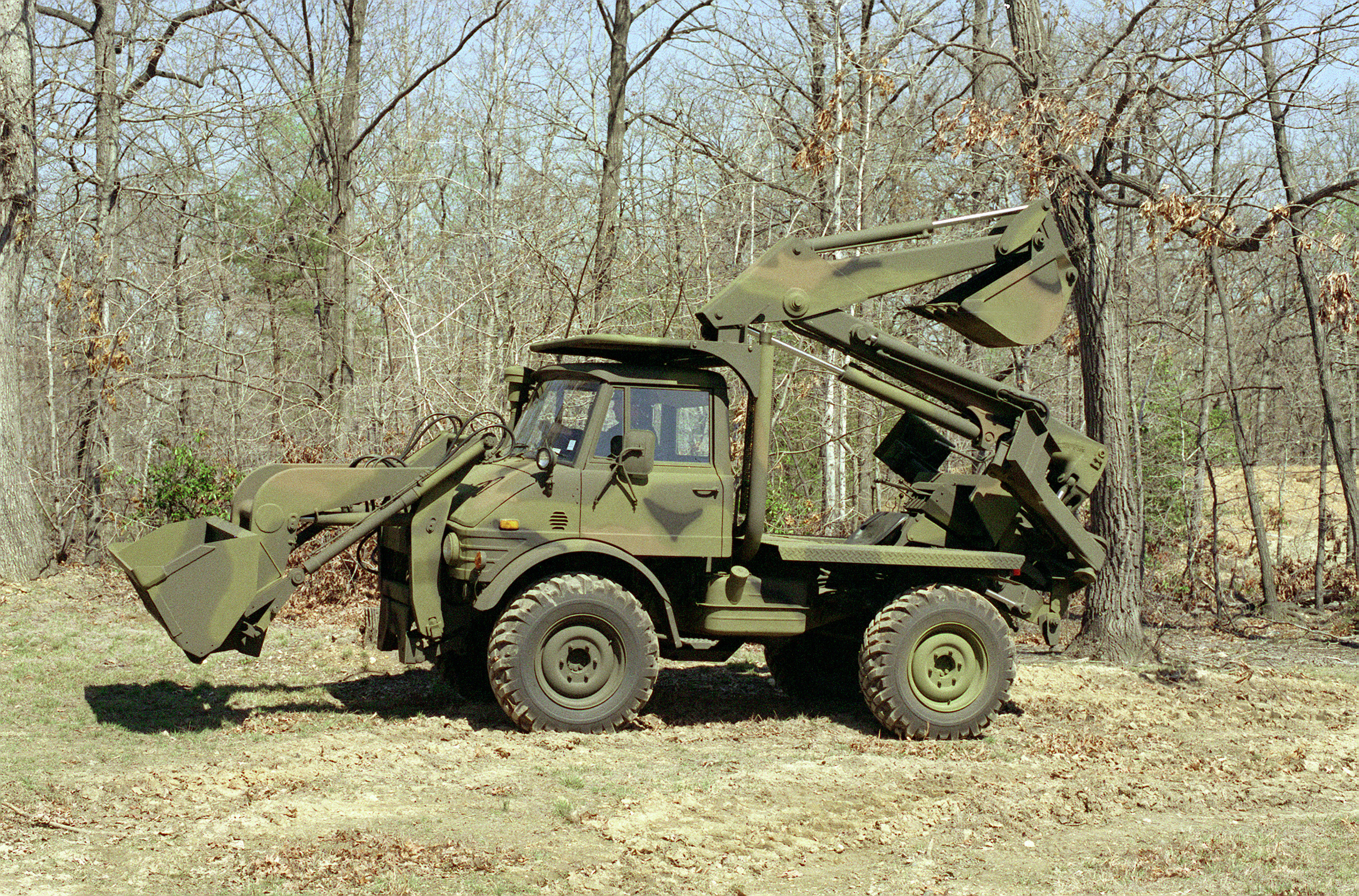
UNIMOG with front loader and excavator attachment (backhoe loader)

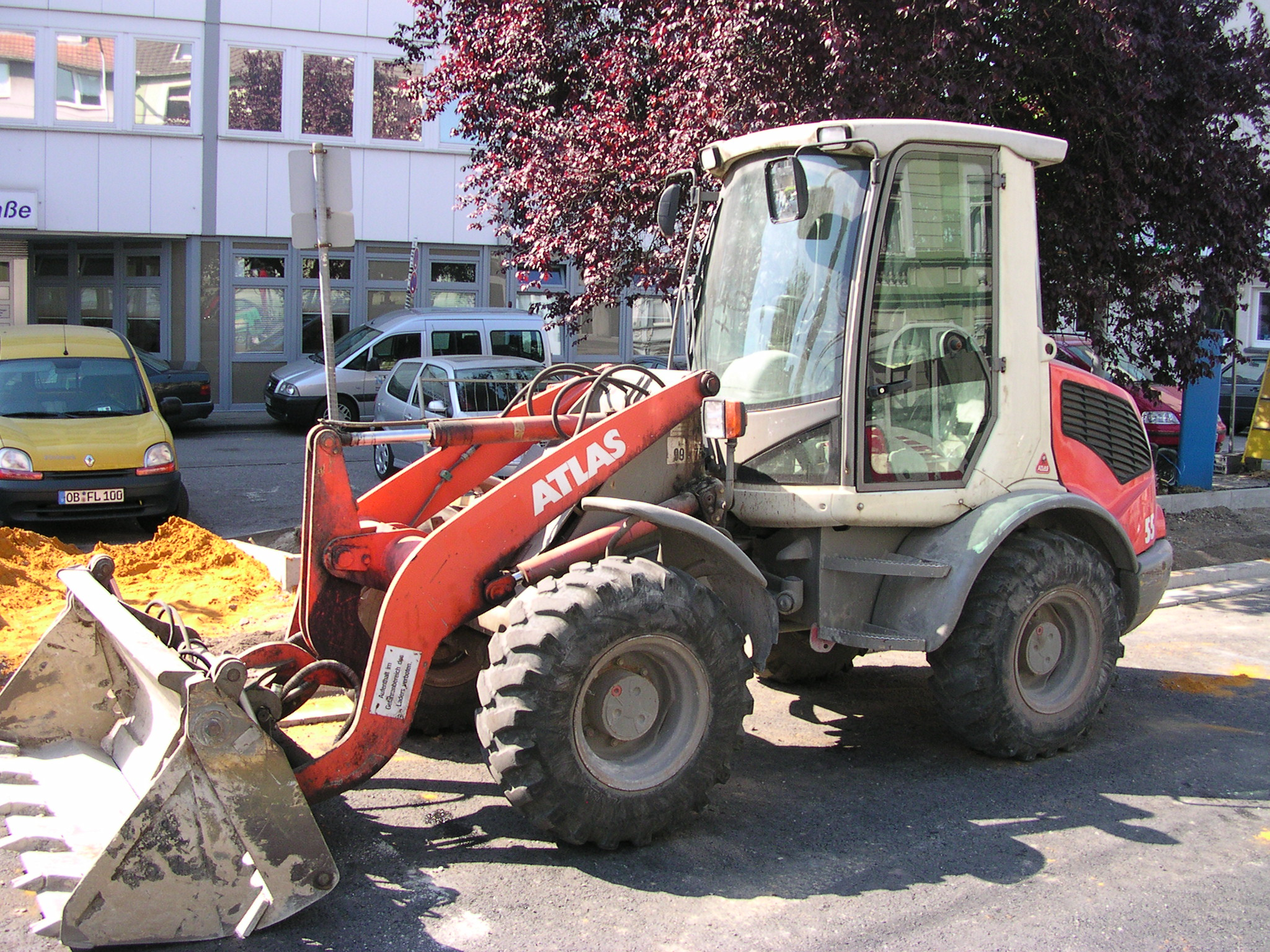
A relatively small front loader

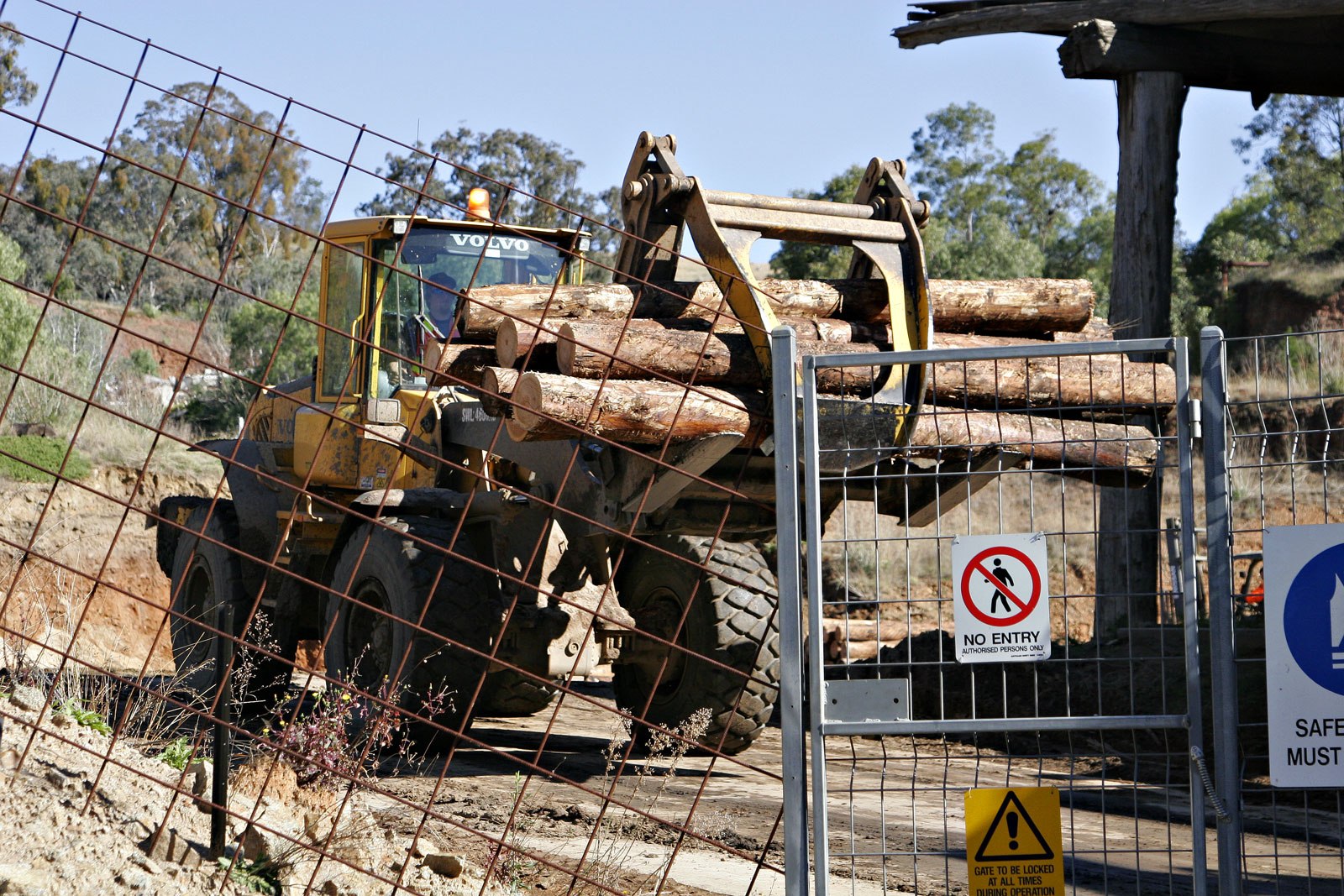
A loader with a specialized claw used to move logs at a sawmill

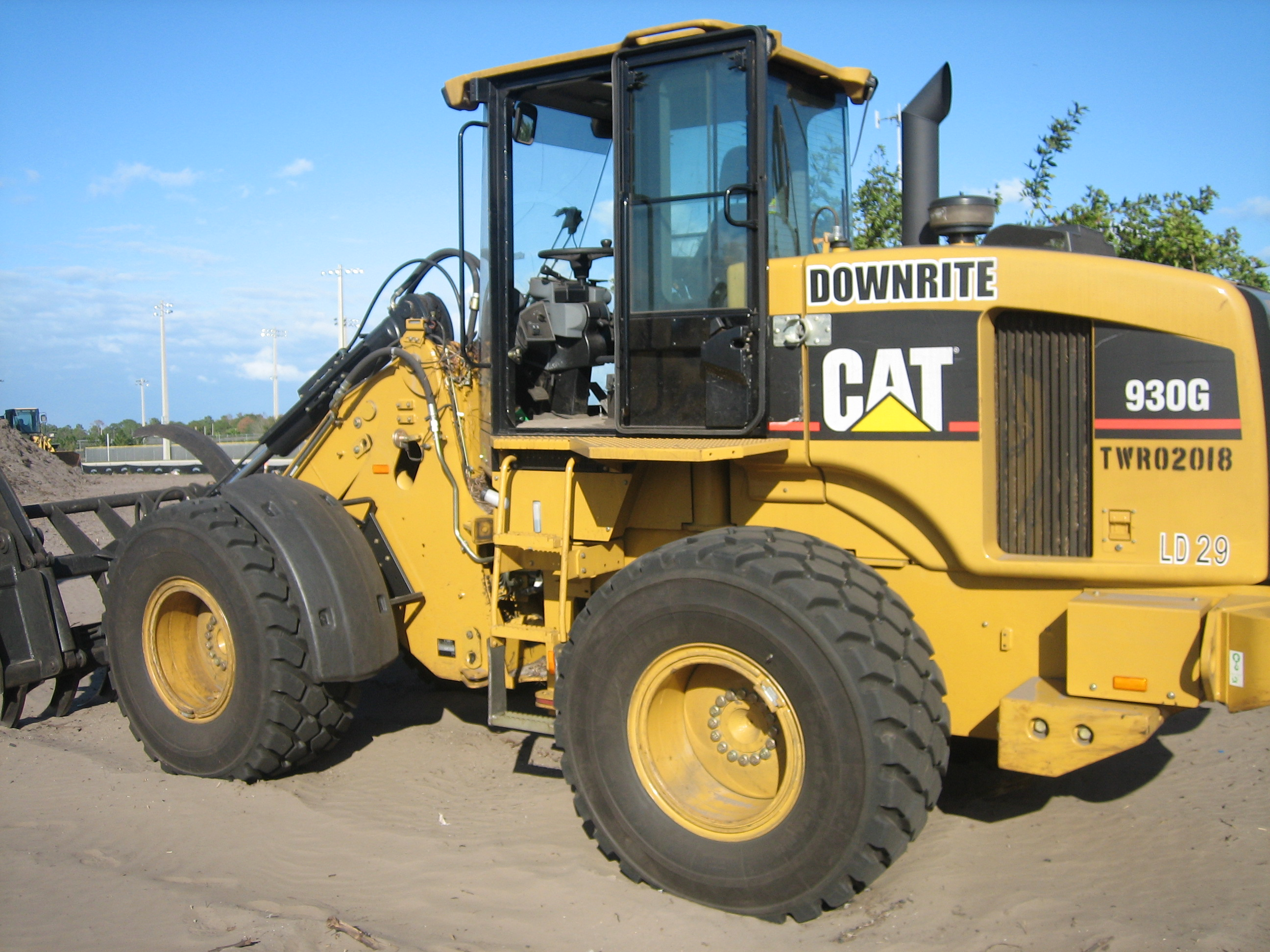
A Caterpillar 930G fitted with a loader rake on a residential construction site in South Florida

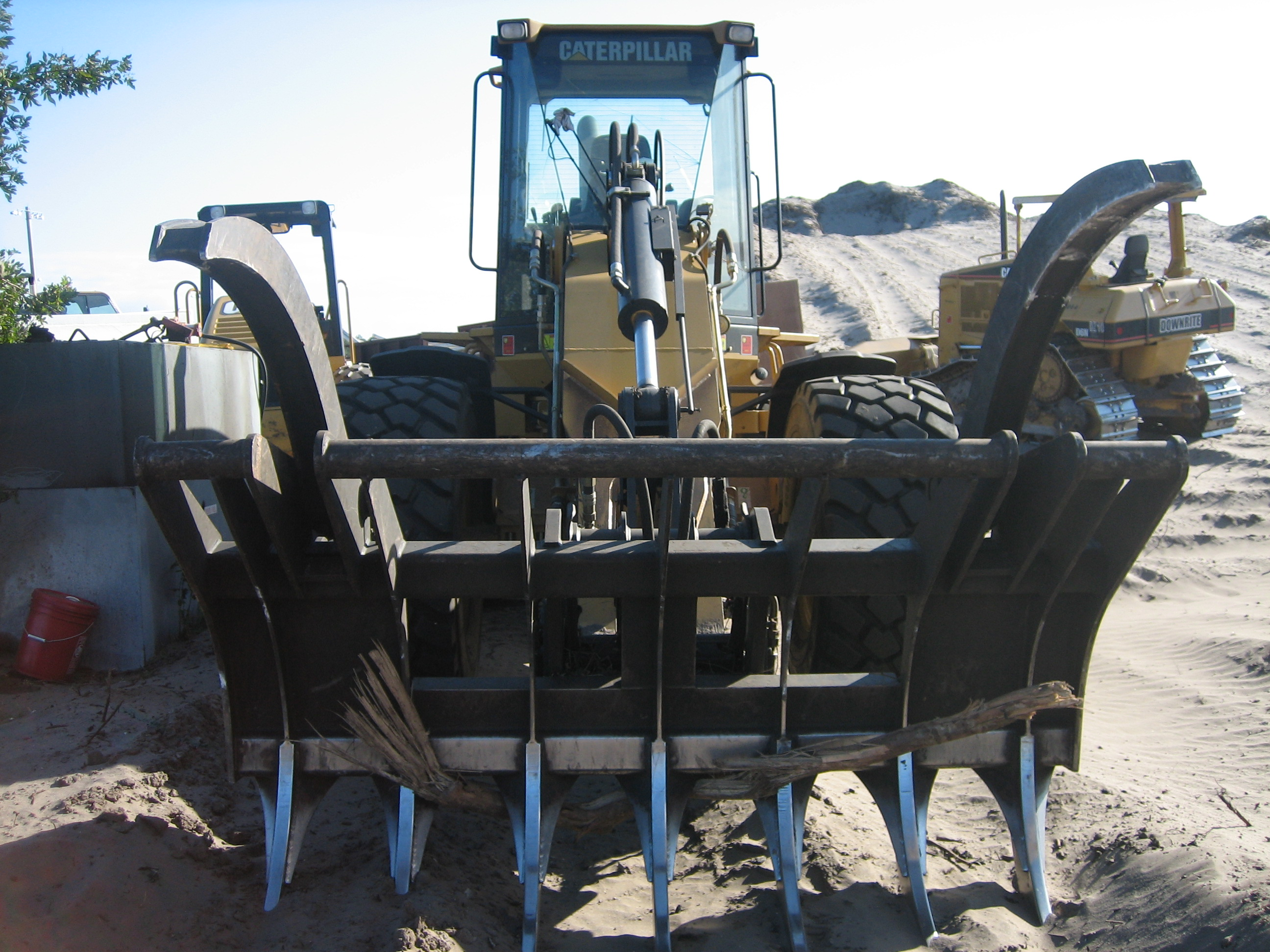
The front of a Caterpillar 930G fitted with loader rake

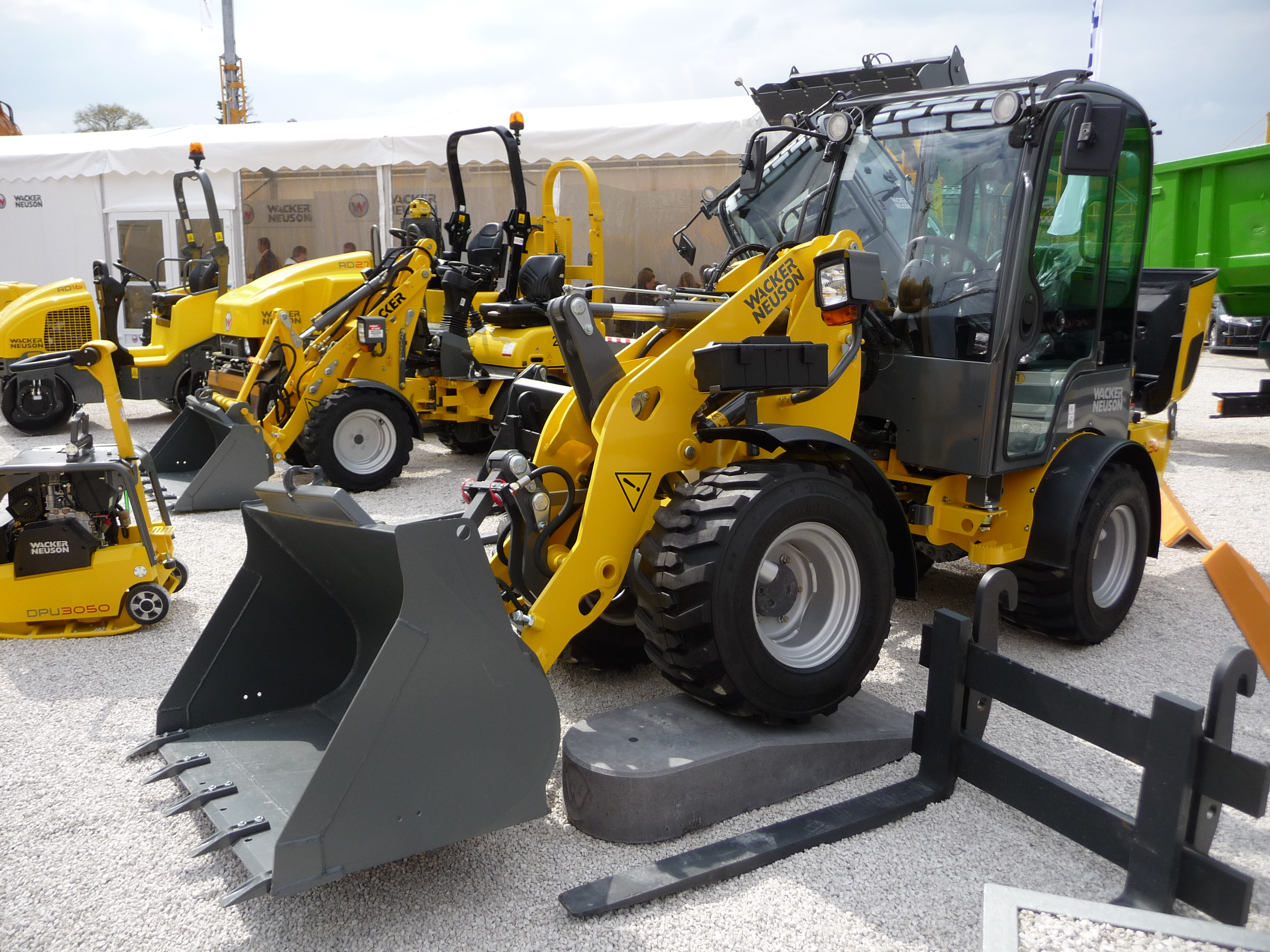
Wacker Neuson wheel loaders at a trade fair

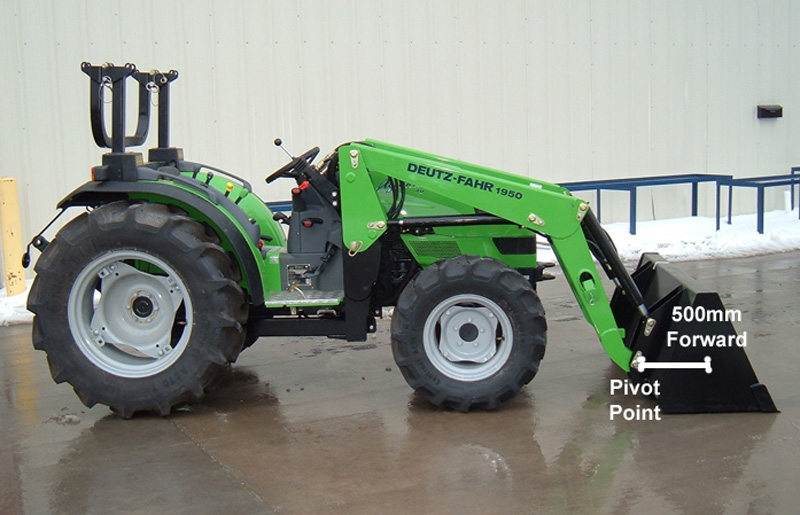
Compact utility tractor with a front loader showing two different measurement points for loader capacities

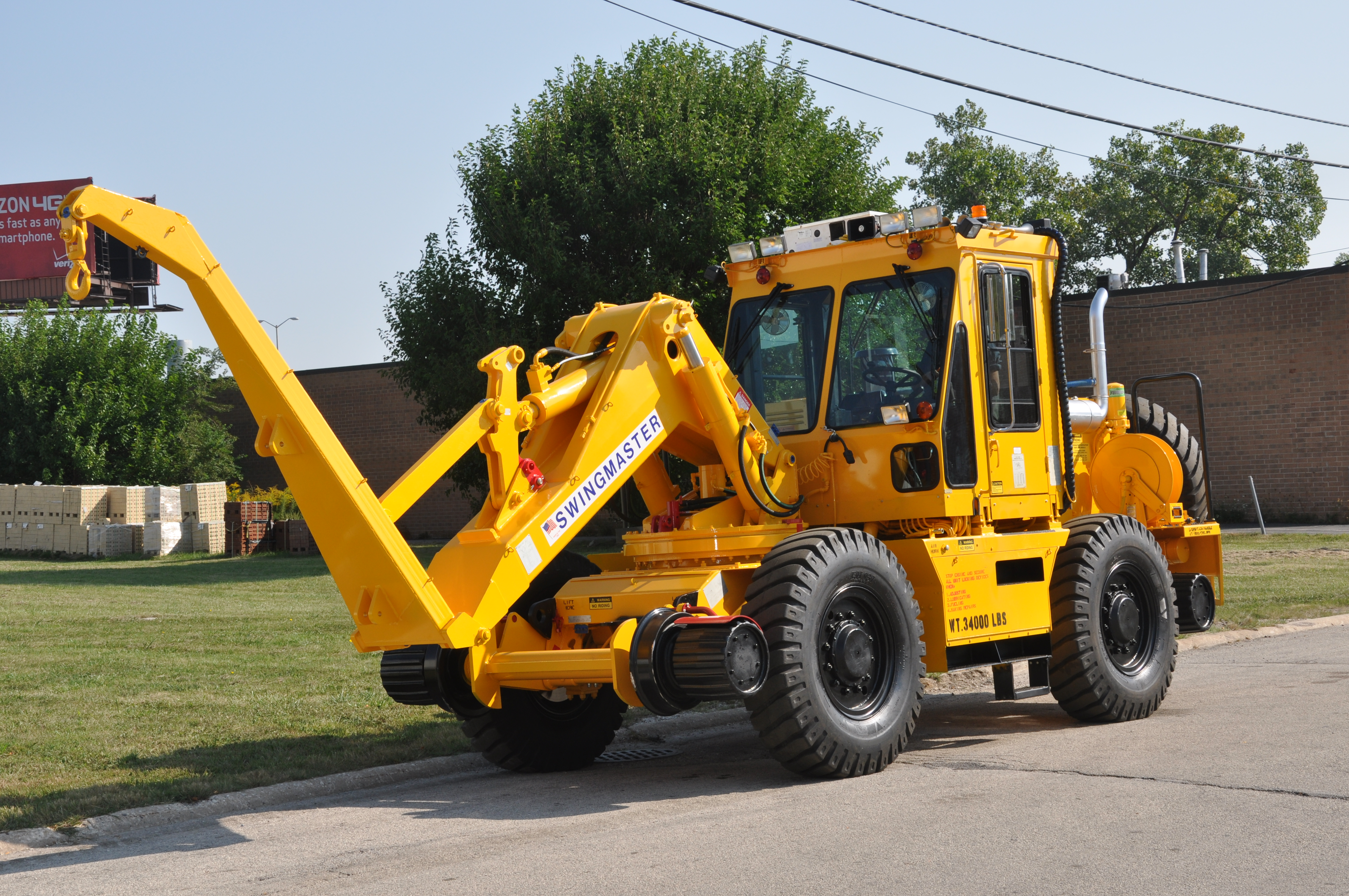
Swingmaster Swingloader

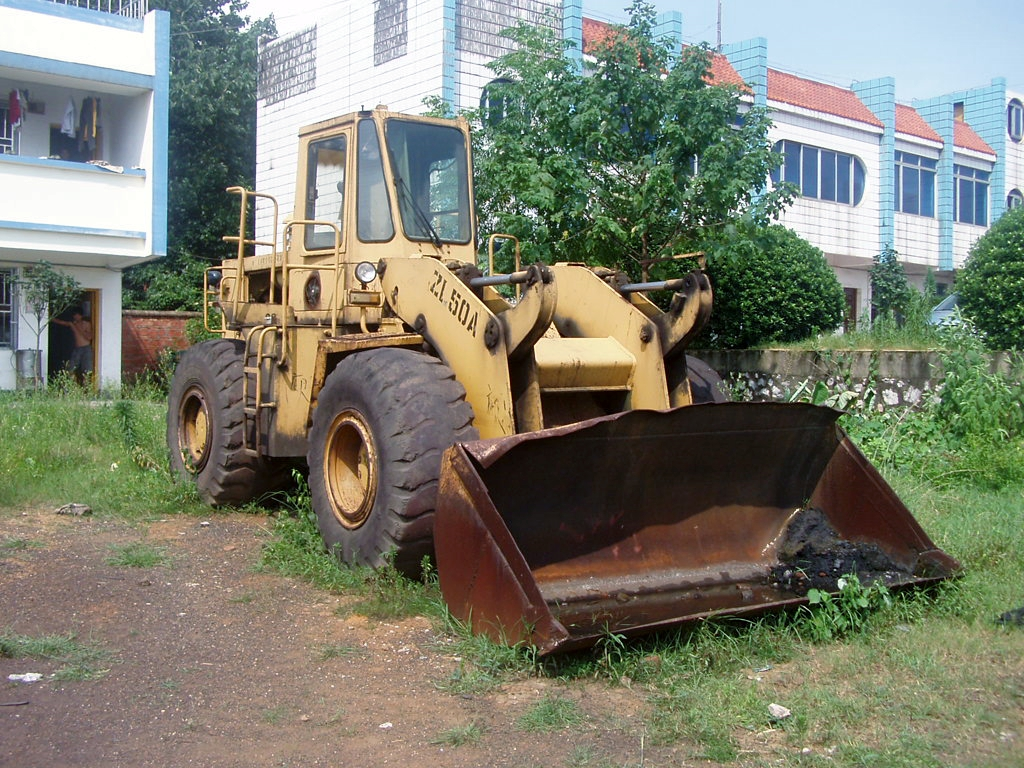
A Liugong ZL50A in Guilin East Railway Station, Guilin, Guangxi, China

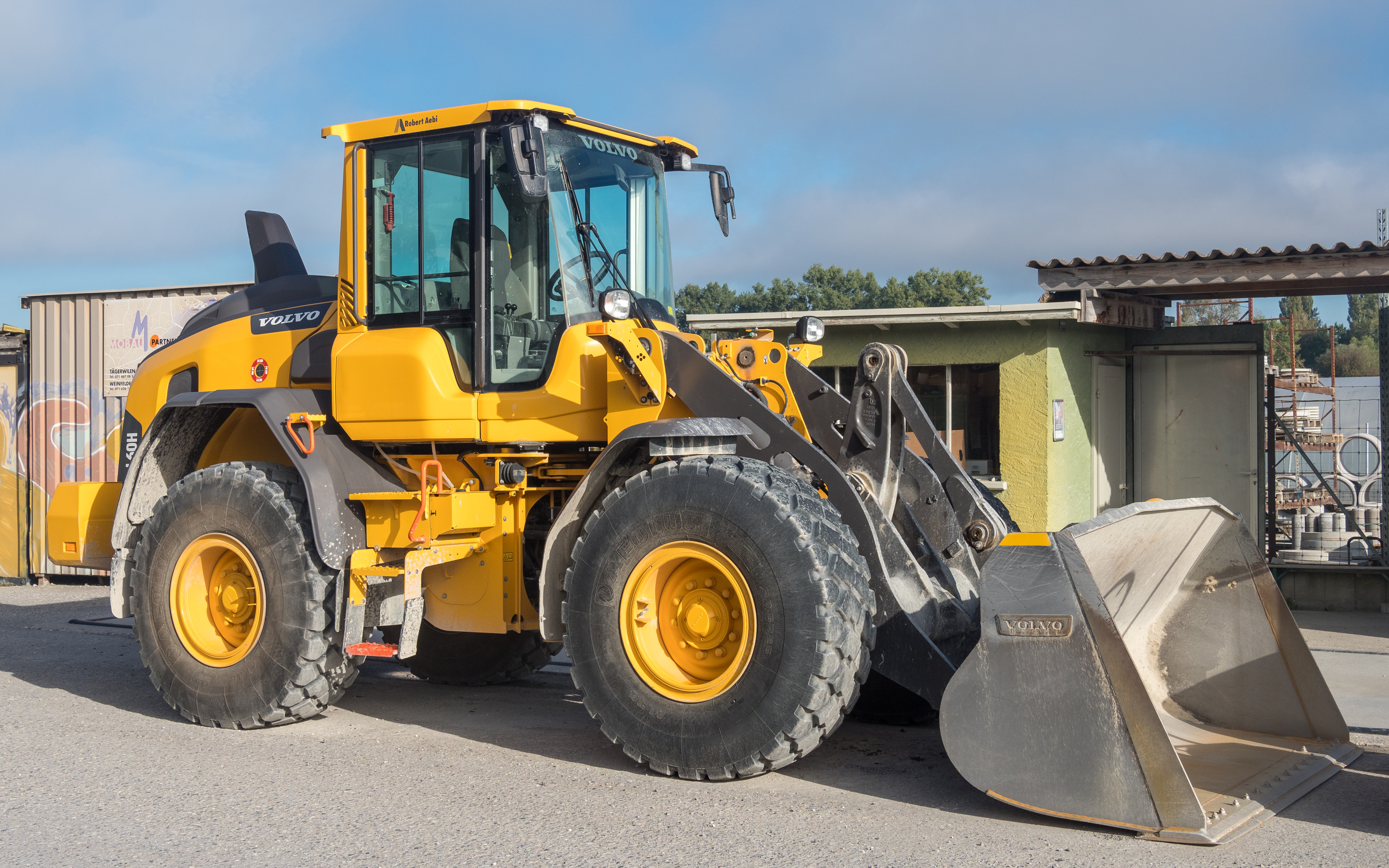
VOLVO L60H Articulated loader

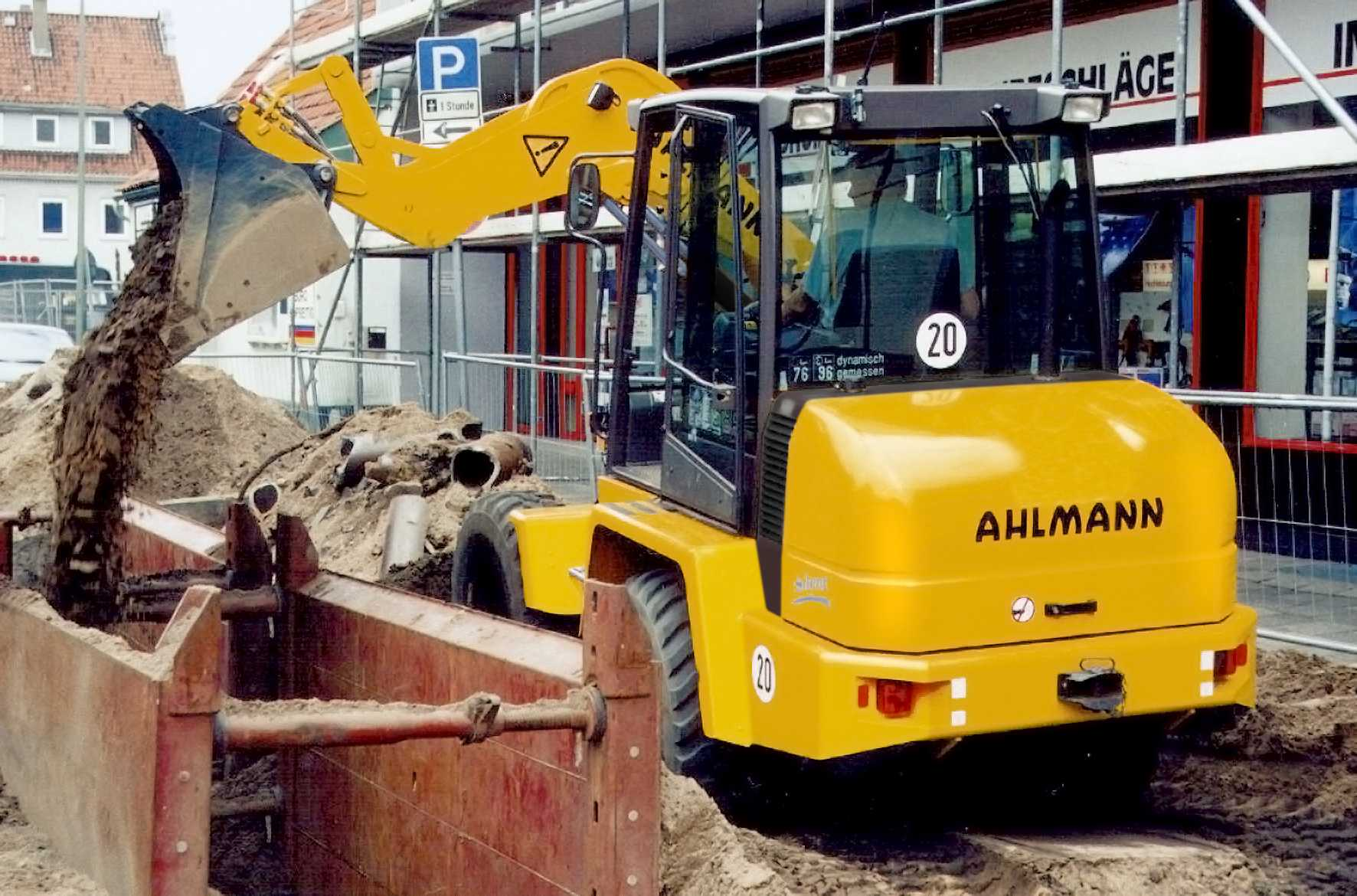
Ahlmann AS90 Swingloder

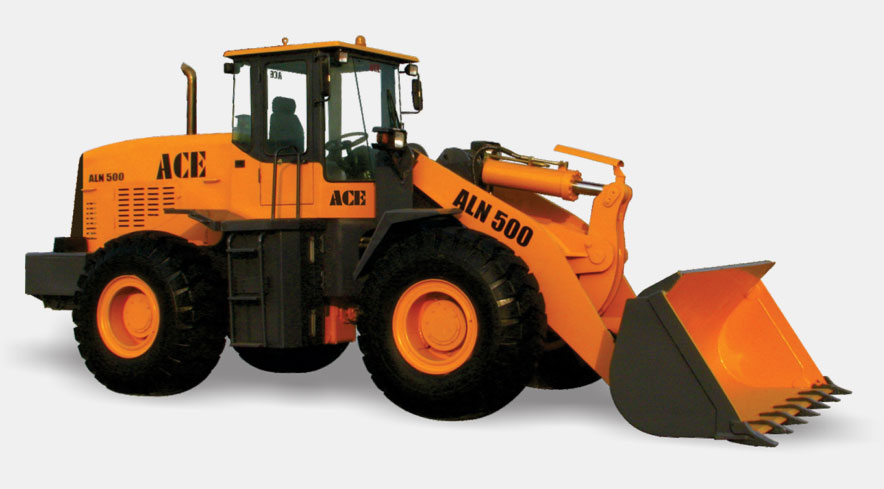
ACE Wheel Loaders ALN 500

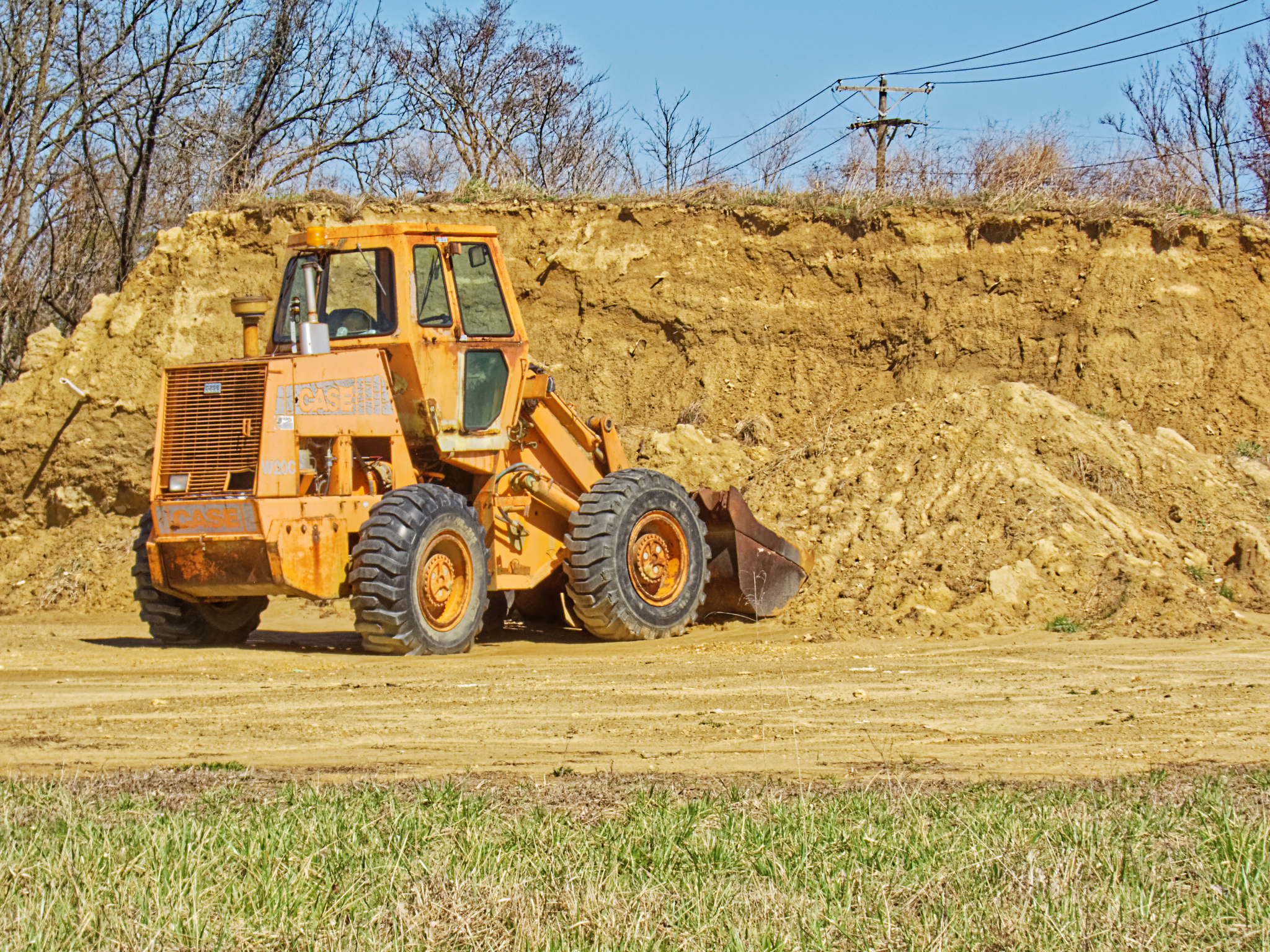
Tuesday_18-March-2025 Case W20C Articulated Loader in Kentucky

== Notable manufacturers ==
Notable loader manufacturers include (by country):

Belarus:
- Amkodor
- BelAZ
- Bobruyskagromash
- MoAZ

China:

- LiuGong
- Lonking
- Lovol
- SANY
- SDLG
- XCMG
- Xiamen XGMA Machinery Co., Ltd.
- Weisheng machine(fujian)

France:

- Manitou

Germany:

- Kramer
- Wacker Neuson

India:

- BEML
- Larsen & Toubro Limited (L&T)
- Tata Hitachi Construction Machinery
- Action Construction Equipment

Iran:

- HEPCO

Italy-US-Netherlands:

- CNH Industrial (produces Case and New Holland designs)

Japan:

- Hitachi Construction Machinery
- Kawasaki Heavy Industries
- Komatsu Limited
- Kubota
- Yanmar

Korea:

- Doosan
- Hyundai Heavy Industries
  - US-based Bobcat

Serbia:

- 14. oktobar

Sweden:

- Volvo Construction Equipment

Switzerland-Germany:

- Liebherr

Turkey:

- Hidromek

United Kingdom:

- JCB

United States:

- Case CE
- Caterpillar Inc.
- John Deere
- Navistar (successor to International Harvester)
- New Holland

== See also ==
- Backhoe loader
- Bulldozer
- Compactor
- Crane
- Excavator
- Grader
- LHD (load, haul, dump machine)
- Skid loader
- Tractor
- Telescopic handler
