= Quick coupler =

Tool used to quickly move buckets

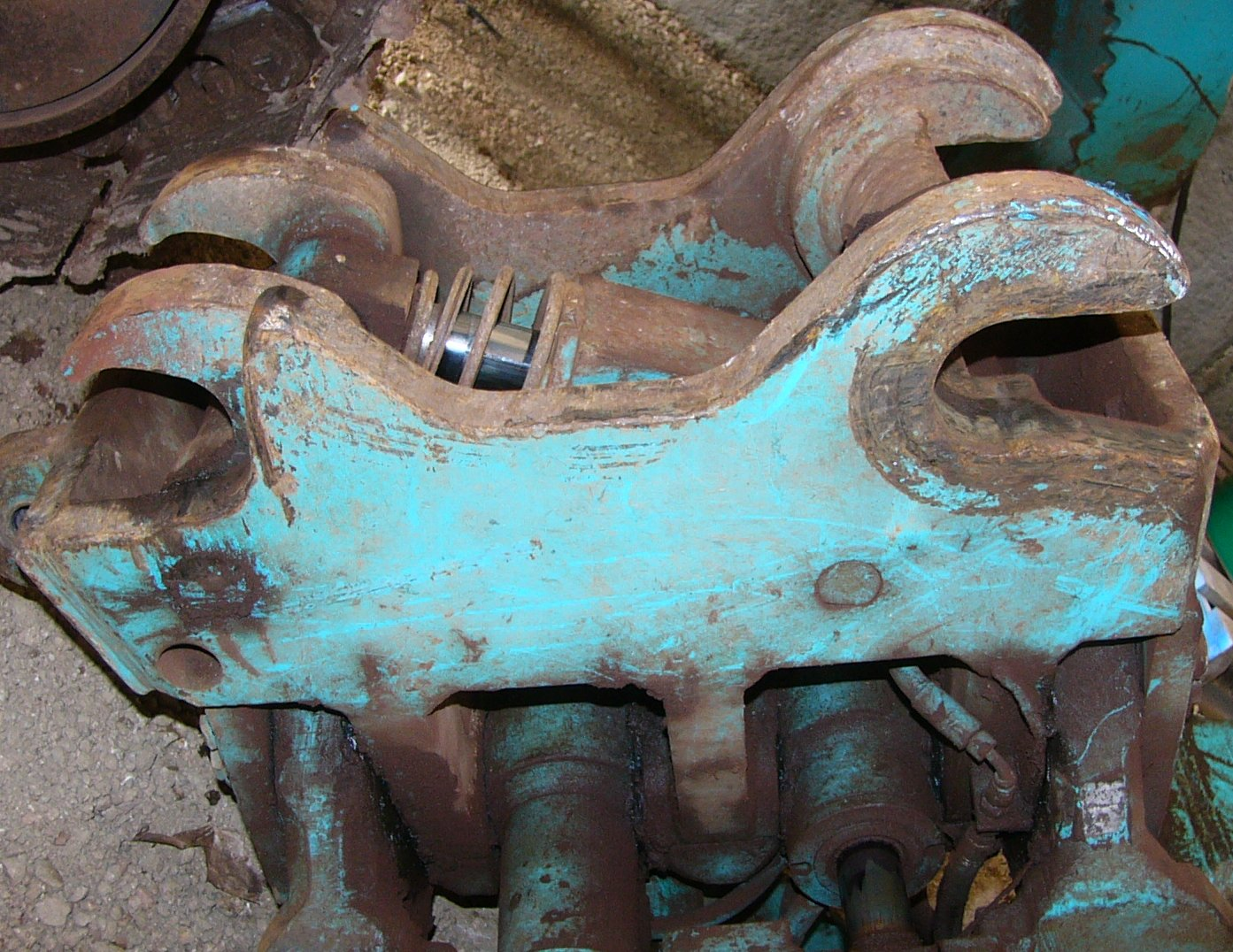
Automatic Quickhitch in the closed position. Note the large spring on the ram, this helps to prevent accidental release of the attachment. Additional safety is available by way of a large pin manually inserted through the hole on the bottom left preventing any movement by the hitch.

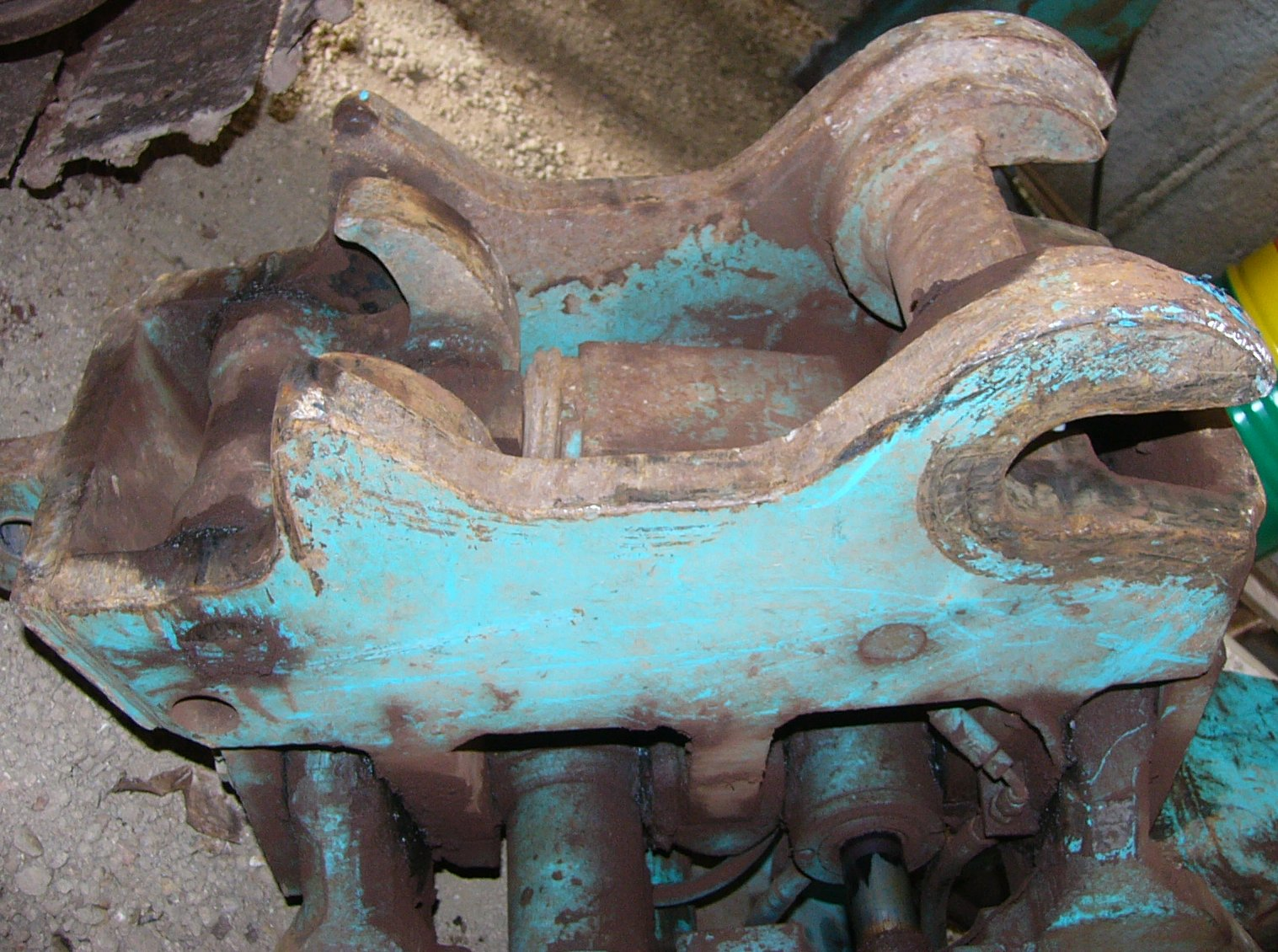
Automatic Quickhitch in the open position, allowing the required attachment to be picked up or released.

Quick couplers (also called quick hitches) are used with construction machines to allow the rapid change of working tools or buckets and attachments on the machine. They remove the need to use hammers to manually drive out and insert the mounting pins for attachments. They also bring with them additional safety risks that must be overcome by careful design and manufacture, and proper use.

== Description ==
Quick couplers are devices installed at the outer end of the work equipment of various types of construction and earth-moving machines. They facilitate the rapid exchange of working tools or buckets. Quick couplers are most common on hydraulic excavators and compact excavators and on the backhoe equipment of backhoe loaders, but are also installed on telescopic handlers, wheel loaders (loading shovels), skid-steer loaders and the loader equipment of backhoe-loaders. They are also occasionally installed on attachments installed on agricultural tractors. Quick couplers do not normally have a specific function themselves in that they do not carry out handling or digging operations, but when installed on a machine they become a part of the overall system. They are usually mounted on the machine by means of the pins that would otherwise be the mountings for the bucket or attachment. This article concentrates on quick couplers installed on excavators and similar equipment.

== Types ==
There are many variations in the design of quick couplers. The initial divergence is between those that can pick up any of a range of buckets and attachments by clamping onto the mounting pins for the attachment (known as "pin grabbers" or "pin couplers") and those that work only with buckets and attachments designed to suit that quick coupler (known as "dedicated"). The claimed advantage of pin-grabbers is flexibility in use in that a machine owner can use a variety of buckets and attachments without changing the quick coupler or buying an adaptor. The claimed advantages of dedicated couplers depend on their individual design but often include better performance and smaller size.

== Operation ==
The method of operation (the picking up and releasing of buckets and attachments) causes the next divergence in design. The types can be described as manual, semi-automatic, and automatic.

Manual
The operation of this type is done, usually by the use of tools, at the coupler itself. The operator needs to leave the operator's station (usually the cab) to go to the end of the work equipment in order to effect the release of a bucket or attachment, and to do the same in order to attach the next bucket or attachment to be used.

Semi-automatic
With this type the hydraulic system of the machine is used to operate the main attachment mechanism but the manual operation of a safety device is necessary at the coupler itself to ensure that the bucket or attachment is safely locked onto the coupler. The safety device is intended to prevent the release of the bucket or attachment in the event of the failure of the hydraulic system, or other major failure of the attachment mechanism. The safety device is most commonly a pin that must be inserted to prevent one of the components in the quick coupler moving to release the bucket or attachment but some designs require the manual operation of a lever on the quick coupler.

Automatic
This type use the hydraulic system of the machine to operate the main attachment mechanism and have an internal safety device. As with semi-automatic systems the safety device is designed to prevent the release of the bucket or attachment in the event of a failure of the hydraulic system.

Within the above three categories there are many further divergences in operating principles and detail designs. There are many competing claims relating to the safety and performance benefits and demerits of each design.

== Safety issues ==
Fatalities have occurred due to buckets being accidentally released from work equipment during operation. Released buckets have hit bystanders causing fatal injuries. These have been reported in most detail in the UK, but there are reports of fatalities in Australia, the Republic of Ireland and the USA. The causes of the fatal accidents are not always the same and the views of safety authorities in different countries differ on how to reduce risk. In the UK the Health and Safety Executive (HSE) analysed the accident data and concluded that all of the known fatalities were caused by the operator not inserting the safety pin in semi-automatic couplers. Even without the safety pin inserted the buckets would not have been released unless there had been a failure of some part of the mechanism, or some error in operation by the operator. The HSE concluded that the most effective way to reduce the risk of further accidents was for semi-automatic couplers to be withdrawn from sale. The suppliers of these couplers agreed to this voluntarily so semi-automatic couplers were withdrawn from sale in the UK by around October 2008. Safety authorities in other countries have taken a different approach. In Australia the authorities took the view that the problems were caused by designs of quick couplers that did not incorporate a safety pin. That is, they believe that semi-automatics are fundamentally safe. The Australian standard for quick couplers published by Standards Australia, AS 4774 - 2008 therefore does not exclude this design option. It is therefore obvious that the views of the safety authorities of the UK and Australia on what constitutes a safe design are very divergent. In the UK some major construction contractors have written their own specifications for quick couplers allowed on sites under their control. That is, they have pursued site safety via a procurement policy. An alternative approach has been put forward by the Strategic Forum Plant Safety Group. A working party under this group has drawn up a best practice guide that has been endorsed, inter alia, by the HSE. This provides an alternative route to site safety: adhering to best practice in the use of quick couplers.

== Market ==
The market for quick couplers is mainly supplied by a large number of small and medium-sized enterprises. Many of the manufacturers of quick couplers are small, flexible and innovative, leading to the wide variation in design concepts. Many Original Equipment Manufacturers (OEMs) of construction equipment market a range of quick couplers. Some of these are designed and manufactured by the OEM but more often they are the products of one of the quick coupler manufacturers branded by the OEM and sold through the OEM's distribution chain or installed by the OEM in their factory. In addition to the supply route from the OEMs many distributors of construction machinery will install quick couplers onto machines before delivery at the request of a customer. Quick coupler manufacturers will also sell direct to end-users and usually complete the installation as part of the sale.

== Development of international safety standards ==
A European standard in place since 1996 gives some guidance on the safety of quick couplers (EN474-1). However, this standard is unclear in many aspects leading to uncertainty as to whether semi-automatic couplers comply with it or not. Because of this the UK government launched a "safeguard action" under the Machinery Safety Directive (98/37/EC) challenging the validity of the standard and demanding that it be improved. The European Committee for Standardization (CEN) have therefore undertaken to revise the relevant section of the standard. Because of the divergence in design concepts and in opinions on how to manage the associated risks the International Organization for Standardization (ISO) has undertaken to draft an International Standard on the safety of quick couplers. This project is being undertaken by Technical Committee 127 (ISO TC/127). A Working Group was set up to draft the standard, which will be reviewed internationally through normal ISO procedures and will be published as ISO 13031. This work will probably be completed in 2013. The intention in Europe is that, subject to the standard being suitable, the ISO standard would then be adopted as the standard for Europe.
