= Lonking =

Chinese construction machinery manufacturer

Lonking Holdings Limited 中国龙工控股有限公司
- Type: Privately owned company
- Industry: Construction machinery
- Founded: 1993
- Founder: Li San Yim
- Headquarters: Longyan, Fujian, China
- Area served: Worldwide
- Key people: Chairman: Mr. Zhang En-rong
- Website: www.lonkinggroup.com

Lonking Holdings Limited (SEHK: 3339), formerly China Infrastructure Machinery Holdings Limited (CIMH), is one of the largest private manufacturers of construction machinery in Longyan, Fujian, China. It is involved in the manufacturing and distribution of wheel loaders, road rollers, excavators and forklifts. It has 18 wholly owned subsidiaries at present.

The company was established in 1993. It was listed on the Hong Kong Stock Exchange in 2005. In 2008, its English name was changed from China Infrastructure Machinery Holdings Limited to Lonking Holdings Limited. The company manufactures wheel loaders, excavators, road rollers, motor graders, forklifts and their components such as transmissions, torque converters, axles, hydraulic components, gears, tubes & hoses, drive shafts, etc.
