= Hidromek =

Construction machinery manufacturer

- Type: S.A. (corporation)
- Industry: Heavy equipment
- Founded: 1978
- Founder: Hasan Basri Bozkurt
- Headquarters: Ankara, Turkey,
- Area served: Worldwide
- Key people: Hasan Basri Bozkurt (Founder, Former Chairman of the Board); Mustafa Bozkurt (Chairman of the Board)
- Products: Construction equipment, Mining equipment
- Revenue: $602 million (2023)
- Number of employees: 2,400 (2024)
- Website: www.hidromek.com.tr

Hidromek is a Turkish heavy equipment manufacturer of backhoe loaders, hydraulic excavators, wheel loaders, motor graders, soil compactor, and telescopic handler. Founded in Ankara in 1978 by Hasan Basri Bozkurt, as of 2024, Hidromek has around 2400 employees across six production facilities - four in Ankara, one in Izmir and one in Thailand.

== History ==
Hidromek was founded in 1978 by Hasan Basri Bozkurt in a small workshop in Ankara. In the first years, Hidromek produced parts such as pumps and torque converters for construction machines. In the following years, Hidromek was engaged in the business of producing and assembling loader and digger attachments on the agricultural tractors and converting them into a construction machine. In 1989, Hidromek produced its first original machine, the first backhoe loader. In 1999, Hidromek made its first international sale to Tunisia. In 2000, Hidromek produced the first excavator. Production and assembly facilities are located in Ankara and Izmir, overseas production and assembly facility is located in Thailand. In 2013, Hidromek acquired the Motor Grader unit of Japanese machinery manufacturer Mitsubishi Heavy Industries.

Hidromek started to develop military heavy equipment for armies. In 2014, the Spanish Army bought HMK102B backhoe loaders.

== Hidromek's Products ==
- Backhoe loaders
- Wheel excavators
- Crawler excavators
- Special purpose excavators
- Motor graders
- Wheel loaders
- Soil compactors

== Gallery ==
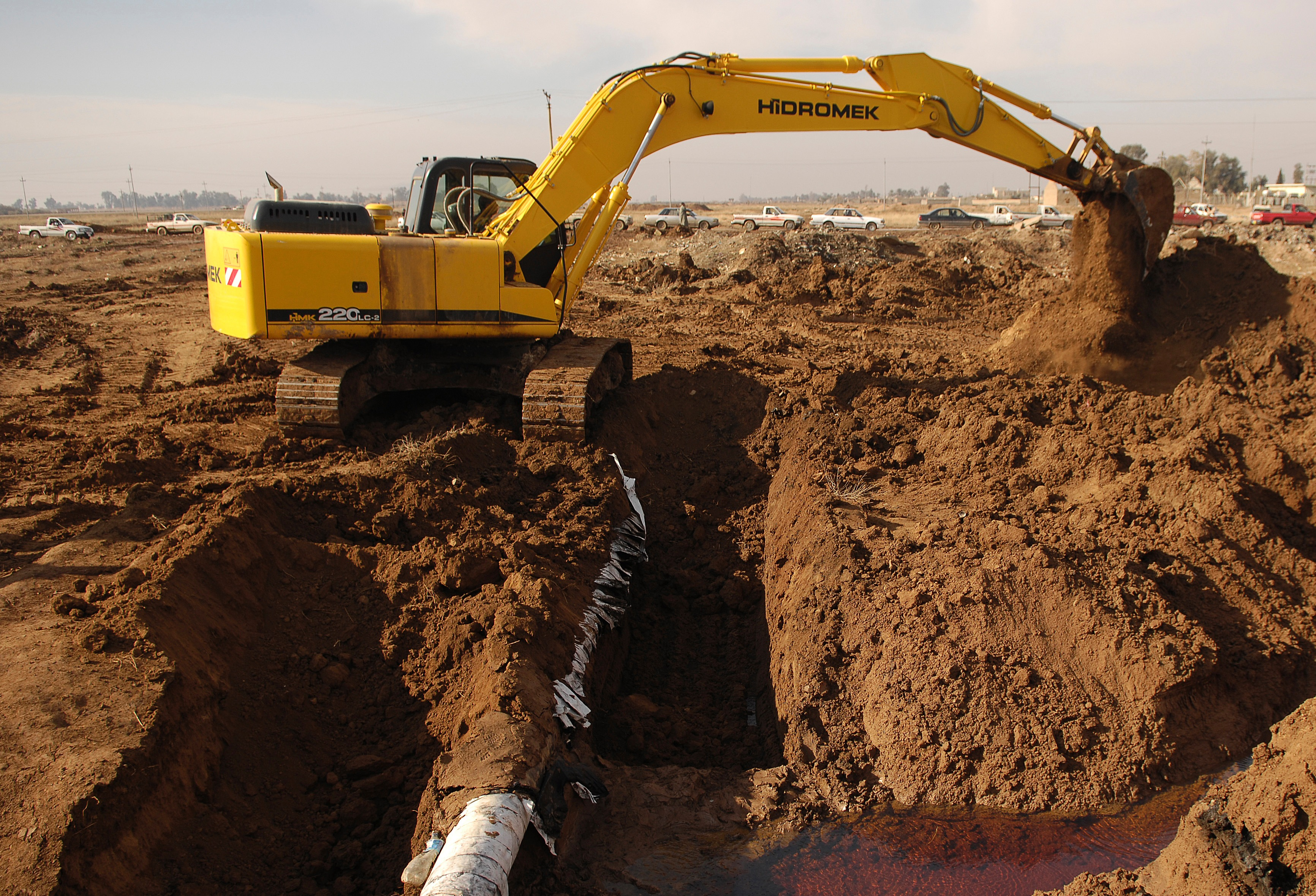
Hidromek Excavator.

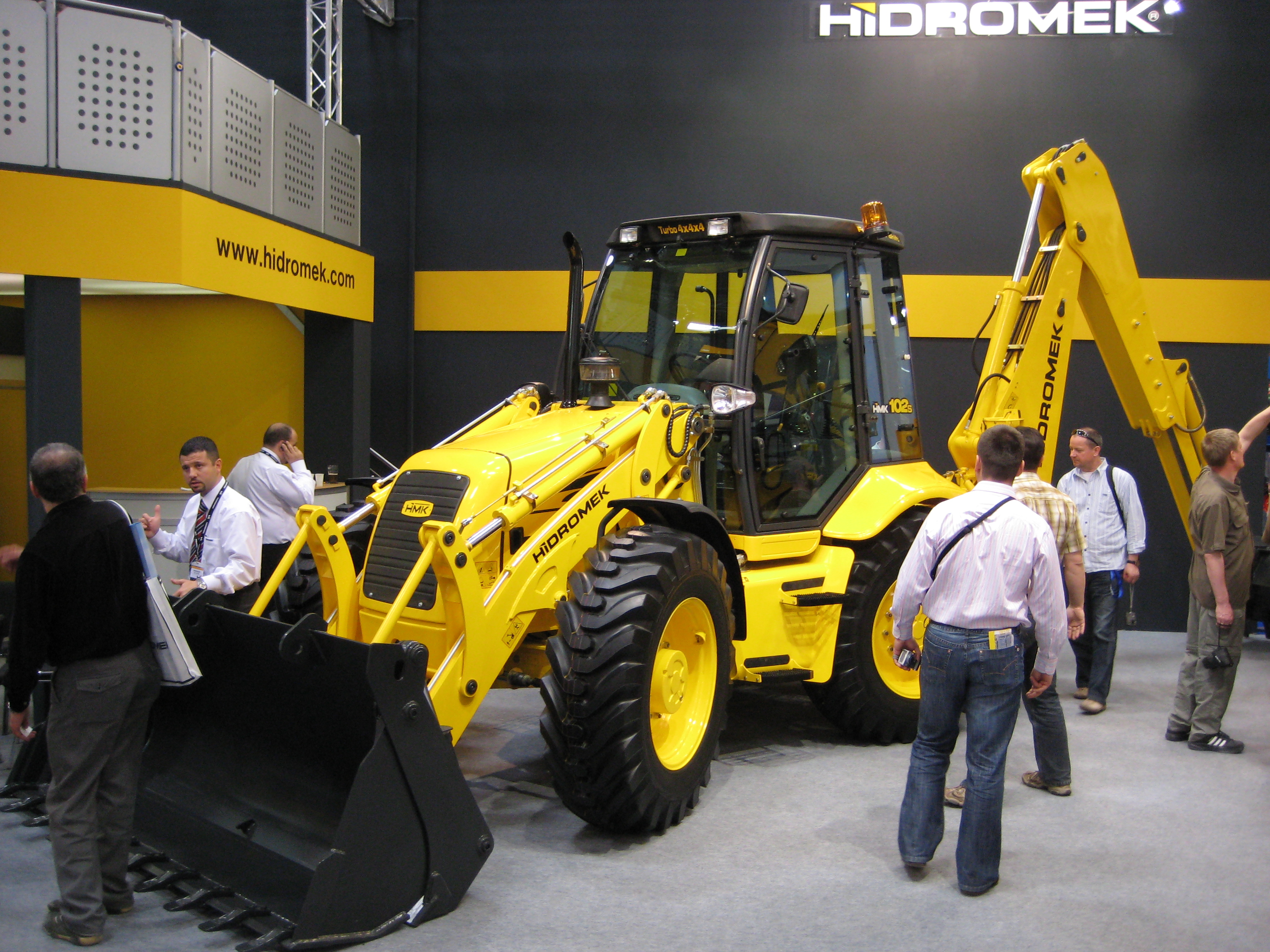
Hidromek Backhoe Loader Hidromek at Bauma 2007.

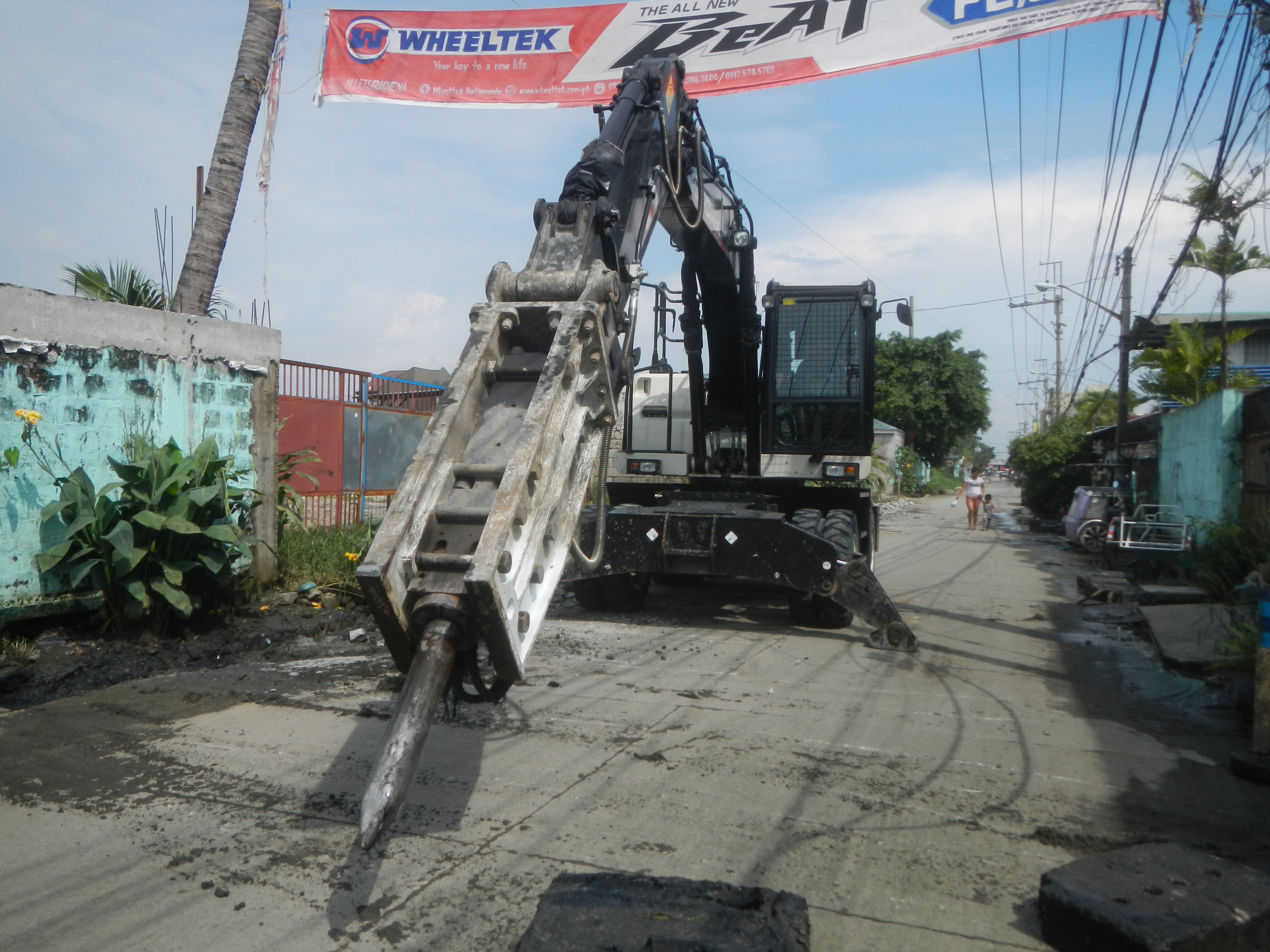
Hidromek vehicle on a road in the Philippines.

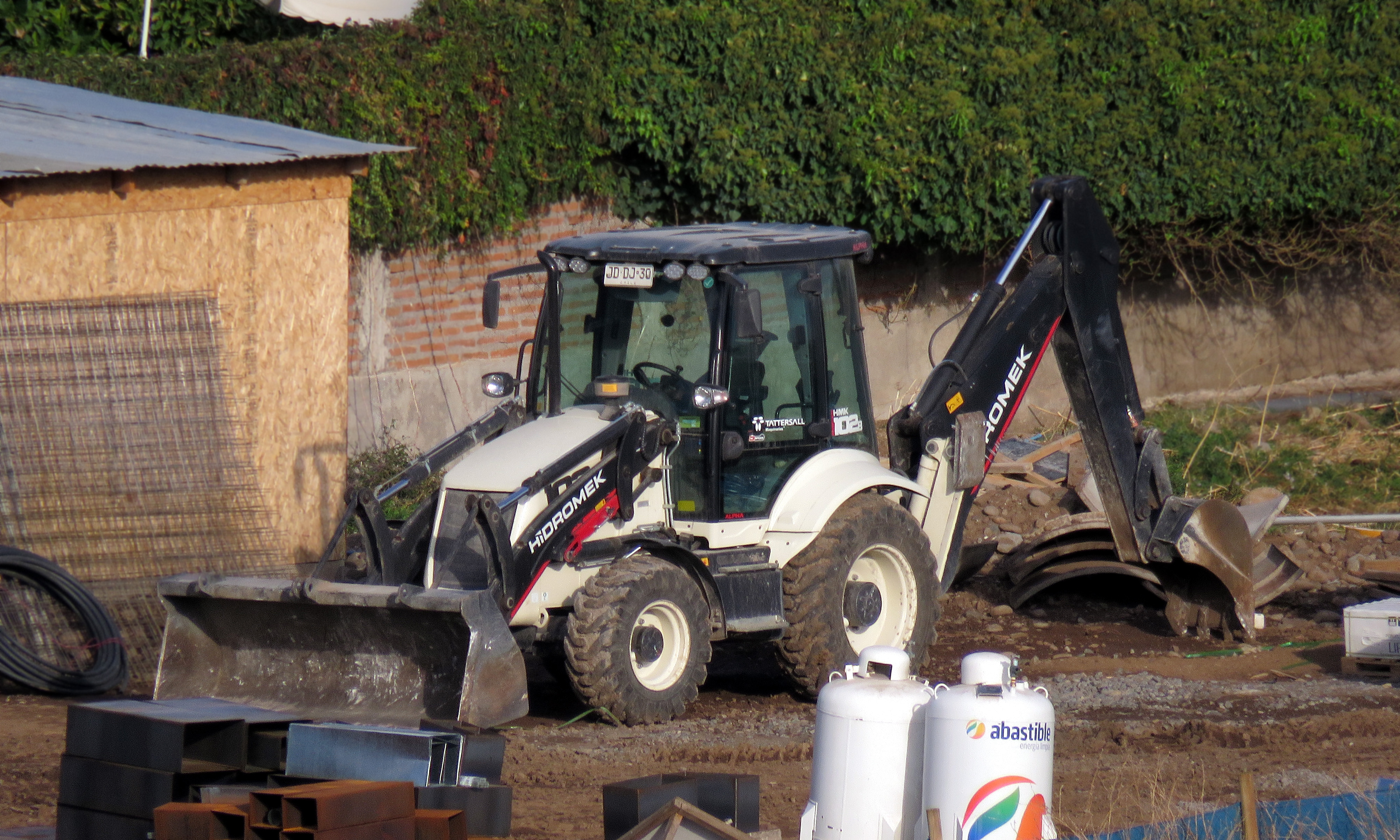
HMK 102B ALPHA Backhoe loader.

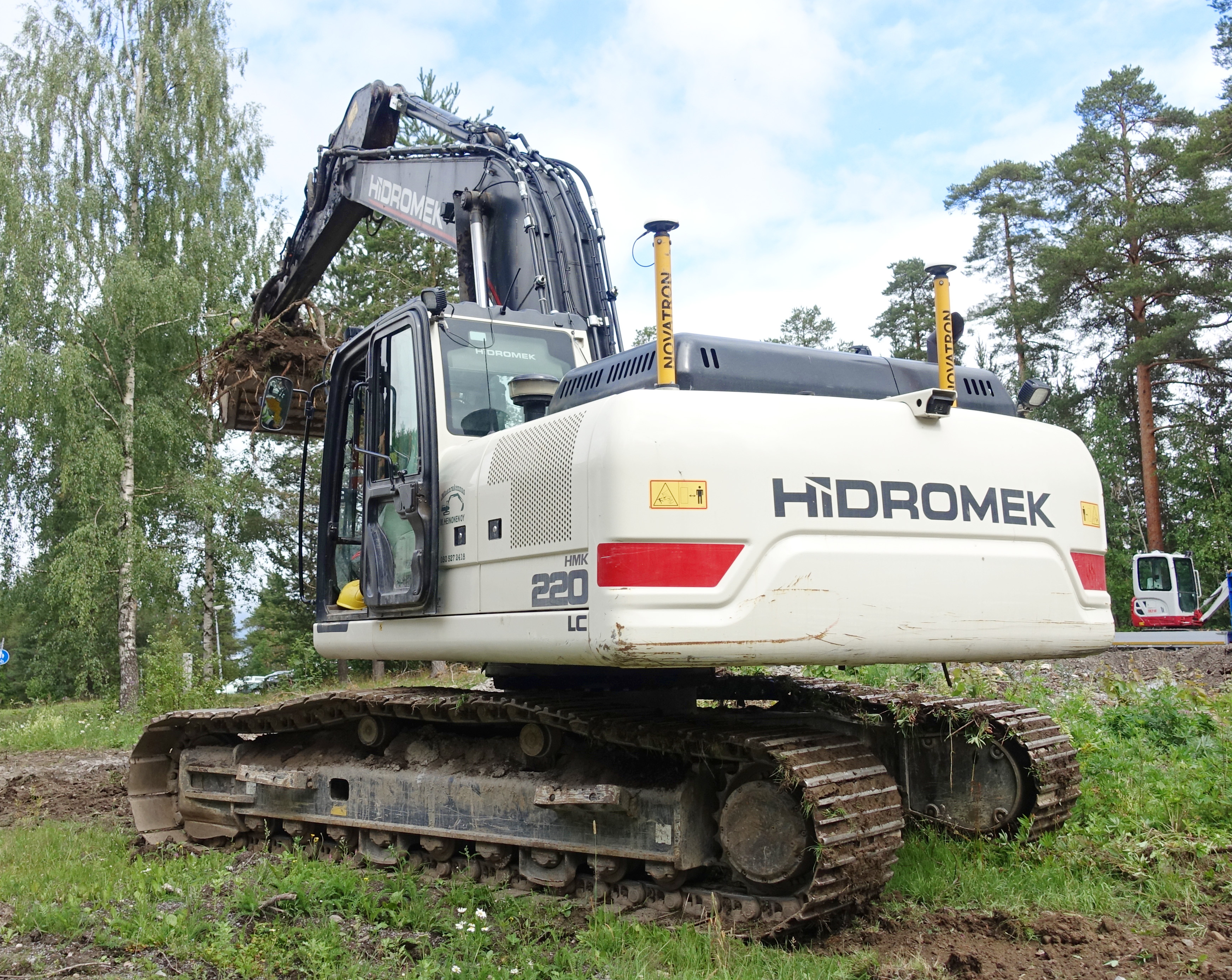
Hidromek Crawler excavator.
