= Excavator =

Type of construction equipment

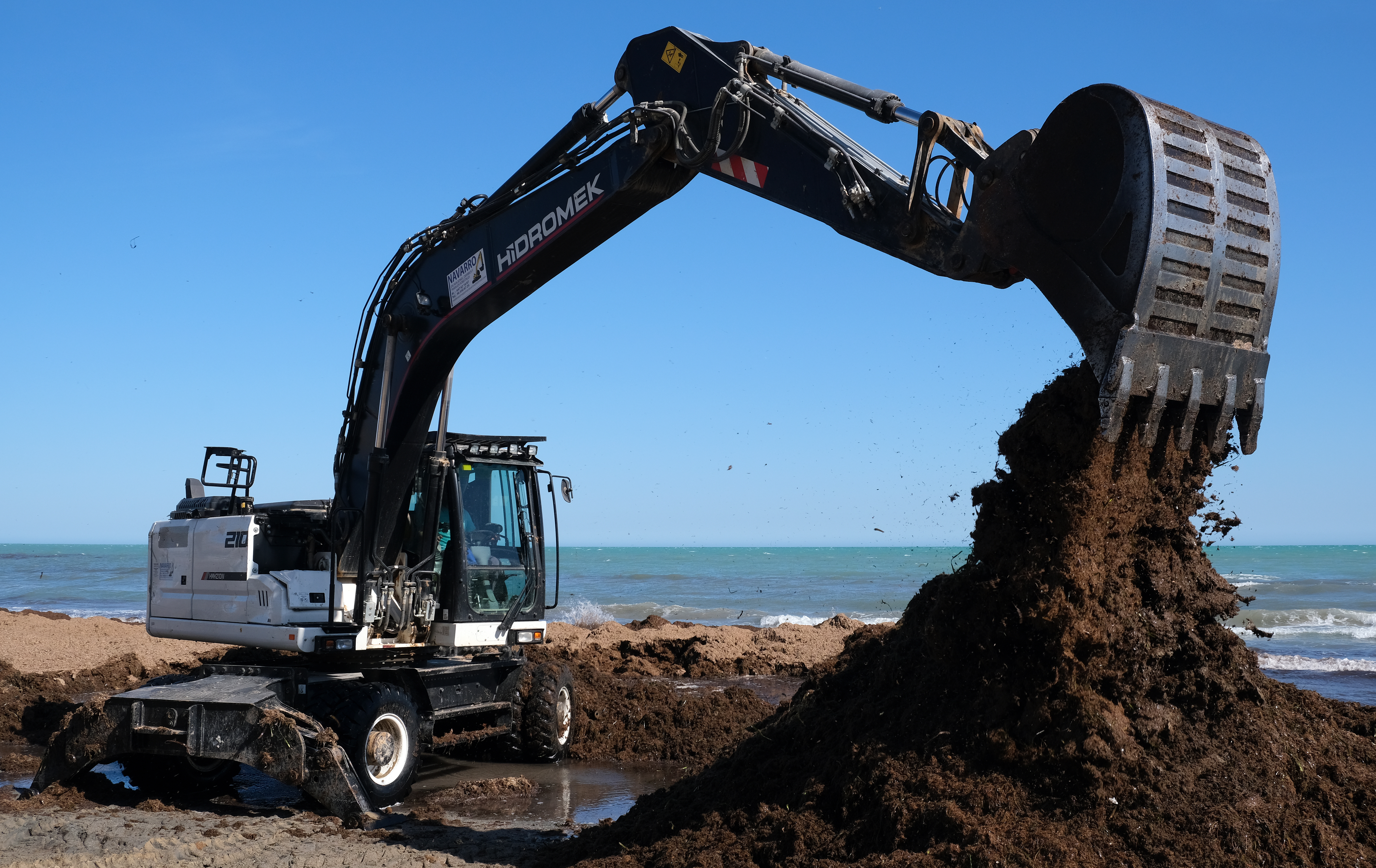
Hidromek excavator in Alicante, Spain

Excavators in Kanagawa, Japan

Excavators are heavy construction equipment primarily consisting of a boom, dipper (or stick), bucket, and cab on a rotating platform known as the "house".

The modern excavator's house sits atop an undercarriage with tracks or wheels, being an evolution of the steam shovel (which itself evolved into the power shovel when steam was replaced by diesel and electric power). All excavation-related movement and functions of a hydraulic excavator are accomplished through the use of hydraulic fluid, with hydraulic cylinders and hydraulic motors, which replaced winches, chains, and steel ropes (utilized by dragline excavators). Another principle change was the direction of the digging action, with modern excavators pulling their buckets toward them like a dragline rather than pushing them away to fill them the way the first powered shovels did.

== Terminology ==
Excavators are also called diggers, scoopers, mechanical shovels, or 360-degree excavators (sometimes abbreviated simply to "360"). Tracked excavators are sometimes called "trackhoes" by analogy to the backhoe. In the UK, wheeled excavators are sometimes known as "rubber ducks".

== Usage ==
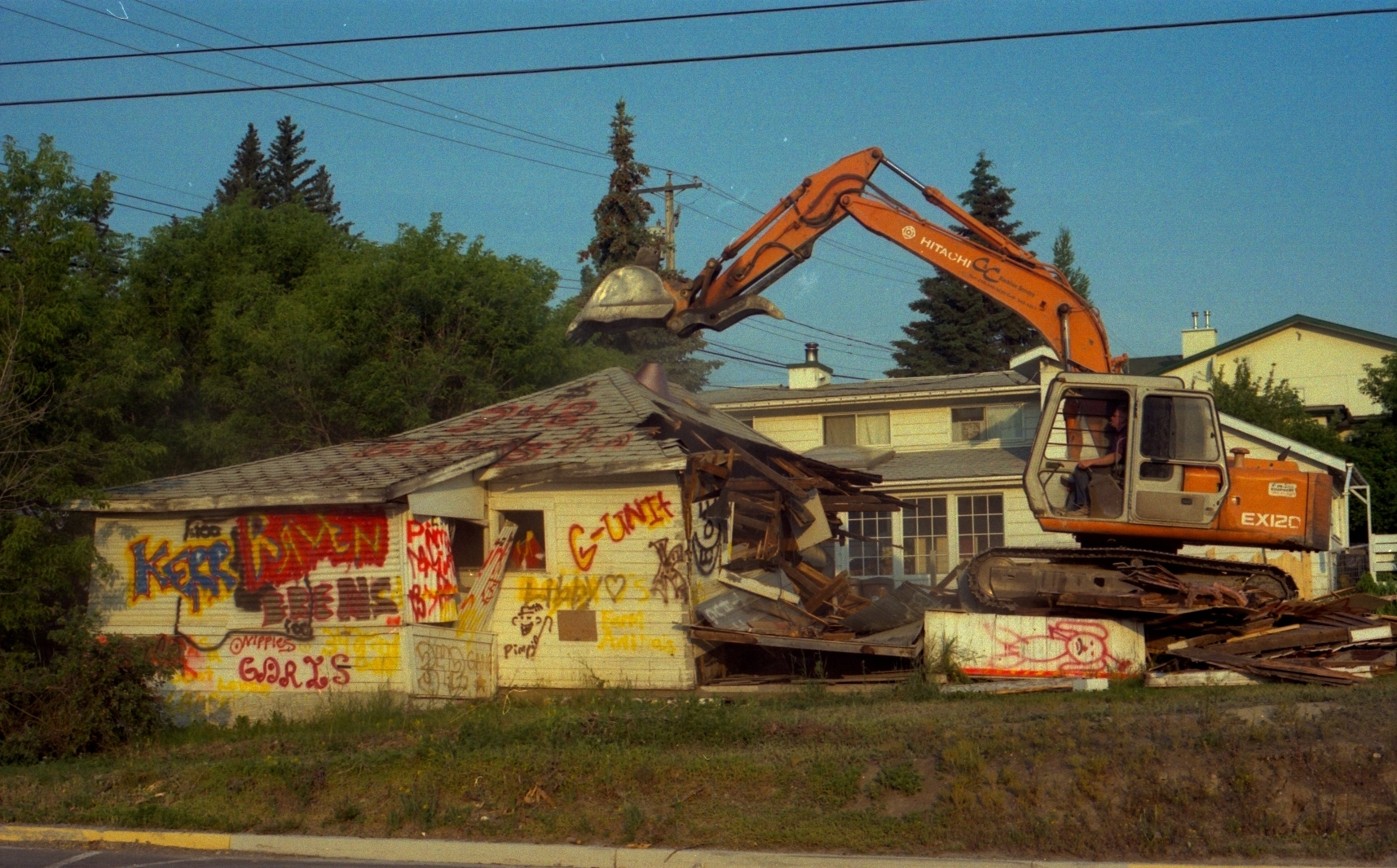
House demolition by a Hitachi excavator in Invermere, British Columbia

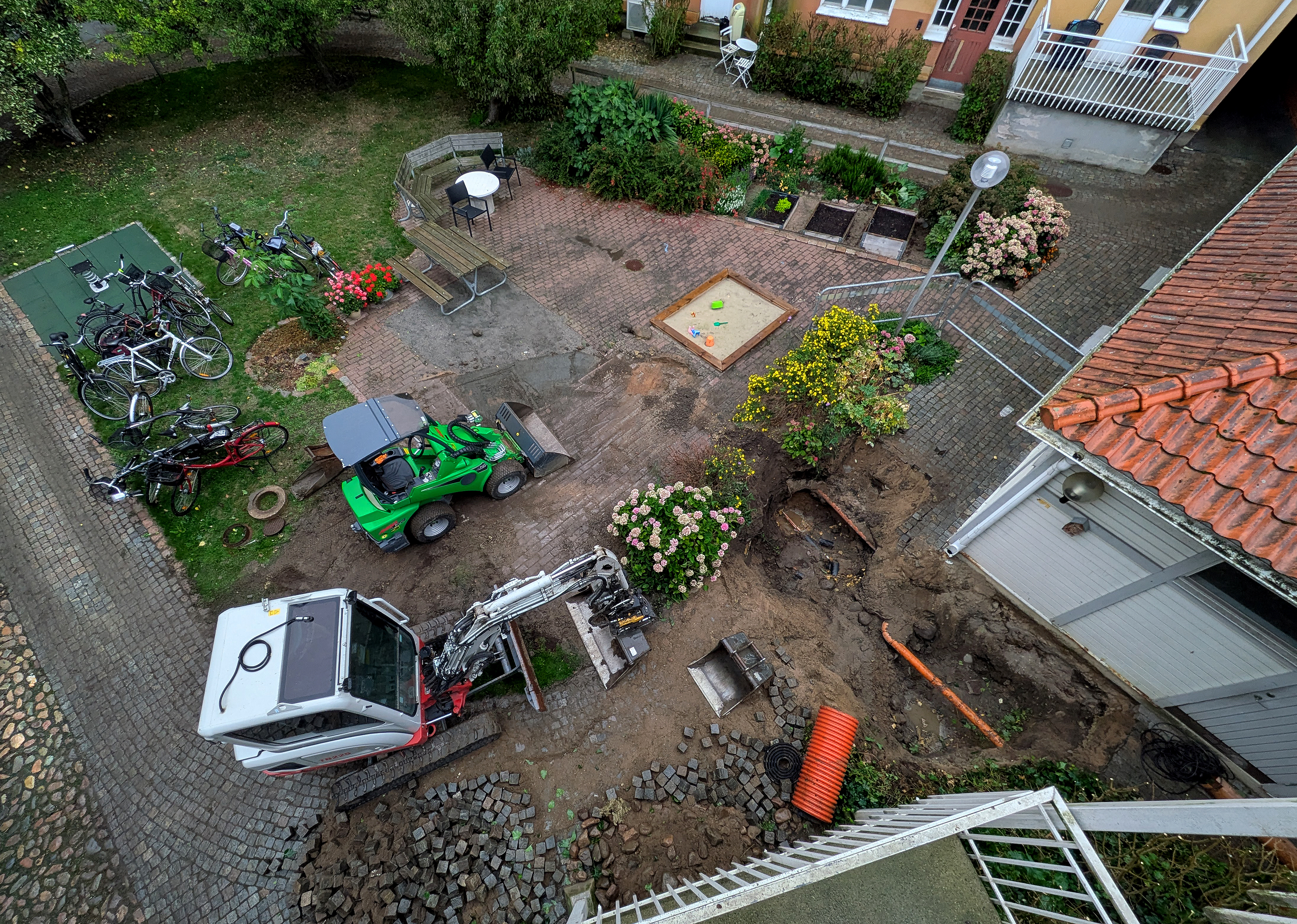
Two small excavators carry out excavation work after a water leak in a courtyard.

Excavators are used in many ways:

- Digging of trenches, holes, foundations
- Material handling
- Brush cutting with hydraulic saw, mower, and stump removal attachments
- Forestry work
- Forestry mulching
- Demolition with hydraulic claw, cutter and breaker attachments
- Mining, especially, but not only open-pit mining
- River dredging
- Hydro excavation to access fragile underground infrastructure using high pressure water
- Driving piles, in conjunction with a pile driver
- Drilling shafts for footings and rock blasting, by use of an auger or hydraulic drill attachment
- Snow removal with snowplow and snow blower attachments
- Aircraft recycling
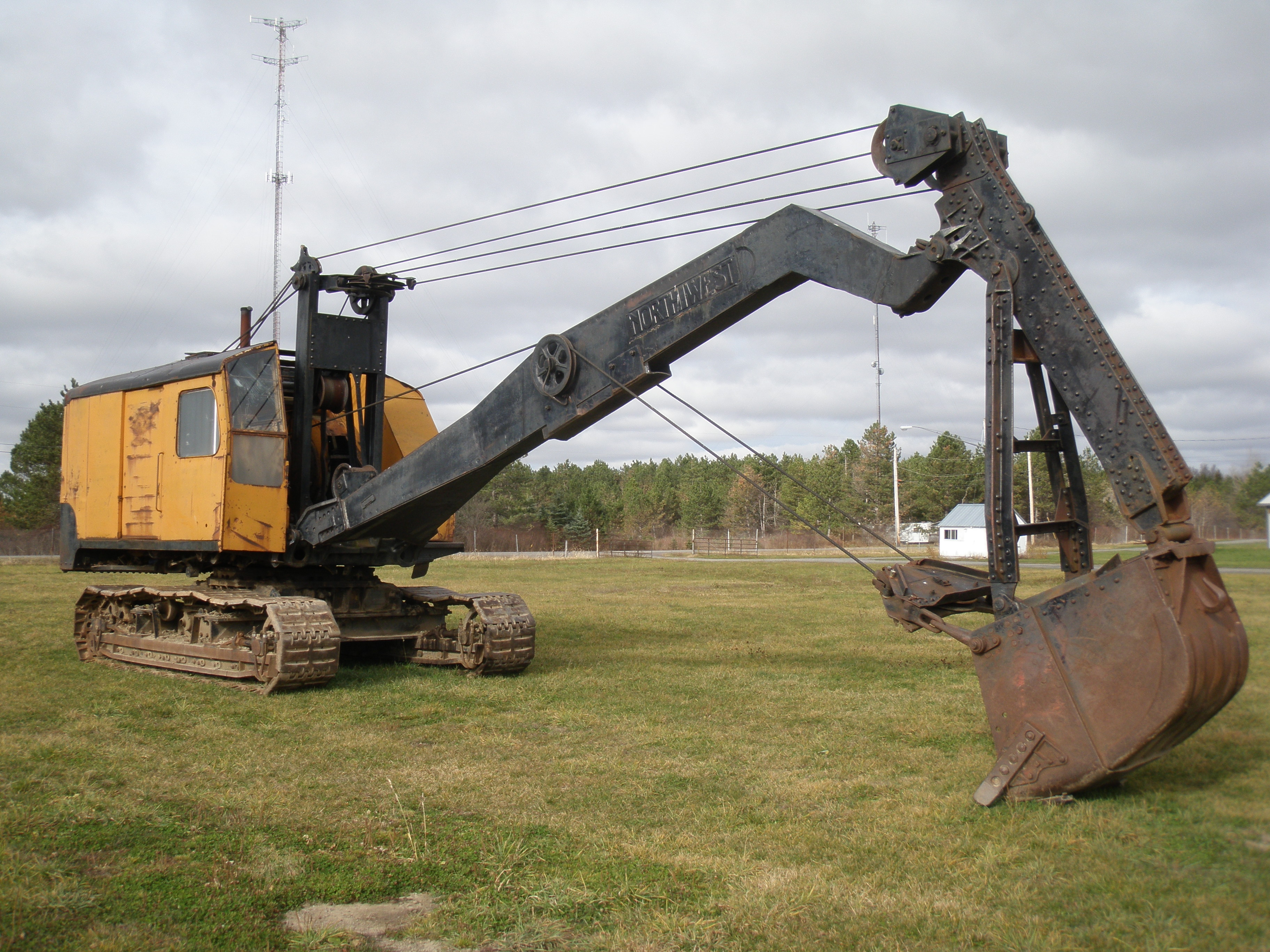
A cable-operated excavator under the Northwest (now Terex) name at the Pageant of Steam grounds

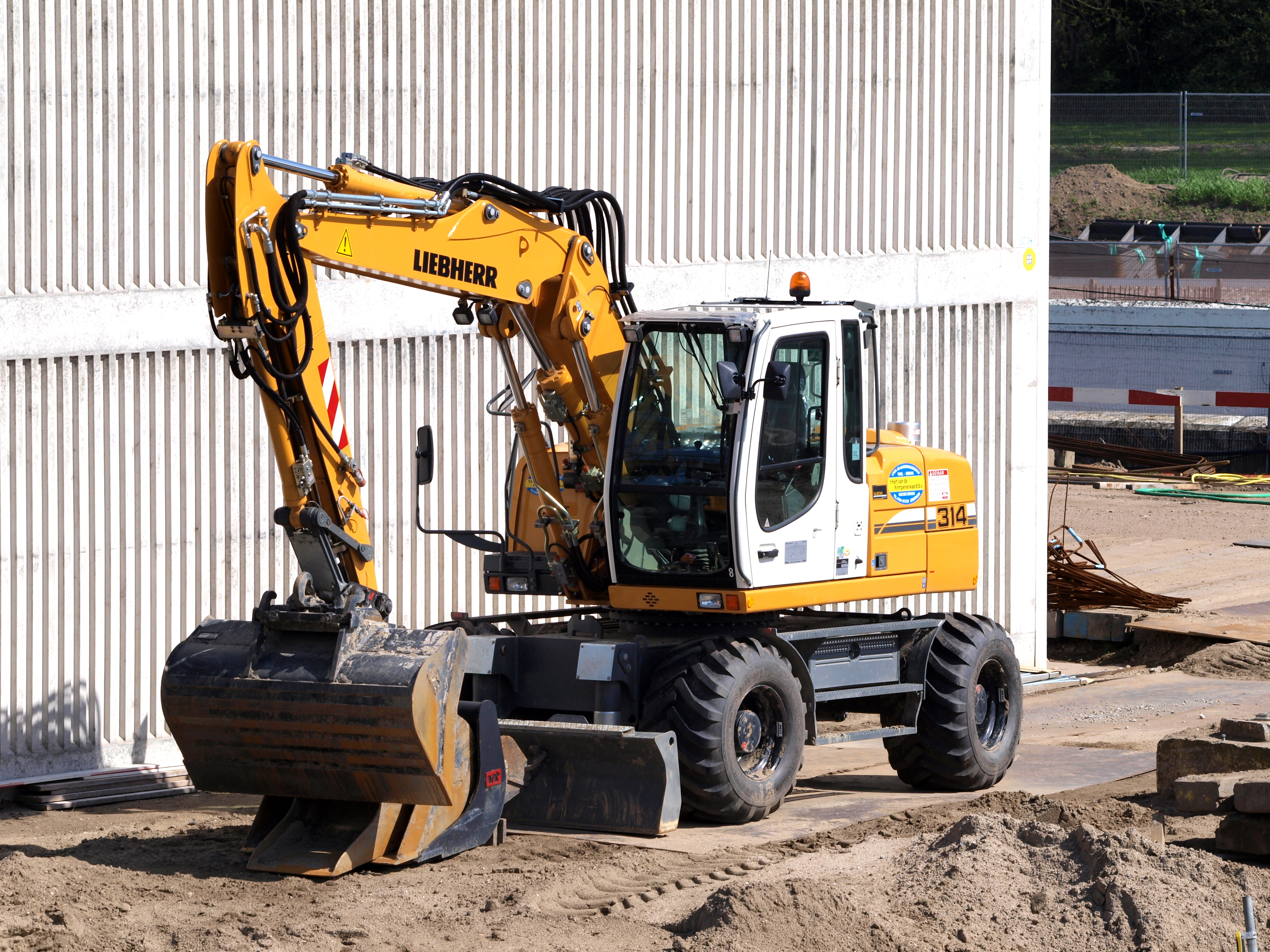
Liebherr 314 wheeled excavator

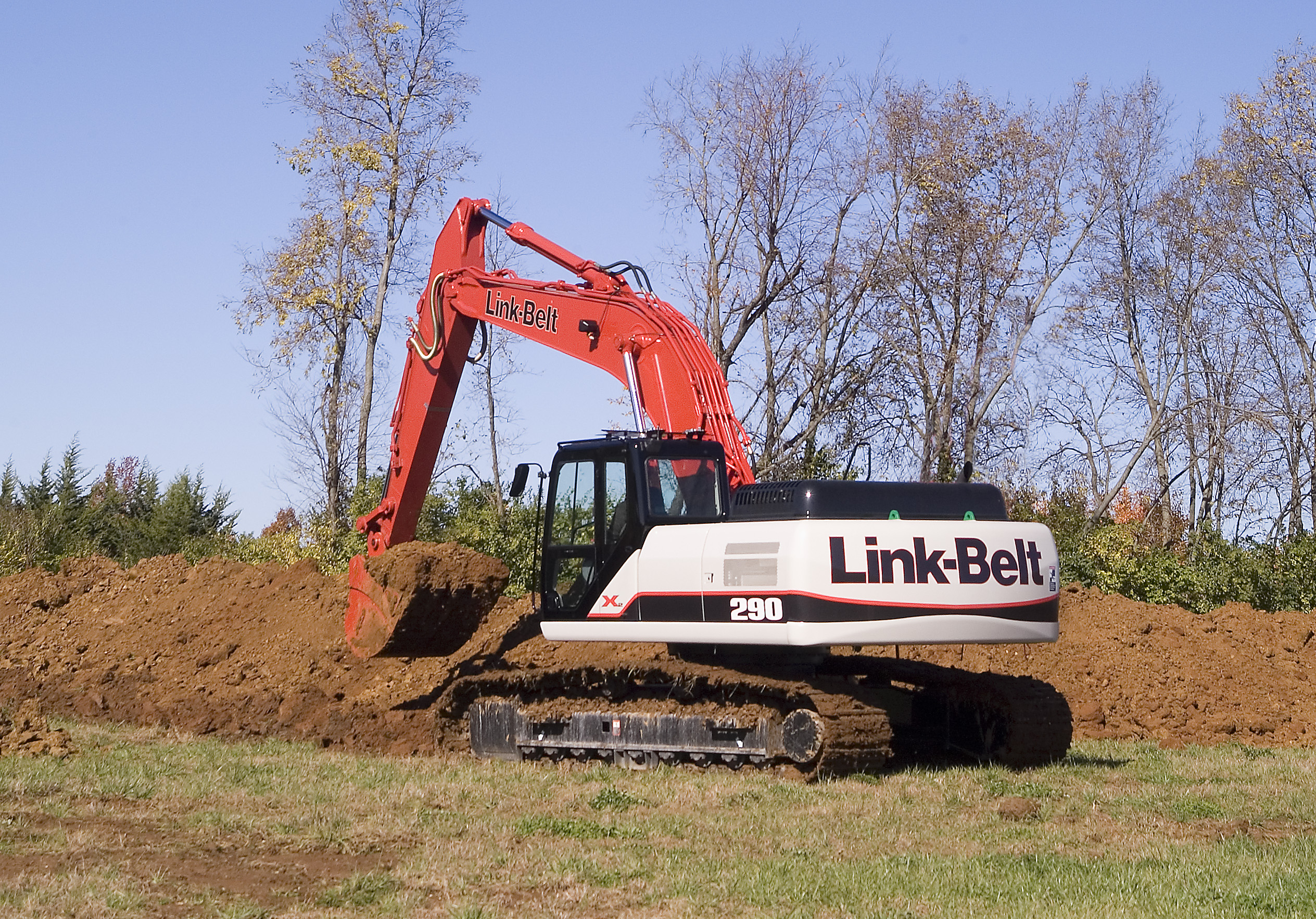
Link-Belt excavator trenching

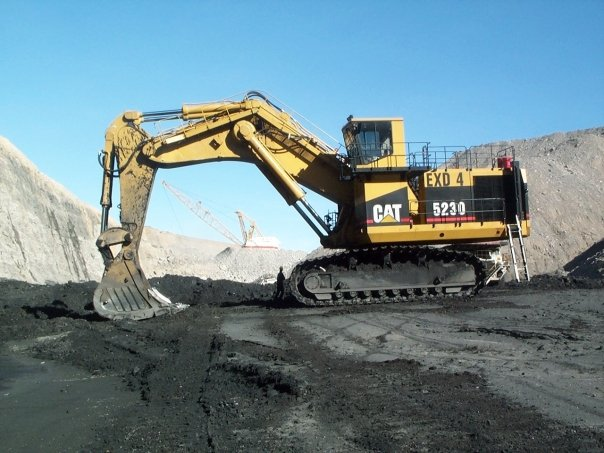
CAT 5230 in coal mining operation

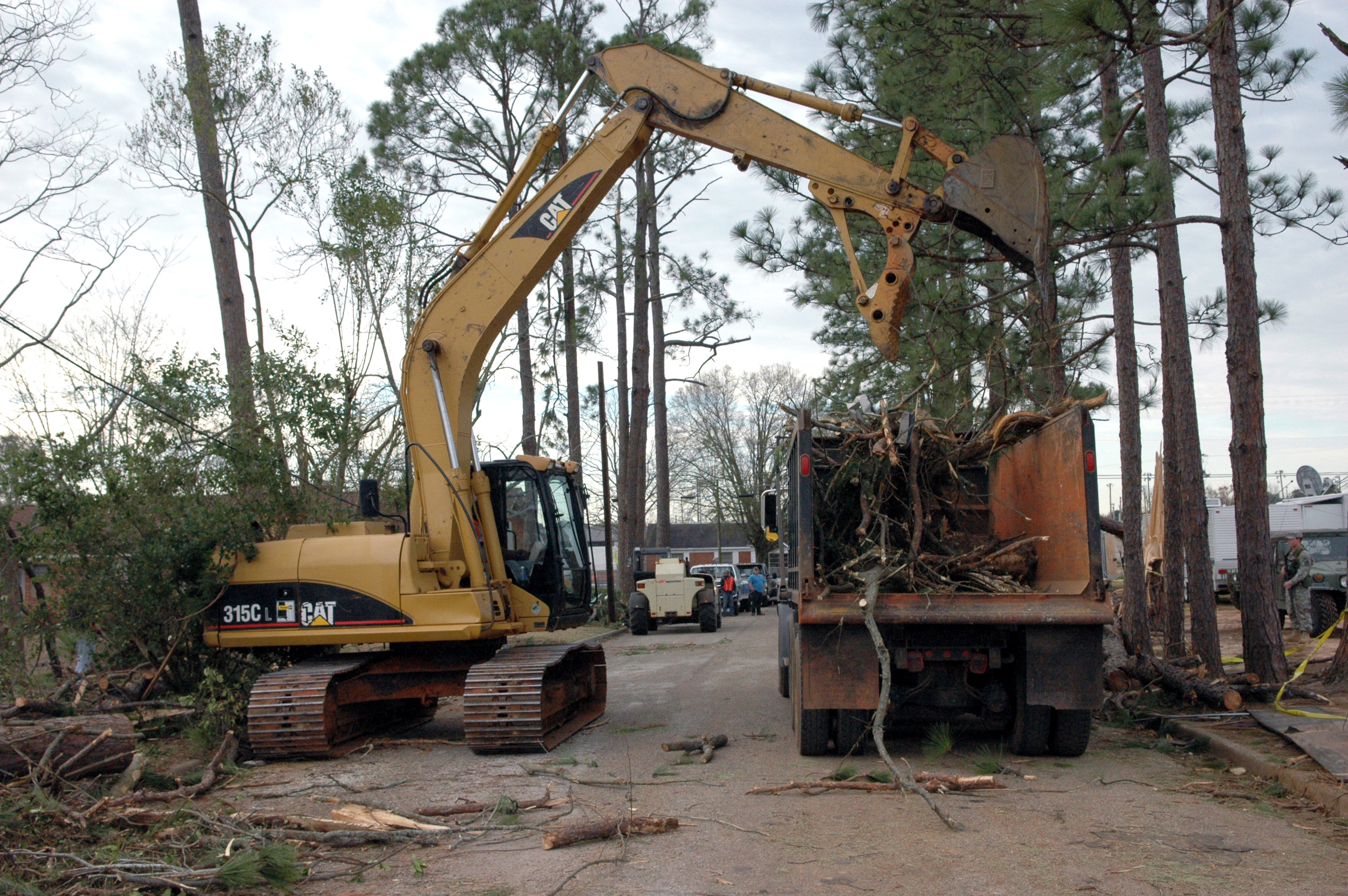
Caterpillar 315C L Excavator cleaning up tornado debris

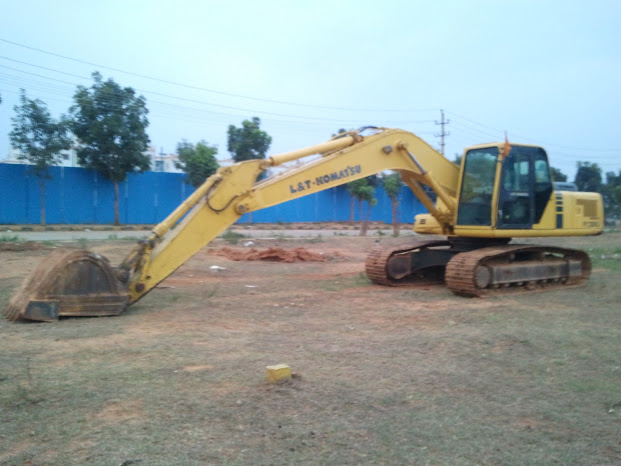
An L&T Komatsu excavator seen in India

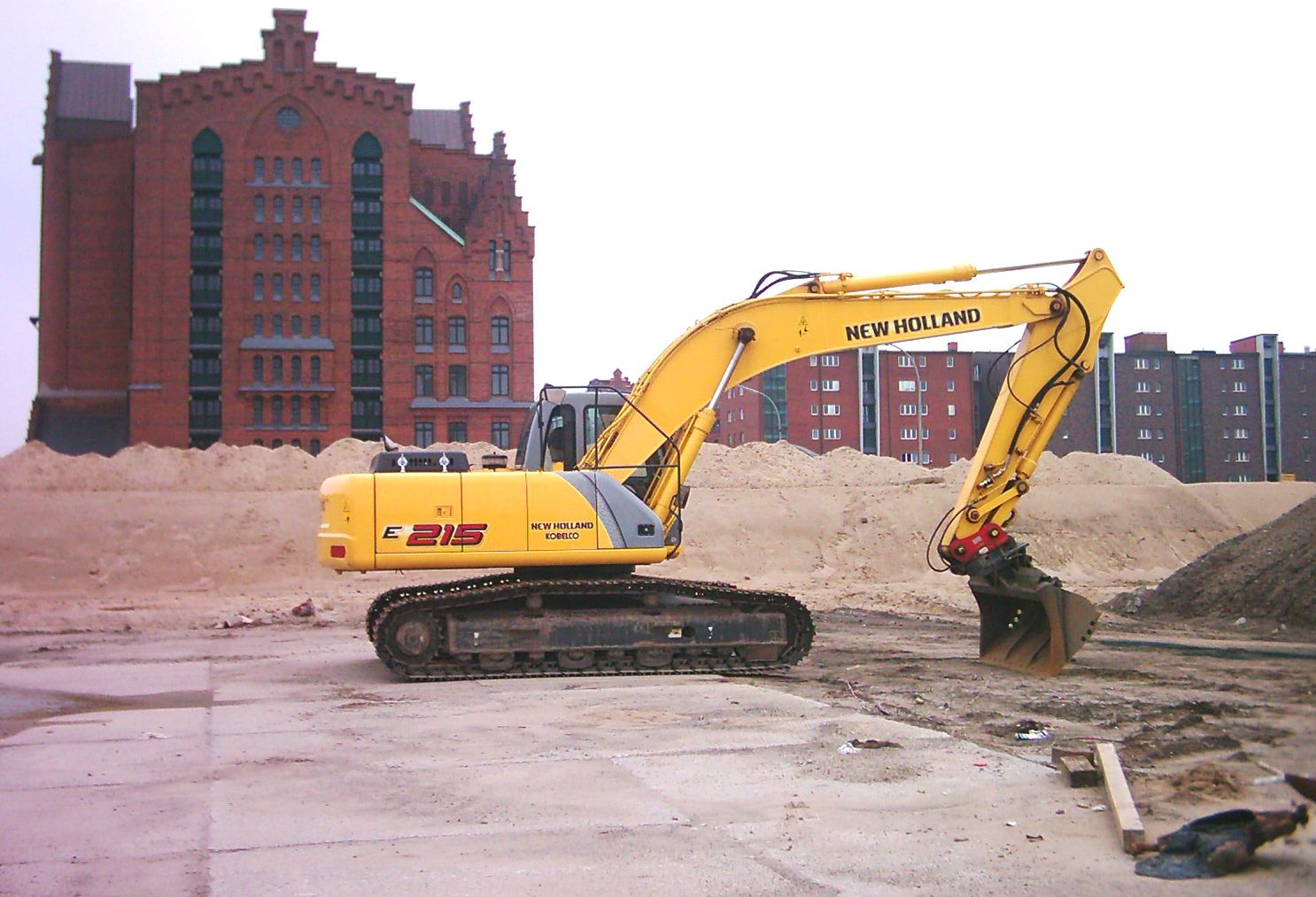
A New Holland E215 in Hamburg, Germany

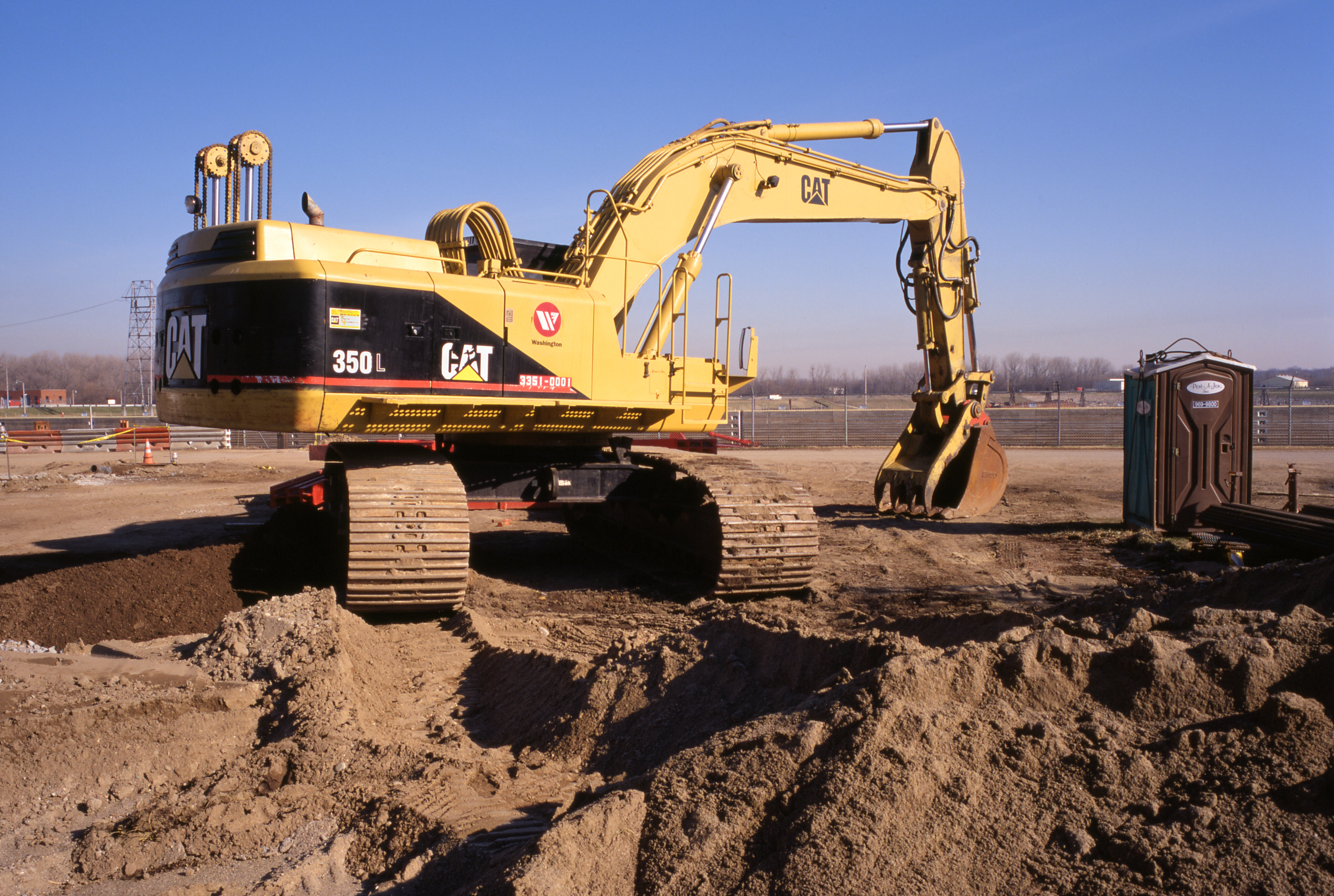
Caterpillar 350L excavator in Louisville, Kentucky, USA, 2001. Note the hydraulic thumb.

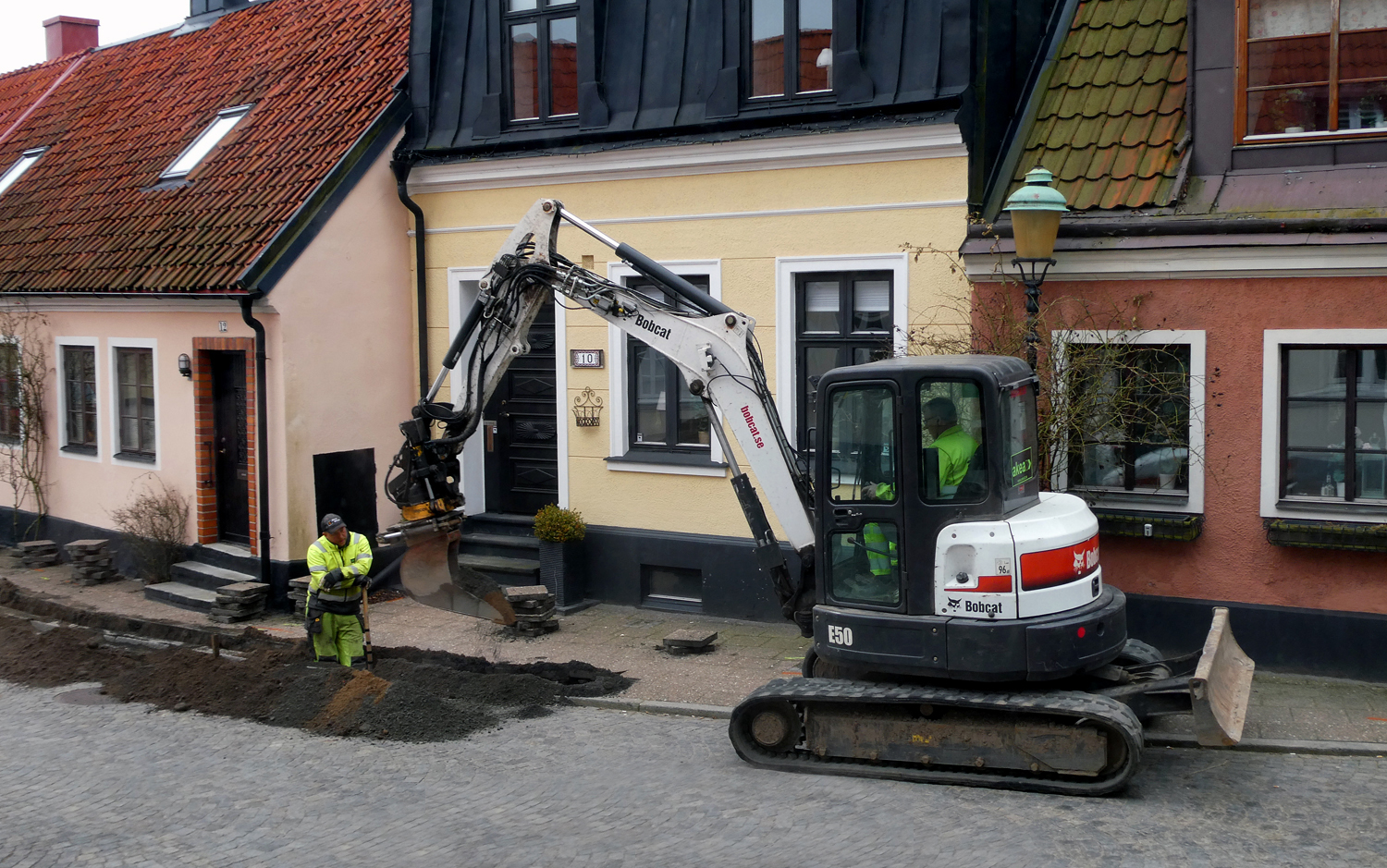
A smaller excavator is digging for the laying of a broadband cable in central Ystad in 2021

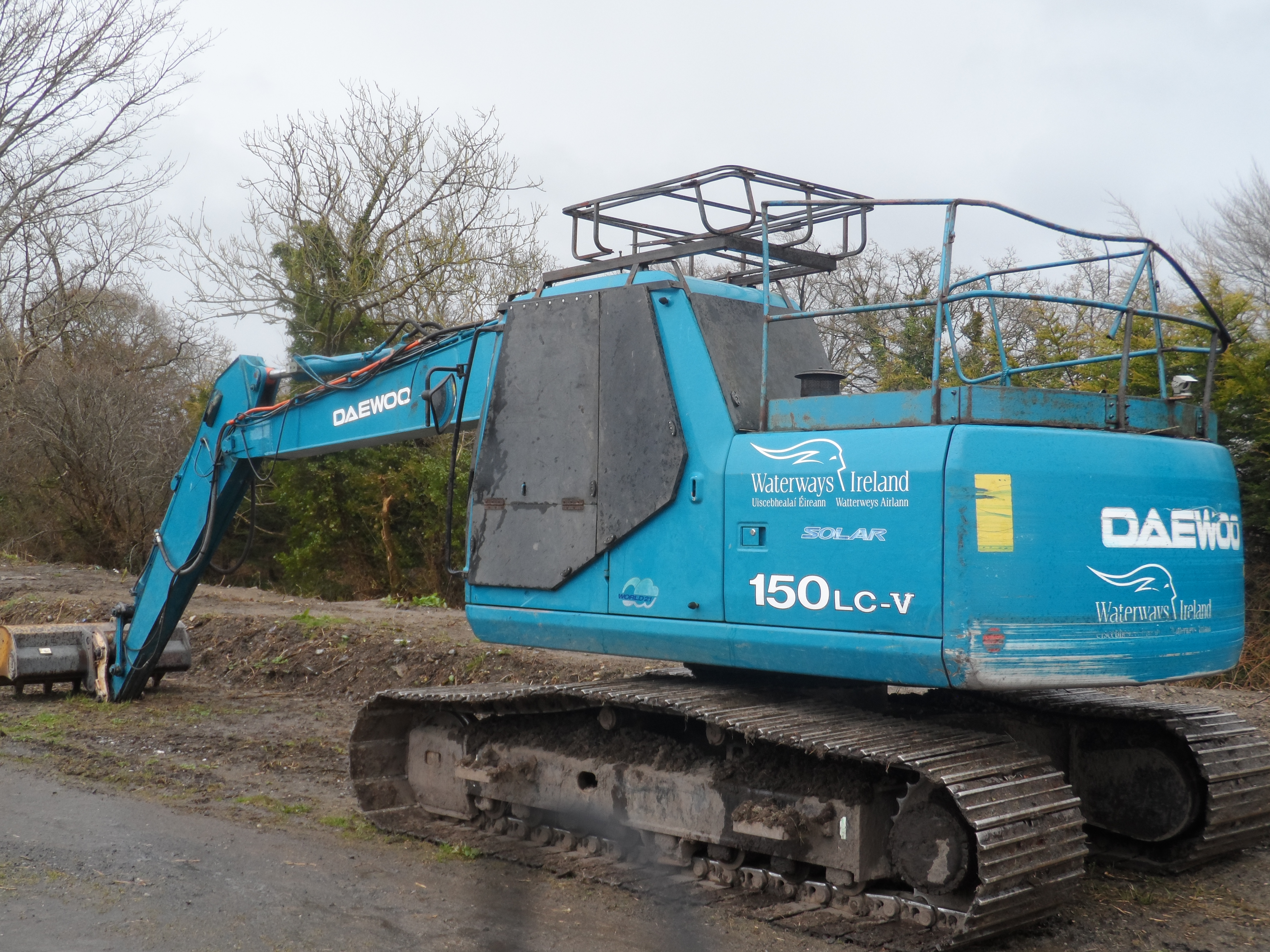
Waterways Ireland Daewoo Solar 150LC-V crawler excavator, used for canal maintenance

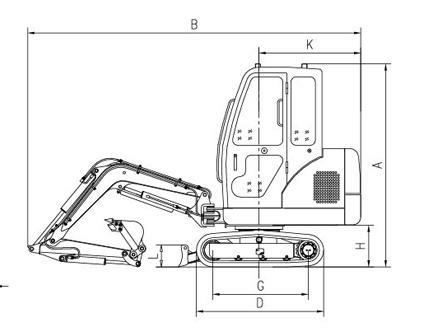
Crawler excavator

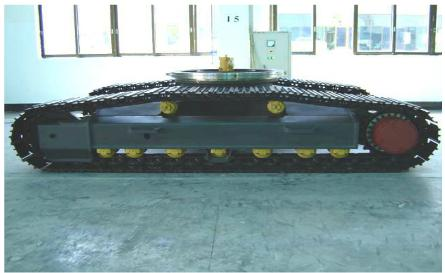
Crawler chassis

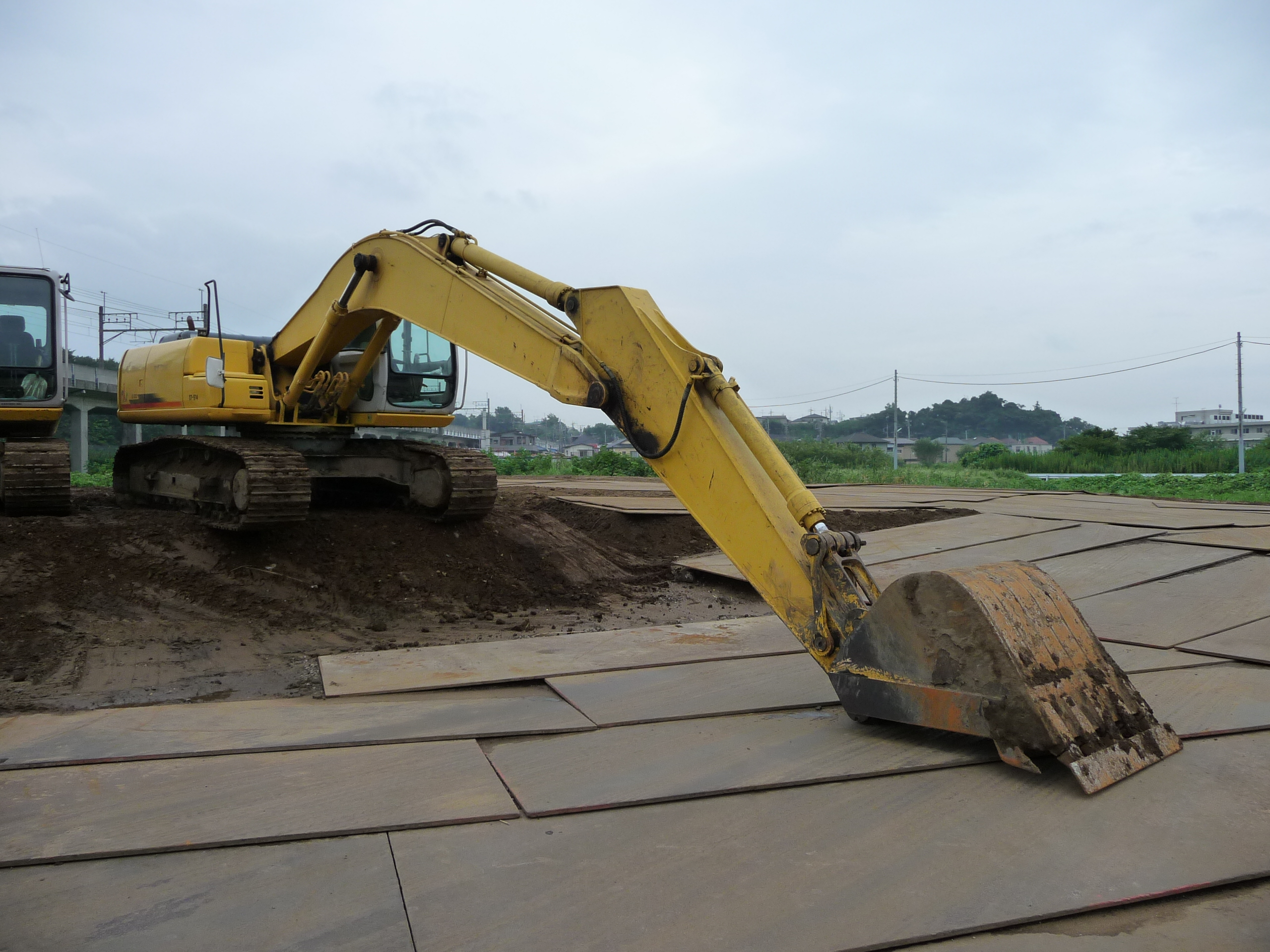
Excavator, SH200 Sumitomo, in storage/parking lot for 8-10 units in Chiba Japan in 2008

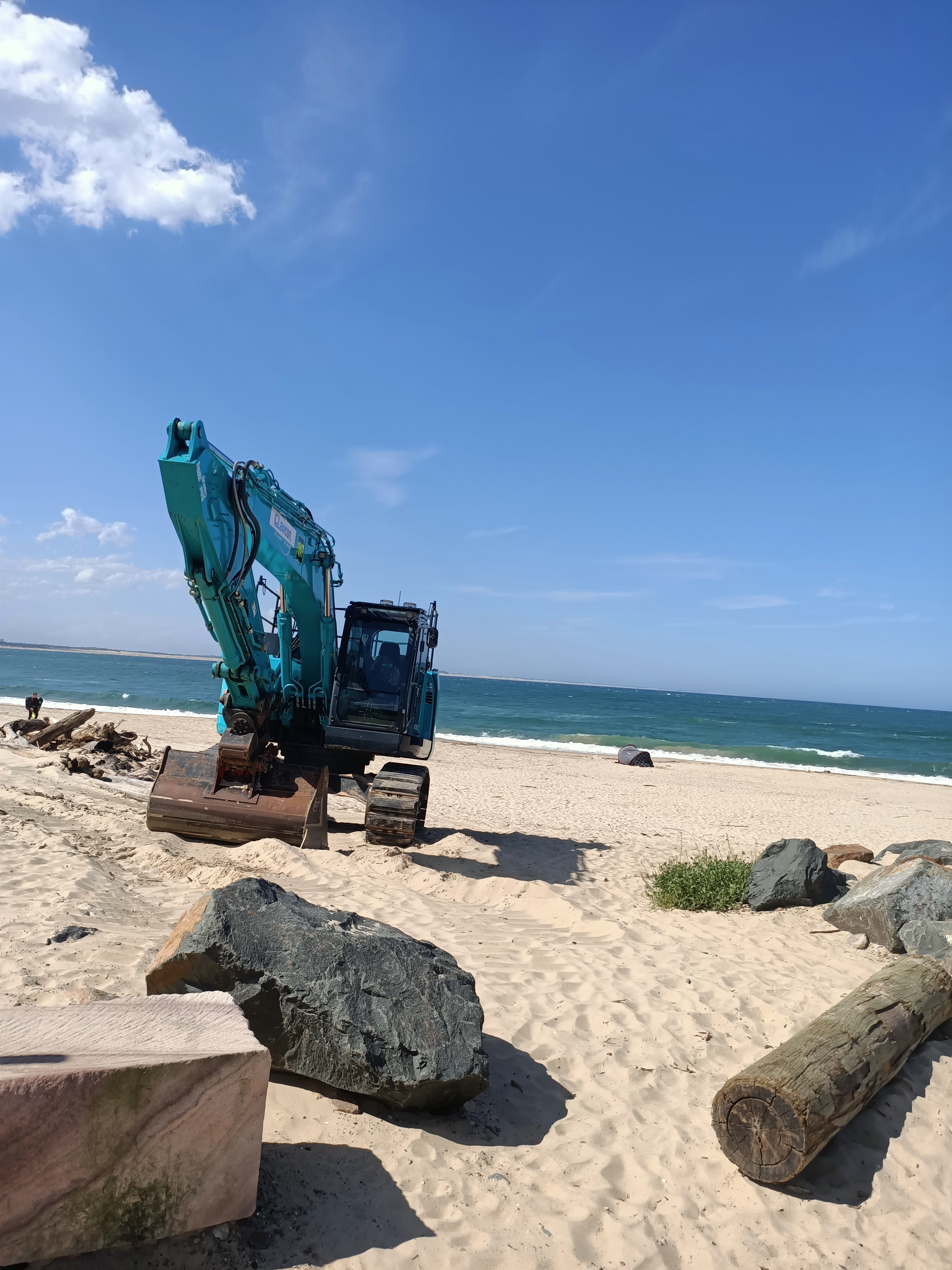
Excavator performing coastal maintenance and debris clearing at Stockton Beach

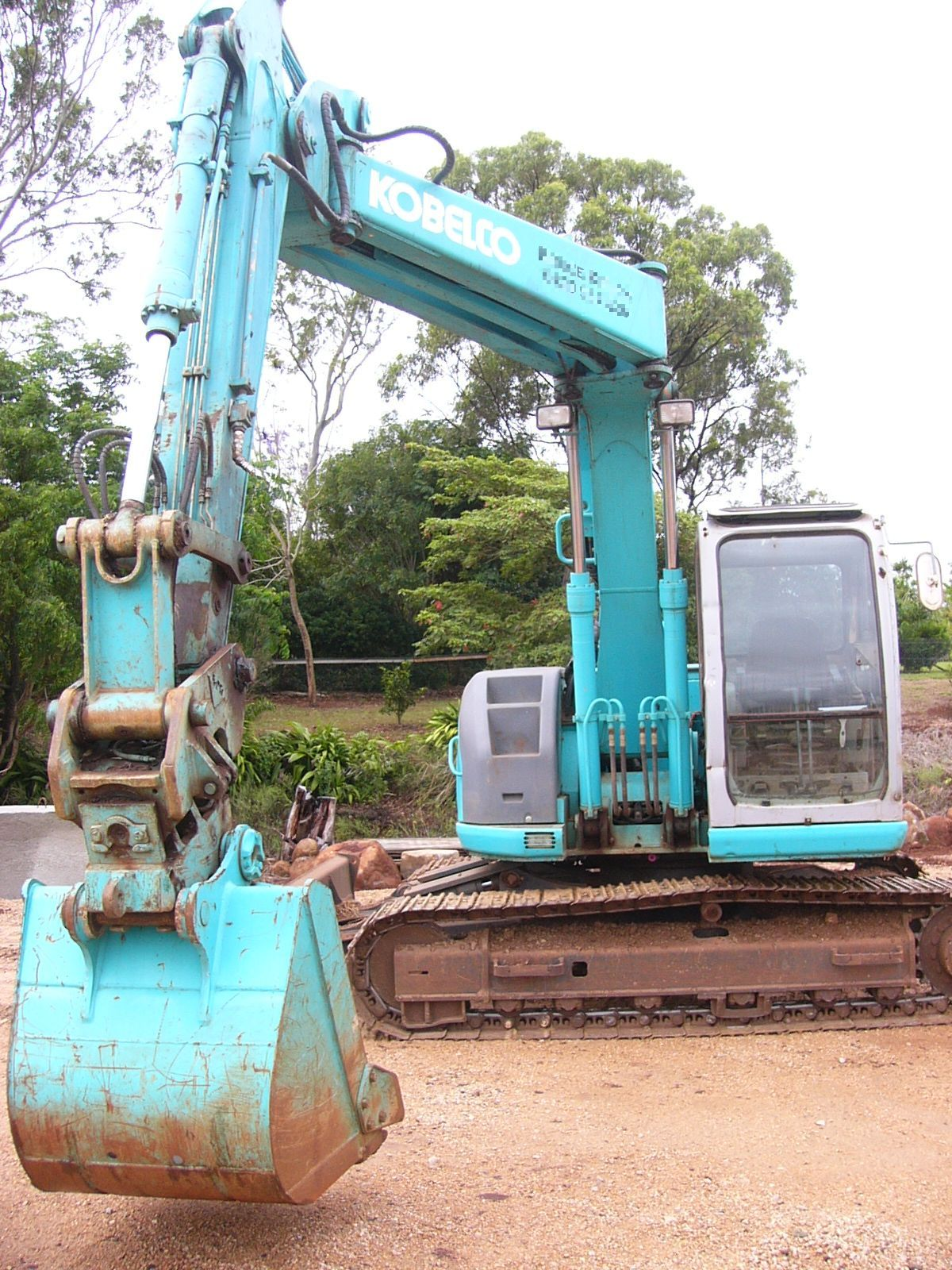
Knuckle boom seen on a tracked excavator, shown at the right extent of travel.

== Configurations ==
The principle of a hydraulic excavator

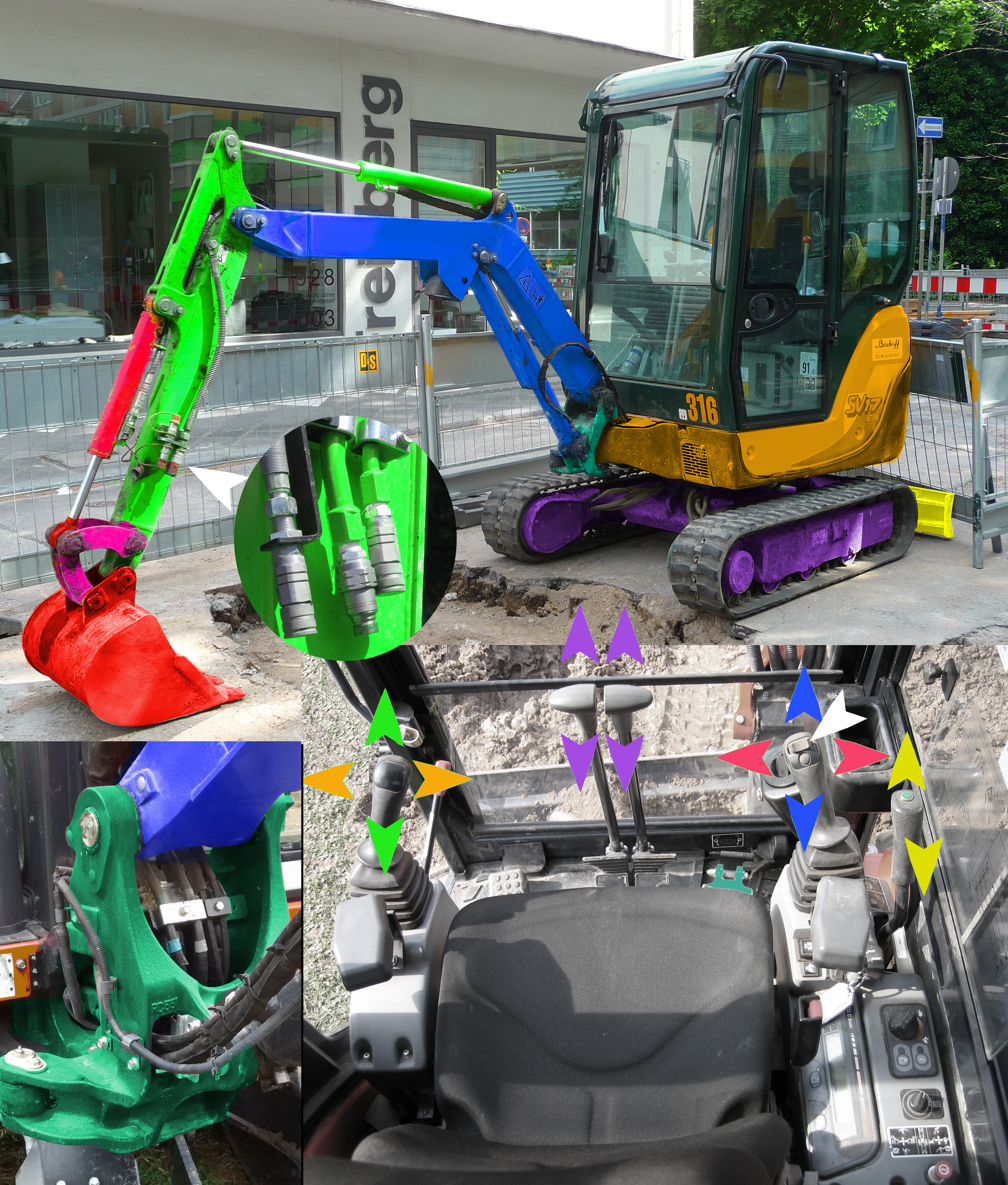
Hydraulic excavator controls illustration, color of the control matches the moving part

Modern hydraulic excavators come in a wide variety of sizes. The smaller ones are called mini or compact excavators. For example, Caterpillar's smallest mini-excavator weighs 2,060 pounds (930 kg) and has 13 hp; their largest model is the largest excavator available (developed and produced by the Orenstein & Koppel, Germany, until the takeover 2011 by Caterpillar, named »RH400«), the CAT 6090, which weighs in excess of 2,160,510 pounds (979,990 kg), has 4500 hp, and a bucket as large as 52.0 m^{3}.

Hydraulic excavators usually couple engine power to (commonly) three hydraulic pumps rather than to mechanical drivetrains. The two main pumps supply oil at high pressure (up to 5000 psi, 345 bar) for the arms, swing motor, track motors and accessories while the third is a lower pressure (≈700 psi, 48 bar) pump for pilot control of the spool valves; this third circuit allows for reduced physical effort when operating the controls. Generally, the three pumps used in excavators consist of two variable displacement piston pumps and a gear pump. The arrangement of the pumps in the excavator unit changes with different manufacturers using different formats.

The three main sections of an excavator are the undercarriage, the house and the arm. The boom, the front part that is attached to the house itself and holds the arm, is also used. The undercarriage includes tracks, track frame, and final drives, which have a hydraulic motor and gearing providing the drive to the individual tracks. The undercarriage, especially frequently for a mini-excavator, can also have blade similar to that of a bulldozer. The house includes the operator cab, counterweight, engine, fuel and hydraulic oil tanks. The house attaches to the undercarriage by way of a center pin. High-pressure oil is supplied to the tracks' hydraulic motors through a hydraulic swivel at the axis of the pin, allowing the machine to slew 360° unhindered and thus provides the left-and-right movement. The arm provides the up-and-down and closer-and-further (or digging movement) movements. Arms typically consist of a boom, stick and bucket with three joints between them and the house.

The boom attaches to the house and provides the up-and-down movement. It can be one of several different configurations:

- Most common are mono booms; these have no movement apart from straight up and down.
- Some others have a knuckle boom which can also move left and right in line with the machine.
- Another option is a hinge at the base of the boom allowing it to hydraulically pivot up to 180° independent to the house; however, this is generally available only to compact excavators.
- Variable angle booms have additional joint in the middle of the boom to change the curvature of the boom. These are also called triple-articulated booms (TAB) or 3 piece booms.

Attached to the end of the boom is the stick (or dipper arm). The stick provides the digging movement needed to pull the bucket through the ground. The stick length is optional depending whether reach (longer stick) or break-out power (shorter stick) is required. Most common is mono stick but there are also, for example, telescopic sticks. The largest form ever of an excavator, the dragline excavator, eliminated the dipper in favor of a line and winch.

On the end of the stick is usually a bucket. A wide, large capacity (mud) bucket with a straight cutting edge is used for cleanup and levelling or where the material to be dug is soft, and teeth are not required. A general purpose (GP) bucket is generally smaller, stronger, and has hardened side cutters and teeth used to break through hard ground and rocks. Buckets have numerous shapes and sizes for various applications. There are also many other attachments that are available to be attached to the excavator for boring, ripping, crushing, cutting, lifting, etc. Attachments can be attached with pins similar to other parts of the arm or with some variety of quick coupler. Excavators in Scandinavia often feature a tiltrotator which allows attachments rotate 360 degrees and tilt ±45 degrees, in order to increase the flexibility and precision of the excavator.

Before the 1990s, all excavators had a long or conventional counterweight that hung off the rear of the machine to provide more digging force and lifting capacity. This became a nuisance when working in confined areas. In 1993 Yanmar launched the world's first Zero Tail Swing excavator, which allows the counterweight to stay inside the width of the tracks as it slews, thus being safer and more user friendly when used in a confined space. This type of machine is now widely used throughout the world.

There are two main types of control configuration used in excavators to control the boom and bucket, each distributing the four primary digging functions across two x-y joysticks. This allows a skilled operator to control all four functions simultaneously. The most popular configuration in the US is the SAE controls configuration while in other parts of the world, the ISO control configuration is more common. Some manufacturers such as Takeuchi have switches that allow the operator to select which control configuration to use.

== Excavator attachments ==
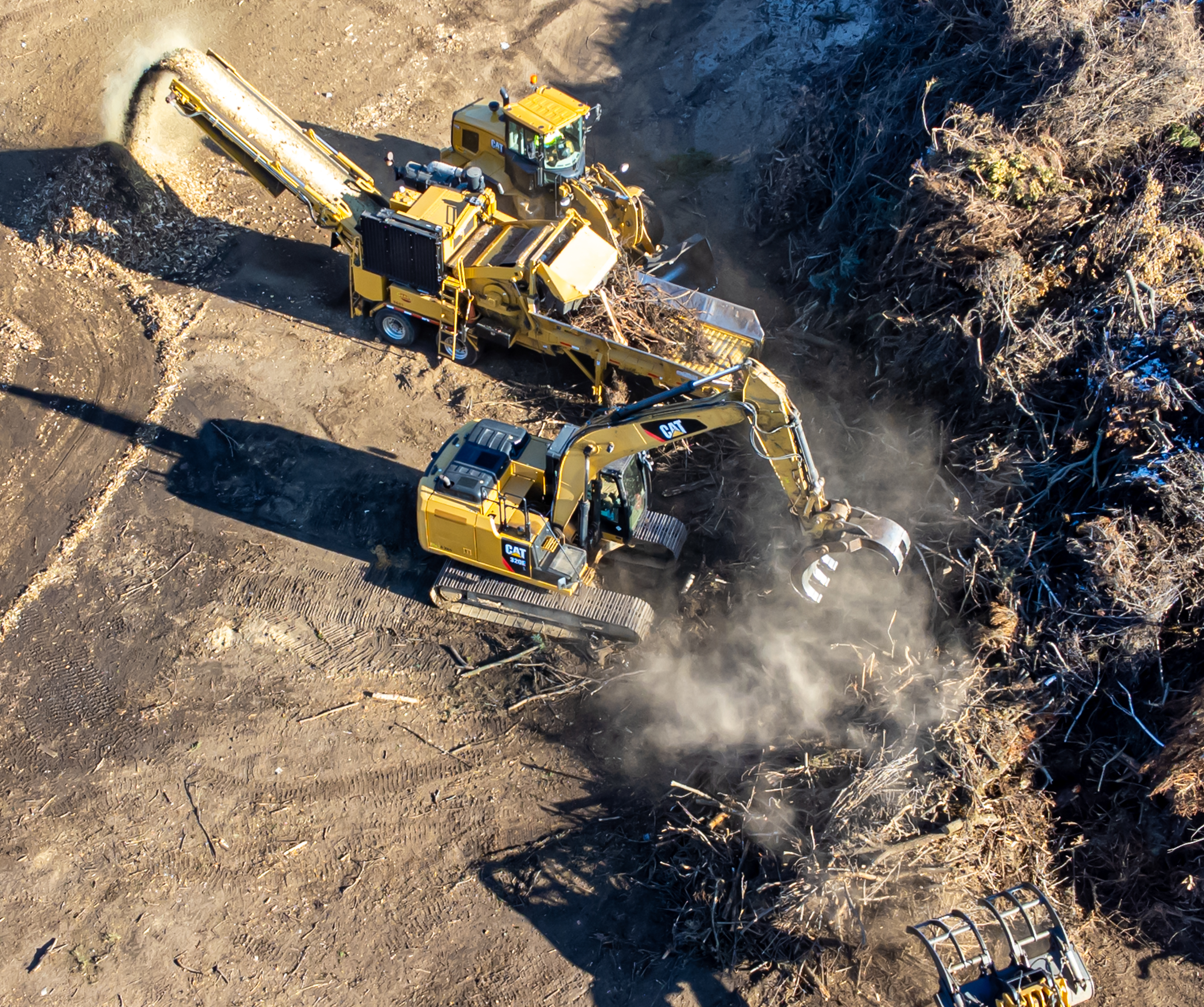
Excavator with grapple

Hydraulic excavators now perform tasks well beyond bucket excavation. With the advent of hydraulic-powered attachments such as a breaker, a cutter, a grapple or an auger, a crusher and screening buckets the excavator is frequently used in many applications other than excavation. Many excavators feature a quick coupler for simplified attachment mounting, increasing the machine's utilization on the jobsite. Excavators are usually employed together with loaders and bulldozers. Most wheeled, compact and some medium-sized (11 to 18-tonne) excavators have a backfill (or dozer) blade. This is a horizontal bulldozer-like blade attached to the undercarriage and is used for leveling and pushing removed material back into a hole.

=== Tiltrotator ===
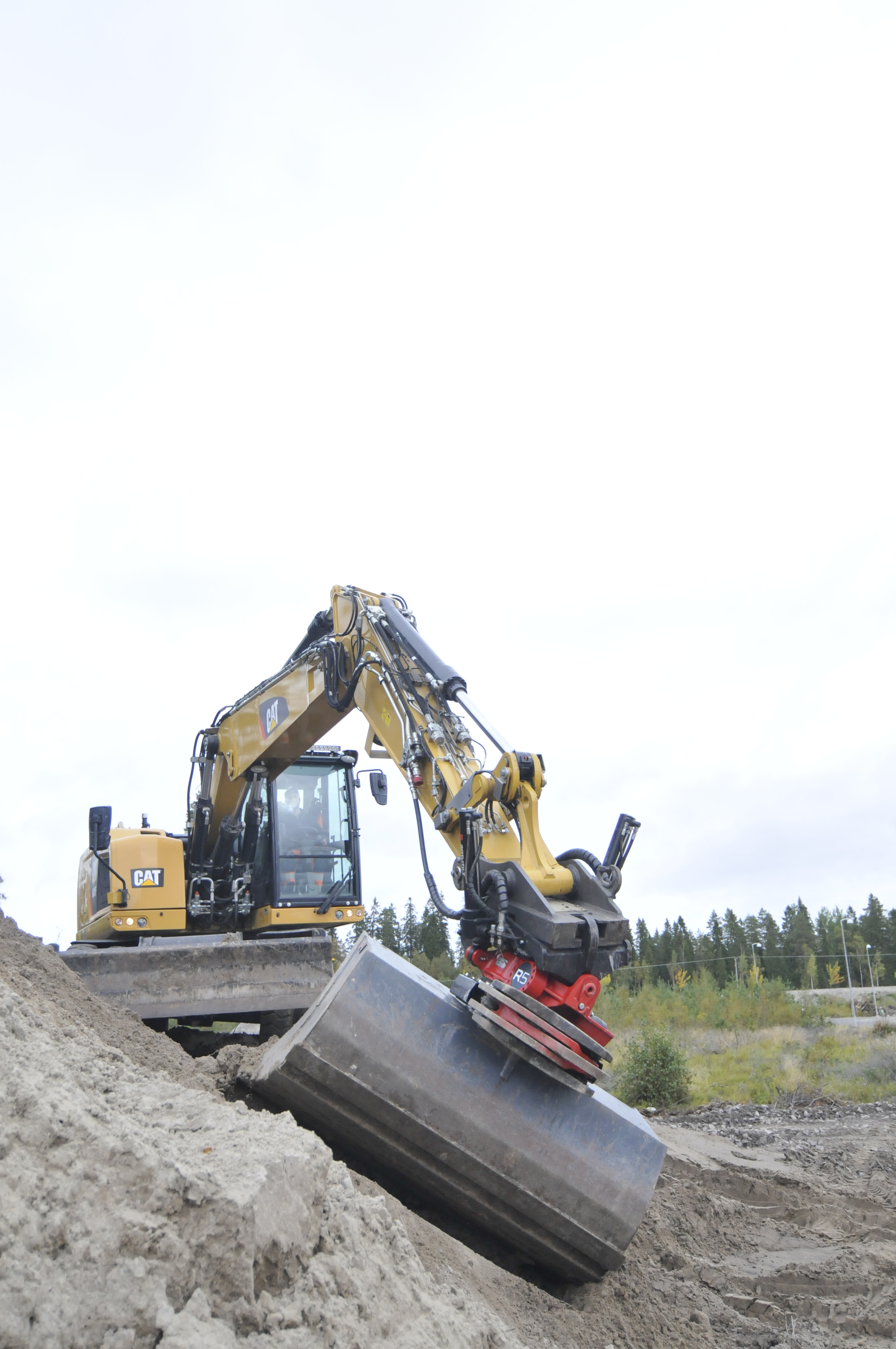
Tiltrotator at work

A tiltrotator (known under a number of trade names) is a hydraulic attachment/tool used on most excavators, and backhoes between 1,5 and 40 tons in the Nordic countries (Sweden, Finland, and Norway). A tiltrotator is mounted on the excavator such that the excavator bucket can be rotated through 360 degrees and one tilts +/- 45 degrees, in order to increase the flexibility and precision of the excavator. The Tiltrotator (also known as a Rototilt) was introduced to the market in Sweden in the early 1980s by the Norgrens under the family owned and operated company named Noreco, and has become the standard in Scandinavia. The concept has recently gained popularity in other countries such as the Netherlands, Germany, UK, Japan, Canada and United States.

A tiltrotator can best be described as a wrist between the arm of the excavator and bucket, or whatever other tool is fitted to the tiltrotator's quick coupler. With its integral quick coupler and rotary swivel, the tiltrotator can also use extra hydraulic functions to power and manipulate other worktools below it such as a breaker, grapple or an auger, which can be attached to the quickcoupler on the tiltrotator, for simplified attachment mounting, dramatically increasing the excavator's utilization on the jobsite. Control systems which allows the operator to operate the machine fully through the joysticks. Recognized control systems are SVAB, ICS by Rototilt, Engcon Microprop DC2 and Steelwrist XControl G2. The tiltrotator is nowadays controlled through machines two or four electro-proportionally controlled hydraulic lines.

== Notable manufacturers ==
- 14. oktobar
- Atlas
- Bobcat Company
- Bucyrus International
- Case Construction Equipment
- Caterpillar
- CNH Global
- Doosan Infracore (formerly Daewoo Heavy Industries & Machinery) - including Solar brand
- ENMTP
- Fiatallis
- Ford
- HEPCO
- Hidromek
- Hitachi Construction Machinery
- Hydrema
- Hyundai Heavy Industries
- International Harvester
- JCB
- John Deere
- Kobelco - subsidiary organization of Kobe Steel, also producing Kobelco
- Komatsu
- Kubota
- Larsen & Toubro - subsidiary with Komatsu, operated as L&T Komatsu for Indian market
- Liebherr
- LBX (Link-Belt) Excavators
- LiuGong
- Lonking
- Mahindra
- Marion Power Shovel Company - ceased operations in 1997
- Massey Ferguson
- Mitsubishi Heavy Industries - the excavator market was fully owned by Caterpillar Inc.
- New Holland
- Orenstein & Koppel (O&K) - ceased operations in 1999
- Poclain
- Samsung→The business was bought by Volvo Construction Equipment
- Sandvik Mining and Construction
- Sany
- SDLG - subsidiary corporation of Volvo Construction Equipment
- Shantui
- St Kinetics
- Sumitomo Heavy Industries
- Takeuchi
- Tata Hitachi Construction Machinery - owned by Hitachi Construction Machinery for Indian market
- Terex Corporation
- ThyssenKrupp
- Uralvagonzavod
- Volvo Construction Equipment
- Wacker Neuson
- XCMG
- Yanmar
- Zoomlion

== Current manufacturers ==
As of July 2021, current excavator manufacturers include:

Algeria
- ENMTP

China

- Guangxi Yuchai Heavy Industry Co., Ltd.
- LiuGong
- Lonking
- Lovol Heavy Industry Group Co., Ltd
- SANY
- SDLG
- Shantui
- Sunward Intelligent Equipment Group
- XCMG
- Xiamen XGMA Machinery Co., Ltd.
- Zoomlion

Denmark

- Hydrema

France

- JMEKA
- Mecalac
- Mini-pelle
- ProtoMicroTP

Germany

- ThyssenKrupp
- Wacker Neuson

India

- BEML
- L&T
- Tata Hitachi Construction Machinery

Indonesia

- PT Pindad (Persero)

Iran

- HEPCO

Italy-USA-Netherlands

- CNH Industrial - produces Sumitomo and CASE

Japan

- Hitachi Construction Machinery
- Kato Works Co. Ltd.
- Kobelco
- Komatsu
- Kubota
- SUMITOMO
- Yanmar

Russia

- Uralvagonzavod

Sweden

- Sandvik AB
- Volvo Construction Equipment

South Korea

- Doosan
- Hyundai Heavy Industries

Switzerland-Germany

- Liebherr

Turkey

- Hidromek

United Kingdom

- JCB

United States

- Bucyrus International
- Case CE
- Caterpillar Inc.
- John Deere
- LBX (Link-Belt) Excavators
- New Holland
- Terex Corporation

== See also ==
=== Types of excavator ===
- Amphibious excavator
- Bucket-wheel excavator
- Compact excavator
- Crawler Excavator
- Dragline excavator
- Long reach excavator
- Power shovel
- Steam shovel
- Suction excavator
- Walking excavator

=== Other ===
- Bulldozer
- Civil engineering
- Feller buncher
- Heavy equipment
- Loader
- Mining simulation
- SAE controls
- Skid-steer loader
- Tractor
