= Excavator controls =

System for operating digging machinery

Excavator controls specifies ways of how a human operator controls the digging components (i.e. swing, boom, stick, bucket) of a piece of heavy machinery, such as a backhoe or an excavator.

== ISO controls ==
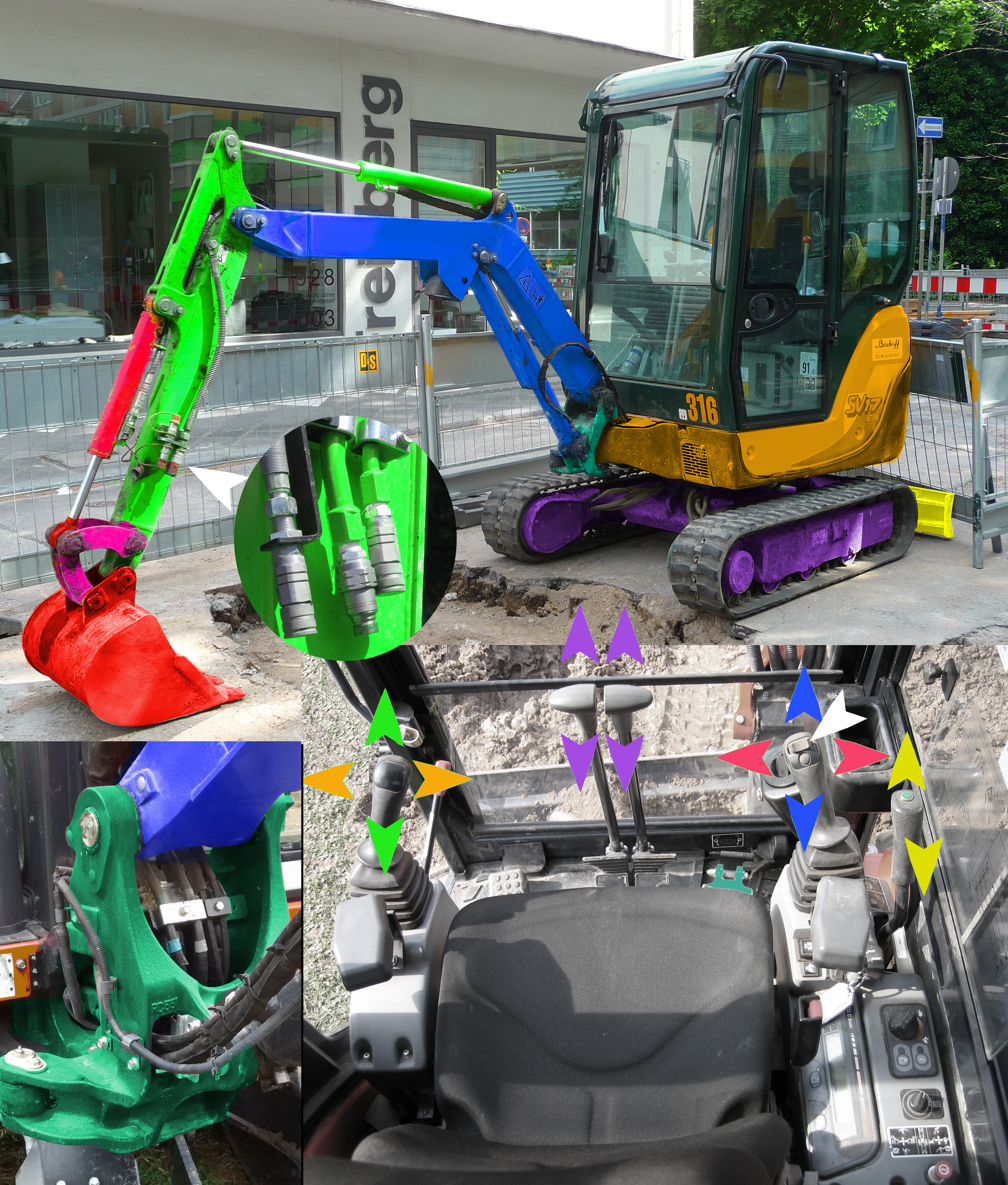
ISO excavator controls illustration, color of the control matches the moving part. Additionally there is a switch on the right hand joystick to operate attached tools.

The most commonly used control pattern throughout the world is the ISO controls. In the ISO control pattern, the left hand joystick controls Swing (left & right) and the Stick Boom (away & close), and the right hand joystick controls the Main Boom (up & down) and Bucket motions (close & dump). This control pattern is standardised in ISO 10968 and SAE J1177.

- Left hand left = Swing left.
- Left hand right = Swing right.
- Left hand forward = Stick Boom (Dipper) away.
- Left hand back = Stick Boom (Dipper) close.
- Right hand left = Bucket curl in (closed)
- Right hand right = Bucket curl out (dump)
- Right hand forward = Main Boom down.
- Right hand back = Main Boom up.

== SAE controls ==
Beside ISO, the SAE controls is one of the most common control patterns in the United States. It differs from the ISO control pattern only in that SAE controls exchange the hands that control the boom and the stick. This control pattern is standardized in J1814.

In the SAE control pattern, the left hand joystick controls Swing (left & right) and the Main Boom (up &down), and the right hand joystick controls the Stick Boom(away & close) and Bucket motions (close & dump).

- Left hand left = Swing left.
- Left hand right = Swing right.
- Left hand forward = Main Boom down.
- Left hand back = Main Boom up.
- Right hand left = Bucket curl in (closed)
- Right hand right = Bucket curl out (dump)
- Right hand forward = Stick Boom (Dipper) away.
- Right hand back = Stick Boom (Dipper) close.

Some excavators have the possibility to change the operating mode from SAE to ISO and from ISO to SAE.

== See also ==
- Society of Automotive Engineers
