= LiuGong =

Chinese construction equipment manufacturer

Guangxi LiuGong Machinery Co., Ltd.
- Type: Public
- Traded as: SZSE: 000528
- Industry: Conglomerate
- Predecessor: Liuzhou Construction Machinery Factory
- Founded: 1958
- Headquarters: Liuzhou, China
- Key people: Wang Xiaohua (Chairman); Zeng Guang'an (Vice Chairman and President)
- Products: Road machinery, Mining equipment, Industrial machinery, Concrete Machinery, Port machinery, Coal mining machinery, Pile driving machinery
- Revenue: CNY 17,798 million (FY 2011)
- Operating income: CNY 1,676 million (FY 2011)
- Net income: CNY 1,321 million (FY 2011)
- Number of employees: Approximately 11,000
- Subsidiaries: Dressta
- Website: https://www.liugong.com/en/

LiuGong
- Simplified Chinese: 广西柳工机械股份有限公司
- Literal meaning: Guangxi LiuGong Machinery Co., Ltd.
Transcriptions
Standard Mandarin
- Hanyu Pinyin: Guǎngxi Liǔgōng Jīxiè Gǔfèn Yǒuxiàn Gōngsī

LiuGong, officially Guangxi LiuGong Machinery Co., Ltd., is a Chinese multinational construction machinery manufacturing company headquartered in Liuzhou, China. It is the world's 10th-largest construction equipment manufacturer by market share and the world's largest manufacturer of wheel loaders.

LiuGong was founded in 1958 in Liuzhou. Its products include wheel loaders, bulldozers, skid steer loaders, forklifts, motor graders, excavators, long reach excavators, rollers, truck mounted and crawler cranes, pavers, mini excavators, drilling machines, mining dump trucks, concrete equipment, and cold planners. It is listed on the Shenzhen Stock Exchange.

== History ==
LiuGong manufactured China's first modernized wheel loader in 1966 and in 1976 produced its first articulated and oversized wheel loaders. In 1993, it became China's first publicly traded construction equipment company. Then, to take advantage of western technologies, it entered into a joint venture with the German transmission manufacturer ZF in 1995, a partnership that continues today. In 2000, LiuGong acquired Jiangyin Roller Company, and soon after, continued to expand its product offering to include a total of 12 different product lines. These lines include a full array of construction equipment and specialized machines such as materials handling equipment and mobilized cranes. Today, LiuGong offers 19 different product lines.

In February 2012 LiuGong acquired Huta Stalowa Wola construction machines division and Dressta Co, Ltd. in Stalowa Wola, Poland.

== Operations ==
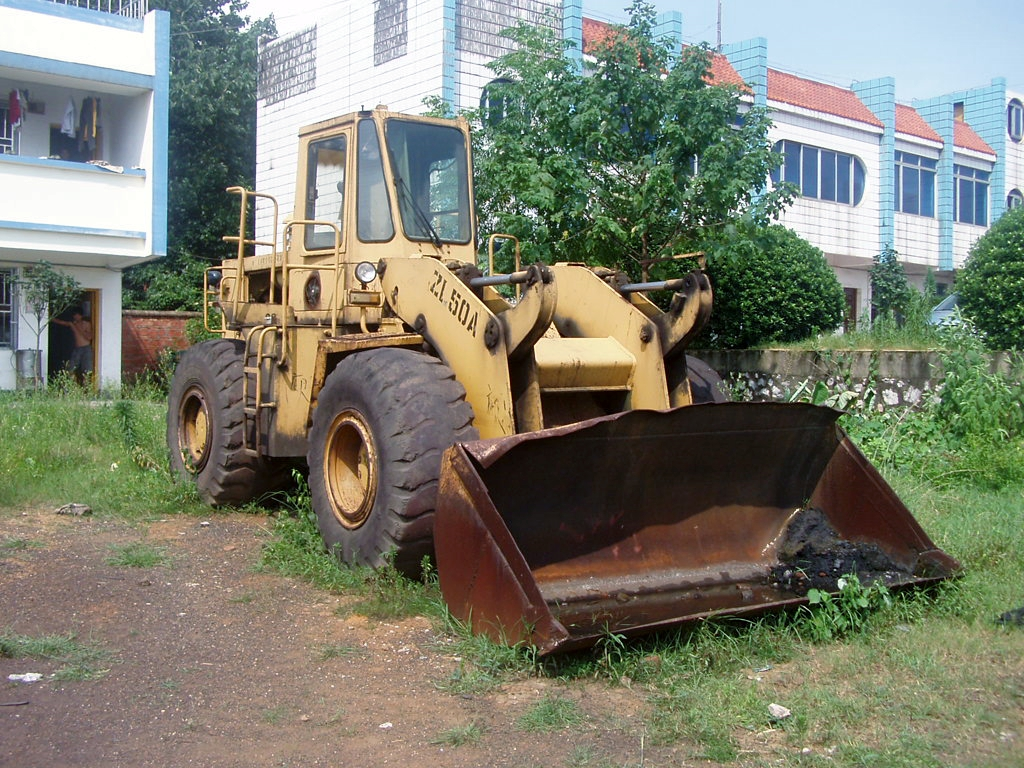
LiuGong ZL50A in Guilin East Railway Station

LiuGong employs over 11,000 people worldwide, and has 24 manufacturing facilities and around 2,650 sales outlets and 380 dealers. Supporting its dealer network are 10 regional offices with engineering, marketing, and service support, coupled with 10 parts depots located worldwide. LiuGong has subsidiary companies based in Johannesburg, South Africa; Sydney, Australia; Belo Horizonte, Brazil; Dubai; Europe; New Delhi, India; Stalowa Wola, Poland; Singapore; Moscow, Russia; Jakarta, Indonesia; Houston, United States and Tashkent, Uzbekistan.

== Joint ventures ==
=== Guangxi Cummins Industrial Power ===
On 20 October 2011 LiuGong and Cummins Inc. signed a joint-venture agreement to build a new mid-range engine manufacturing facility in Liuzhou, Guangxi Province, southern China. The joint-venture, named Guangxi Cummins Industrial Power Co., Ltd., was planned to commence production of engines meeting Tier 2 and Tier 3 emissions by 2013. The engines will be fully localized in China. They have developed a new 9.3-Liter engine, and it is scheduled for production soon.

=== Liuzhou ZF Machinery ===
Liuzhou ZF Machinery Co., Ltd. is a joint venture between LiuGong (49%) and ZF Friedrichshafen of Germany (51%) which manufactures driveline and parts of driveline for construction machinery. Ratified by the People's Government of Guangxi, both shareholders signed the JV Contract in the Great Hall of the People, Beijing, on 12 December 1995, and the business license was approved in the same year.

=== Beijing Capital Steel Heavy Duty Truck ===
LiuGong holds a 42% stake in Beijing Capital Steel Heavy Duty Truck Co. Ltd, which is a subsidiary of Beijing Capital Steel Mining Co. The terms of the acquisition of the stake were not disclosed.

== Products ==
LiuGong's products include wheel loaders, bulldozers, skid steer loaders, forklifts, motor graders, excavators, rollers, truck mounted and crawler cranes, pavers, mini excavators, drilling machines, mining dump trucks, concrete equipment, and cold planners.

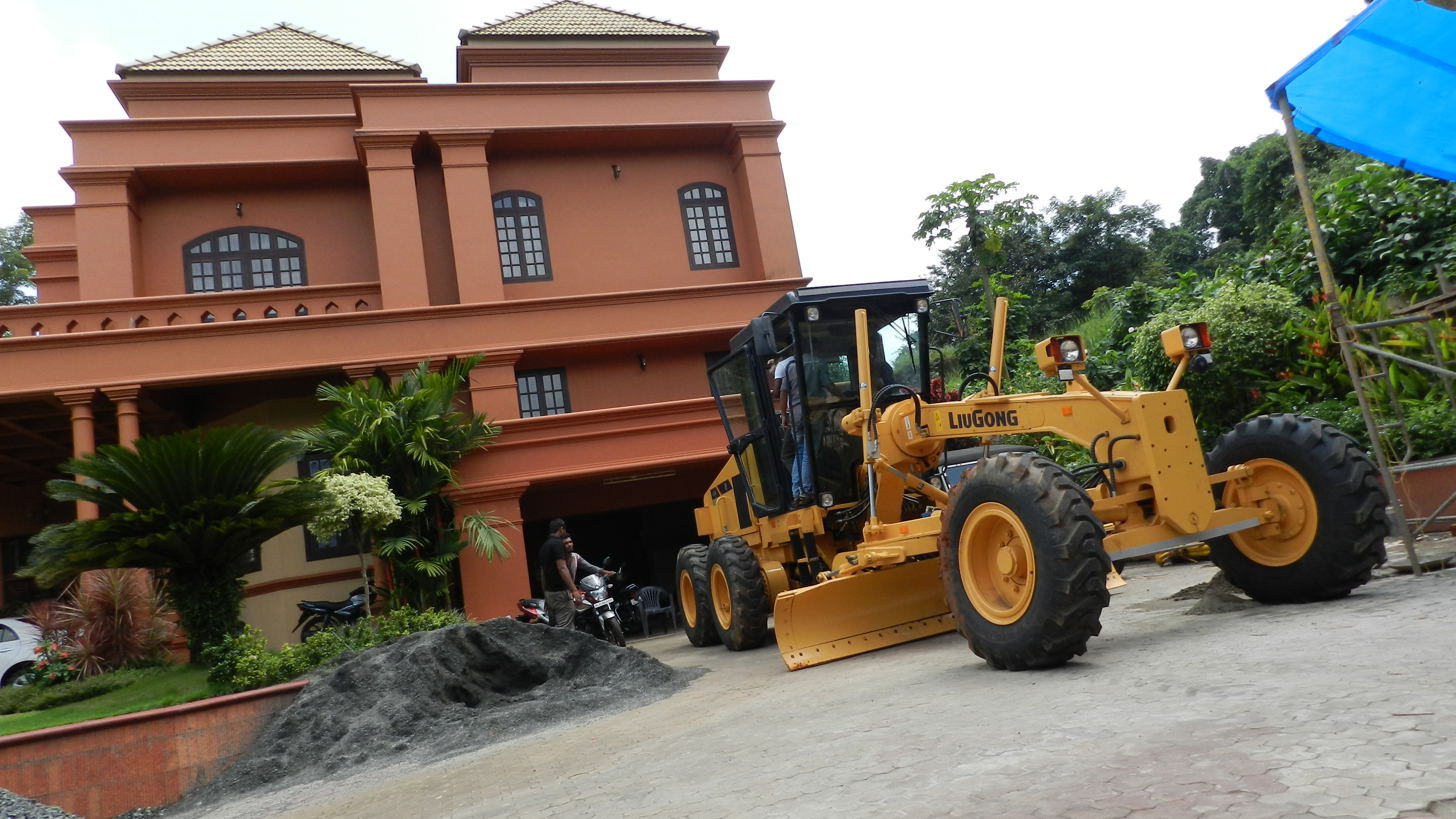
A LiuGong CLG414BSIII grader in use in Kerala, India

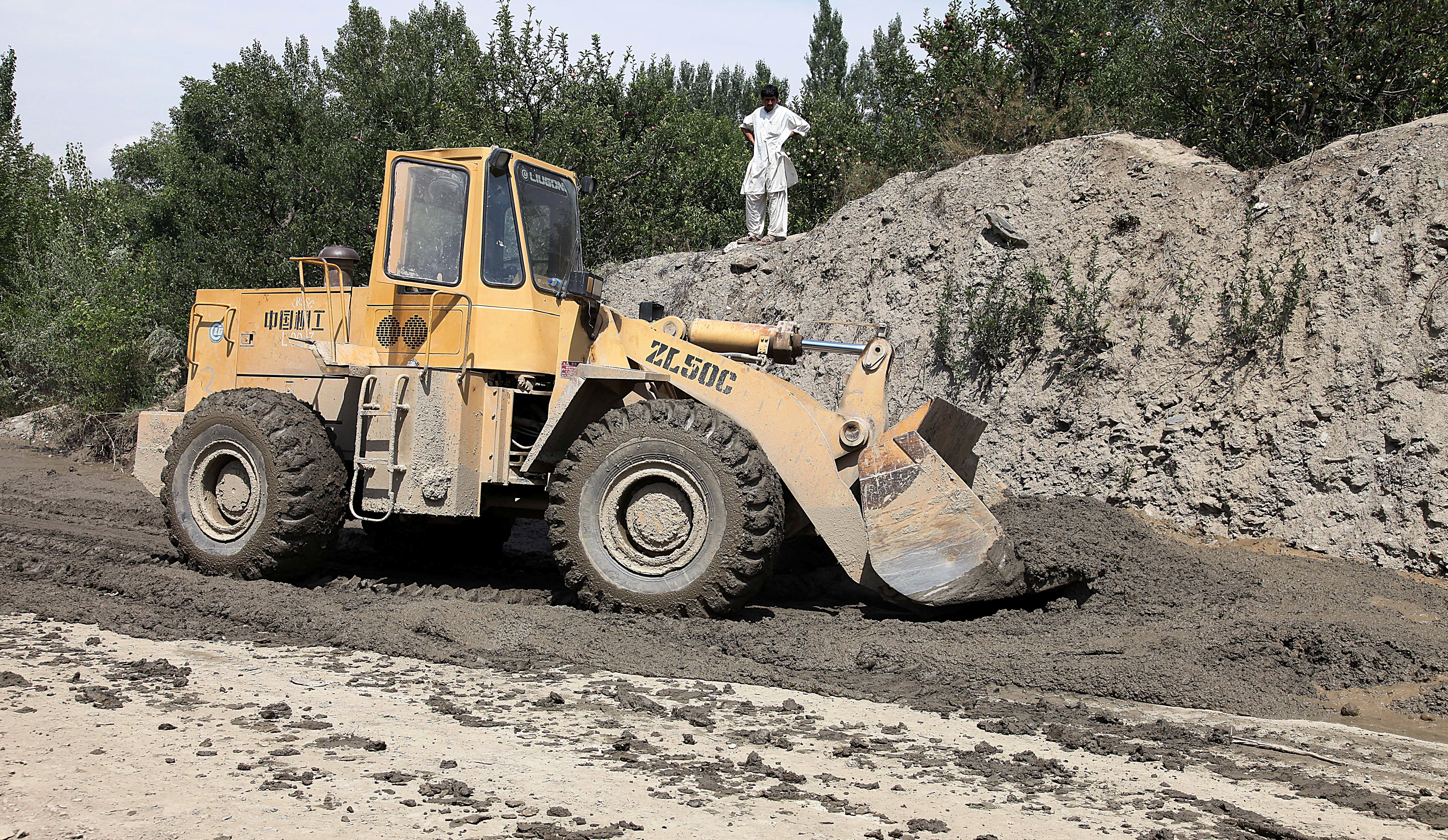
A LiuGong ZL50C wheel loader in Wardak Province, Afghanistan.

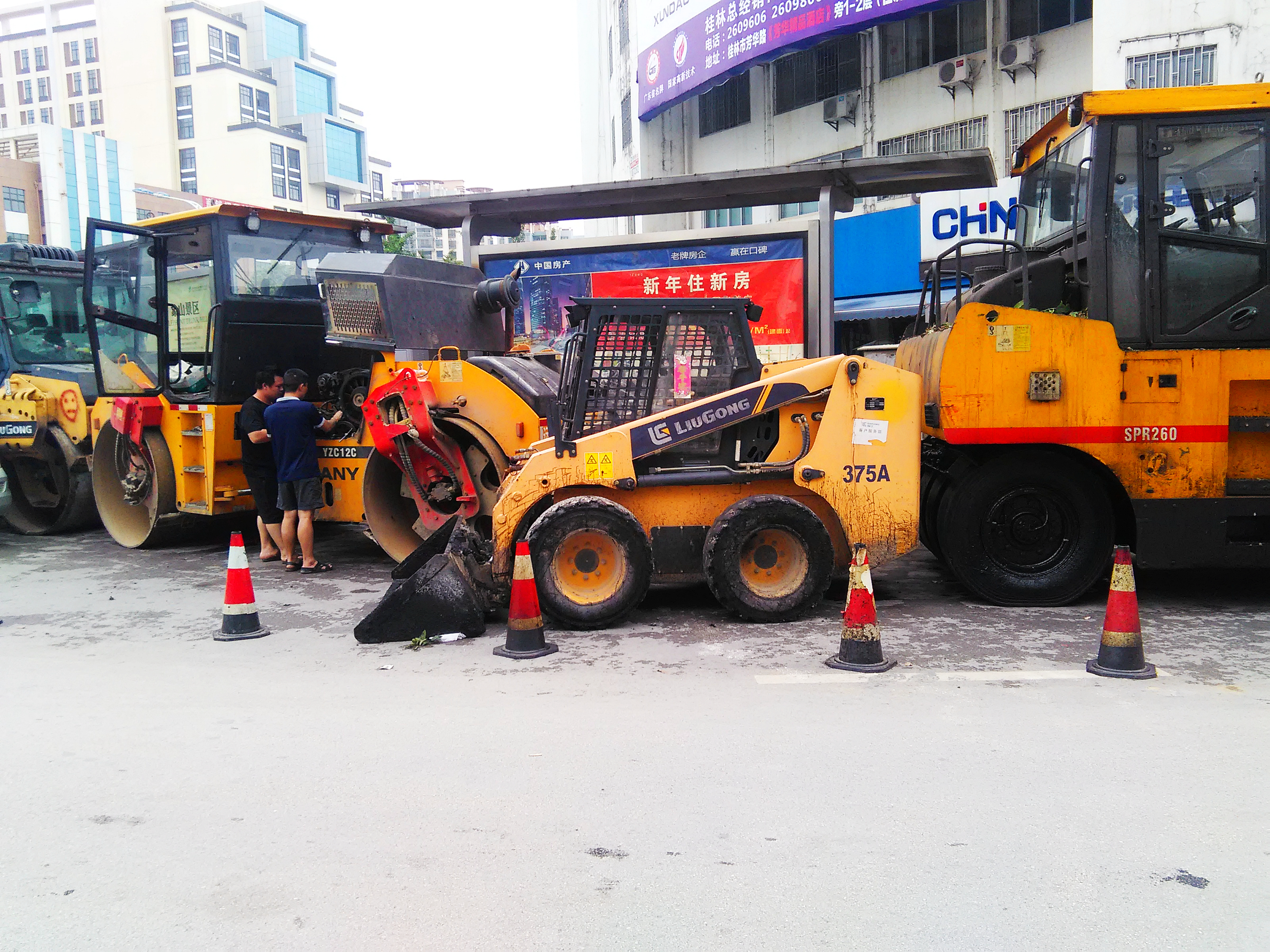
A LiuGong 375A skid-steer loader in Guilin, China.

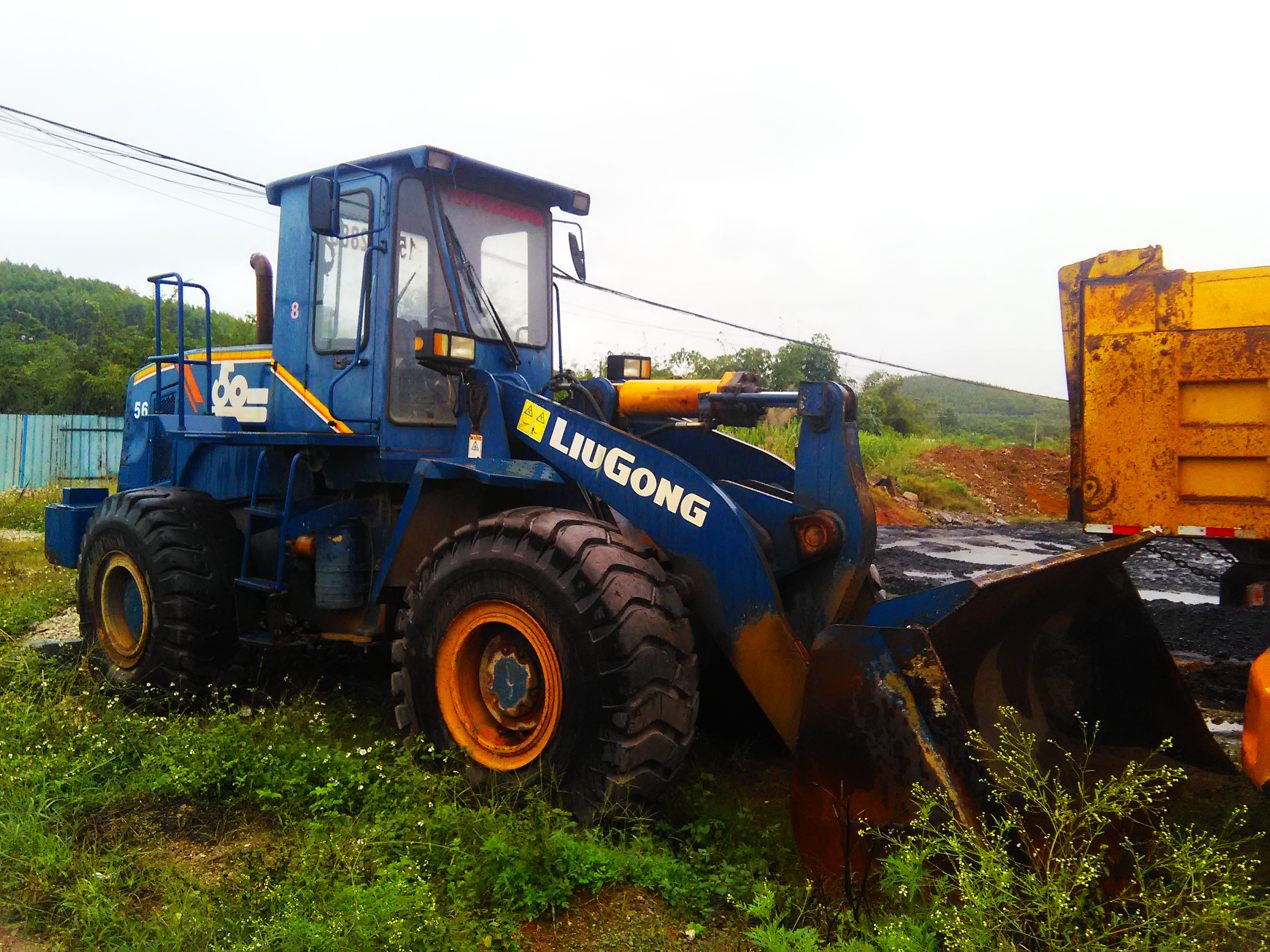
A LiuGong blue wheel loader in Luorong Town, Liuzhou, China.

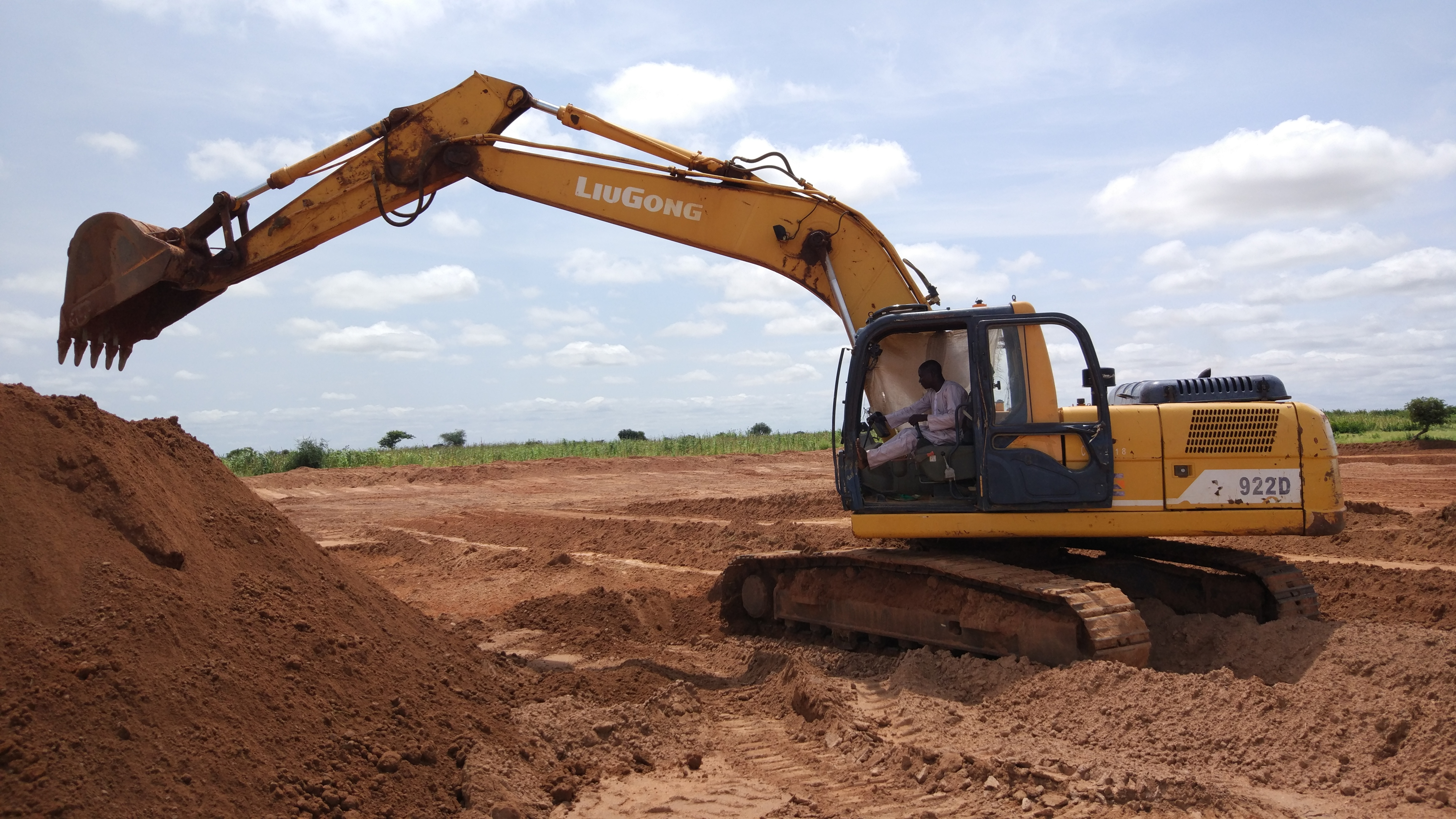
A LiuGong excavator in Nigeria

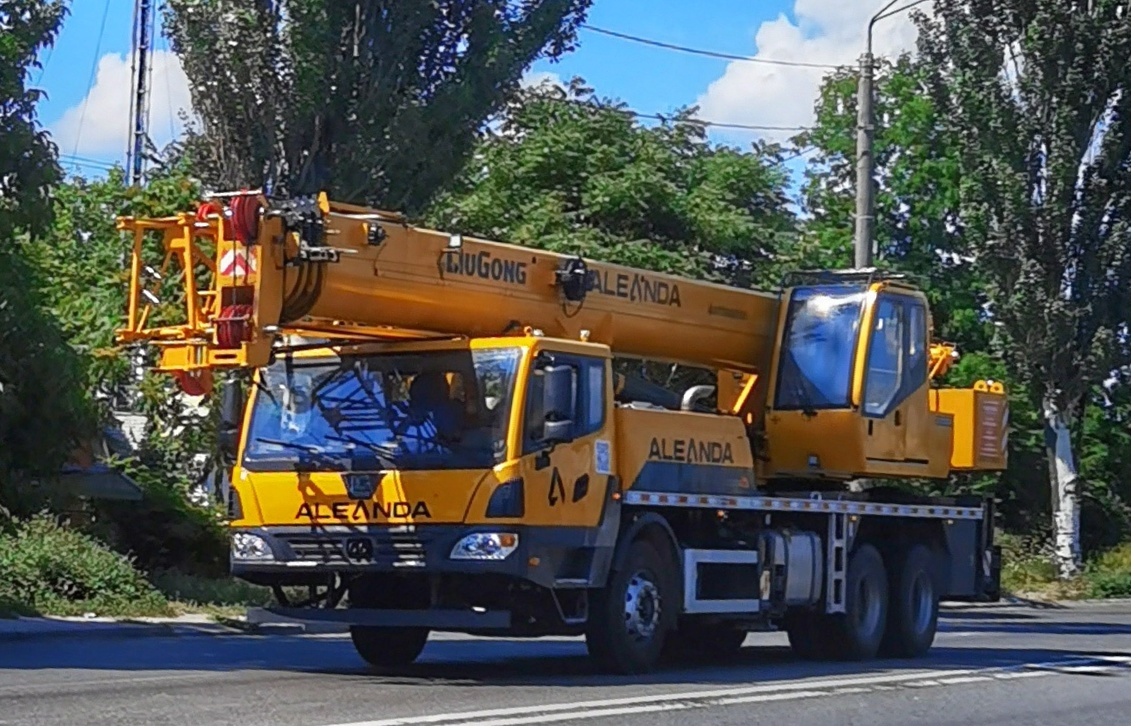
LiuGong crane in Dnipro, Ukraine.

== See also ==
- Caterpillar Inc
- Cummins
