= Kobelco Construction Machinery America =

Japanese-owned American heavy equipment manufacturer

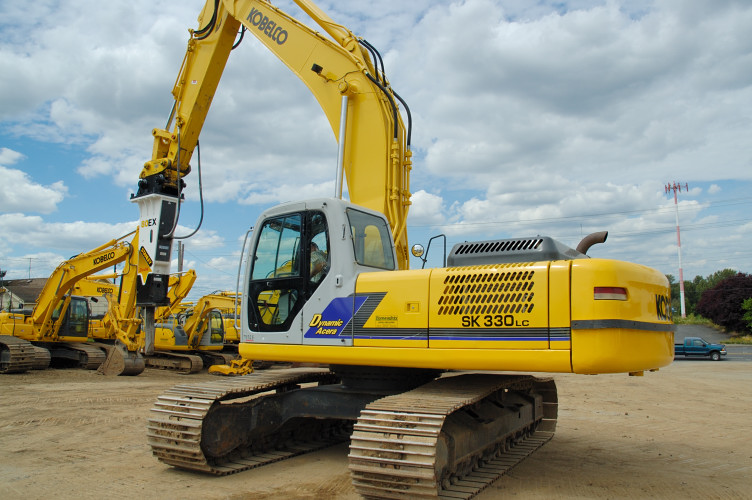
Kobelco SK330LC excavator with a hydraulic hammer attachment.

Kobelco Construction Machinery America, LLC. is a manufacturer of excavators based in Houston, Texas, United States, with a manufacturing plant in Moore, South Carolina and is a subsidiary of Kobe Steel. A former global sales alliance between Kobe Steel and CNH Global ended in December 2012.
