= Huppenkothen Baumaschinen =

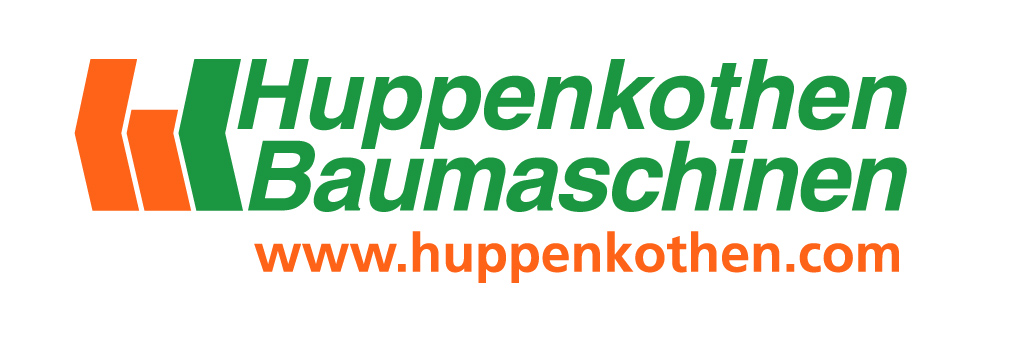
- Company type: GmbH & Co. KG
- Industry: Rentals, sales, heavy equipment
- Founded: 1956
- Headquarters: Lauterach, Bregenz (district), Vorarlberg, Austria
- Number of locations: branches for all Bundesländer and in twelve european countries
- Key people: Franz Wirth (CEO)
- Website: huppenkothen.com

Huppenkothen GmbH & Co KG is a company specializing in compact and mini excavators in Europe. It was founded in 1956 in Bregenz, Austria.

Besides Takeuchi compact and mini excavators, the company also sells and rents out dumpers, skid steer loaders, wheel loaders, single drum rollers and tracked carriers.

== History ==
Huppenkothen was founded in Bregenz (Vorarlberg) in 1956. From 1979 on, the enterprise sold the first mini excavator rotable at 360° “Pel-Job” (Takeuchi TKB1000), which had been invented by the Japanese inventor Akio Takeuchi in 1971. Since then, significant technological progress has been made in the industry of mini and compact excavators. Huppenkothen also grew so that they could expand into Austrian as well as Eastern European and Iberian Peninsula markets.
