= Skid-steer loader =

Compact heavy equipment with differential steering

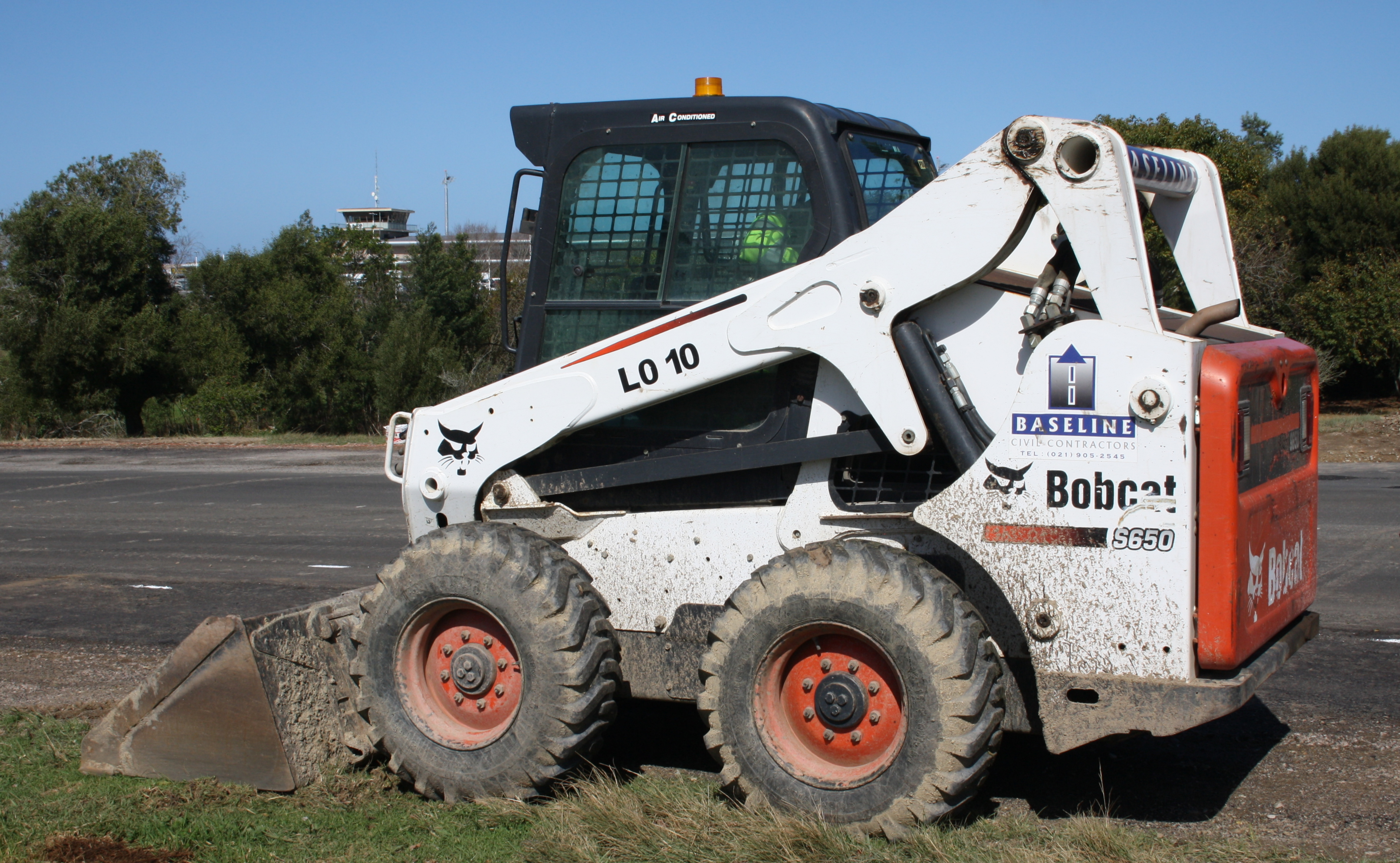
Bobcat S650 skid steer loader

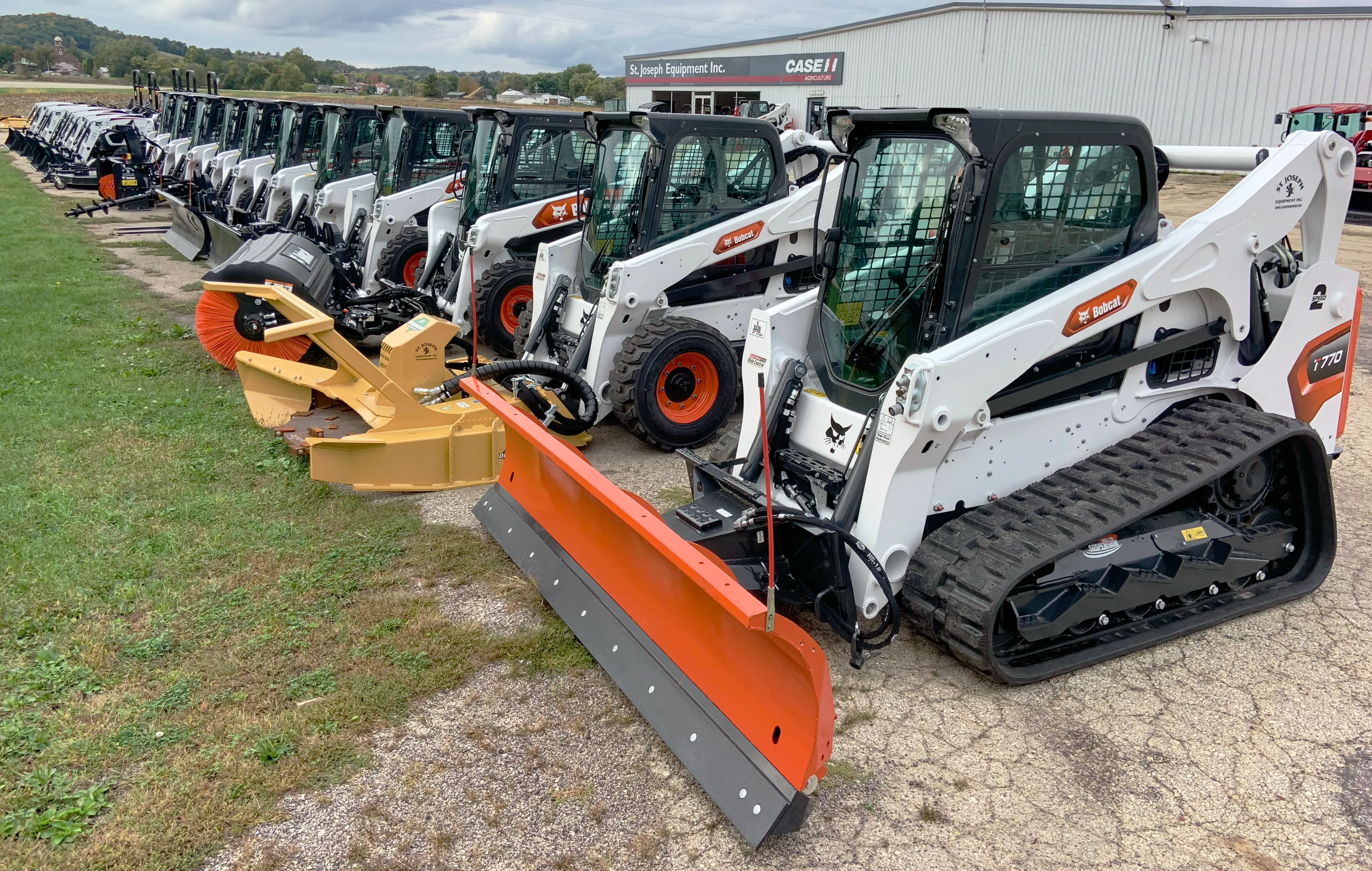
Skid-steer loaders with various attachments

A skid-steer loader (SSL), skid loader, or skidsteer is any of a class of compact heavy equipment with lift arms that can attach to a wide variety of buckets and other labor-saving tools or attachments.

The wheels typically have no separate steering mechanism and hold a fixed straight alignment on the body of the machine. Turning is accomplished by differential steering, in which the left and right wheel pairs are operated at different speeds, and the machine turns by skidding or dragging its fixed-orientation wheels across the ground. Skid-steer loaders are capable of zero-radius turning, by driving one set of wheels forward while simultaneously driving the opposite set of wheels in reverse. This "zero-turn" capability (the machine can turn around within its own length) makes them extremely maneuverable and valuable for applications that require a compact, powerful and agile loader or tool carrier in confined-space work areas.

Like other front loaders, they can push material from one location to another, carry material in the bucket, load material into a truck or trailer and perform a variety of digging and grading operations.

== History ==
The first three-wheeled, front-end loader was invented by brothers Cyril and Louis Keller in Rothsay, Minnesota, in 1957. The Kellers built the loader to help a farmer, Eddie Velo, mechanize the process of cleaning turkey manure from his barn. The light and compact machine, with its rear caster wheel, was able to turn around within its own length while performing the same tasks as a conventional front-end loader, hence its name.

The Melroe brothers, of Melroe Manufacturing Company in Gwinner, North Dakota, purchased the rights to the Keller loader in 1958 and hired the Kellers to continue refining their invention. As a result of this partnership, the M-200 Melroe self-propelled loader was introduced at the end of 1958. It featured two independent front-drive wheels and a rear caster wheel, a 12.9 hp (9.6 kW) engine and a 750-pound (340 kg) lift capacity. Two years later they replaced the caster wheel with a rear axle and introduced the M-400, the first four-wheel, true skid-steer loader. The M-440 was powered by a 15.5 hp (11.6 kW) engine and had an 1,100-pound (500 kg) rated operating capacity. Skid-steer development continued into the mid-1960s with the M600 loader. Melroe adopted the well-known Bobcat trademark in 1962.

By the late 1960s, competing heavy equipment manufacturers were selling machines of this form factor.

Throughout the 1970s and 80s, skid steers began to evolve with more powerful engines, enclosed cabs, and hydraulic systems that supported a broader range of attachments. Manufacturers like John Deere, Case, GEHL and New Holland began producing their own models, each adding unique features such as vertical lift paths or enhanced stability.

By the 1990s, the addition of joystick controls, improved operator visibility, and quick-attach systems made these machines easier and safer to use. As urban job sites grew tighter and more regulated, the demand for nimble, multi-use equipment like skid steers continued to rise.

In the 2000s, innovation accelerated with the introduction of electronic engine controls, advanced telematics, and load-sensing hydraulics. Operators benefited from better fuel efficiency, diagnostics, and fine-tuned control, while rental fleets appreciated the added durability and service tracking. Manufacturers also began focusing on emissions compliance, introducing Tier 3 and Tier 4 engine updates to meet evolving environmental regulations.

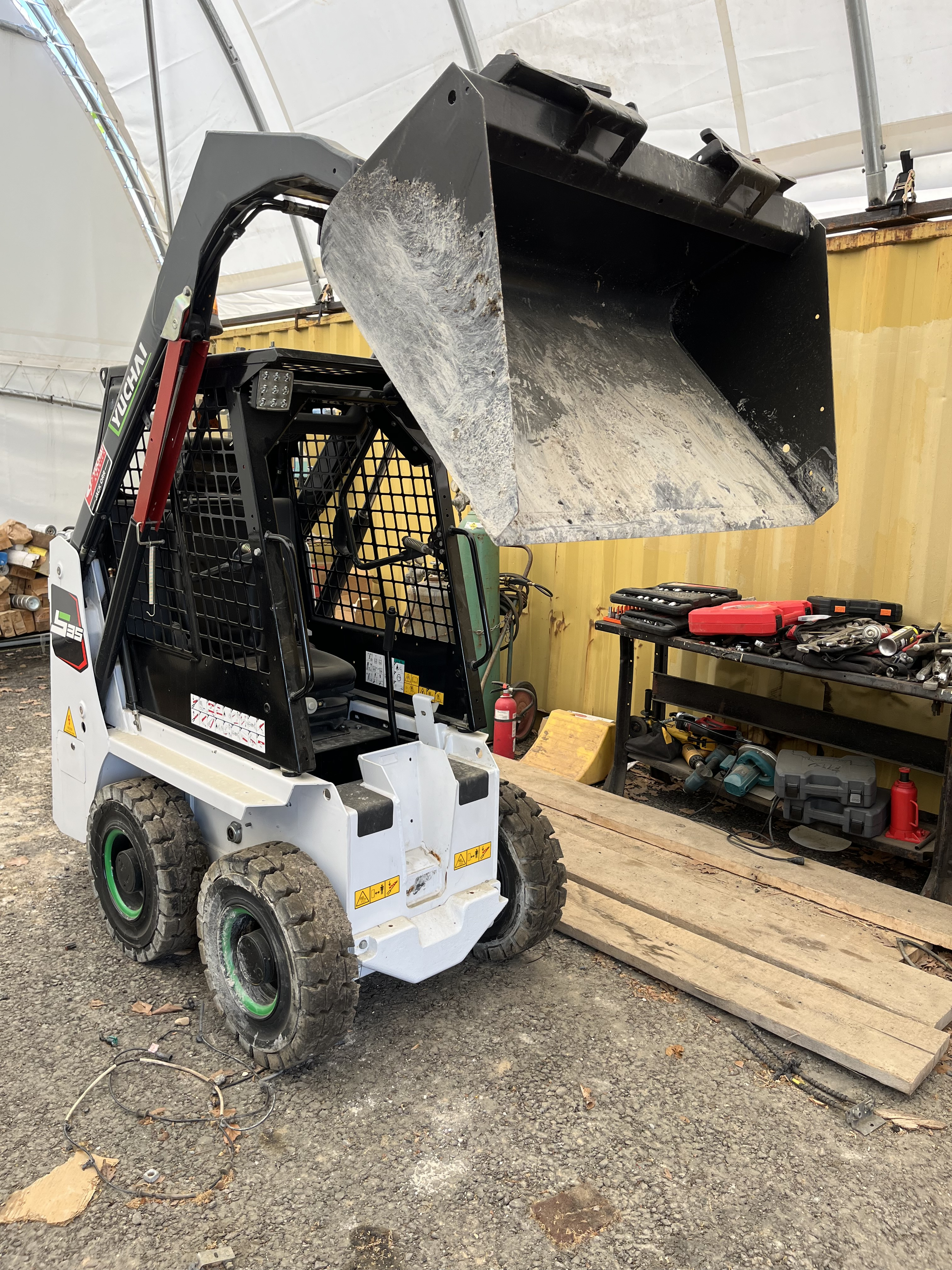
An electric Yuchai S35 skid steer loader at the Zadoon equipment yard in Crofton, Maryland. Electric models like this one offer zero-emission operation and reduced noise, making them suitable for indoor and urban job sites.

More recently, manufacturers have pushed into autonomous and semi-autonomous capabilities, integrating robotic control systems for grading and pathing, as well as remote operation. Simultaneously, electric skid steers have entered the market, offering zero-emissions alternatives for indoor, urban, and noise-sensitive environments.

== Operation ==
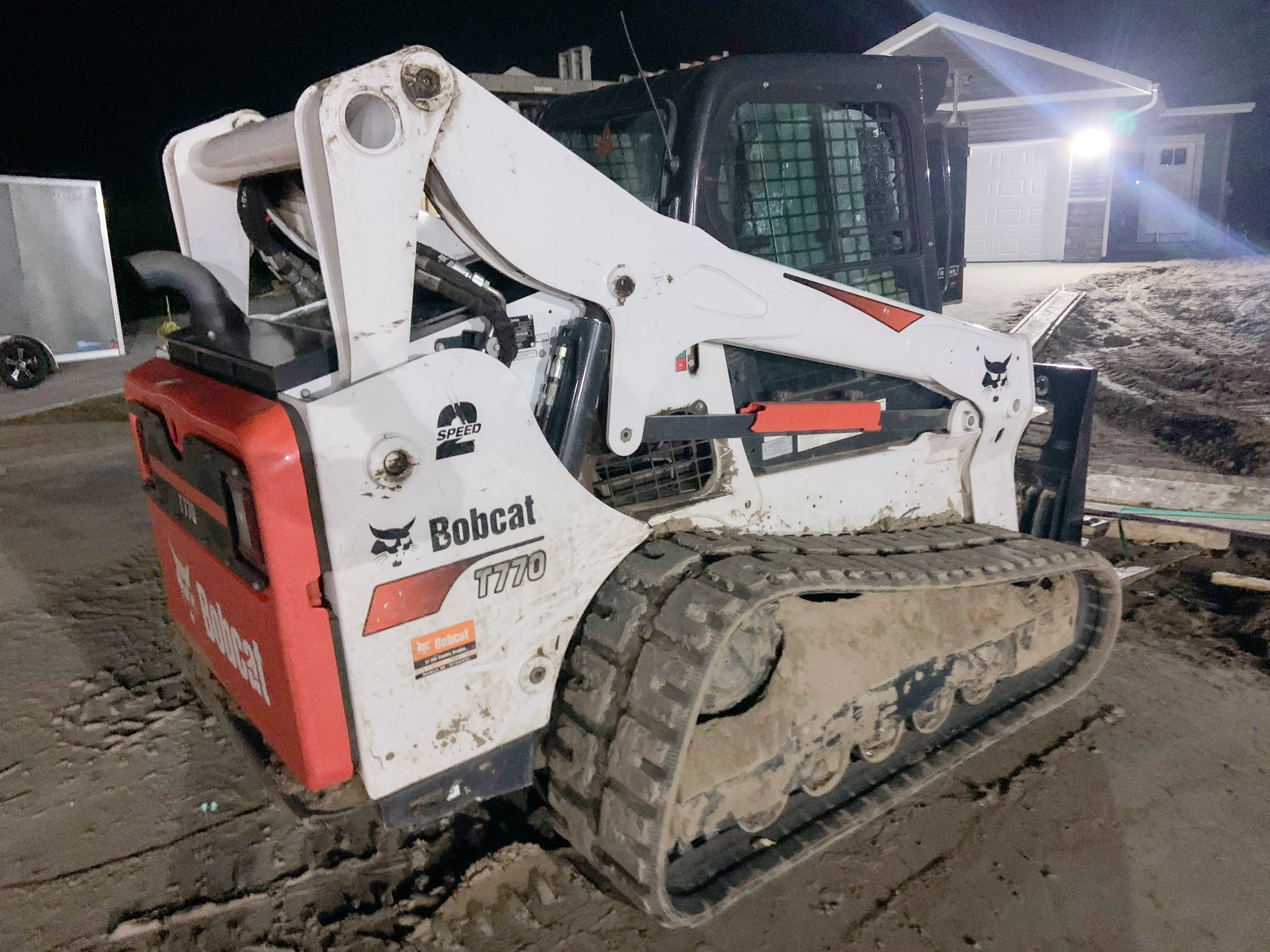
Skid-steer with tracked treads

Skid-steer loaders are typically four-wheeled or tracked vehicles with the front and back wheels on each side mechanically linked together to turn at the same speed, and where the left-side drive wheels can be driven independently of the right-side drive wheels. This is accomplished by having two separate and independent transmissions; one for the left side wheels and one for the right side wheels. Earliest versions of skid steer loaders used forward and reverse clutch drives. Virtually all modern skid steers designed and built since the mid-1970s use two separate hydrostatic transmissions (one for the left side and one for the right side).

The differential steering, zero-turn capabilities and lack of visibility often exacerbated by carrying loads with these machines means that their safe operation requires the operator have a good field of vision, good hand eye coordination, manual dexterity and the ability to remember and perform multiple actions at once. Before allowing anyone, including adults, to operate a skid steer, they should be assessed on their ability to safely operate the machine and trained in its safe operation. In the US, it is illegal for youth under age 18 employed in non-agricultural jobs to operate a skid steer. For youth hired to work in agriculture, it is recommended they be at least 16 years old and have an adult assess their abilities using the Agricultural Youth Work Guidelines before being allowed to operate a skid steer.

Another thing to consider are beacon lights and reverse signal alarms that offer a warning to co-workers about the skid steer’s movements. These alarms are not always standard equipment on all farm or landscape skid steer machines, depending on factors like the age of the machine. Use and continued maintenance of these alarms greatly reduce the risk of incidents involving running over and/or pinning co-workers between the machine and an obstacle. Construction sites and their business contract requirements often call for landscapers to have operational skid steer reverse signal alarms and beacon lights.

The extremely rigid frame and strong wheel bearings prevent the torsional forces caused by this dragging motion from damaging the machine. As with tracked treads, the high ground friction produced by skid steers can rip up soft or fragile road surfaces. They can be converted to low ground friction by using specially designed wheels such as the Mecanum wheel.

Skid-steer loaders are sometimes equipped with tracks instead of the wheels, and such a vehicle is known as a compact track loader.

Skid steer loaders, both wheel and track models, operate most efficiently when they are imbalanced – either the front wheels or the back wheels are more heavily loaded. When equipped with an empty bucket, skid steer loaders are all heavier in the rear and the rear wheels pivot in place while the front wheels slide around. When a bucket is fully loaded, the weight distribution reverses and the front wheels become significantly heavier than the rear wheels. When making a zero-turn while loaded, the front wheels pivot and the rear wheels slide.

Imbalanced operation reduces the amount of power required to turn the machine and minimizes tire wear. Skilled operators always try to keep the machine more heavily loaded on either the front or the rear of the machine. When the weight distribution is 50/50 (or close to it) neither the front set of wheels nor the rear set of wheels wants to pivot or slide and the machine starts to "buck" due to high friction, evenly divided between front and rear axles. Tire wear increases significantly in this condition.

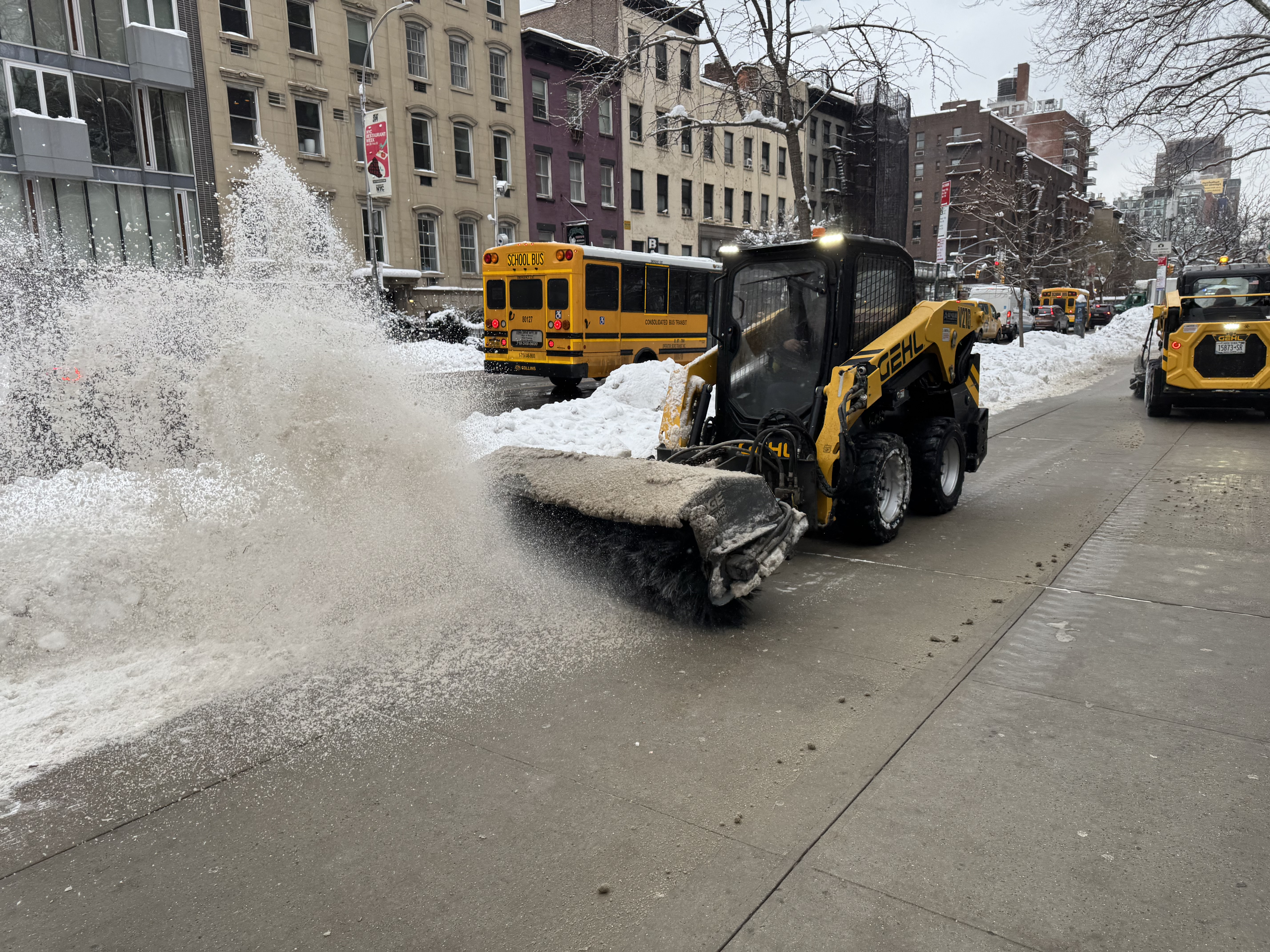
Gehl V210 with enclosed heated cab, side screens and lights for safety.

Unlike in a conventional front loader, the lift arms in these machines are alongside the driver with the pivot points behind the driver's shoulders. Because of the operator's proximity to moving booms, early skid loaders were not as safe as conventional front loaders, particularly due to the lack of a rollover protection structure. Modern skid loaders have cabs, open or fully enclosed which can serve as rollover protective structures (ROPS) and falling object protective structures (FOPS). The ROPS, FOPS, side screens and operator restraints make up the “zone of protection” in a skid steer, and are designed to reduce the possibility of operator injury or death. The FOPS shields the operator's cab from falling debris, and the ROPS shields the operator in the case of an overturn. The side screens prevent the operator from becoming wedged between the lift arms and the skid steer frame as well as from being struck by protrusions (such as limbs). The operator is secured in the operator seat when the seat belt or seat-bar restraint is utilized, keeping them within the zone of protection. Safety features and safe operation are important because skid steer loaders are hazardous when safety practices are not observed. Rollover incidents and being crushed by moving parts are the most common causes of serious injuries and death associated with skid steer loaders.

== Attachments ==
The conventional bucket of many skid loaders can be replaced with a variety of specialized buckets or attachments, many powered by the loader's hydraulic system. The list of attachments available is virtually endless. Some examples include Dura Graders, backhoe, hydraulic breaker, pallet forks, angle broom, sweeper, auger, mower, snow blower, stump grinder, tree spade, trencher, dumping hopper, pavement miller, ripper, tillers, grapple, tilt, roller, snow blade, wheel saw, cement mixer, and wood chipper machine.

Some models of skid steer now also have an automatic attachment changer mechanism. This allows a driver to change between a variety of terrain handling, shaping, and leveling tools without having to leave the machine, by using a hydraulic control mechanism to latch onto the attachments. Traditionally hydraulic supply lines to powered attachments may be routed so that the couplings are located near the cab, and the driver does not need to leave the machine to connect or disconnect those supply lines. Recently, manufacturers have also created automatic hydraulic connection systems that allow changing attachments without having to manually disconnect/connect hydraulic lines.

For snow removal, skid-steer loaders can use several specialized attachments depending on the conditions and type of work. Snow pushers are used to move larger volumes of snow across open areas, while angled blades can direct snow to the side of a travel path. Snow blowers collect and discharge snow away from the work area, and angle brooms are generally suited to light snow and surface cleanup.

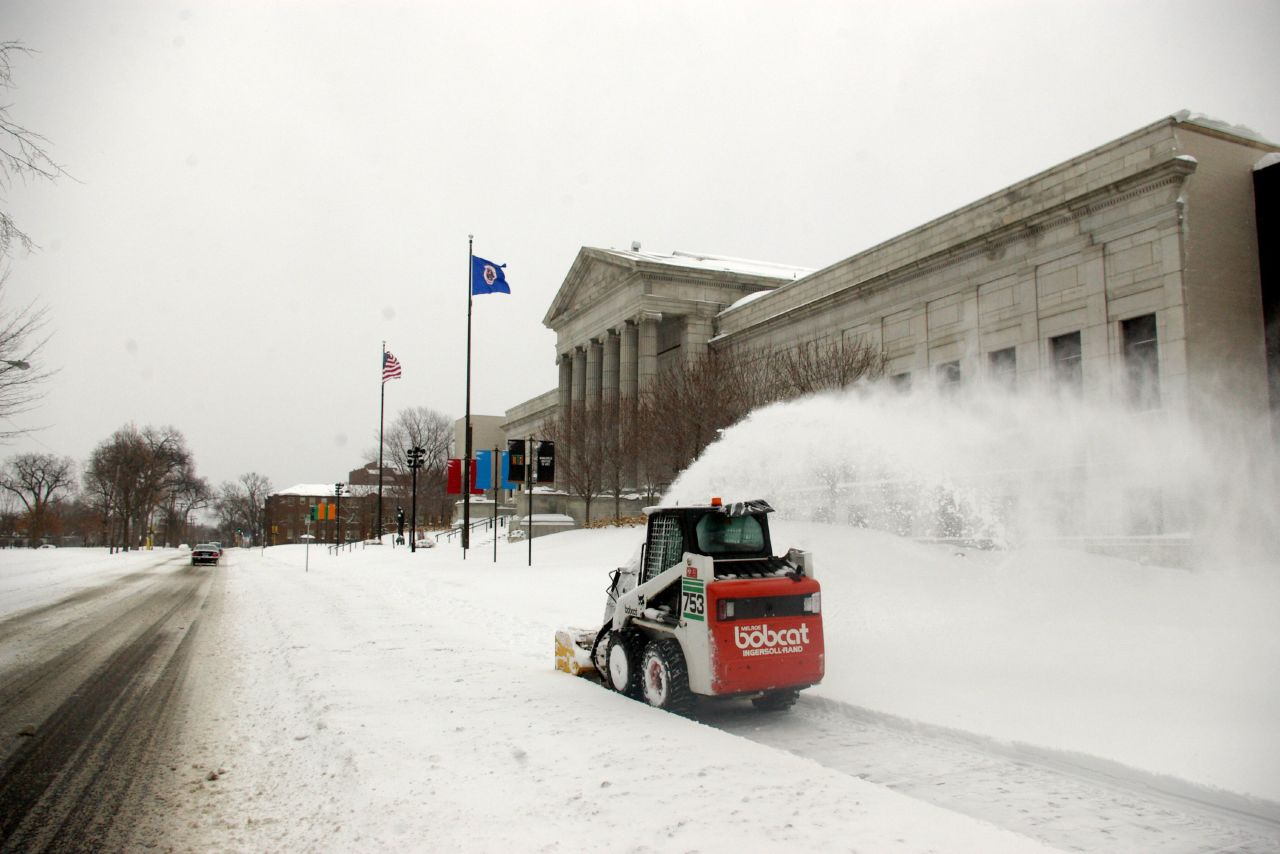
Skid loader clearing snow with snow blower attachment

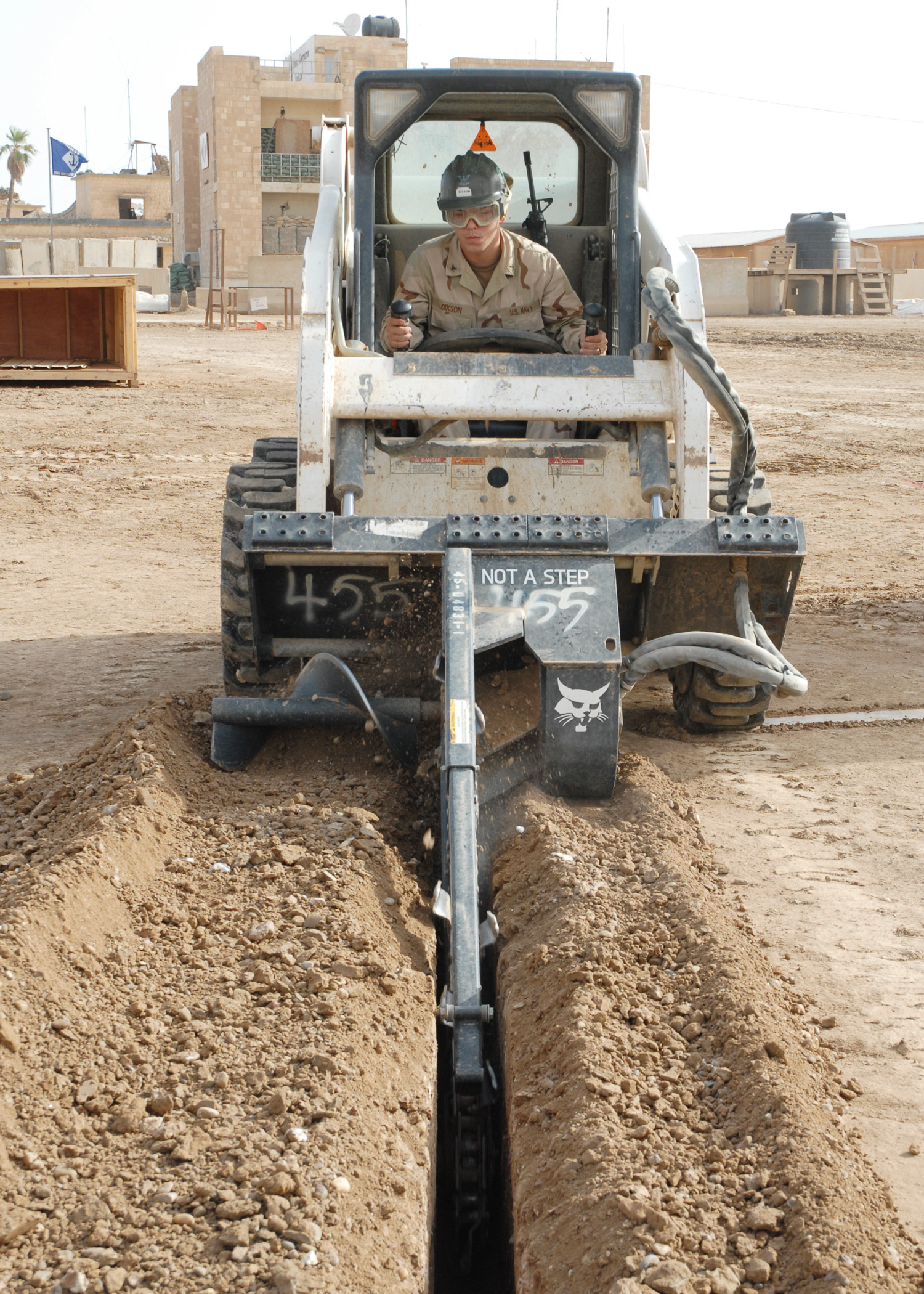
Trencher attachment

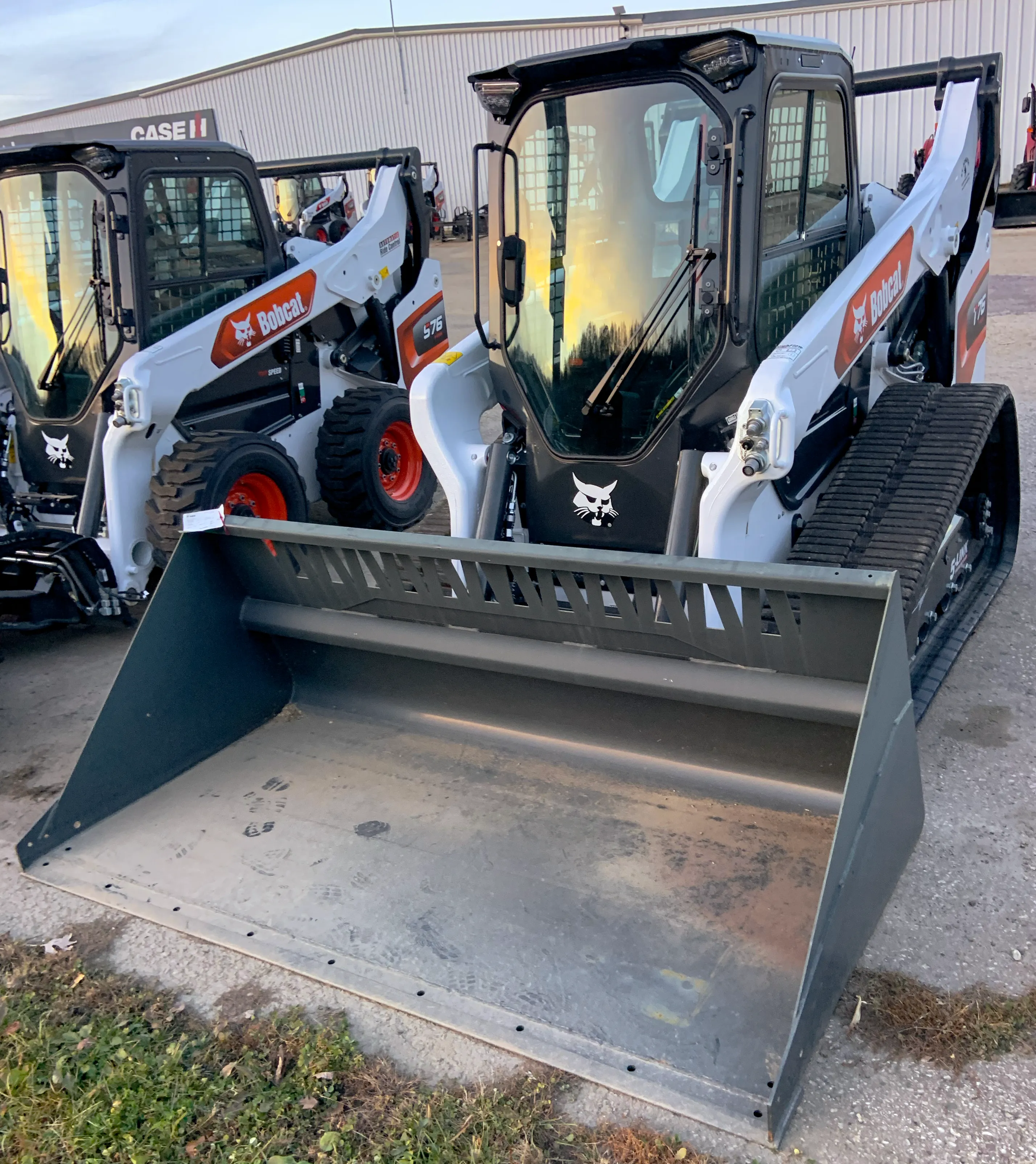
Bucket

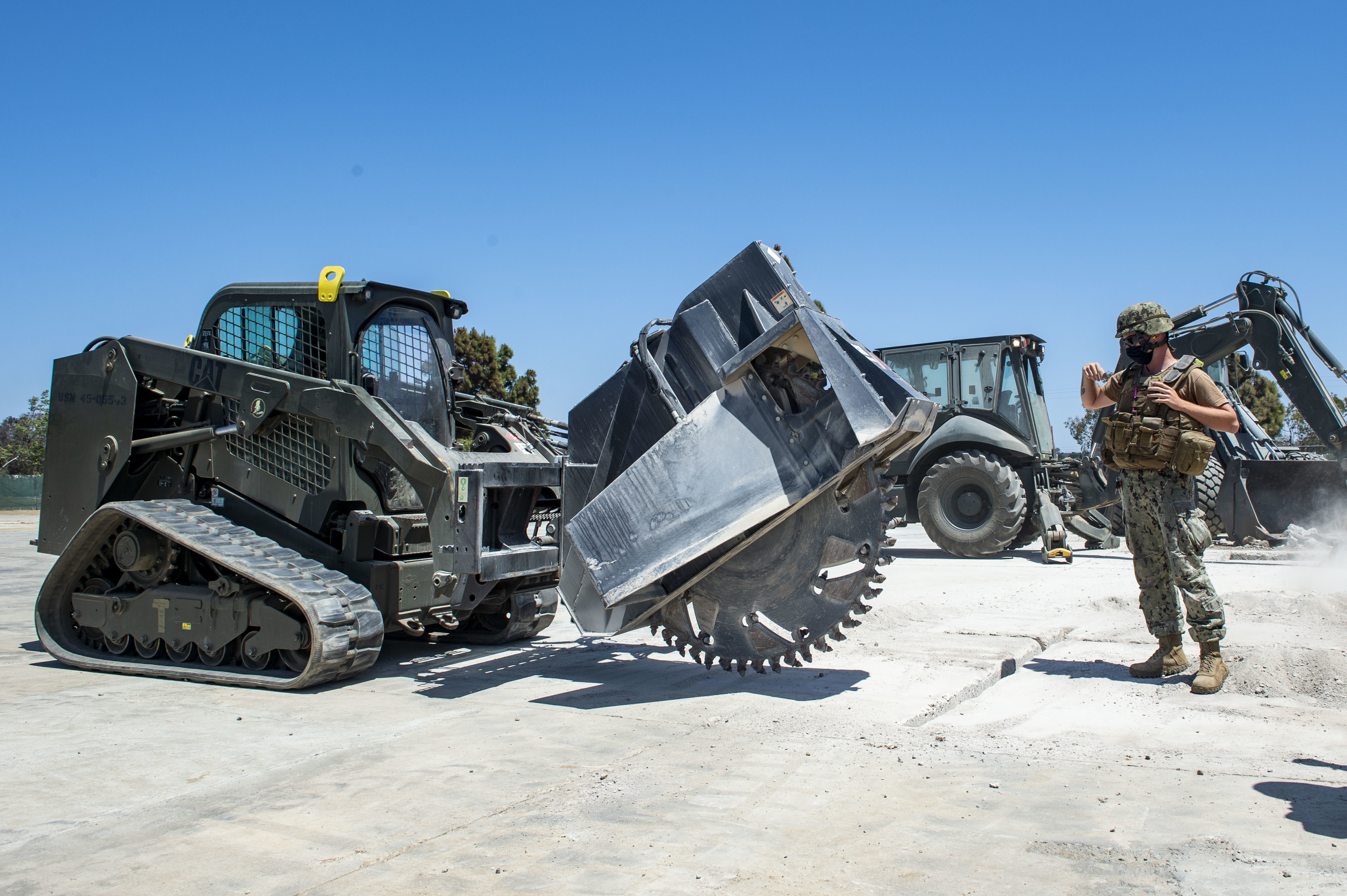
US Navy skid steer with wheel saw attachment

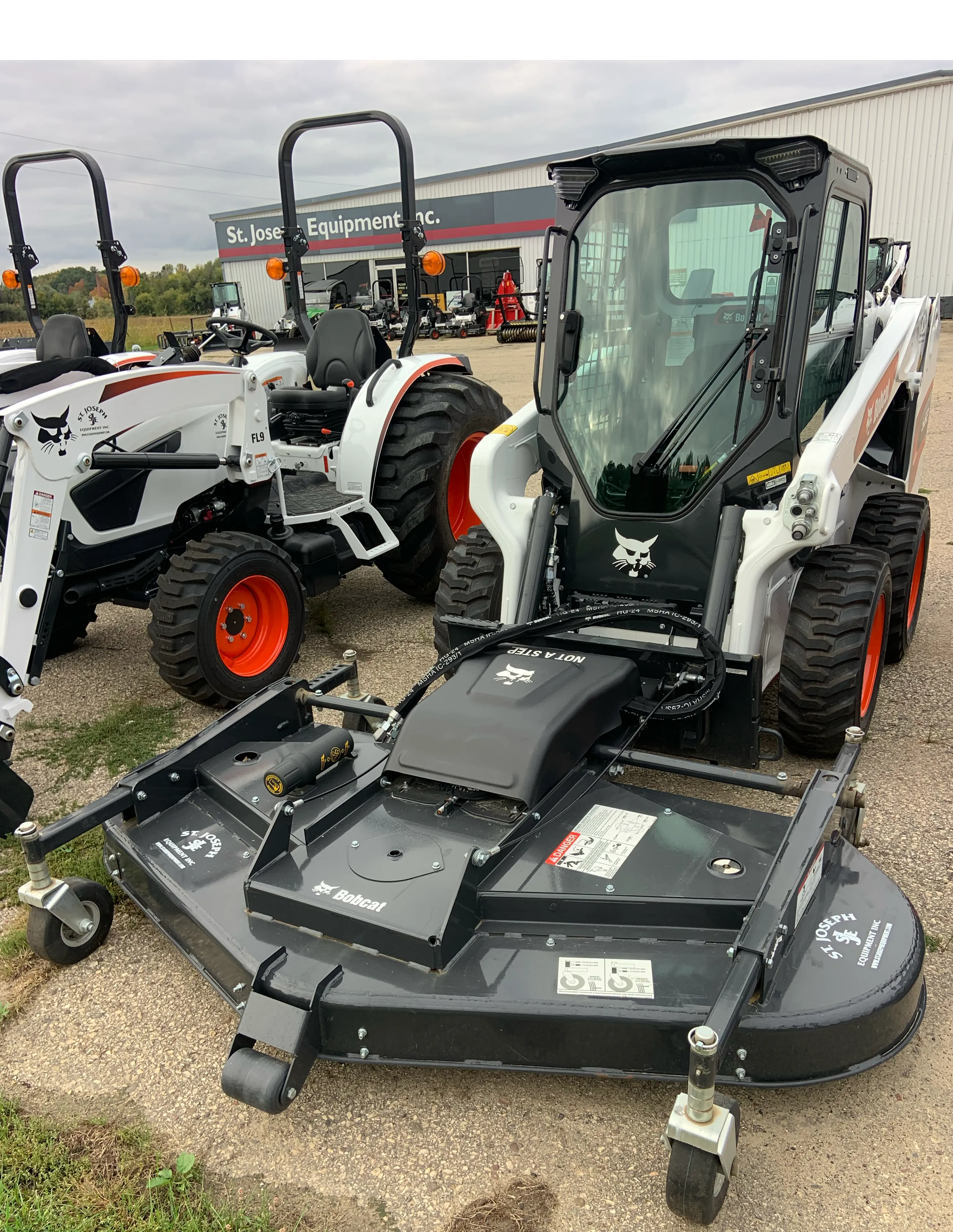
Mower

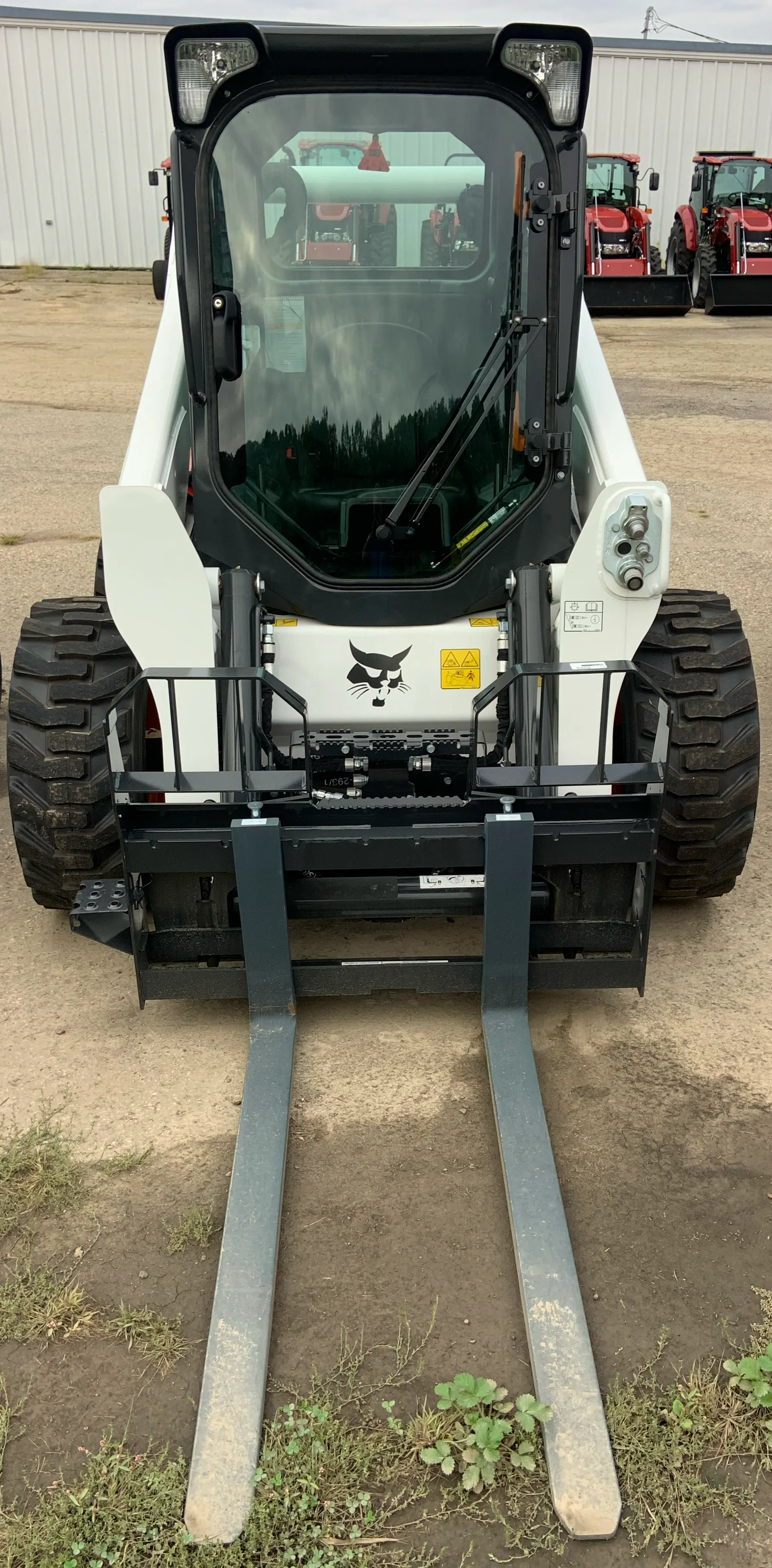
Pallet forks

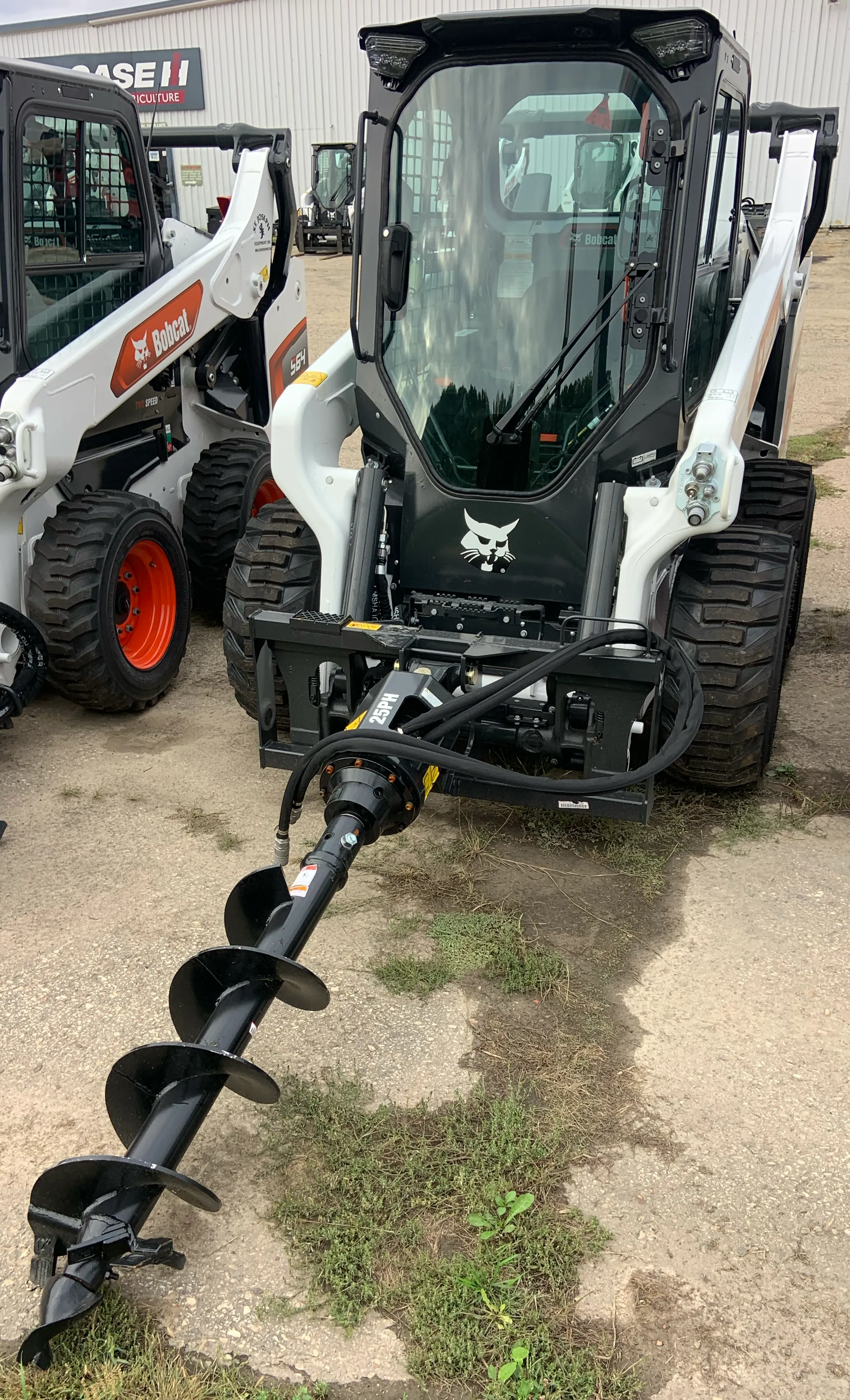
Auger

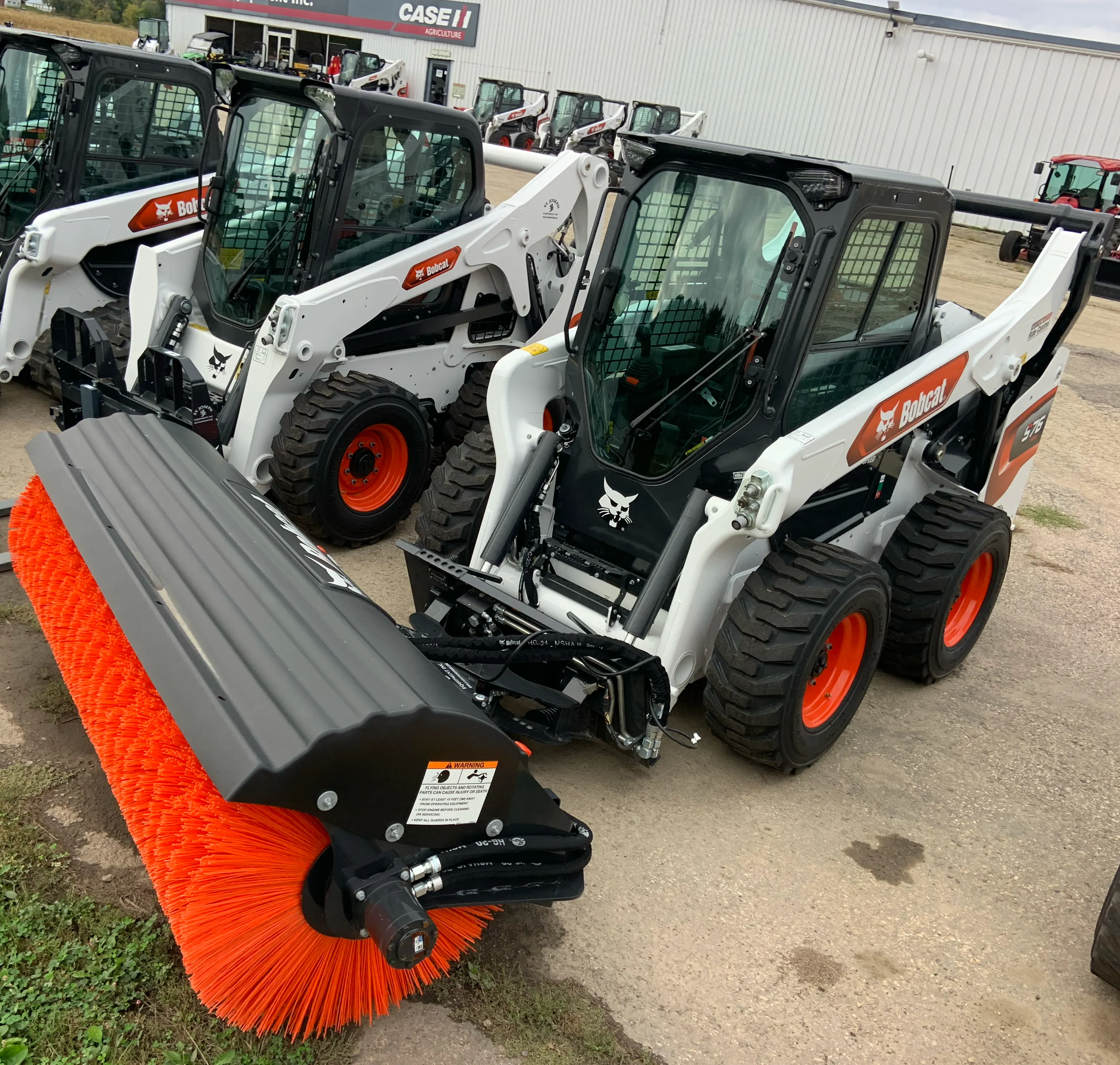
Sweeper

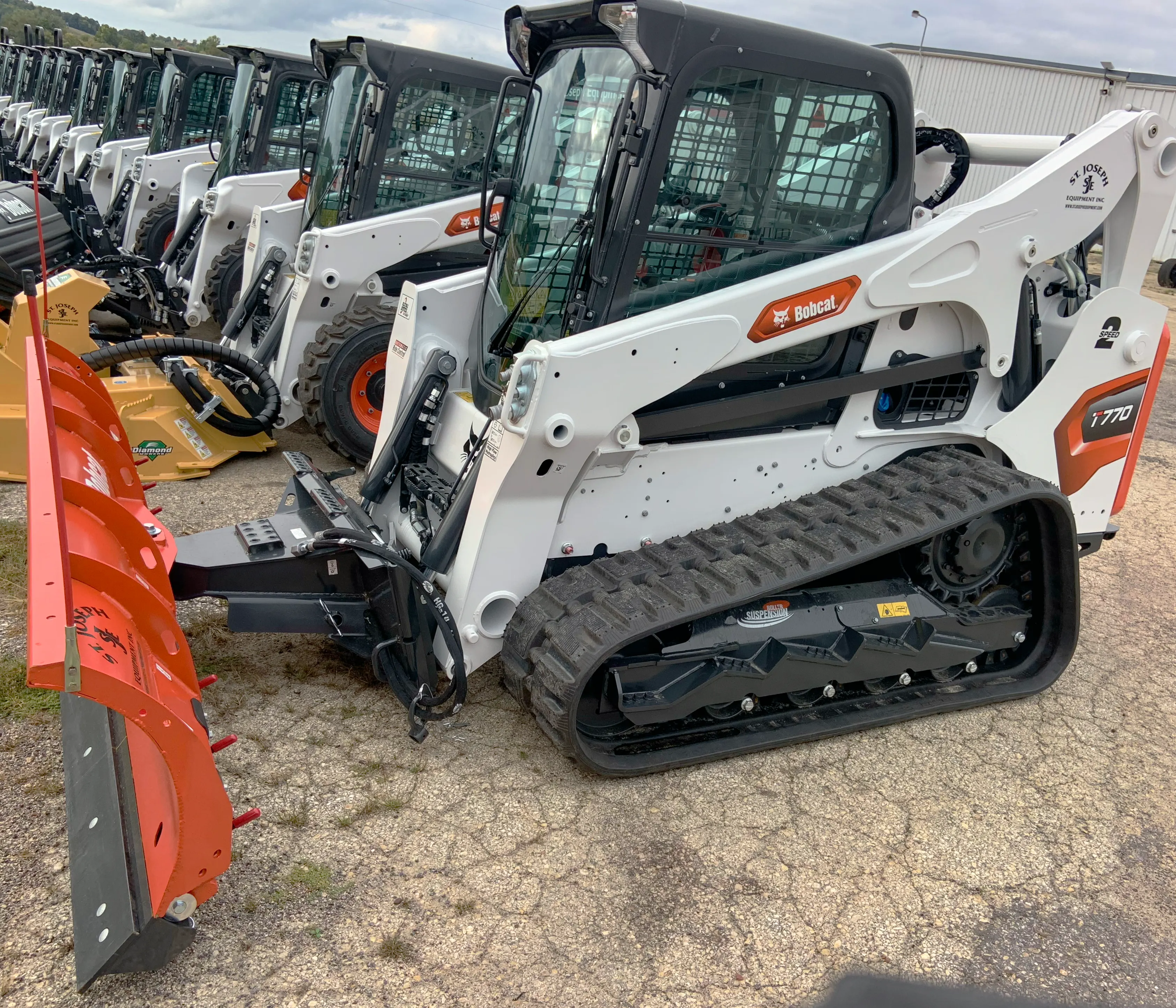
Plow

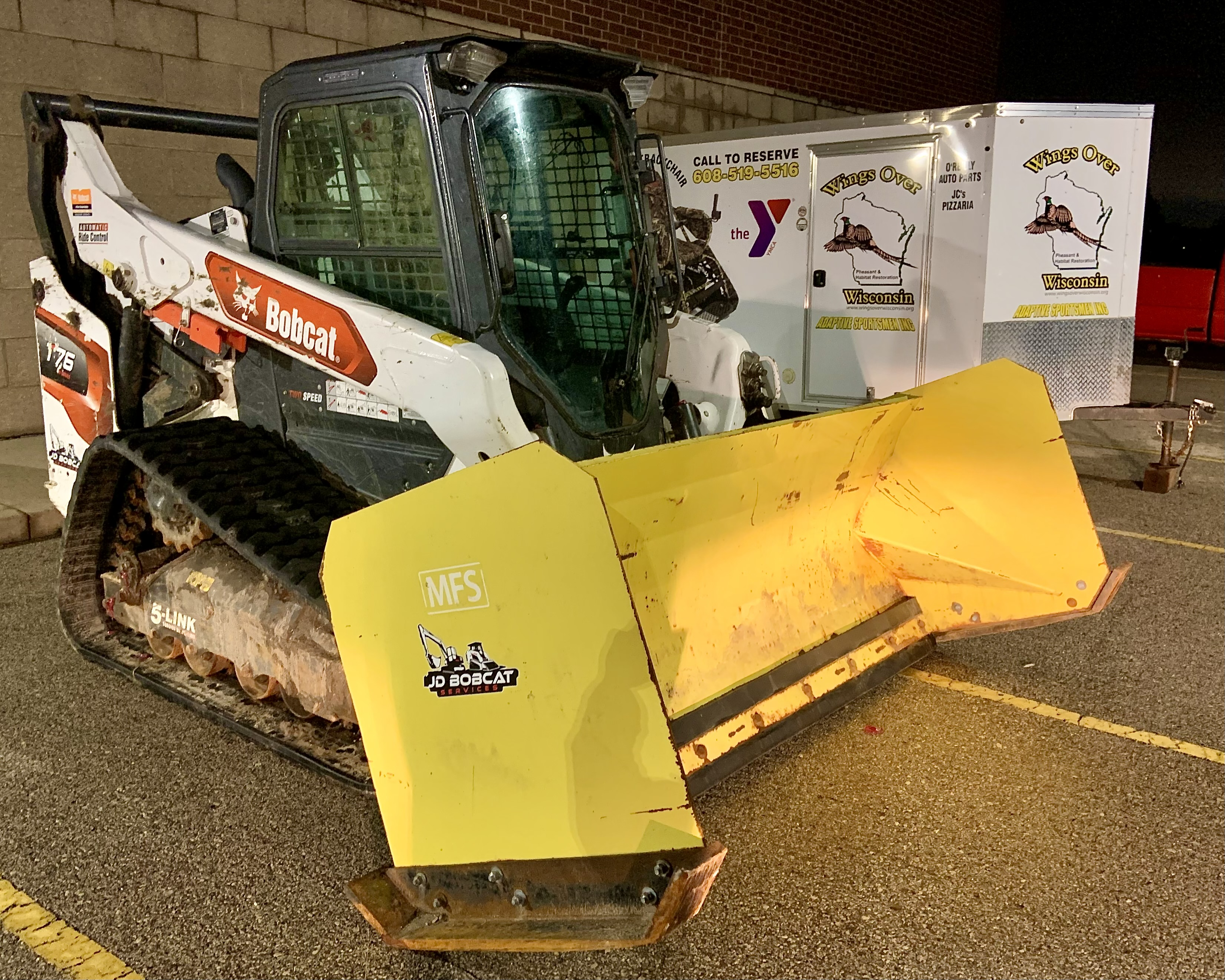
Snow pusher

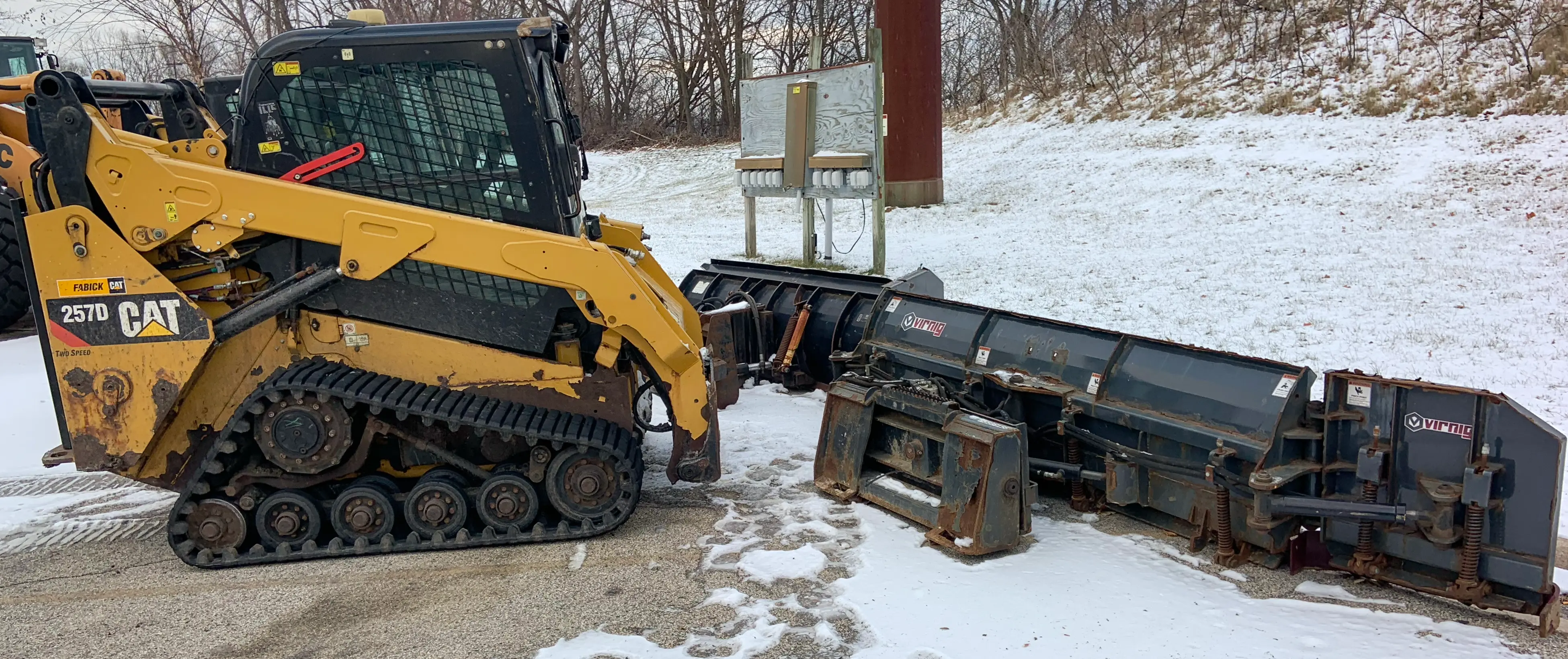
Snow wing has hydraulic wings

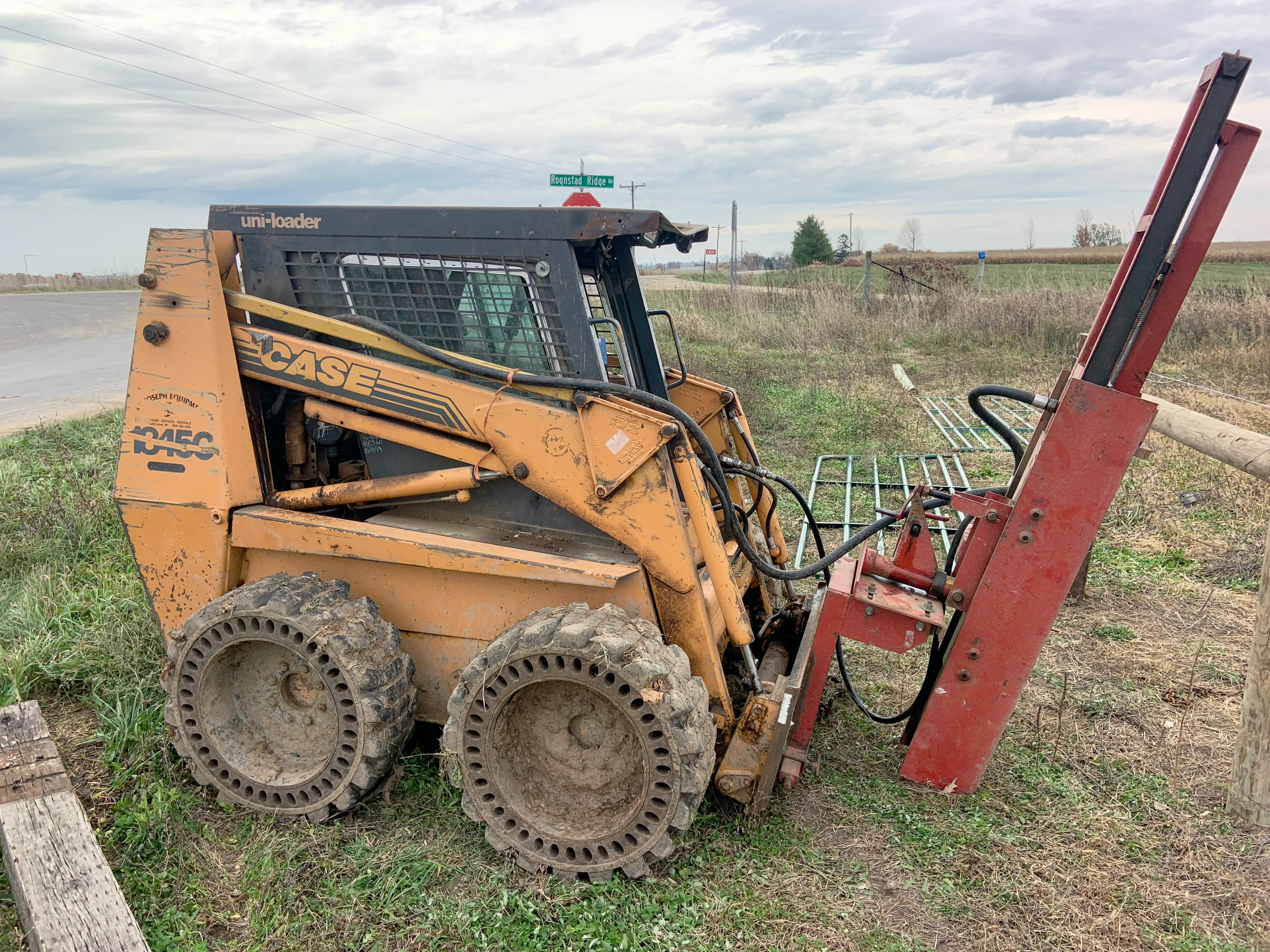
Skid steer post driver

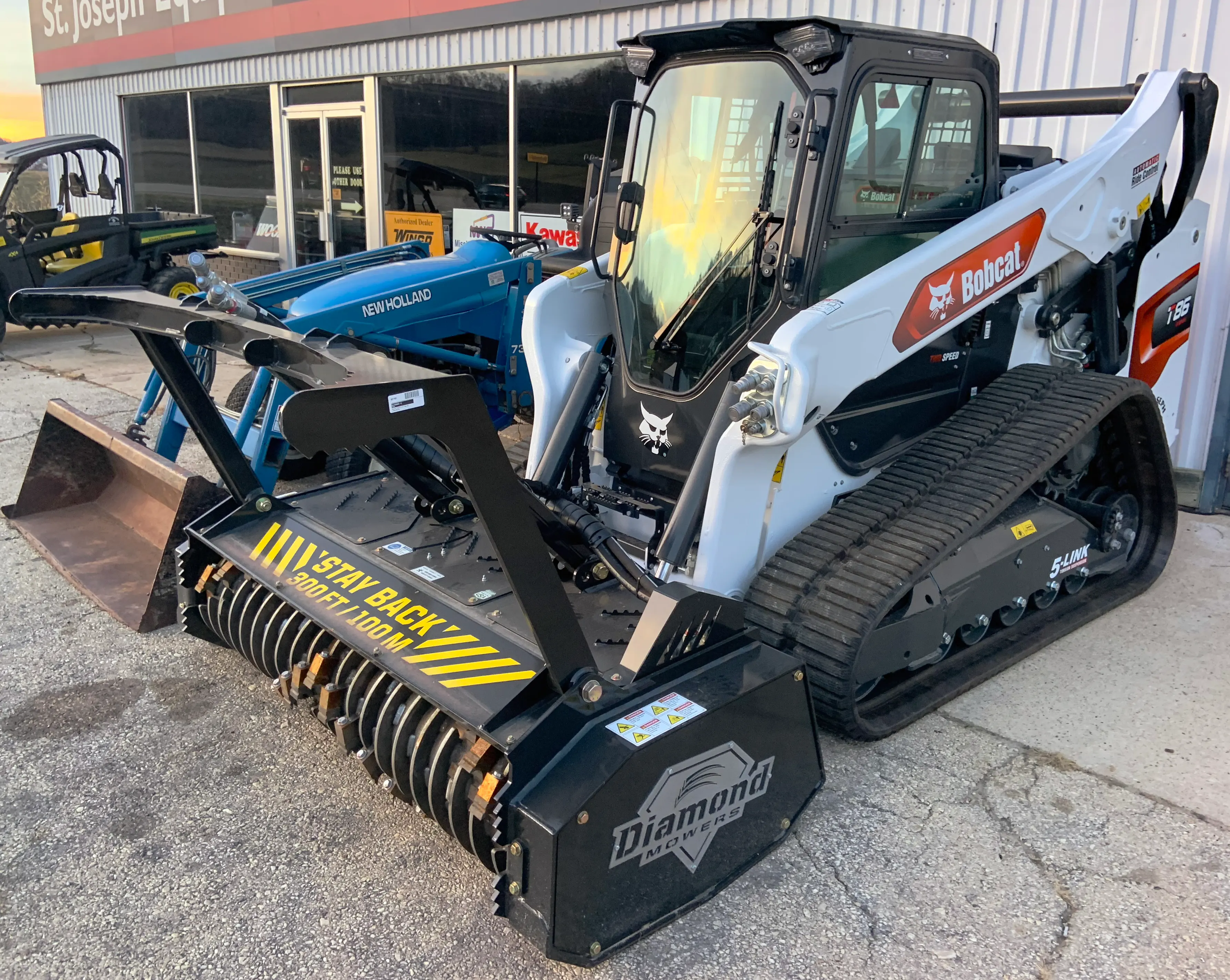
Drum mulcher

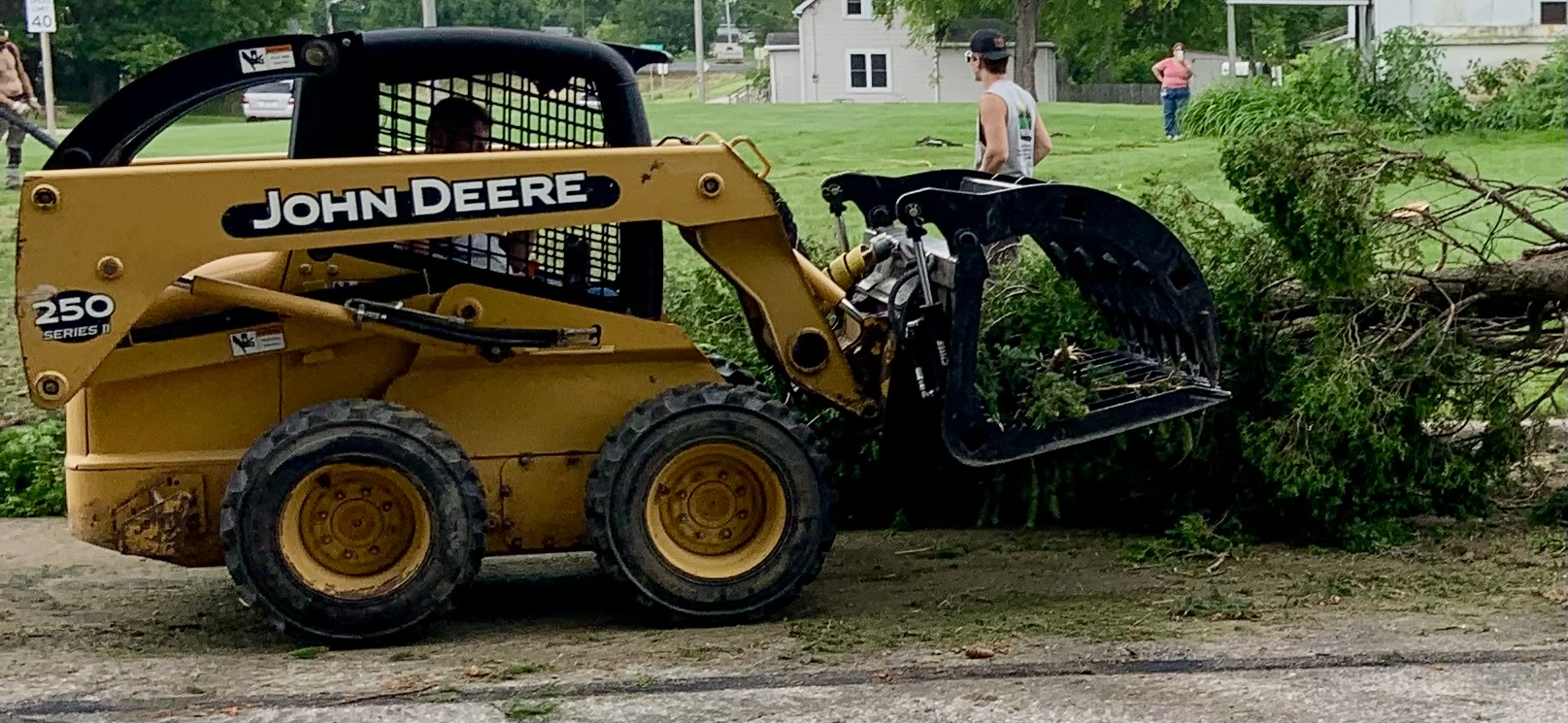
Grapple

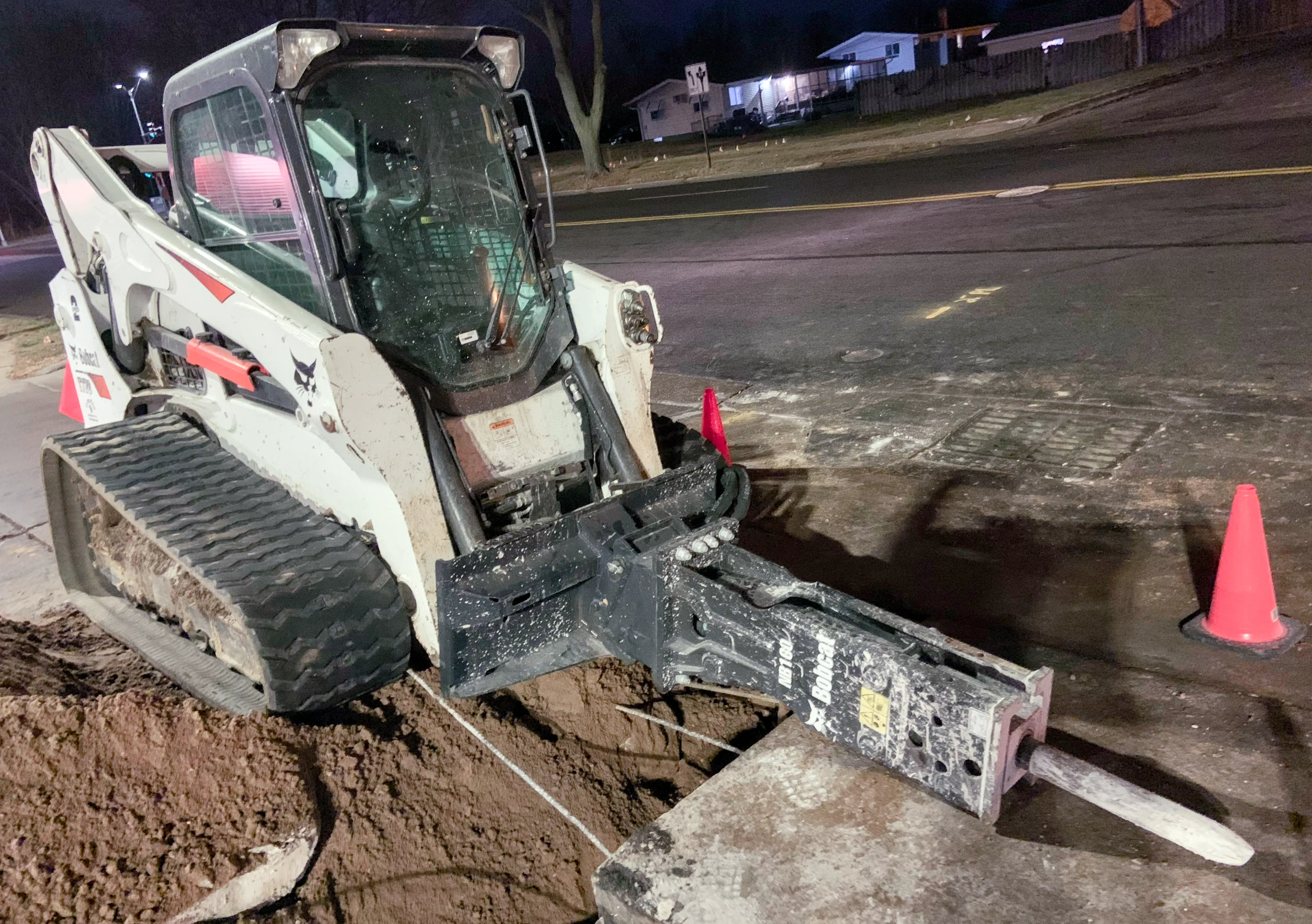
Jackhammer

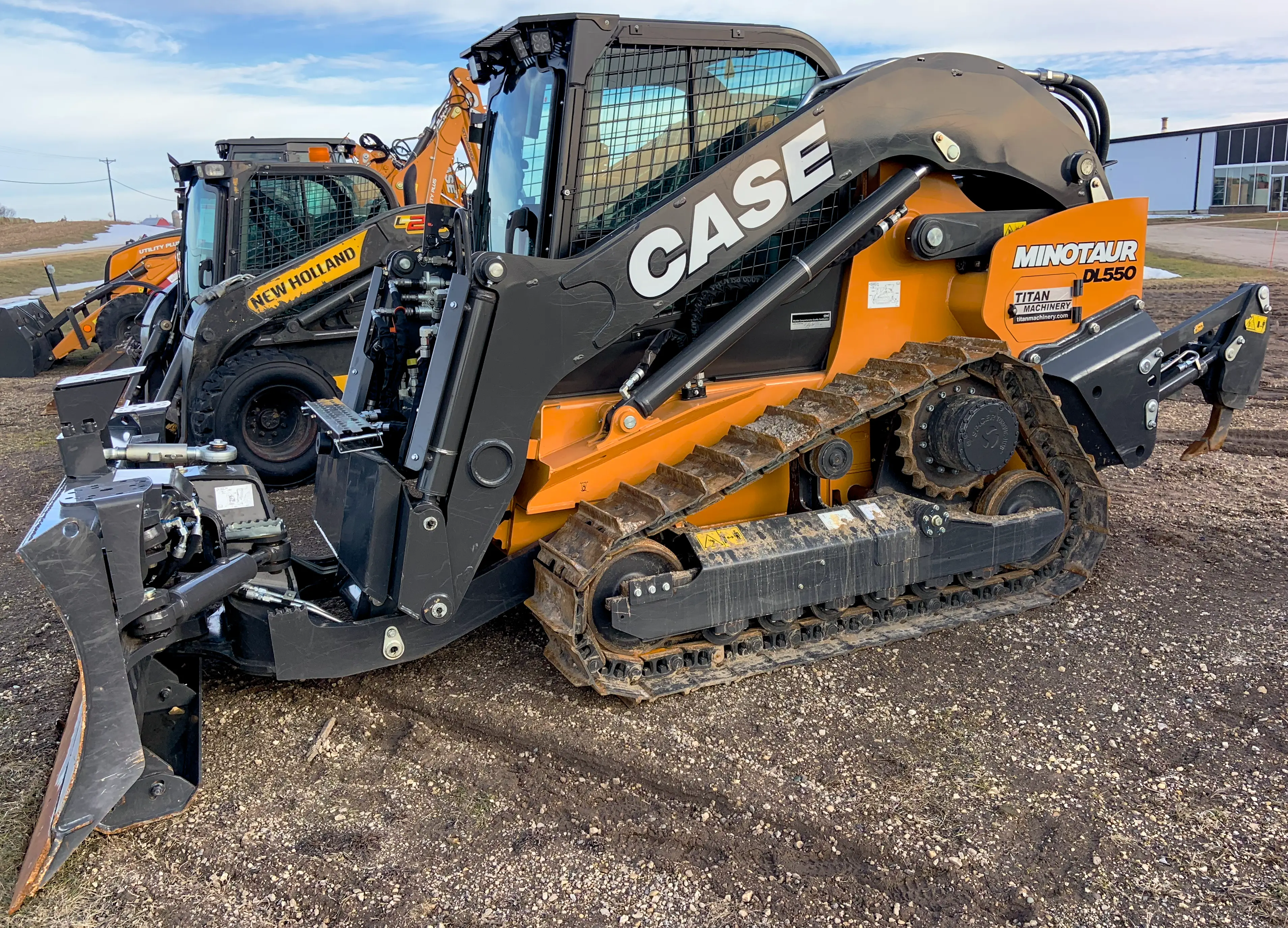
Bulldozer with rippers on the back

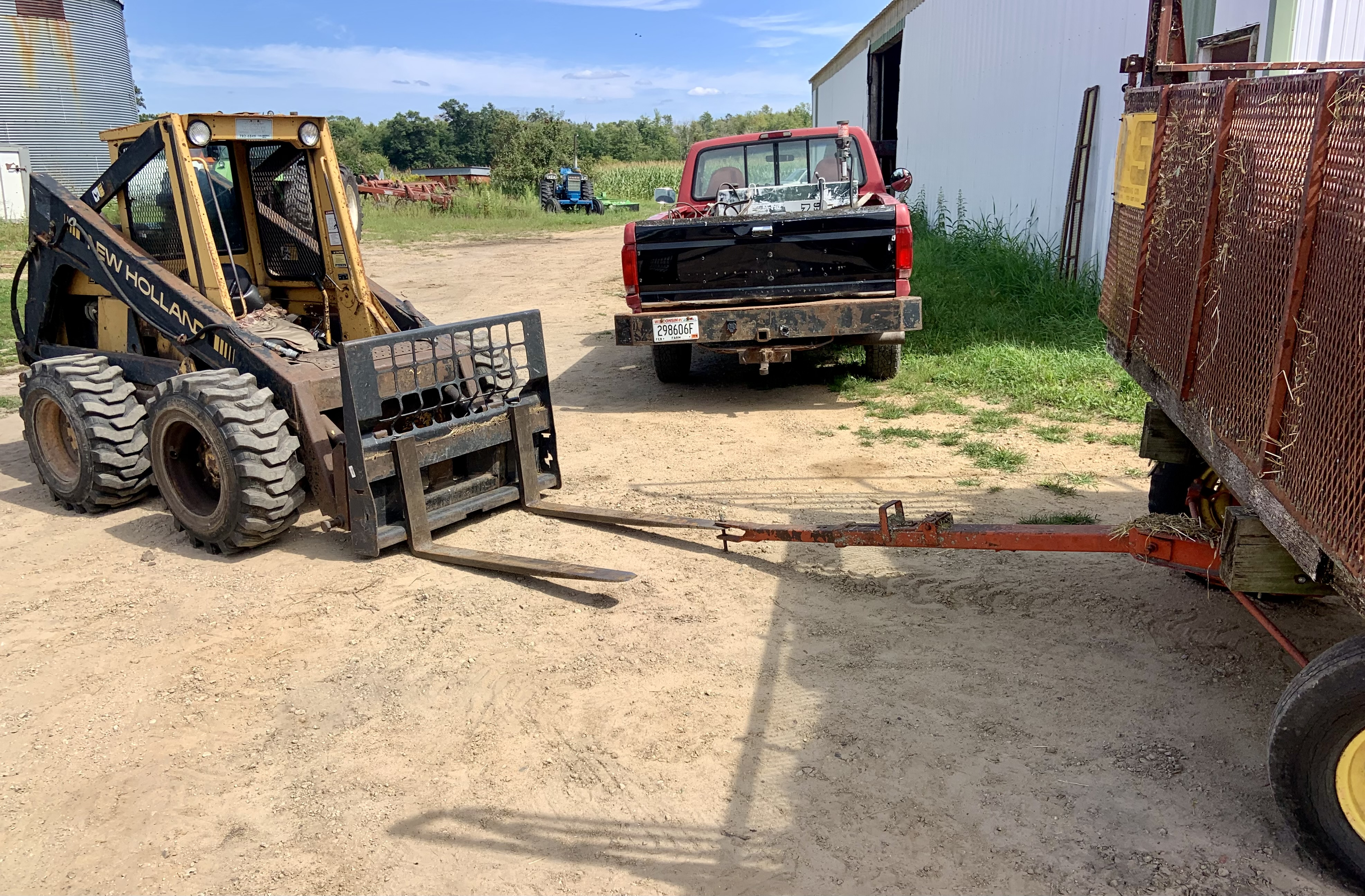
Tow pin hole with hitch pin

== Loader-arm design ==
Lift mechanism of a skid loader of the powered-triad type

=== Radial lift ===
The original skid-steer loader arms were designed using a hinge near the top of the loader frame towers at the rear of the machine. When the loader arms were raised the mechanism would pivot the loader arm up into the air in an arc that would swing up over the top of the operator. This is known as a radial lift loader. This design is simple to manufacture and lower cost. Radial lift loaders start with the bucket close to the machine when the arms are fully down and start moving up and forward away from the machine as the arms are raised. This provides greater forward reach at mid-point in the lift for dumping at around four to five feet, but less stability at the middle of their lift arc (because the bucket is so much further forward). As the loader arms continue to raise past mid-height the bucket begins to move back closer to the machine and becomes more stable at full lift height, but also has far less forward reach at full height.

Radial lift machines are lower cost and tend to be preferred for users who do a lot of work at lower height of lift arms, such as digging and spreading materials at low heights. Radial lift designs have very good lift capacity/stability when the loader arms are all the way down and become less stable (lower lift capacity) as the arms reach mid-point and the bucket is furthest forward. Static stability increases as the arms continue to rise, but raised loads are inherently less stable and safe for all machine types. One downside of radial lift design is that when fully raised the bucket is back closer to the machine, so it has relatively poor reach when trying to load trucks or hoppers or spreaders. In addition, the bucket is almost over the operator's head and spillage over the back of the bucket can end up on top of the machine or in the operator's lap. Another downside of radial lift machines is that the large frame towers to which the loader arms are attached tend to restrict an operator's visibility to the rear and back corners of the machine. The radial arm is still the most common design and preferred by many users, but almost all manufacturers that started with radial lift designs began also producing "vertical lift" designs as well.

=== Vertical lift ===
"Vertical lift" designs use additional links and hinges on the loader arm, with the main pivot points towards the center or front of the machine. This allows the loader arm to have greater operating height and reach while retaining a compact design. There are no truly "vertical lift" designs in production. All loaders use multiple links (that all move in radial arcs) which aim to straighten the lift path of the bucket as it is raised. This allows close to vertical movement at points of the lift range, to keep the bucket forward of the operator's cab, allowing safe dumping into tall containers or vehicles. Some designs have more arc in the lowest part of the lift arc while other designs have more arc near the top of the lift arc.

One downside of vertical lift designs is somewhat higher cost and complexity of manufacturing. Some vertical lift designs may also have reduced rear or side visibility when the arms are down low, but superior visibility as the arms are raised (especially if the design does not require a large rear frame tower). Most Vertical lift machines provide more constant stability as the arms are raised from fully lowered to fully raised position since the bucket (load) has a similar distance from the machine from bottom to top of the lift path. As a side benefit to constant stability, most vertical lift machines have larger bucket capacities and longer, flatter low-profile buckets that can carry more material per cycle and tend to provide smoother excavating and grading than short-lip buckets. Vertical lift designs have grown rapidly in popularity in the past thirty years and now make up a significant proportion of new skid loader sales.

==== Loader arm safety precautions ====
When controls are activated, the loader or lift arm attachments can move and crush individuals who are within the range of the machinery. To prevent injuries, it is strongly advisable for operators to not start or operate controls from outside of the cab. When in the operator’s seat, the operator should always fasten the seatbelt and lower the safety bar to stay securely in the cab and avoid being crushed. Operators should also ensure that any helpers or bystanders are clear of the machine before starting it.

== Applications ==
A skid-steer loader can sometimes be used in place of a large excavator by digging a hole from the inside. This is especially true for digging swimming pools in a back yard where a large excavator cannot fit. The skid loader first digs a ramp leading to the edge of the desired excavation. It then uses the ramp to carry material out of the hole. The skid loader reshapes the ramp making it steeper and longer as the excavation deepens. This method is also useful for digging under a structure where overhead clearance does not allow for the boom of a large excavator, such as digging a basement under an existing house. Several companies make backhoe attachments for skid-steers. These are more effective for digging in a small area than the method above and can work in the same environments.

Other applications may consist of transporting raw material around a job site, either in buckets or using pallet forks. Rough terrain forklifts have very poor maneuverability; and smaller "material handling" forklifts have good maneuverability but poor traction. Skid steer loaders have very good maneuverability and traction but typically lower lift capacity than forklifts.

Skid steer loaders excel at snow removal, especially in smaller parking lots where maneuverability around existing cars, light poles, and curbs is an issue with larger snow plows. Skid steers also have the ability to actually remove the snow rather than just plowing it and pushing snow into a pile.

== Manufacturers ==
- Bobcat
- Case
- Caterpillar
- CNH Industrial N.V.
- Dingo Australia
- Gehl Company
- Hyundai
- JCB
- John Deere
- Komatsu
- KOBELCO Construction Machinery Co. Ltd
- Kubota
- LiuGong
- Manitou Group
- New Holland
- Sany Group Co. Ltd
- Takeuchi
- Toro
- Toyota Industries
- Volvo
- Wacker Neuson
- Yanmar

== See also ==
- Amphibious vehicle
- Backhoe loader
- Bulldozer
- Challenger Tractor
- Compact excavator
- Continuous track
- Crane
- Excavator
- Forestry mulcher
- Forklift
- Grader
- Skid-to-turn
- Telescopic handler
- Tractor
