= Gary Briggs =

Gary Briggs may refer to:

- Gary Briggs (footballer) (born 1959), retired English footballer
- Gary Briggs (musician), lead singer and guitarist of Haven (band) and The Strays
- Gary Briggs, founder of Dingo Australia, compact hydraulic equipment manufacturer
