= Skid-to-turn =

Skid-to-turn is an aeronautical vehicle reference for how such a vehicle may be turned. It applies to vehicles such as aircraft and missiles. In skid-to-turn, the vehicle does not roll to a preferred angle. Instead commands to the control surfaces are mixed to produce the maneuver in the desired direction. This is distinct from the coordinated turn used by aircraft pilots. For instance, a vehicle flying horizontally may be turned in the horizontal plane by the application of rudder controls to place the body at a sideslip angle relative to the airflow. This sideslip flow then produces a force in the horizontal plane to turn the vehicle's velocity vector. The benefit of the skid-to-turn maneuver is that it can be performed much quicker than a coordinated turn. This is useful when trying to correct for small errors. The disadvantage occurs if the vehicle has greater maneuverability in one body plane than another. In that case the turns are less efficient and either consume greater thrust or cause a greater loss of aircraft specific energy than coordinated turns.

== See also ==
- Skid steer
