= Gehl Company =

American manufacturer of compact equipment

- Company type: Subsidiary
- Industry: Heavy equipment
- Founded: 1859
- Headquarters: West Bend, WI, United States
- Key people: William D. Gehl, CEO & Chairman
- Products: Construction & Agriculture Machinery
- Revenue: ▲US$457.6 million (2007)
- Net income: ▲US$24.9 million (2007)
- Number of employees: 500
- Website: www.gehl.com

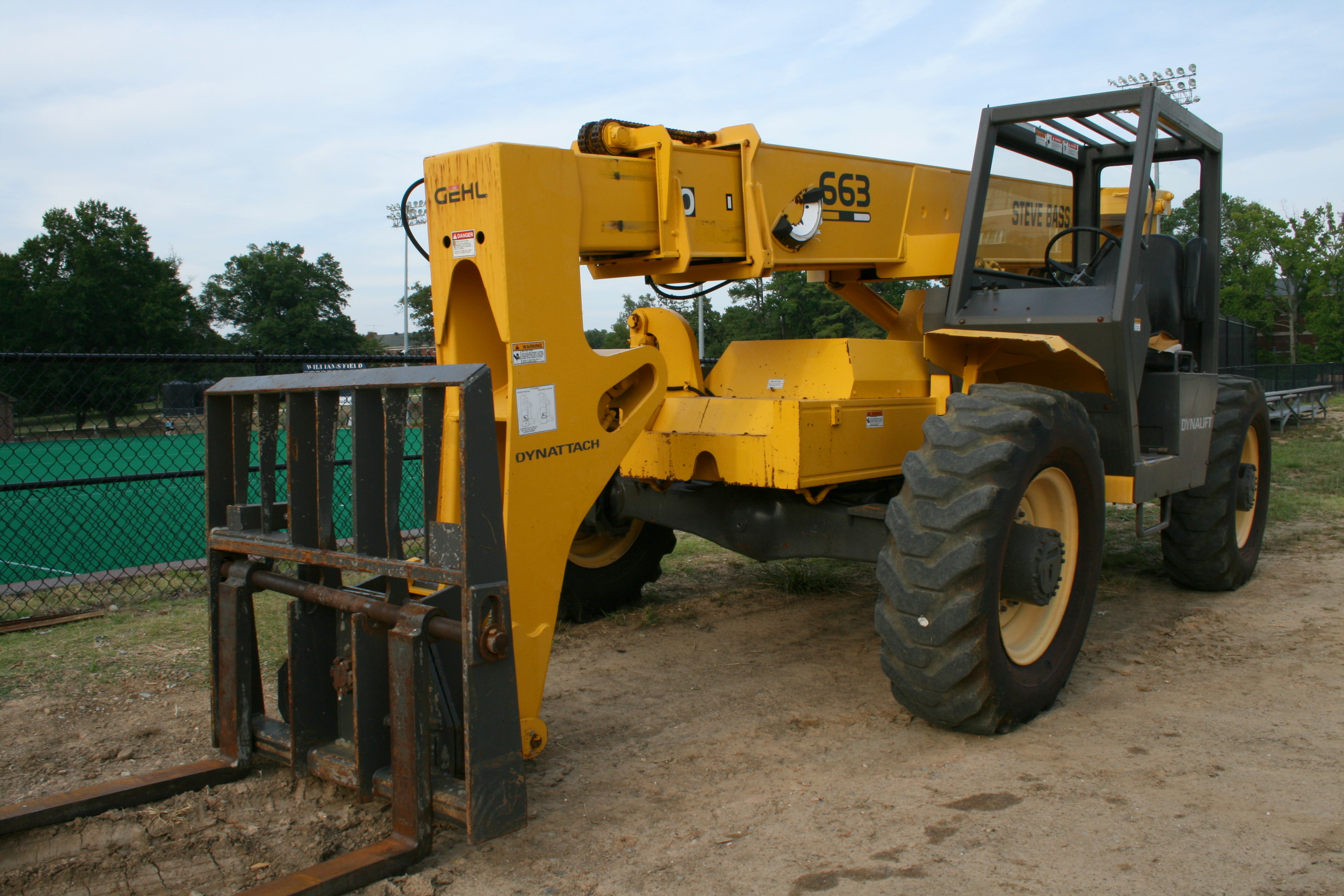
A Gehl telehandler.

Gehl Company is an American manufacturer of compact equipment headquartered in West Bend, Wisconsin. The main campus in West Bend, built on 37 acres (15 ha), includes not only the headquarters but also the research and development facilities for the entire enterprise.

== Product lines ==
The Gehl product lines, including skid steer loaders, track loaders, articulated loaders, asphalt pavers, compact excavators, and telescopic handlers, are used worldwide in construction and agricultural markets. Gehl was North America's largest manufacturer of agricultural machinery other than tractors, until exiting the agriculture business in 2006. The Gehl Company owns the rights to manufacture Mustang skid steer loaders, and previously distributed Takeuchi Compact Track Loaders under the names Gehl and Mustang.

== History ==
Gehl was founded by Louis Lucas in 1859.

Gehl was acquired in September 2008 for US$30 a share by the French equipment maker Manitou Group. This allowed the company to expand its telehandler market into the US and enter several new equipment markets. The company was delisted from NASDAQ under its ticker symbol GEHL.

In 2007, Gehl and the Milwaukee Brewers announced a naming rights deal for a group party club area in Miller Park.
