= Dingo Australia =

Australian manufacturing company

Toro Dingo
- Type: Private
- Industry: Construction machinery
- Founded: Dalby, Queensland, Australia (1992)
- Founder: Gary Briggs
- Headquarters: Australia
- Number of locations: Dalby, Brisbane, Sydney, Melbourne, Perth
- Products: Mini Diggers, Mini Machine Attachments
- Website: www.dingo.com.au

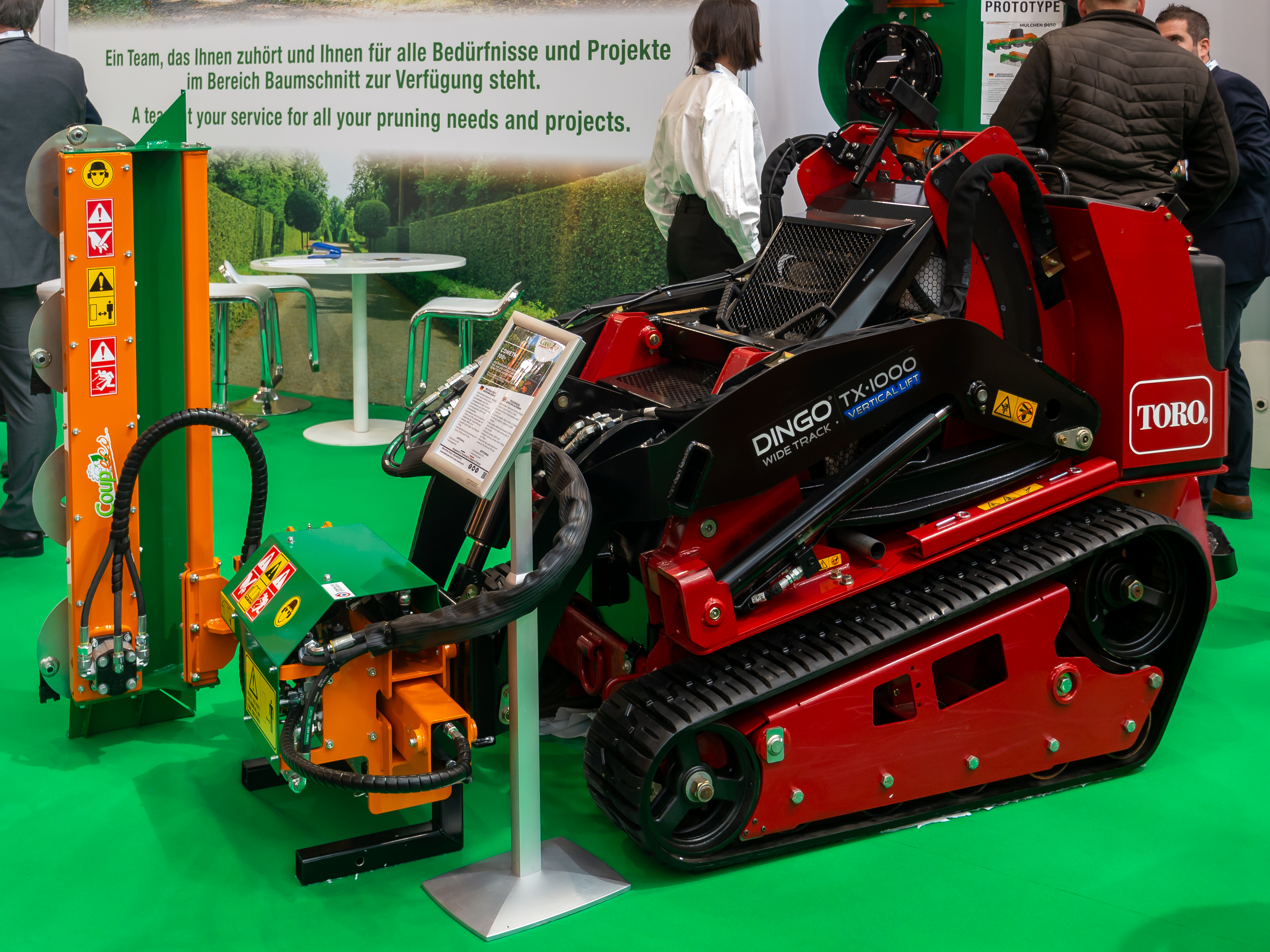
Dingo Wide Track

Dingo Mini Diggers Pty Ltd, is an Australian machine manufacturing company based in Dalby, Queensland. The company manufactures the Dingo Mini Digger which was previously known as the Dingo Mini Loader.

== History ==
The Dingo Mini Digger is a type of mini 'skid-steer loader', an easily maneuvered machine which can typically carry and load dirt, dig trenches, dig post holes and operate a range of attachments. The Dingo has a platform at the back on which the operator stands to operate the machine.

The original Dingo Mini Loader was invented by Ken Whiffin, who was a builder on the Gold Coast of Queensland, Australia. He was assisted by his son, Peter Whiffin, who registered a trading name "Riga'l Universal Loaders" for ownership of the patent associated with the machines. Jaden Engineering were contracted to build the early models. In the 1980s, Riga'L Universal Loaders trademarked the Dingo name for the product.

In early 1900 Gary Briggs an engineer from Australia bought the Riga l Company and took the Dingo from a motorised wheelbarrow to the machine it is today with many great features and a huge range of attachments. He formed Dingo Mini Diggers Pty Ltd.

In 1994, Wendell Williams bought the rights to the Dingo machine for the USA market only and, in 1995, established Williams Inc and started to work to import the manufactured products to America to sell, transforming it with a different engine. Today, the machine is available in several models and with a wide range of attachments.

In 1995, the Dingo product was introduced to the United States by Wendell Williams . In 1997, the manufacturing rights for the North and South American markets were sold to Toro. Toro continues to use the Dingo name for their "Compact Utility Loader" and small earthmover.

In 2007, White Industries, a local business in Dalby, acquired a 33.33% stake in Dingo Australia. After the 2008 financial crisis, Dingo Australia experienced a substantial sales decline. White Industries had the opportunity to purchase a 92% controlling stake for $35,000 but decided to sell their shares back to Dingo Mini Diggers,

== Models ==
Dingo 600 (1992)

- Historical / service parts to be added

Dingo 950 (1995)

- Historical / service parts to be added

K9-3 (2002)

Service parts

- Replacement battery: Bosch 40B19LS. Bosch part number 0092S37010 - (S stands for 'SAE' standard size terminal) - 226mm (h) including terminal x 127mm (l) x 226mm (w). The Dingo battery tray is specifically designed for the following size: ~200mm (h) x ~180mm (l) x ~125mm (w) at the base of the battery. Other Australian battery manufacturers such as SuperCharge (SMFNS40ZALX) and Century (NS40ZLS MF) will no longer fit the Dingo K9-3, as the length of these cells are now 196 mm in length as of ~ 2013.
- Hydraulic filter: 330–004–020
- Hydraulic oil: Valvoline ISO HVI168 - Specifically need this HV (High Viscosity) variant.
- Engine service parts such as oil filter, fuel filter, air filter and spark plugs are best determined using the engine number. The standard engine for this model is a Kohler unit, however these engines have been known to be replaced by users with Honda or Briggs and Stratton units with similar displacements, so it's best to cross check the correct part numbers using the engine number / removing the parts and matching at your local Dingo parts distributor / small engine specialist.

K9-4 (2002 ~ 2016)

- Historical / service parts to be added
  - K9-D K9 Diesel: Two models one Fully Tracked and one Wheeled
- Historical / service parts to be added
  - K9-C K9 Contractor: Two models one Fully Tracked and one Wheeled

== Awards ==
2005 Queensland Training Awards: Mining Industry Skills Centre Medium Employer of the Year & Resources and Infrastructure Industry Skills Council Award

== See also ==
- Kanga Loaders
