= Compact excavator =

Small construction excavator

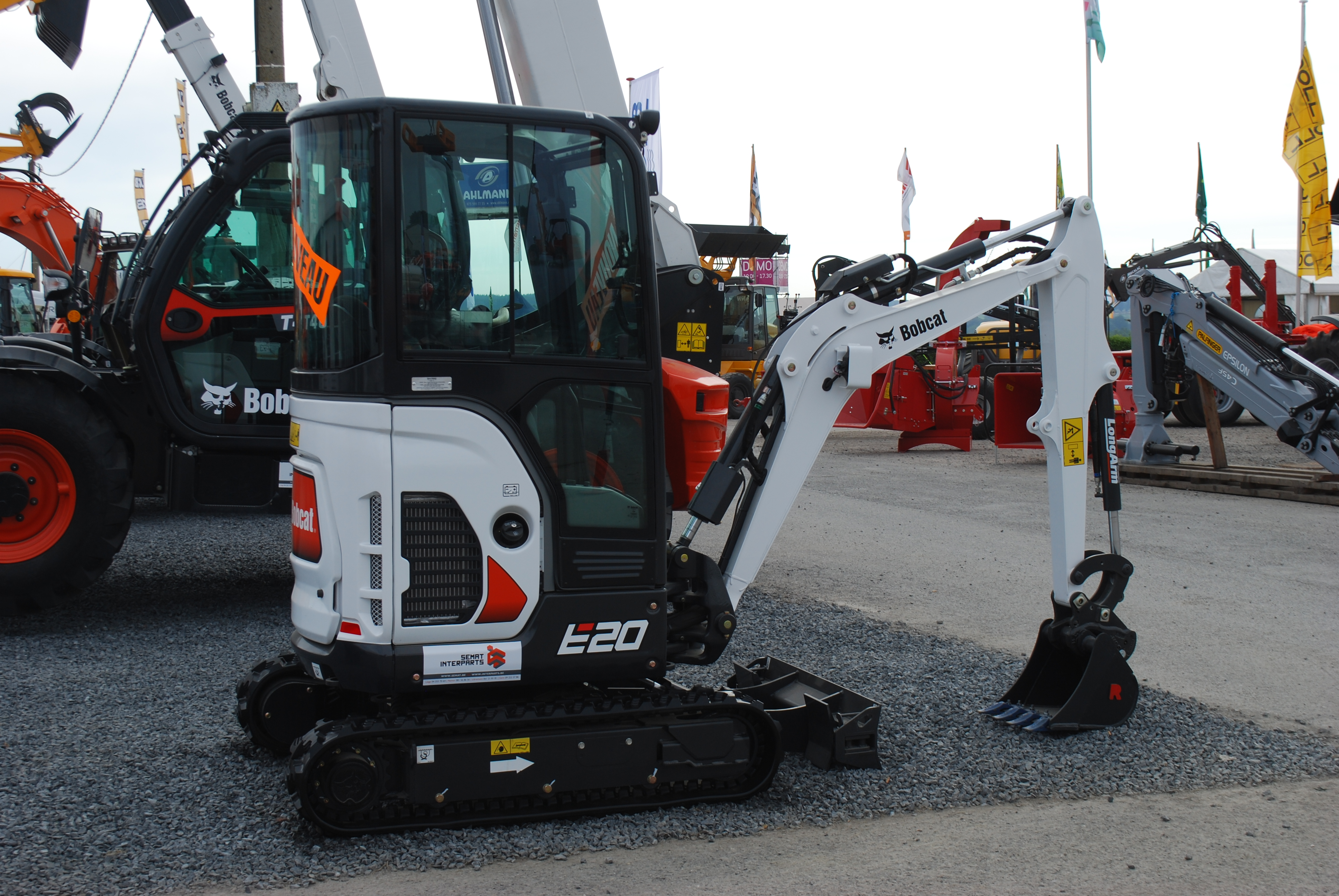
A Bobcat compact excavator

A compact or mini excavator is a tracked or wheeled vehicle with an approximate operating weight of up to 8.5 tonnes. It generally includes a standard backfill blade and features independent boom swing. At the lightest end, machines with an operating weight below one tonne are commonly called micro excavators.

Hydraulic excavators are somewhat different from other construction equipment in that all movement and functions of the machine are accomplished through the transfer of hydraulic fluid. The compact excavator's work group and blade are activated by hydraulic fluid acting upon hydraulic cylinders. The excavator's slew (rotation) and travel functions are also activated by hydraulic fluid powering hydraulic motors.

== History ==
The compact excavator has its origins with equipment manufacturer Akio Takeuchi who founded the Takeuchi Manufacturing company in 1963. Created as an improvement to overcome issues that other manufacturers typically ignored. It was first introduced in 1971 when Akio was asked to create a smaller excavator that could work specifically on house foundations. This excavator was more compact, versatile and able to perform greater than its larger counterparts.

== Micro excavators ==
Micro excavators are the lightest compact excavators. The term is generally applied to machines with an operating weight below 1 t (1,000 kg; 2,200 lb). Their narrow dimensions suit space-restricted urban sites and other locations with limited access. Some models use hydraulically expanding tracks: the tracks retract to reduce access width and extend to improve stability while digging or travelling.

Published weights are not always directly comparable because manufacturers use terms such as machine mass, machine weight and operating weight, and the figure may depend on configuration. Examples in the sub-one-tonne class include:

Selected micro excavator models
Manufacturer	Model	Published weight	Overall width	Power or control feature
Kobelco	SK005-6	550 kg (1,210 lb) machine mass	580 mm (23 in)	5.5 kW engine
Komatsu	PC01E-2	330 kg (730 lb) operating weight	580 mm (23 in)	Battery-electric, using swappable power packs
Yanmar	SV05-D	570 kg (1,260 lb) machine mass	580 mm (23 in)	5.5 kW engine

== Structure ==
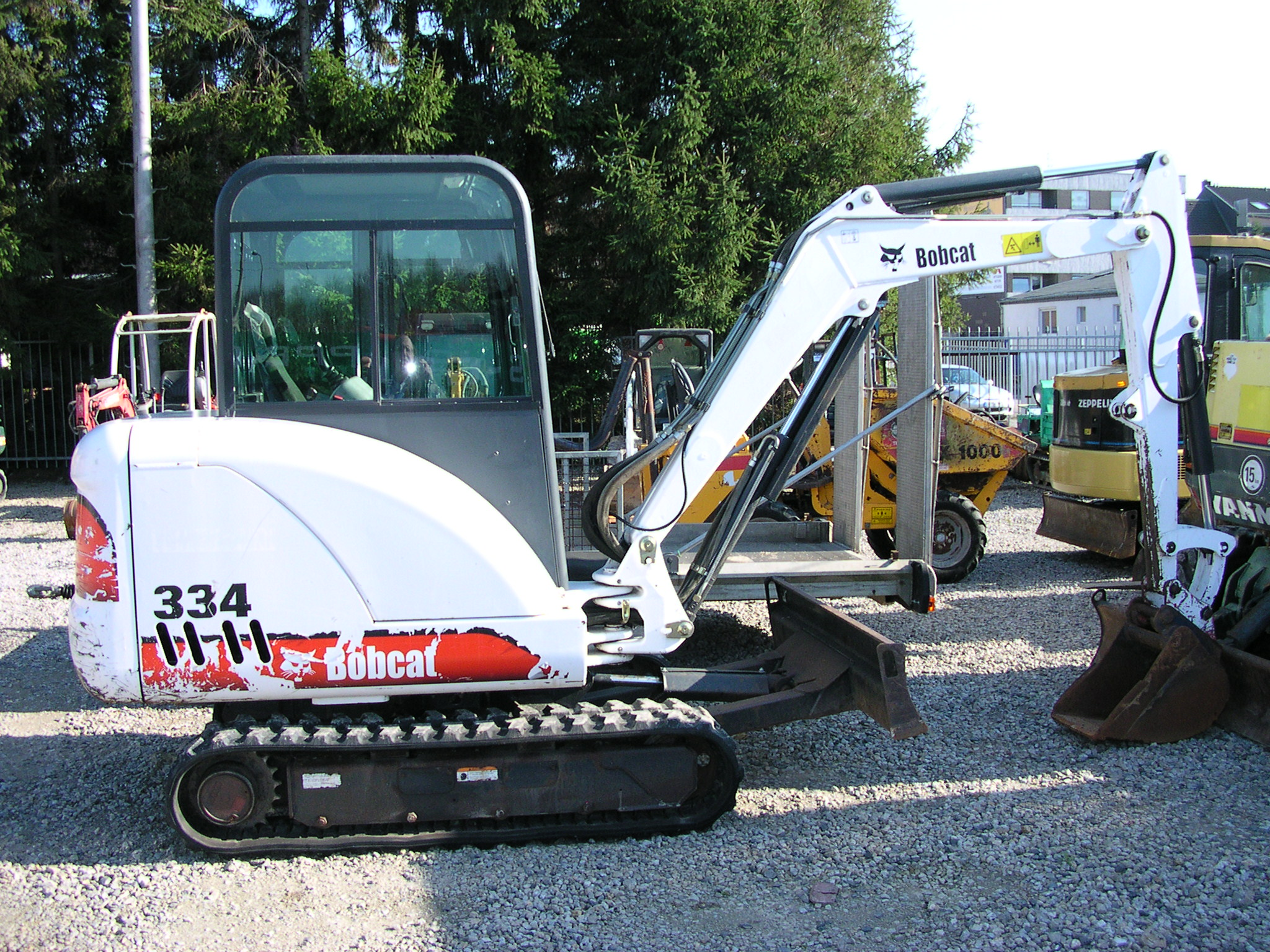
A Bobcat mini excavator. Note the backfill blade

Most compact hydraulic excavators have three distinct assemblies: house, undercarriage and workgroup.

=== House ===
The house structure contains the operator's compartment, engine compartment, hydraulic pump and distribution components. The house structure is attached to the top of the undercarriage via a swing bearing. The house, along with the workgroup, is able to rotate or slew upon the undercarriage without limit due to a hydraulic distribution valve which supplies oil to the undercarriage components.

==== Slew ====
Slewing refers to rotating the excavator's house assembly. Unlike a conventional backhoe, the operator can slew the entire house and workgroup upon the undercarriage for spoil placement.

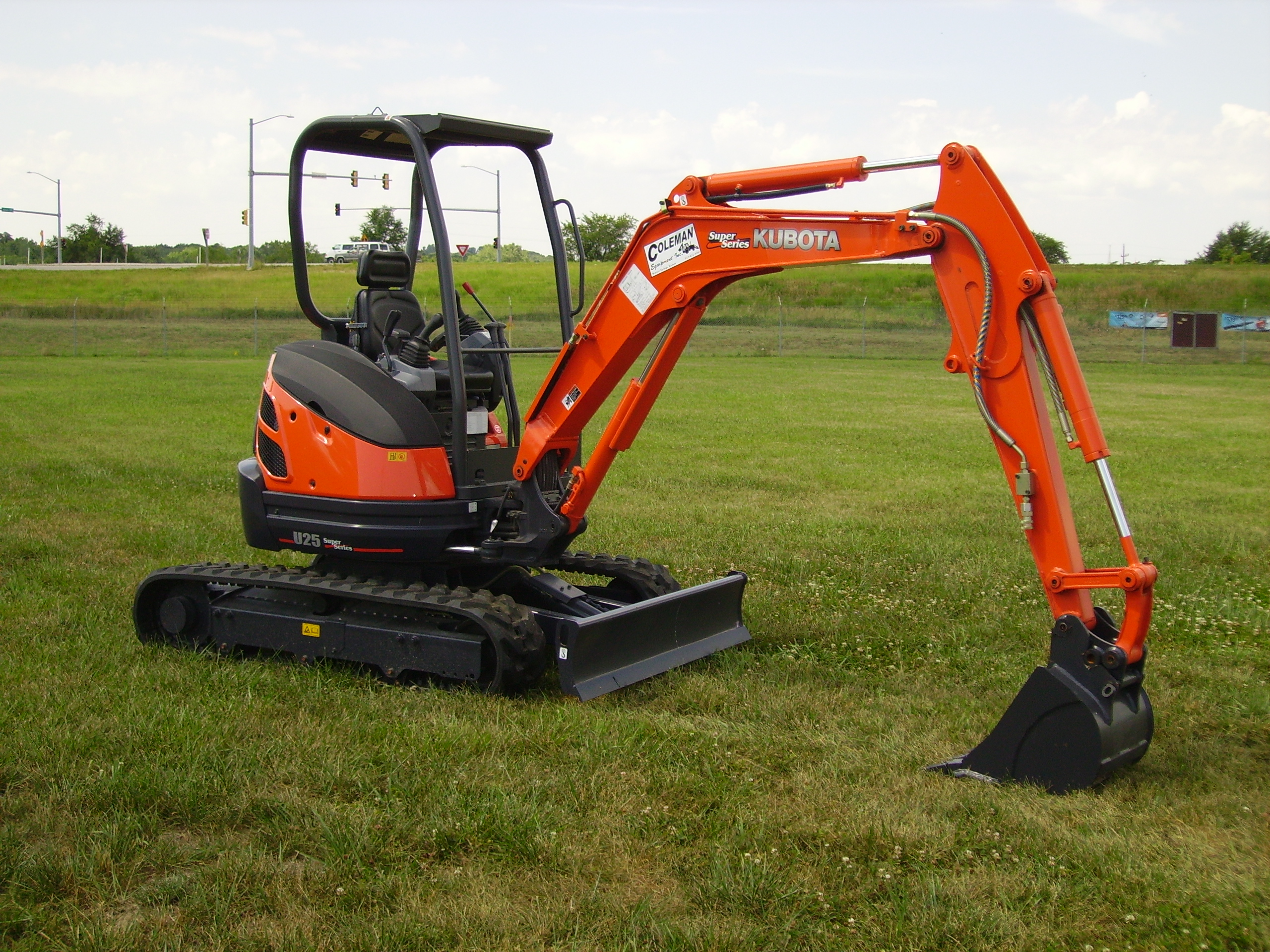
A Kubota compact excavator

=== Undercarriage ===
The undercarriage consists of rubber or steel tracks, drive sprockets, rollers, idlers and associated components/structures. The undercarriage supports the house structure and the workgroup.

=== Workgroup ===
The workgroup of a compact hydraulic excavator consists of the boom, dipper or arm, and attachment (e.g. auger, bucket or breaker). It is connected to the front of the excavator's house structure via a swing frame that allows the workgroup to be hydraulically pivoted left or right to achieve offset digging for trenching parallel with the tracks. Certain manufacturers including Terex and Caterpillar (CAT) offer an extendable boom option, much like the extendable boom of a backhoe loader.

=== Independent boom swing ===
The primary purpose of boom swing is for offset digging around obstacles or along foundations, walls or forms. A secondary use is cycling in areas too narrow for cab rotation. Independent boom swing is one of the major advantages of a compact excavator over other excavation equipment.

=== Backfill blade ===
The backfill blade is used for grading, leveling, backfilling, trenching, and general dozer work. The blade can be used to increase dump height and digging depth depending on its position in relation to the excavator's workgroup, this makes it very versatile. It is also used to stabilize the machine while digging.

== Attachments ==
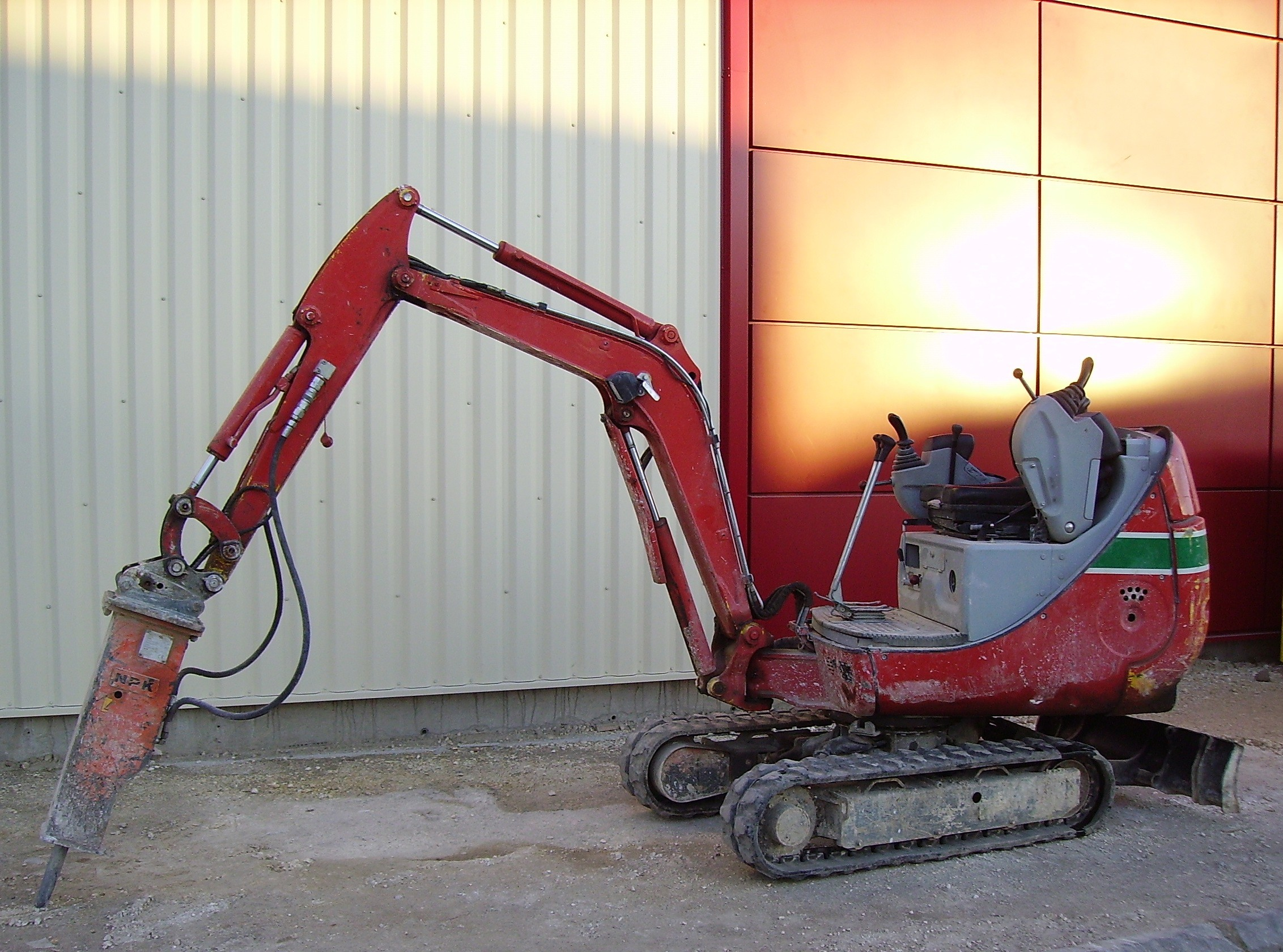
A NPK breaker fitted to a Wacker Neuson compact excavator

In recent years, hydraulic excavator capabilities have expanded far beyond excavation tasks. With the advent of hydraulic powered attachments such as a tiltrotator, breaker, a grapple or an auger, the excavator is frequently used in many applications other than excavation and with the tiltrotator attachment, actually serves as an effective tool carrier. Many excavators feature quick coupler (quick-attach) mounting systems for simplified attachment mounting, dramatically increasing the machine's utilization on the jobsite.

== Zero-tail swing ==
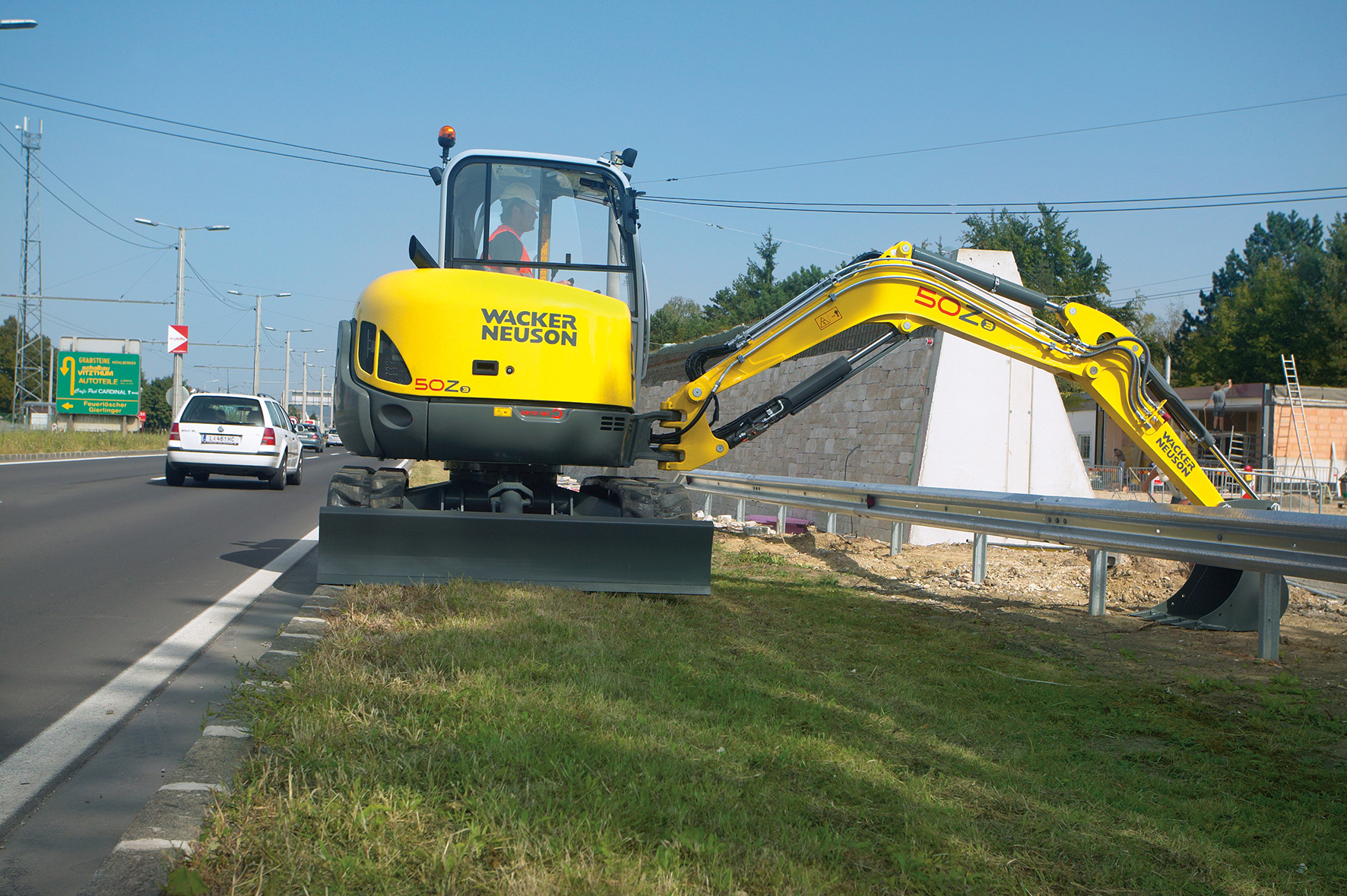
A Wacker Neuson excavator with zero-tail. The tail does not extend to the street.

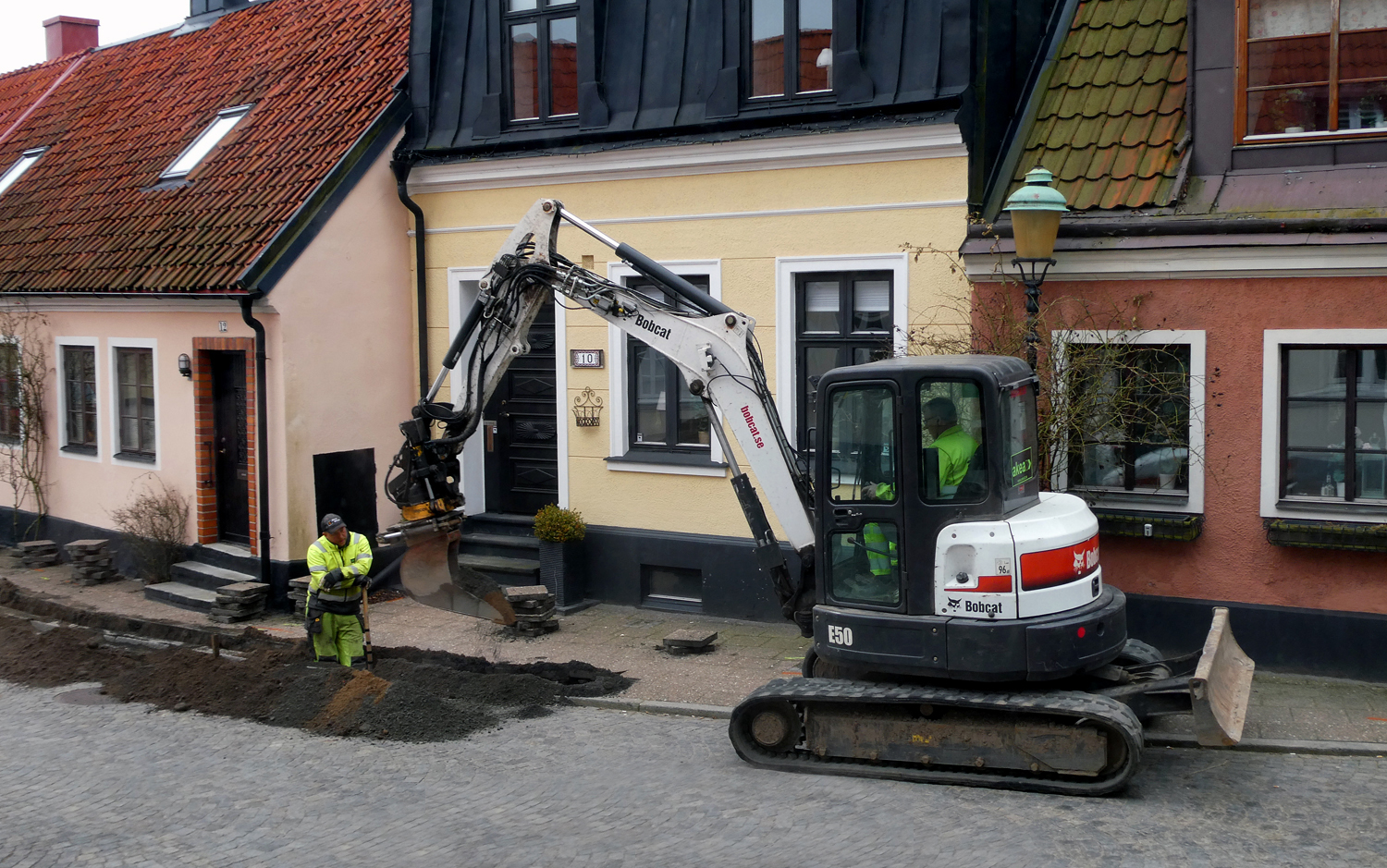
A Bobcat excavator digging for the laying of a broadband cable in central Ystad.

There are two distinct classes of compact excavators, conventional tail swing - units that have a rear counterweight that will extend beyond the tracks when the house rotates, and zero-tail swing - units with a house whose diameter stays within the width of the tracks through full rotation. Zero-tail swing units allow operators to focus on digging and not looking at where they are swinging and are intended for operation in limited spaces, like next to a wall.

== Notable manufacturers ==
- Bobcat Company
- Caterpillar Inc.
- CASE CE
- CNH Global
- Dingo Australia
- Doosan Infracore (formerly Daewoo Heavy Industries & Machinery) - including Solar brand
- Gehl
- Hitachi Construction Machinery
- JCB
- John Deere
- Kobelco (Kobe Steel Group)
- Komatsu Limited
- Kubota
- IHI Construction Machinery
- Takeuchi Manufacturing
- Volvo Construction Equipment
- Wacker Neuson
- Yanmar
