= Takeuchi Manufacturing =

Japanese heavy construction machinery company

- Native name: 株式会社竹内製作所
- Company type: Public
- Traded as: TYO: 6432
- Industry: Construction Machinery
- Founded: Sakaki (August 21, 1963; 62 years ago)
- Headquarters: Sakaki, Hanishina district, Nagano Prefecture 389-0605, Japan
- Key people: Akio Takeuchi (Founder); Toshiya Takeuchi (President)
- Products: Compact excavators; Track loaders
- Revenue: ▲JP¥ 94.3 billion (FY 2017) (US$ 846 million) (FY 2017)
- Net income: ▲JP¥ 9.5 billion (FY 2017) (US$ 85 million) (FY 2017)
- Number of employees: 691 (as of February 28, 2018)
- Website: Official website

Takeuchi Mfg. Co., Ltd. (株式会社竹内製作所, Kabushiki-gaisha Takeuchi Seisakujo) is a Japanese heavy construction machinery company that manufactures excavators, track loaders, crawler dumpers and wheel loaders.

== History ==
Takeuchi was founded in 1963 by Akio Takeuchi as a construction equipment manufacturer. Takeuchi developed the world's first compact excavator in 1971 and in 1986 he introduced the compact track loader, another world first.

The company has wholly owned subsidiary facilities in the United States (1979), United Kingdom (1996), France (2000) and China (2006).

== Gallery ==
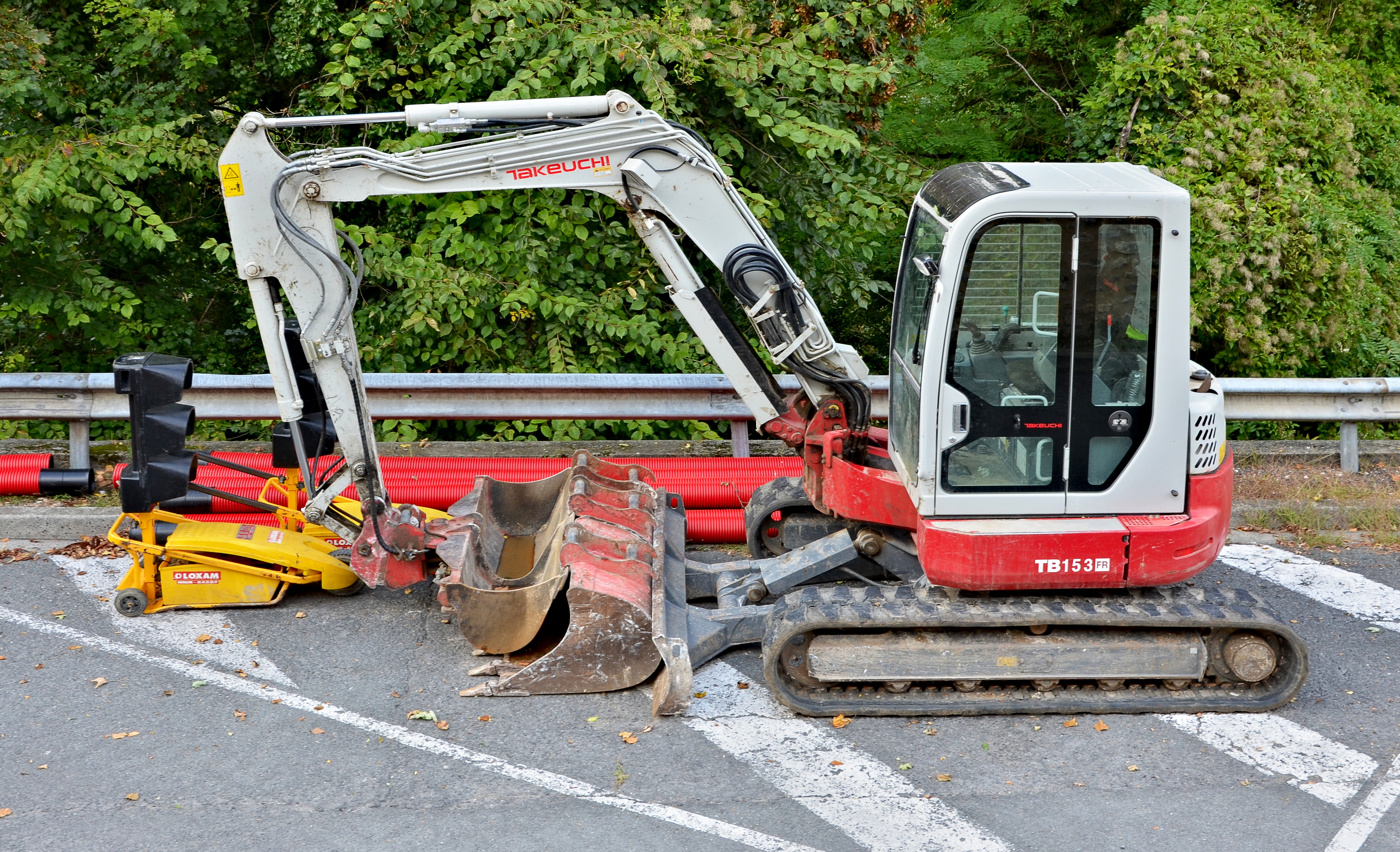
A Takeuchi compact excavator in Angoulême, France

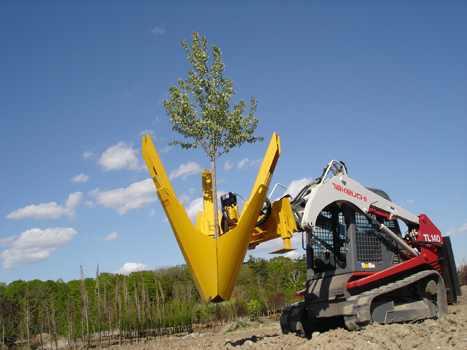
A tree spade on an older model Takeuchi track loader.

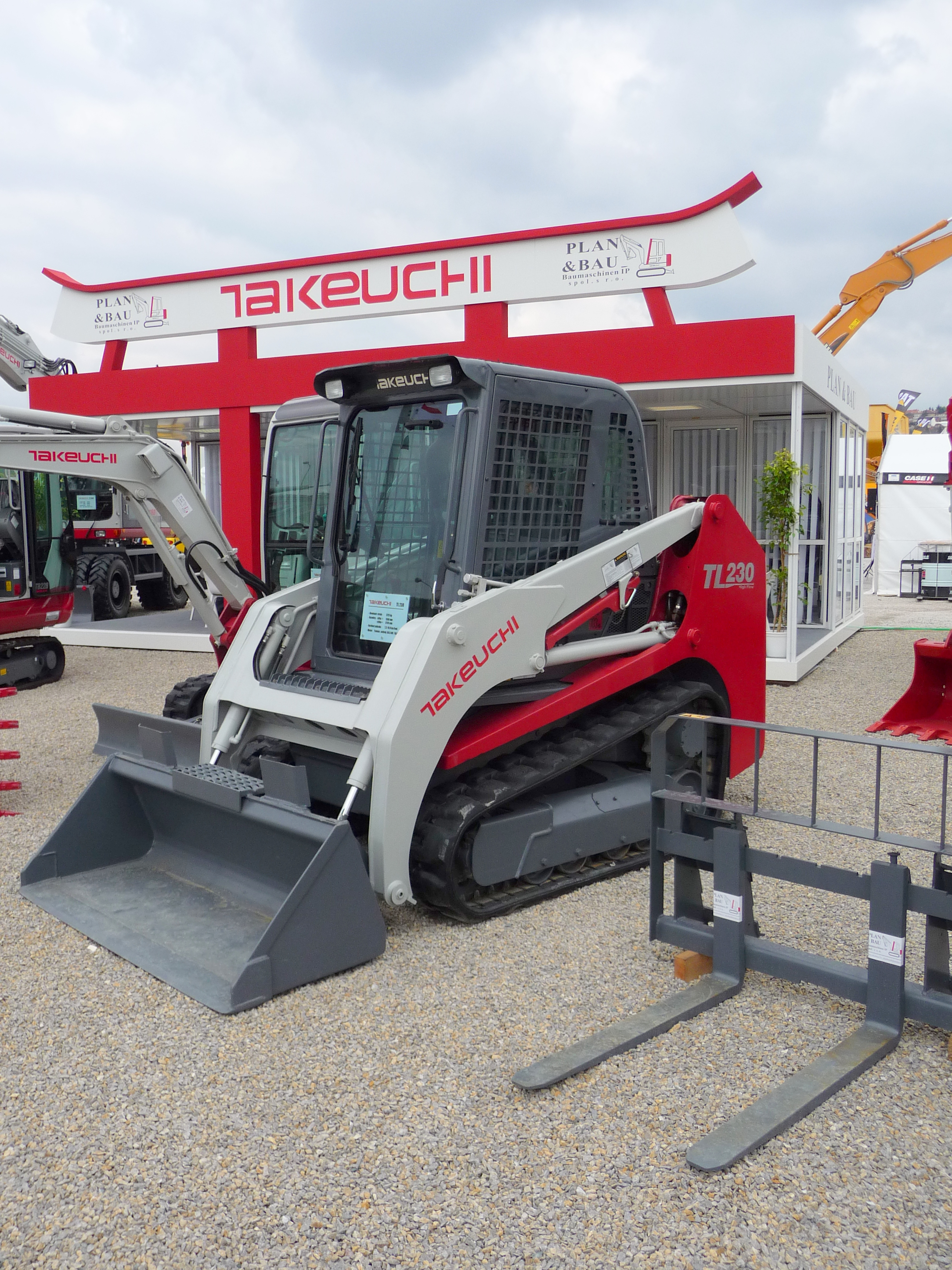
A Takeuchi track loader at the Building Fair in Brno, Czech Republic
