= Backhoe =

Type of excavating equipment (vehicle)

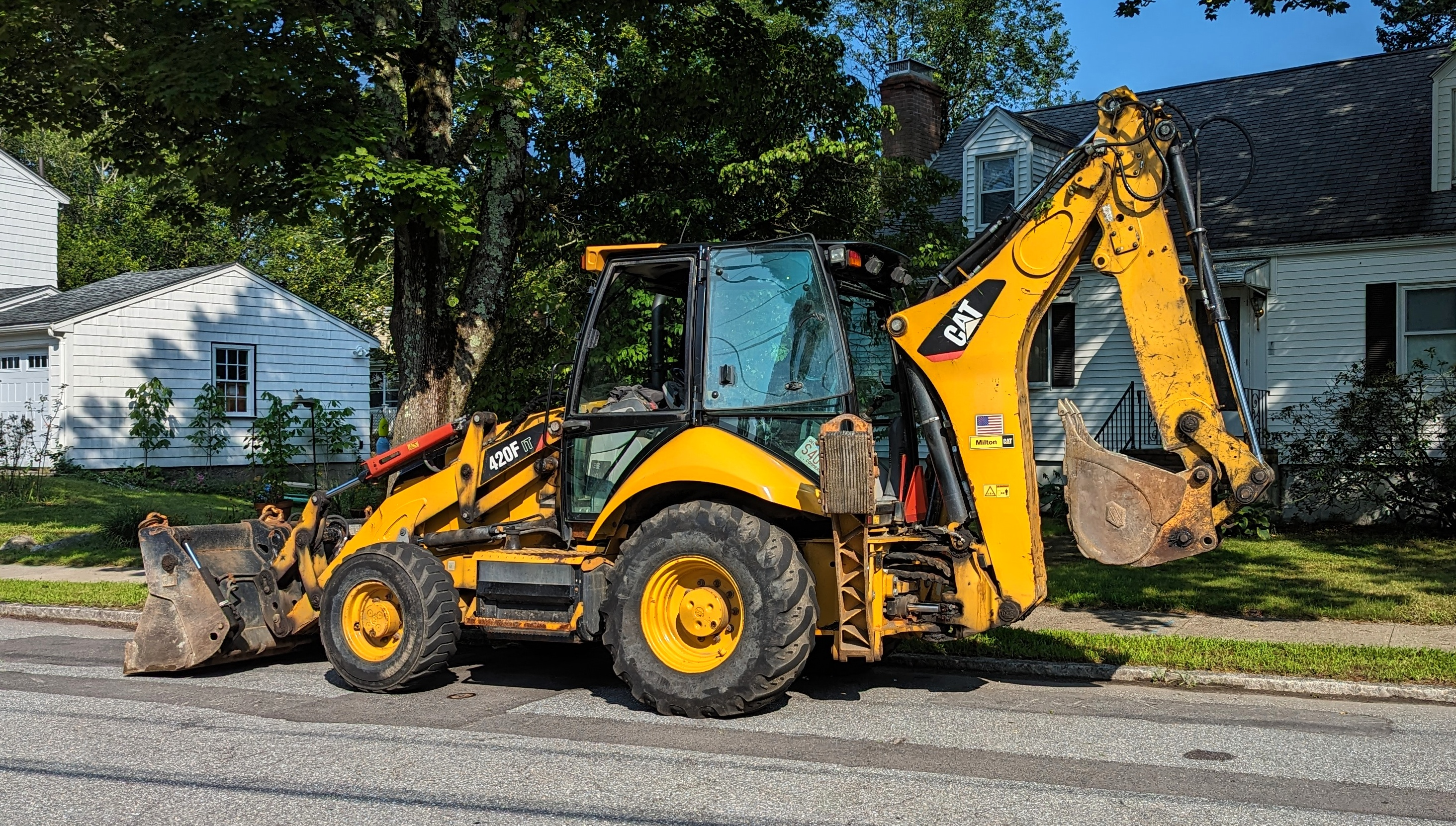
A Cat 420F In Arlington Massachusetts USA

A backhoe (Note: Also called a rear actor, or a back actor.) is a type of excavating equipment, or excavator, consisting of a digging bucket on the end of a two-part articulated arm. It is typically mounted on the back of a tractor or front loader, the latter forming a "backhoe loader" (a US term, but known as a "JCB" in Ireland and the UK). The section of the arm closest to the vehicle is known as the boom, while the section that carries the bucket is known as the dipper (or dipper-stick), both terms derived from steam shovels. The boom, which is the long piece of the backhoe arm attached to the tractor through a pivot called the king-post, is located closest to the cab. It allows the arm to pivot left and right, typically through a range of 180 to 200 degrees, and also enables lifting and lowering movements.

== Description ==
Excavator digging in Tokyo, Japan

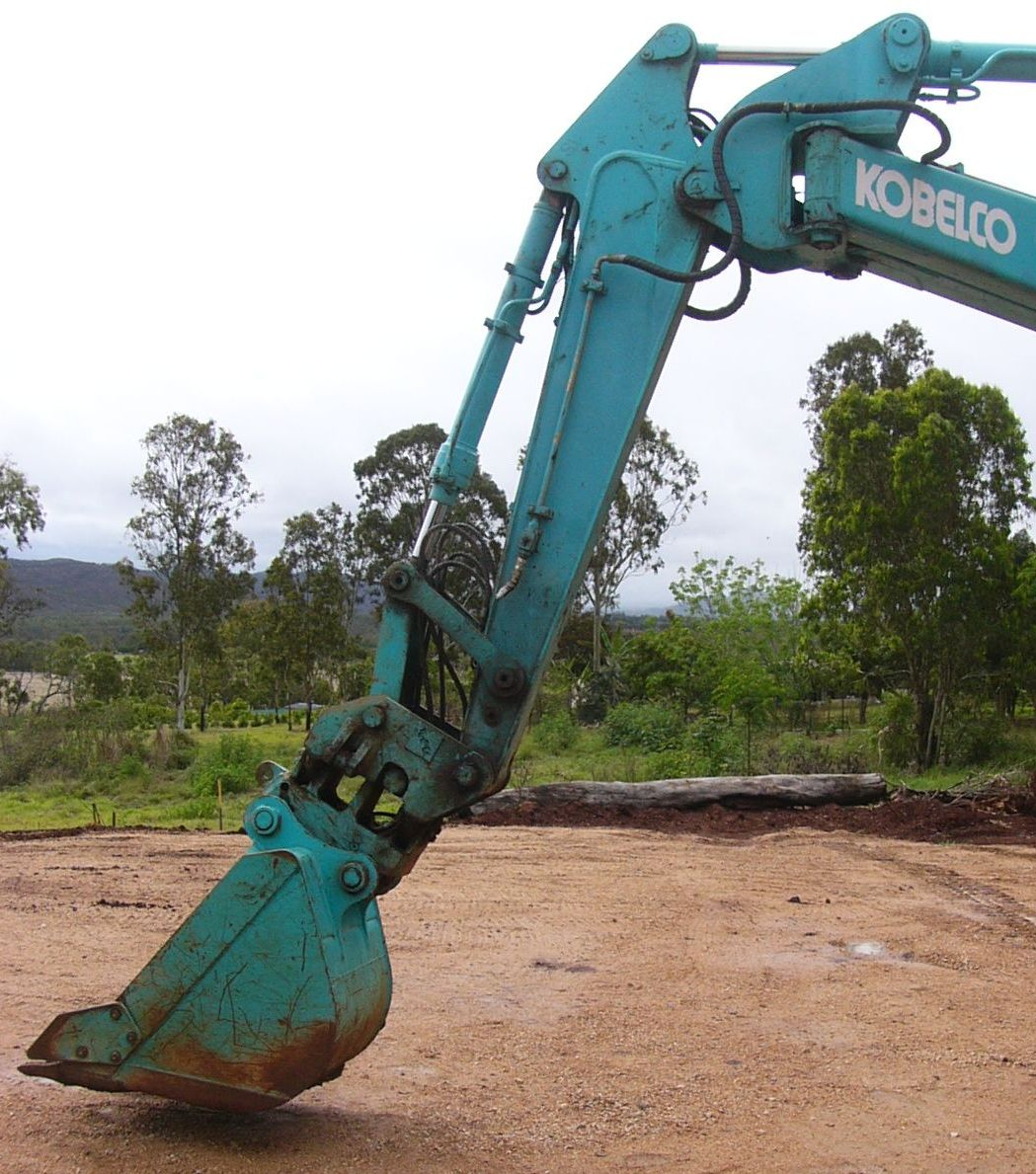
Kobelco Excavator in shovel configuration

The term "backhoe" refers to the action of the bucket, not its location on the vehicle. That is, a backhoe digs by drawing earth backwards, rather than lifting it with a forward motion like a person shovelling, a steam shovel, or a bulldozer. The buckets on some backhoes may be reconfigured facing forward, making them "hoes".

A tractor-loader backhoe (TLB) is a tractor-like vehicle with a backhoe at the rear, a front loader on the other and a swivelling seat to position the operator facing whichever direction is needed at the time. In North America, this arrangement is often referred to as simply a backhoe, or when on a chassis originally derived from farm tractors, a tractor-loader backhoe. To differentiate, a backhoe on its own dedicated chassis may then be referred to as an excavator.

Backhoe loaders can be designed and manufactured from the start as such, or can be the result of a farm tractor equipped with a front end loader (FEL) and rear backhoe. Though similar looking, the purpose-designed backhoe loaders are much stronger, with the farm variation unsuitable for heavy work.

With the advent of hydraulic powered attachments such as a tiltrotator, breaker, a grapple or an auger, the backhoe is frequently used in many applications other than excavation and with the tiltrotator attachment serves as an effective tool carrier. Many backhoes feature quick coupler (quick-attach) mounting systems for simplified attachment mounting, dramatically increasing the machine's utilization on the job site. Backhoes are usually employed together with loaders and bulldozers. Excavators that use a backhoe are sometimes called "trackhoes" by people who do not realize the name is due to the action of the bucket, not its location on a backhoe loader.

Backhoe loaders are general-purpose tools, and are being displaced to some extent by multiple specialist tools like the excavator and the speciality front-end loader, especially with the rise of the mini-excavator. On many job sites which would have previously seen a backhoe used, a skid-steer loader and a mini excavator will be used in conjunction to fill the backhoe's role. However, backhoes are still in general use. The difference between the backhoe and the skid-steer loader, are that the backhoe has attachments back and front, where as the skid-steer loader only has front attachments, however, the attachment versatility on a skid-steer loader is much greater.

Sometimes a backhoe bucket is reversed to work in a power shovel configuration.

Sometimes a backhoe arm is used as a crane, by slinging the lifted object from the support linkages behind the scoop (advisably not from the teeth, preferably from a hook welded on a bucket, quick coupler or tiltrotator).

== History ==
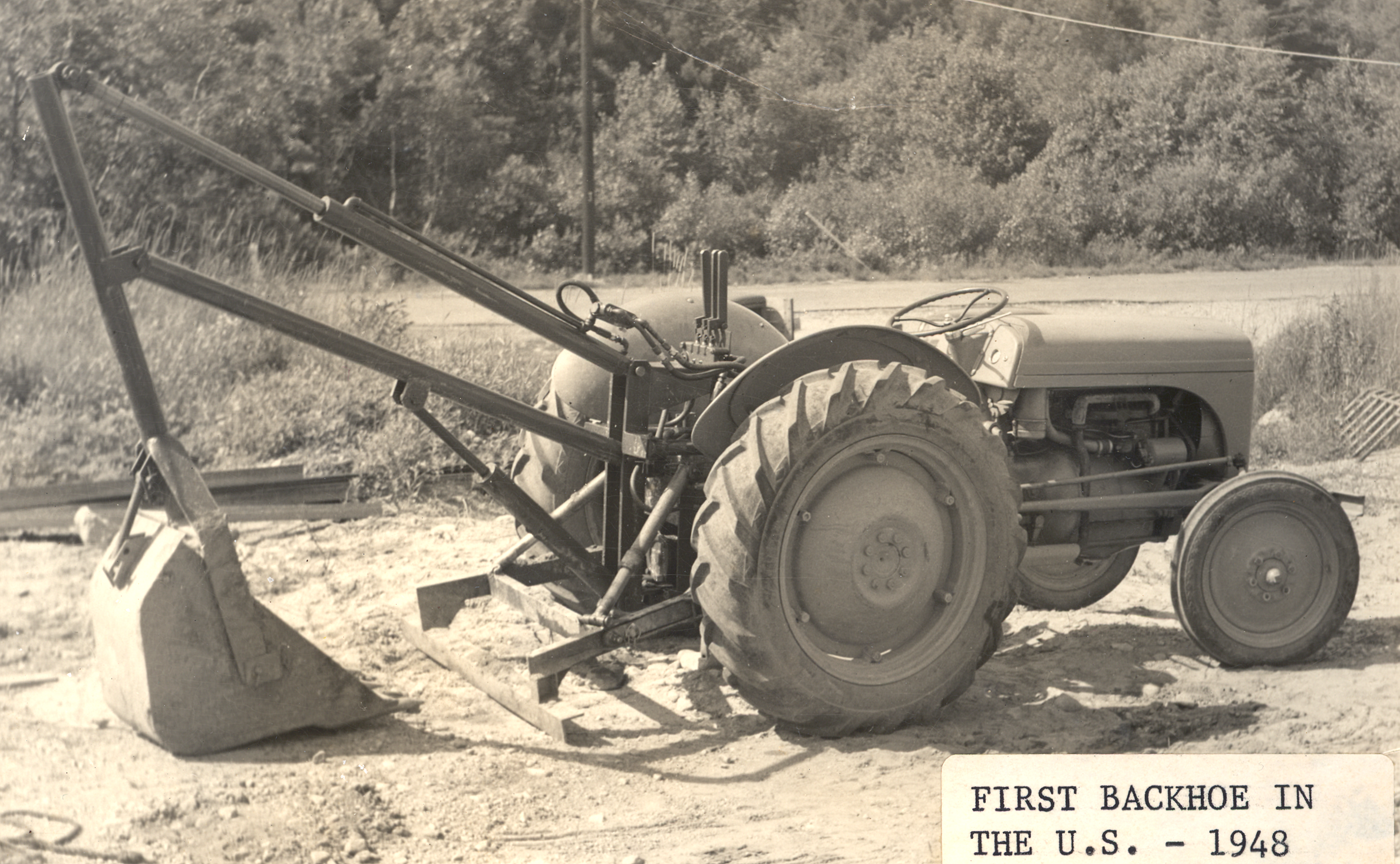
Wain-Roy Backhoe mounted to a Ford tractor 1948

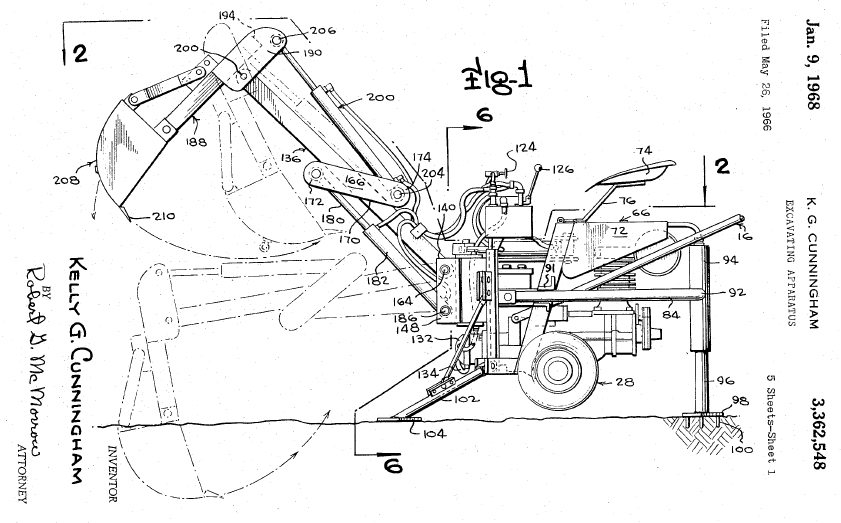
Terramite T1 US Patent# 3362548A

The backhoe swing frame was invented in 1947 by Vaino (pronounced "Waino") J. Holopainen and Roy E. Handy Jr. The swing frame "allowed the hydraulic digging arm to swing to the side to dump the bucket under US patent # 2,698,697". In April 1948 Wain-Roy Corporation sold the first hydraulic backhoe, mounted to a Ford Model 8N tractor, to the Connecticut Light and Power Company for $705.

The first tractor-loader backhoe was a Wain-Roy backhoe mounted to a Frank G. Hough model "HE" in 1952 in Holden, Massachusetts, US, for the Holden Water Department. The F.G. Hough Company was a subsidiary of the International Harvester Company. By early 1954, two Hough "Payloader" model wheel loaders, the HE and the HF, were available with Wain-Roy backhoes. In 1954 the Wain-Roy Corporation negotiated a deal with IH for the Hough TLB full-scale production on several other models of Hough loaders.

In the same year, JCB launched the first European hydraulic loader, followed by a backhoe with a 180° slew, fitted to a tractor, in 1953. In 1957, Case developed the first integrated tractor backhoe loader at the Case New Holland plant in Burlington, Iowa, helping contractors complete their work more efficiently.

JCB introduced the first dedicated backhoe loader, incorporating the excavator and the major loader in a single, all-purpose tool.

In 1960, Vaino Holopainen was introduced as "Mr. Backhoe" to Henry Ford II. Wain-Roy continued to produce them for Ford until 1963, when Ford started making their own. Wain-Roy Corporation later bought the AC Anderson Company. Although the Wain-Roy Corporation no longer exists, the Wain-Roy product line of backhoe attachments and couplers is still available through the Woods Equipment Company of Rockford, Illinois, US. In 1965, Kelly G. Cunningham used the 7.6 Gravely Tractor to create the Terramite Model 1 compact backhoe, known as the T1.

Because of the long-time predominance of the JCB marque in the United Kingdom and Ireland, it has become a genericized trademark there, and backhoe-equipped diggers are commonly called JCBs, while the term "backhoe" as an excavator component is almost unknown to the general public in this context. The founder of the JCB company, Joseph Cyril Bamford, is the only Briton to be honored in the Association of Equipment Manufacturers Hall of Fame.

Backhoe sales in the United States have decreased in recent years due to advances in other technologies, like the compact track loader and compact excavator.

== Backhoe fade ==
"Backhoe fade" or "JCB fade" is a term coined by the telecommunications field to refer to accidental damage or complete severing of a communications cable by a backhoe or similar construction activity.

The term is a play on other types of signal loss, especially on wireless networks. Most of these cause a reduction in the signal, such as rain fade. A cable subjected to "backhoe fade" is instead a sudden and initially inexplicable loss of signal experienced when a cable is accidentally dug up and damaged or cut.

== Notable manufacturers ==
- Case CE, United States (subsidiary of CNH, Netherlands)
- Caterpillar Inc., United States
- Deere & Company, United States
- Ford Motor Company, United States
- Hitachi Construction Machinery (Europe), Netherlands (subsidiary of Hitachi Construction Machinery, Japan)
- Hydrema, Denmark
- JCB, United Kingdom
- Komatsu, Japan
- Kubota, Japan
- LiuGong, China
- Massey Ferguson, United States (subsidiary of AGCO, United States)
- Mecalac, France (backhoes manufactured by former Fermec unit in Coventry, England. Acquired from Terex in 2016)
- New Holland Construction, Italy
- Volvo Construction Equipment, Sweden (subsidiary of Volvo, Sweden)
- XCMG, China
- Hidromek, Turkey
- Rhinoceros, China

== See also ==
- Backhoe loader
