= New Holland Construction =

Construction machine manufacturer

- Industry: Heavy equipment
- Founded: New Holland, Pennsylvania, United States 1895
- Headquarters: Turin, Italy
- Area served: Worldwide
- Products: Backhoes; Excavators; Loaders
- Parent: CNH Industrial
- Website: construction.newholland.com

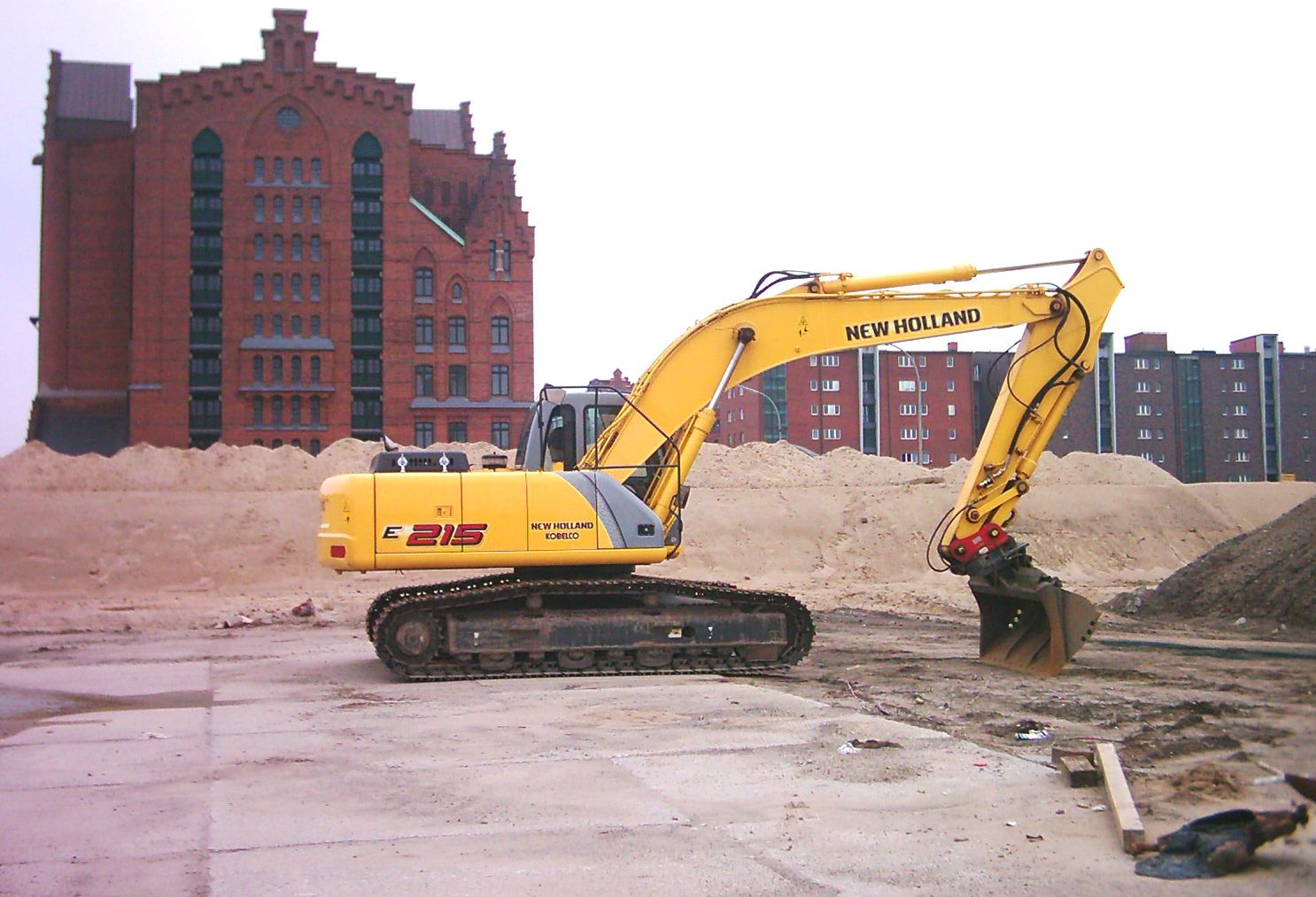
A famous New Holland excavator E 215 fitted with tilting bucket.

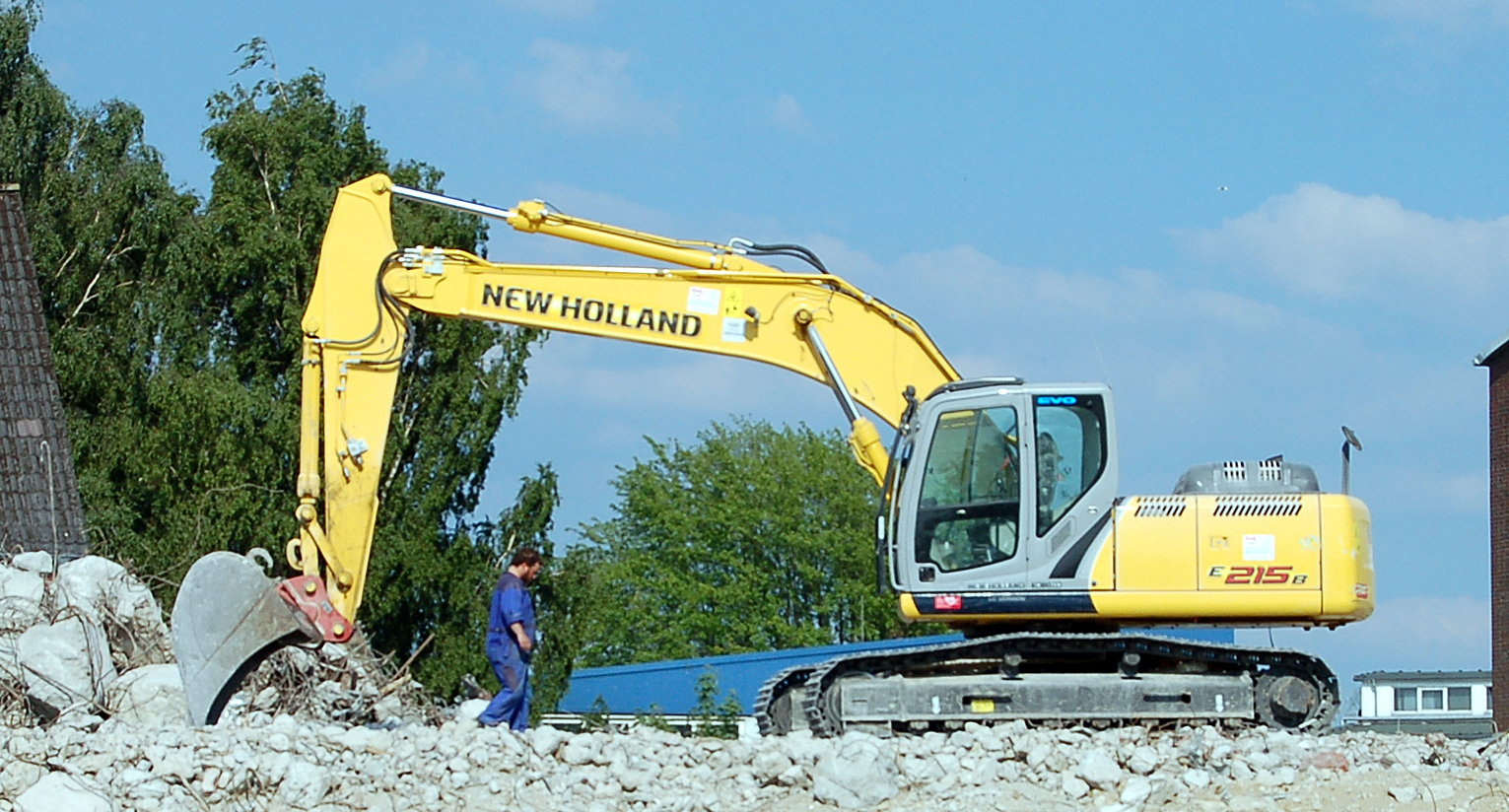
A New Holland excavator E 215B, upgrade of the previous version E 215.

New Holland Construction is a multinational construction machinery manufacturer founded in New Holland, Pennsylvania, and now based in Turin, Italy. New Holland Construction produces construction equipment including backhoes, excavators and loaders. Originally formed as the New Holland Machine Company in 1895, the company is now owned by CNH Industrial N. V., a company incorporated in the Netherlands.

== History ==
New Holland Construction was founded in 1895 in New Holland, Pennsylvania; in 2005 New Holland Construction Brand was created with a global full-line product offering. Since 1999, New Holland is a brand of CNH, which was demerged from Fiat Group to Fiat Industrial at the start of 2011.

== Operations ==
New Holland equipment is built all around the world; the headquarters is in Turin, Italy and with ten plants and ten research and development centers spread globally, more than 800 dealers and 2,100 outlets. It is present in 100 countries worldwide.

New Holland produces thirteen product families, five in the heavy range and eight in the light range; products include dozers, miniexcavators, graders, wheel loaders, crawler excavators, backhoe loaders, skid steer loaders.

== Factories ==
CNH Industrial manufactures equipment under the New Holland brand in factories in

City	Country	Product
San Mauro torinese, Turin	Italy	Excavators
Belo Horizonte	Brazil	Graders, Excavators, Crawler dozers
Lecce	Italy	Crawler dozers, Telescopic handlers, Wheel loaders, Loader backhoes
Modena	Italy	Skid steer loaders, Components
Wichita, Kansas	United States	Skid steer loaders

== Gallery ==
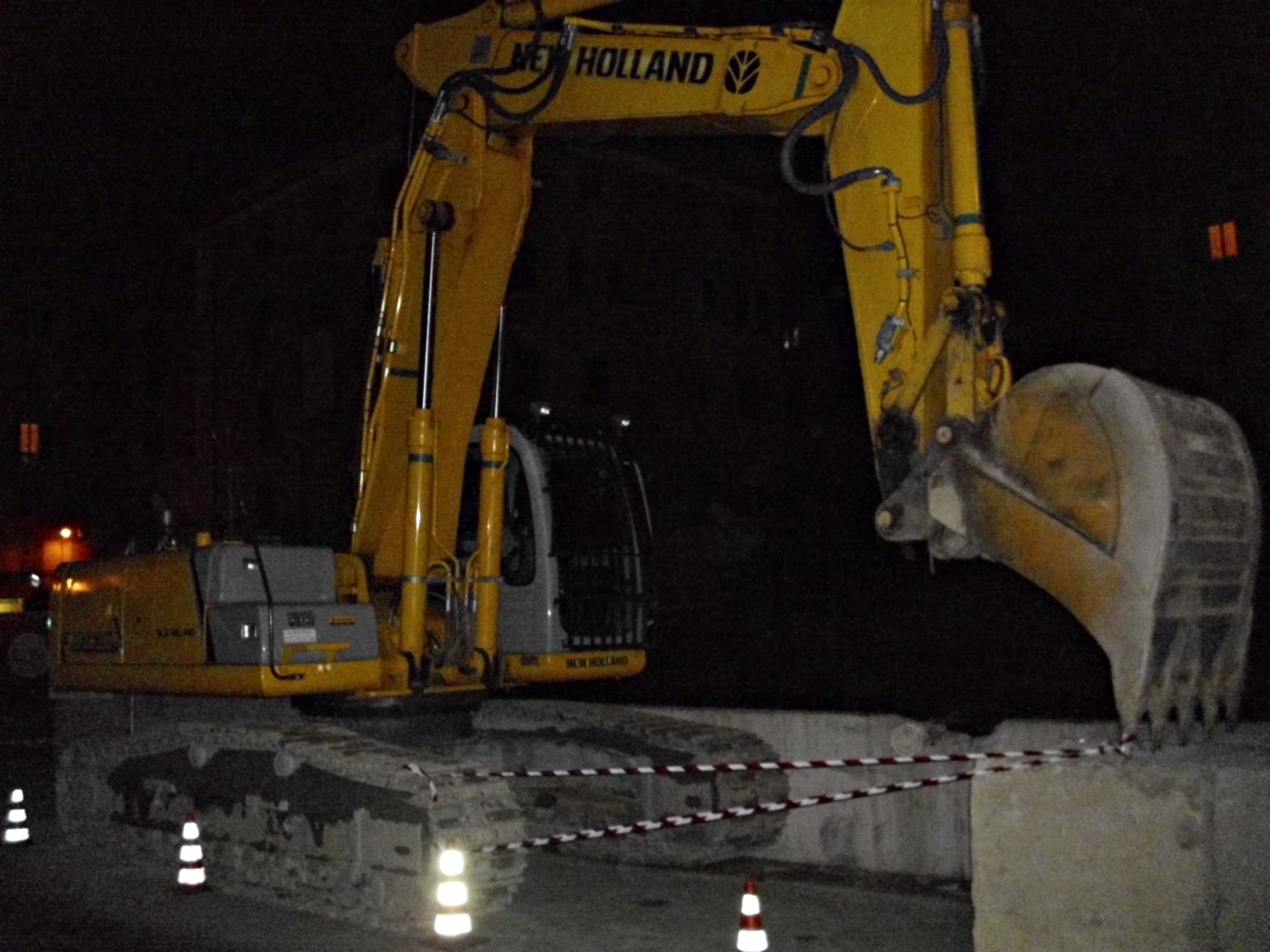
A New Holland E 305B in Italy.

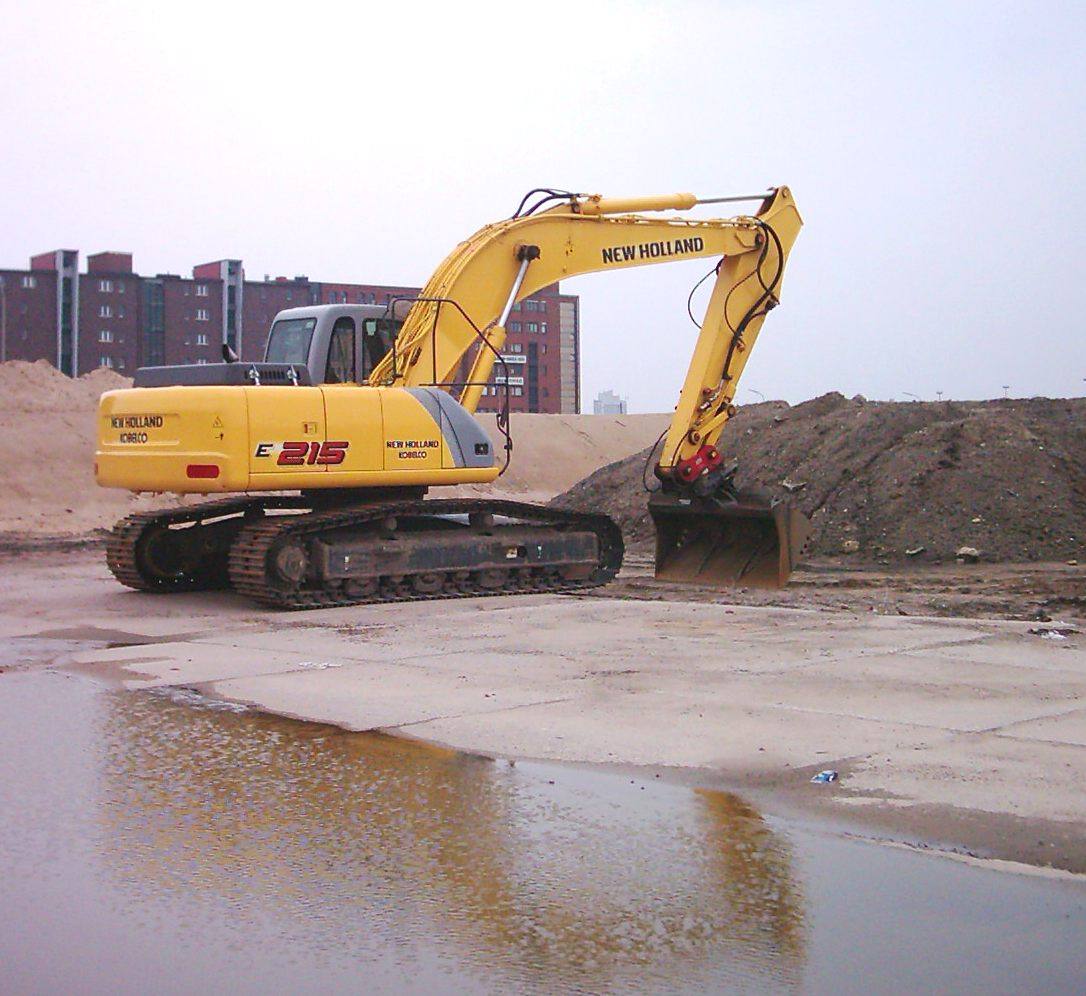
A New Holland E 215 in Germany.

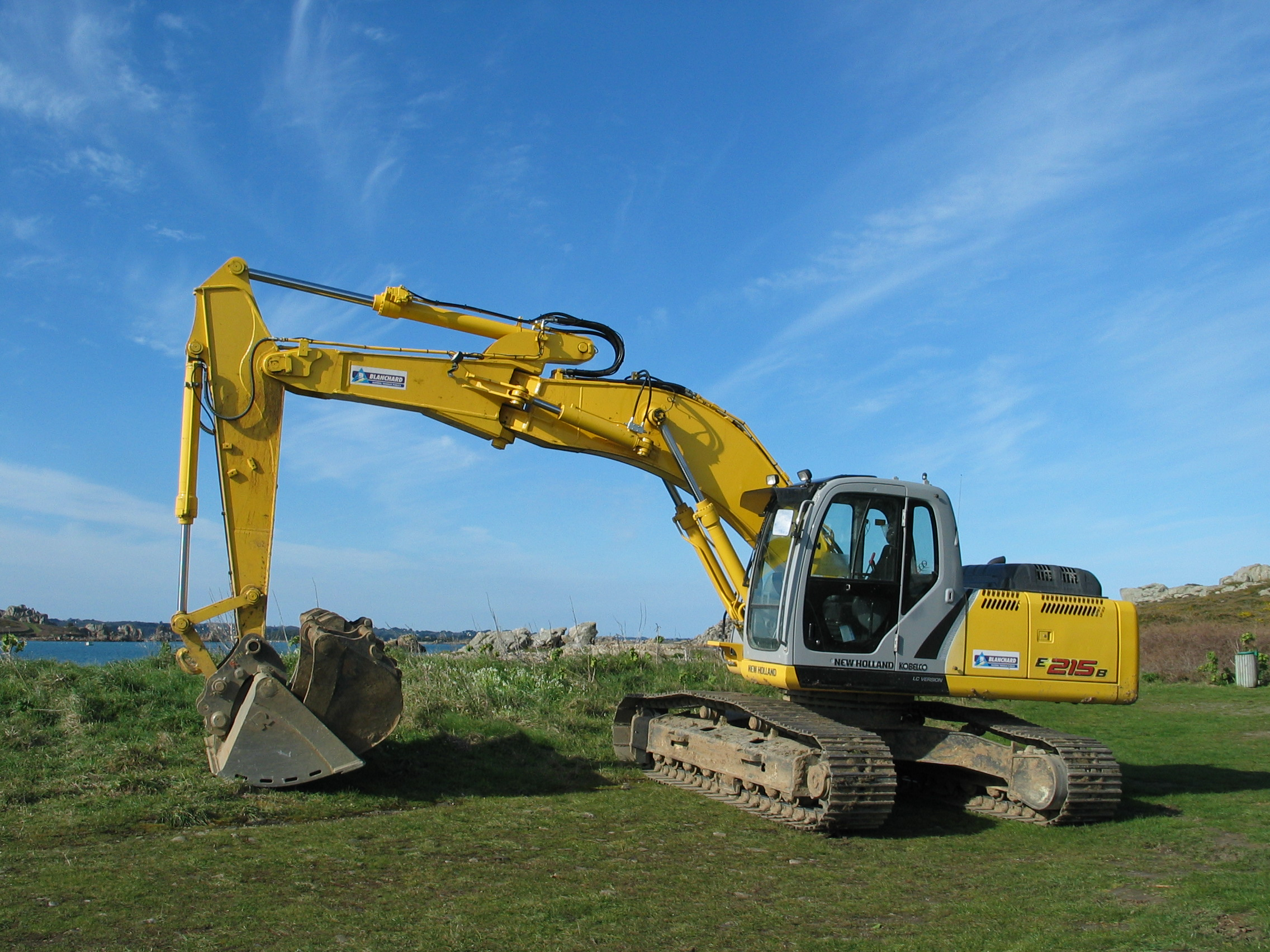
A New Holland E 215 with special Deportè articulation.

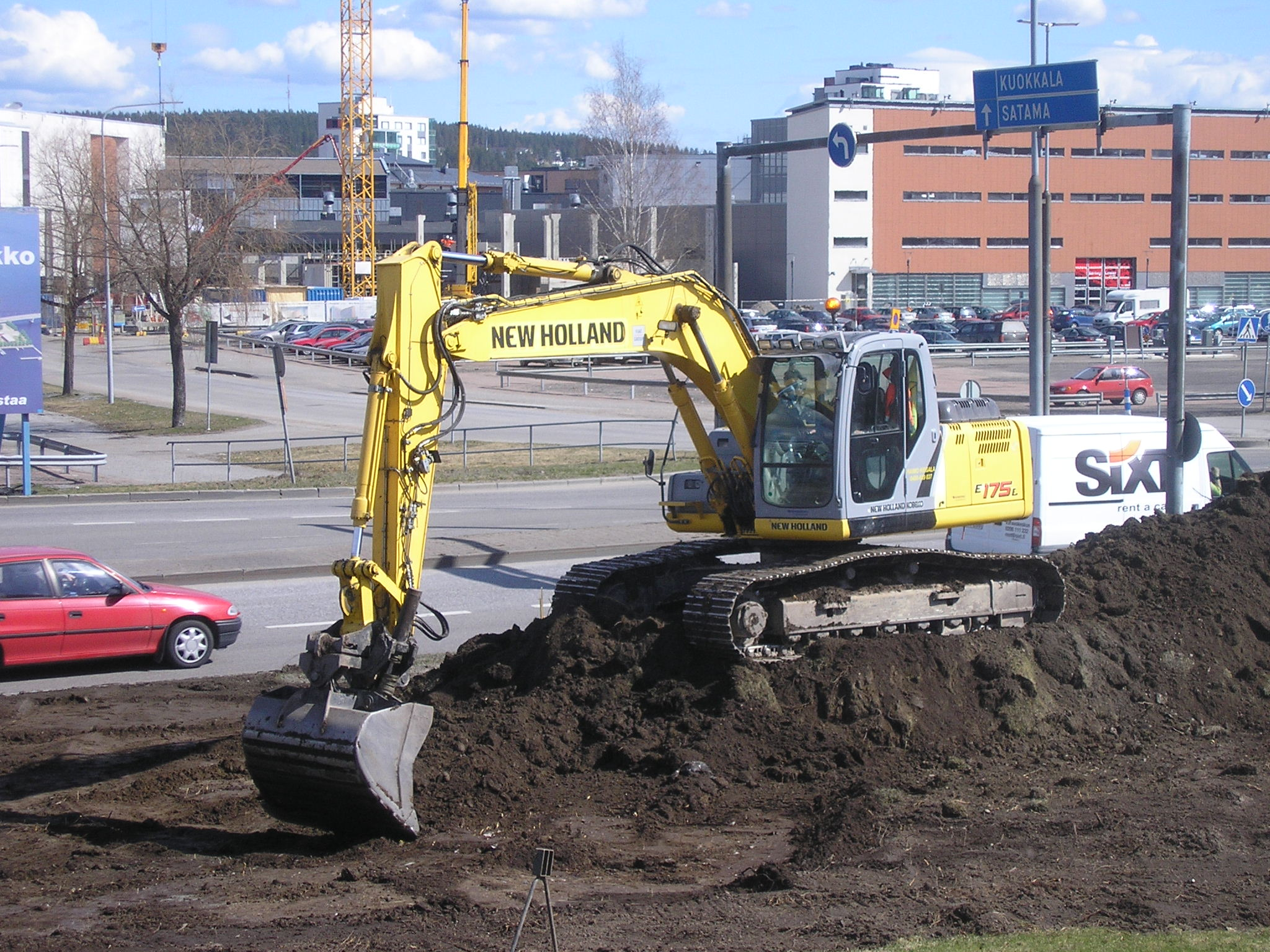
A New Holland E 175B in Finland.

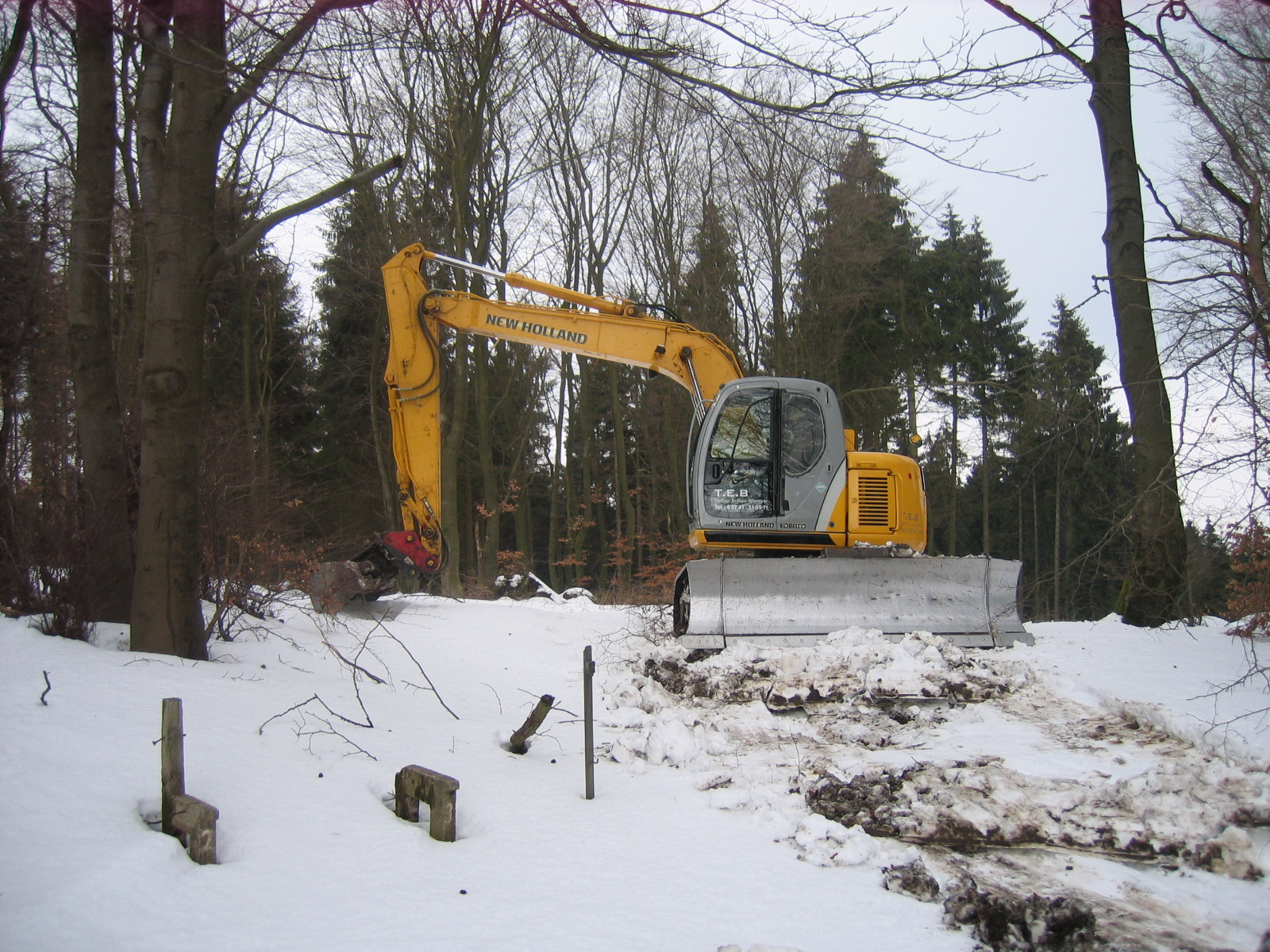
An excavator New Holland E 150 bladerunner in Germany.

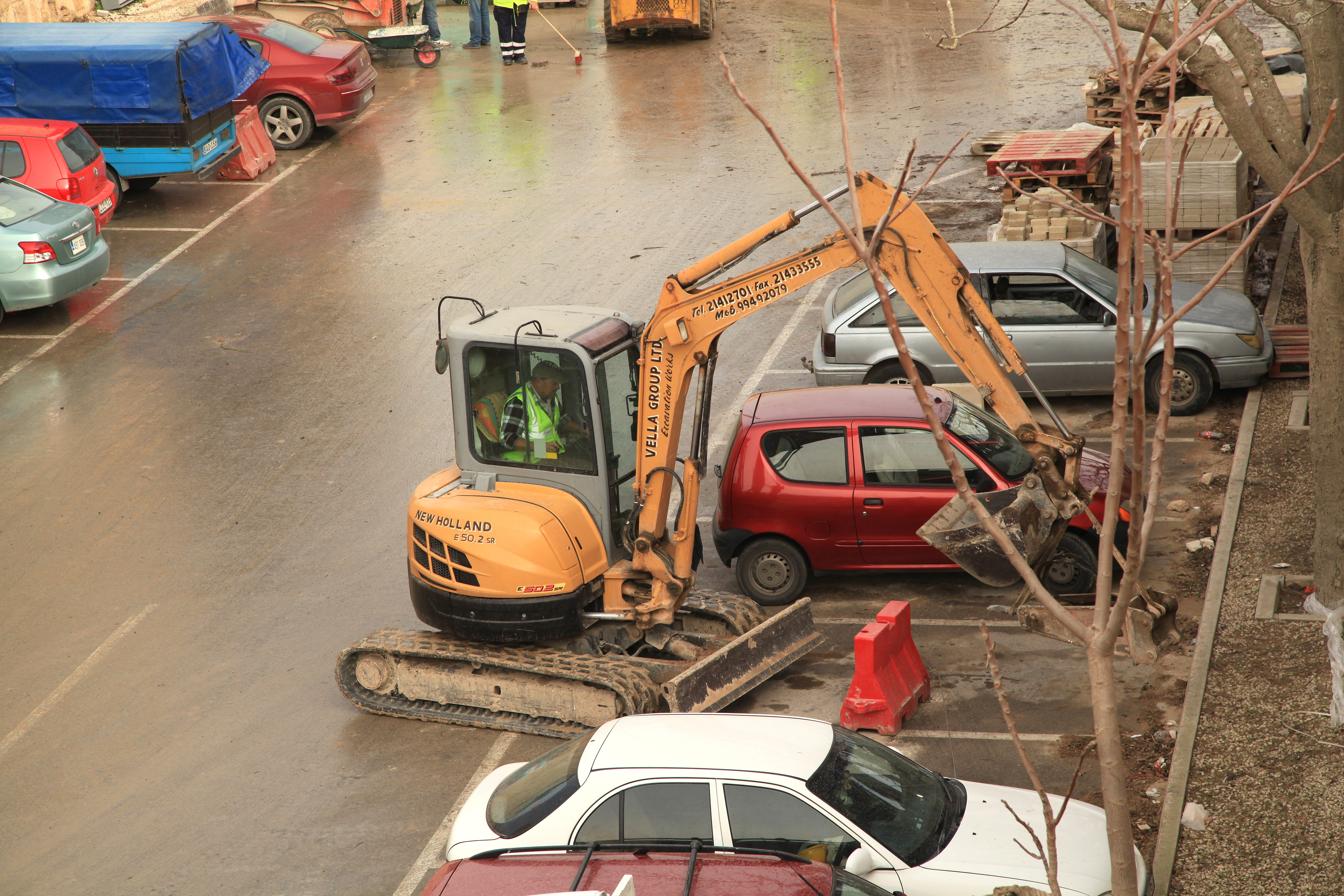
Mini-excavator New Holland in Malta.

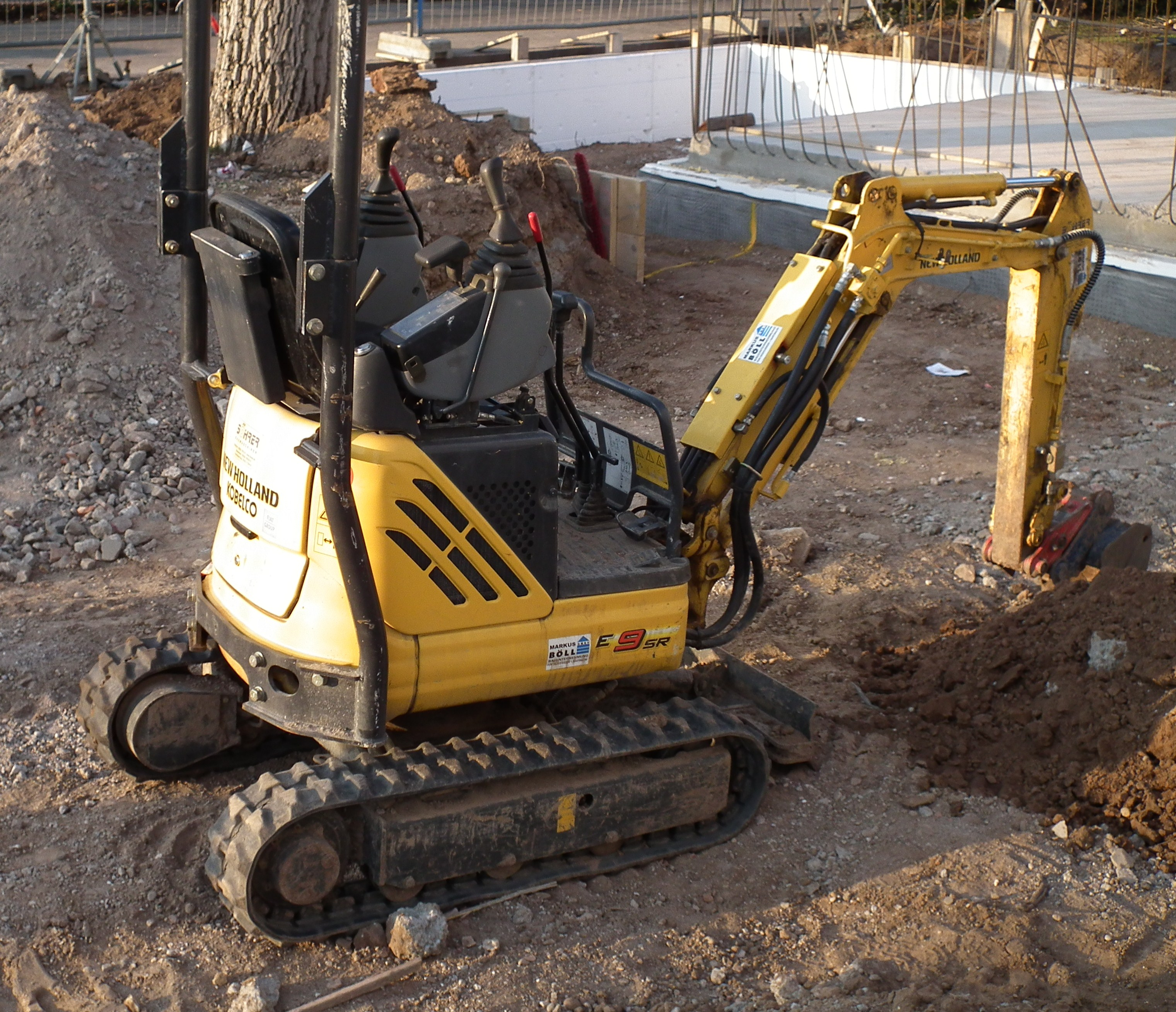
Small mini-excavator.

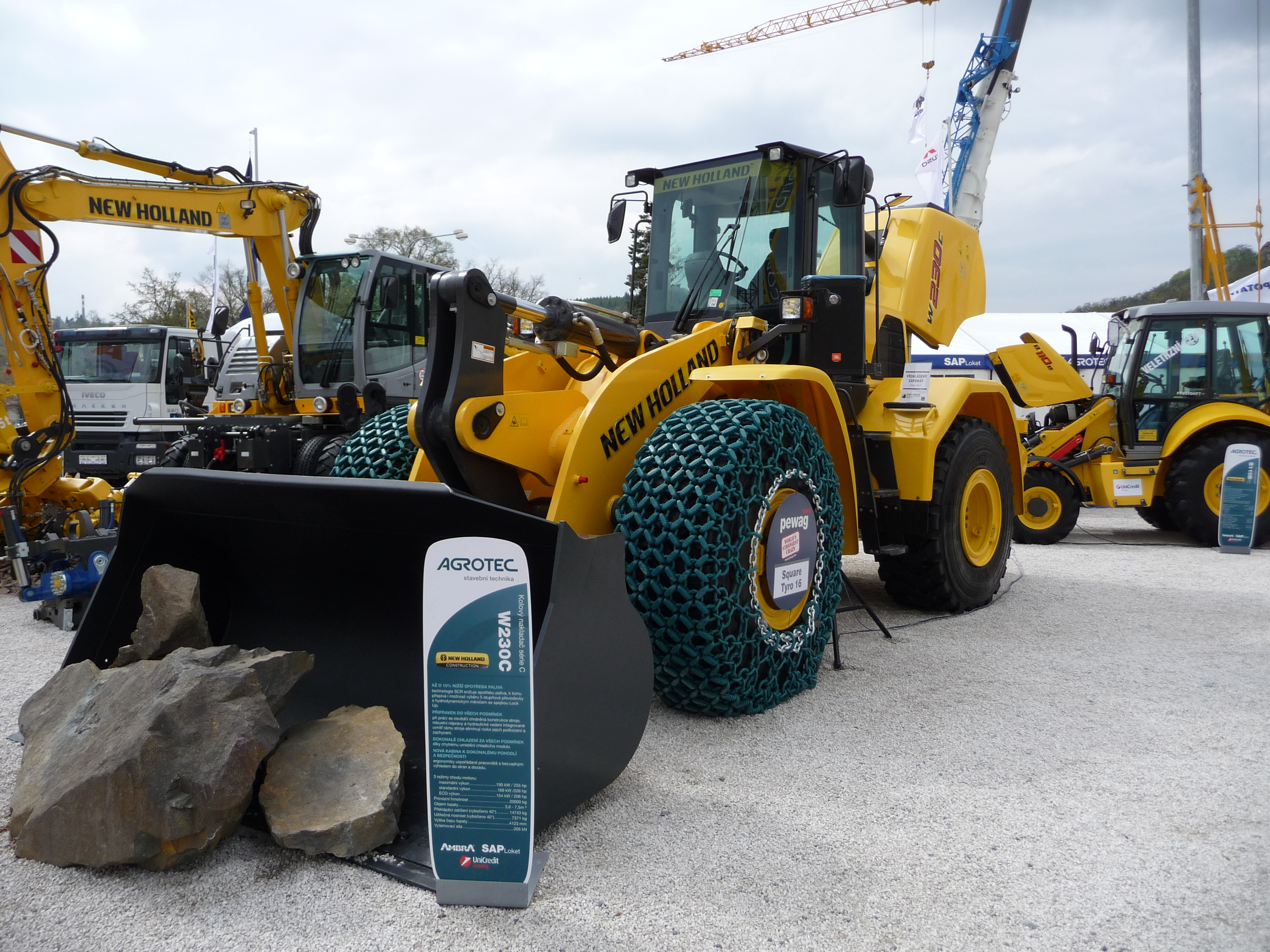
Wheel Loader New Holland W 230C.

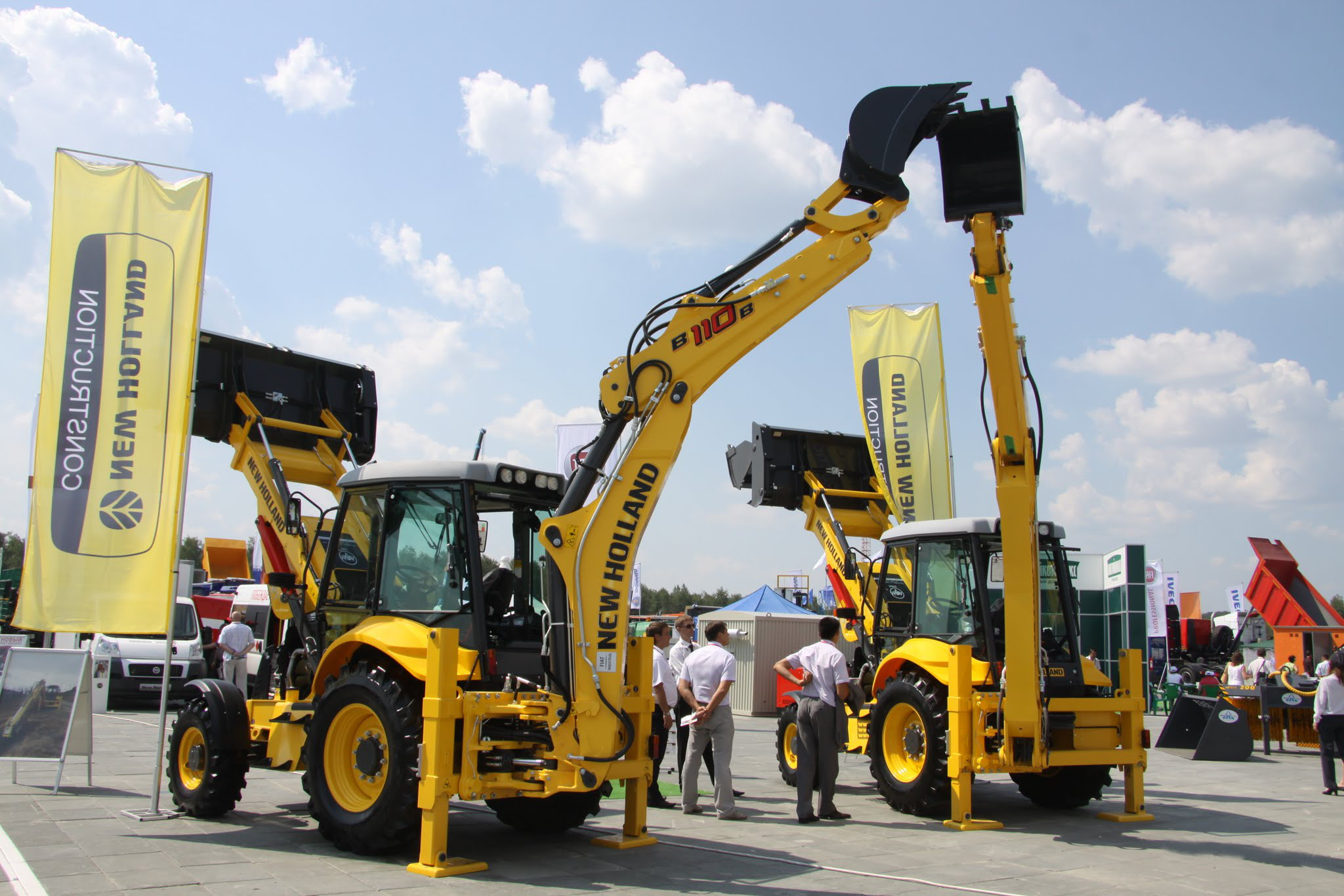
New Holland backhoe loaders B 110B.

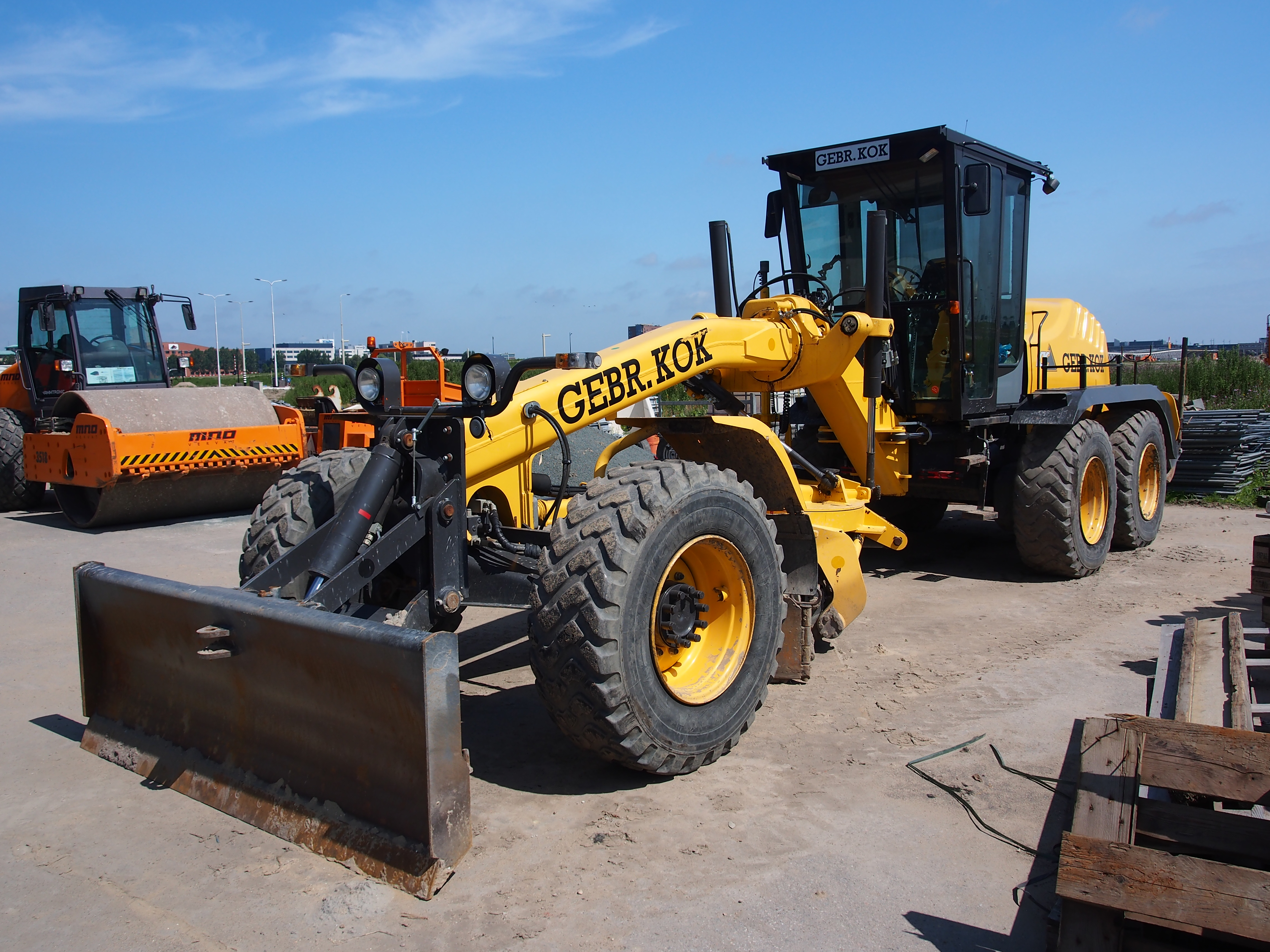
New Holland grader F 156.

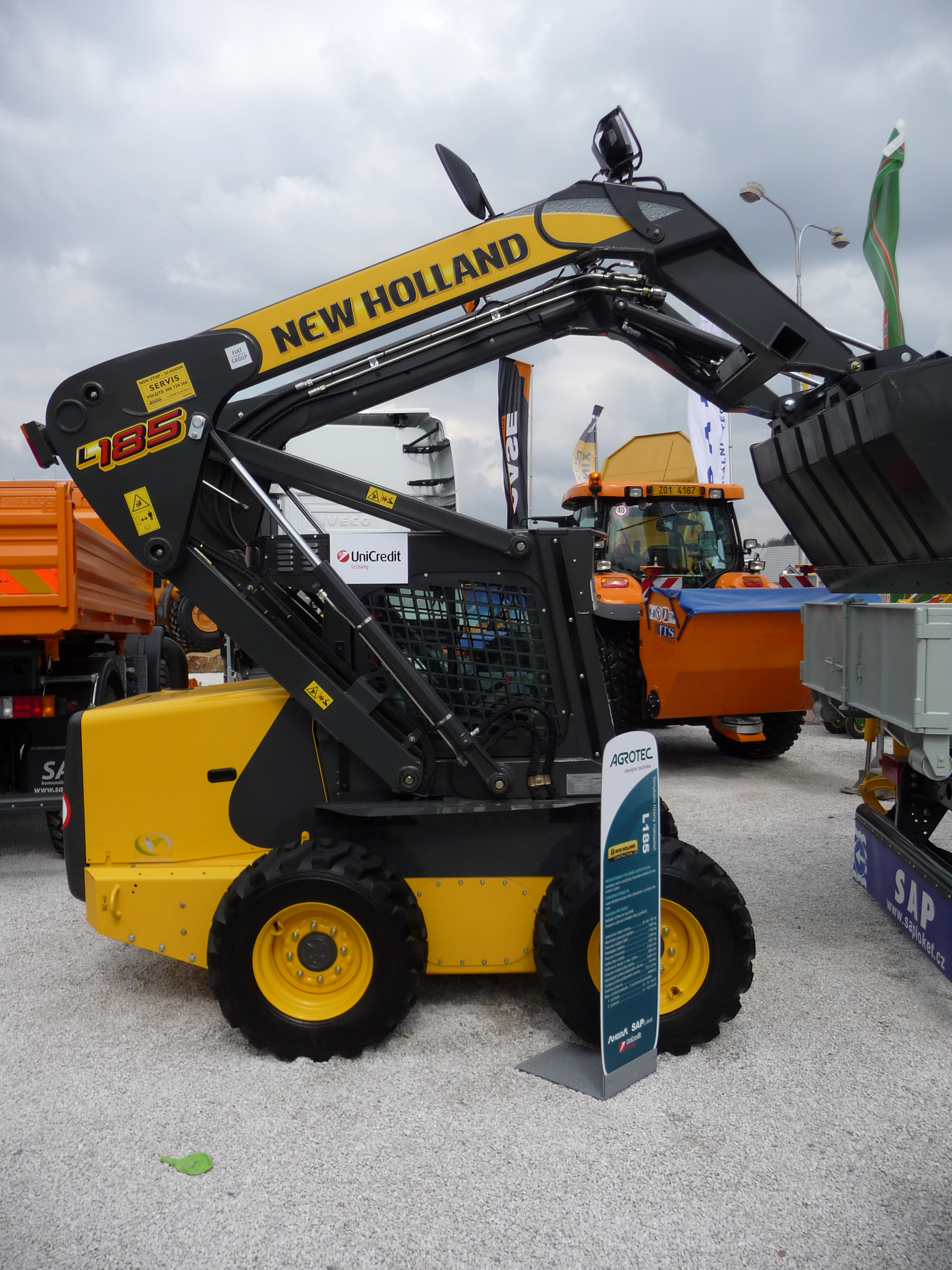

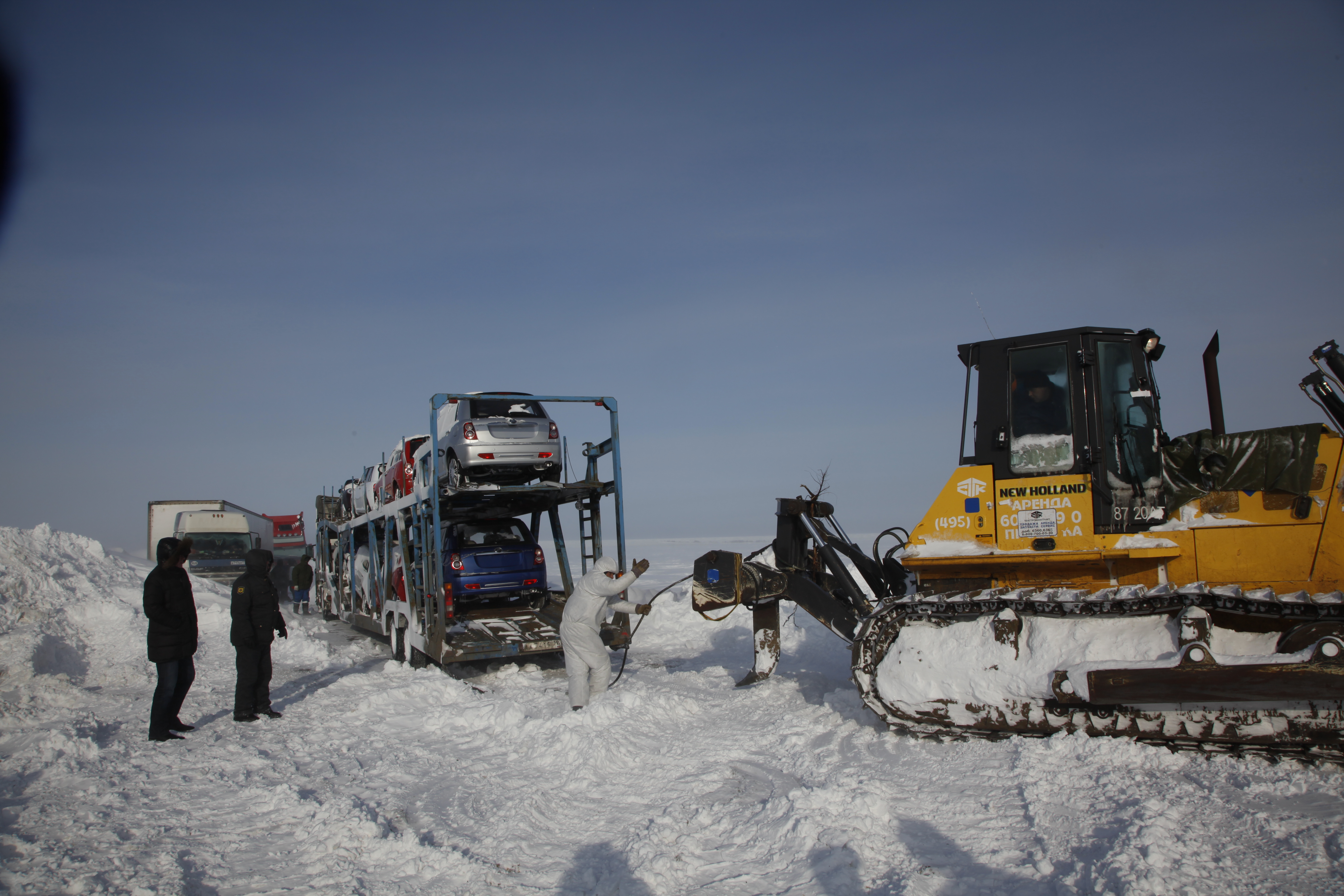
A new Holland Dozer D 350 in Russia

== Marketing ==
From 2007 to 2010, the brand was the shirt sponsor for Juventus FC

== See also ==
- New Holland Agriculture
