= Steyr Tractor =

Austrian tractor manufacturer

Steyr Landmaschinentechnik AG
- Industry: Agricultural machinery
- Predecessor: Steyr-Daimler-Puch
- Founded: 1864
- Headquarters: St. Valentin, Lower Austria, Austria
- Products: Tractors
- Parent: CNH Industrial
- Website: www.steyr-traktoren.com

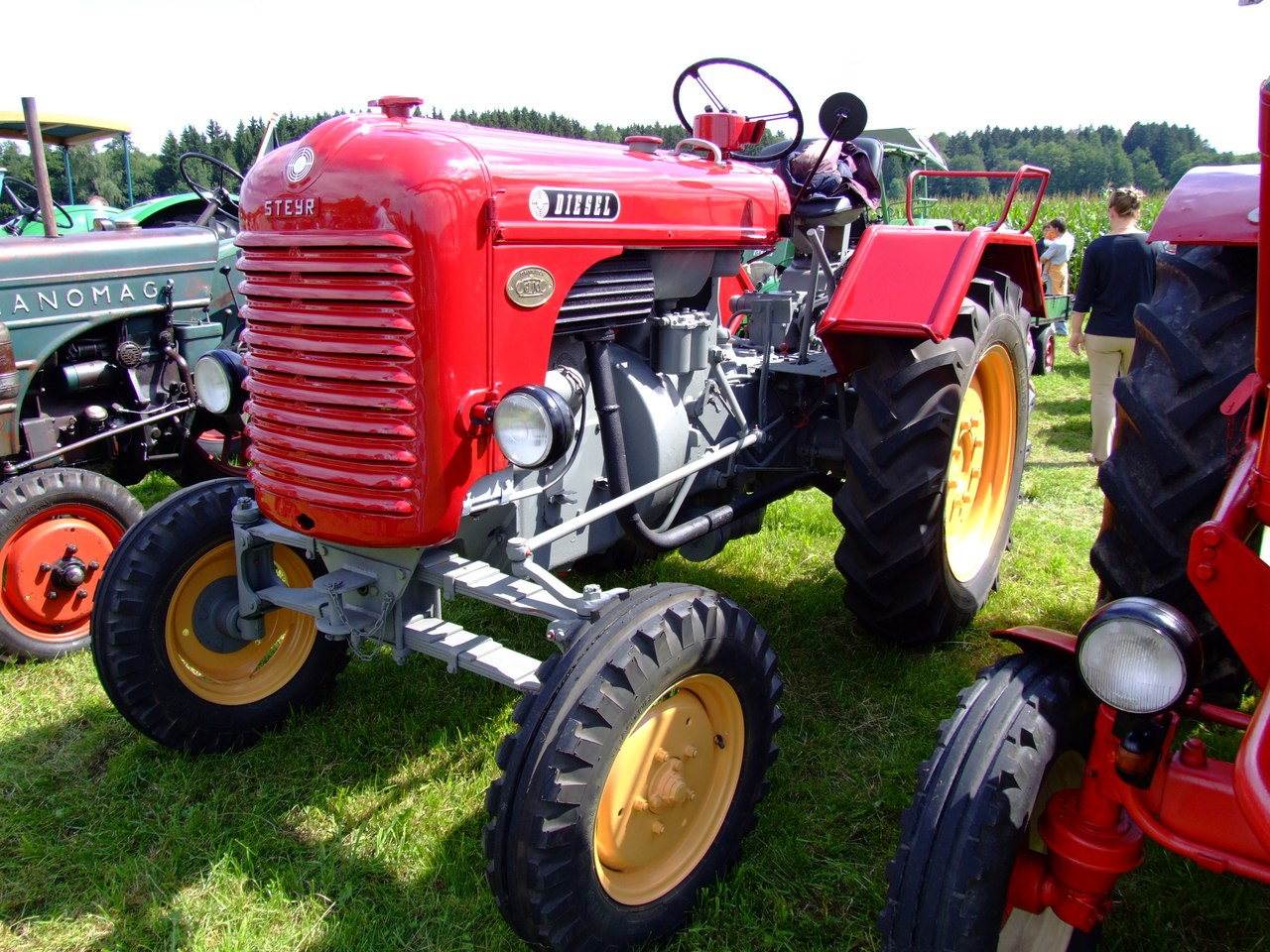
1956 Steyr 36PS

Steyr Tractor (properly called Steyr Landmaschinentechnik AG) is an Austrian agricultural machinery manufacturer. The company was founded in 1864 in St. Valentin, Austria, and manufactures tractors. It was part of the Steyr-Daimler-Puch conglomerate from 1934 until 1990 and was purchased by Case Corporation in 1996. Case IH and New Holland merged in 1999 to form CNH Global, which in turn merged with Fiat Industrial in 2012 to form CNH Industrial.

In 2020, the factory in St. Valentin had 600 employees, and produced around 10,000 tractors per year, both Case IH and Steyr. The tractors between 75 and 220 KW have engines from Fiat Powertrain Technologies.

== See also ==
- Steyr-Daimler-Puch
- Austro-Daimler
