= CNH Industrial =

European multinational corporation

CNH Industrial N.V.
- Type: Public
- Traded as: NYSE: CNH; S&P 400 component
- ISIN: NL0010545661
- Industry: Agricultural machinery; Heavy equipment
- Predecessors: CNH Global; Fiat Industrial
- Founded: 2012; 14 years ago
- Headquarters: Basildon, United Kingdom,
- Area served: Worldwide
- Key people: Suzanne Heywood (chair); Gerrit Marx (CEO); Oddone Incisa (CFO); Parag Garg (CDO)
- Products: Tractors; Combines; Forage equipment; Hay tools; Seeding; Tillage equipment; Harvesters; Construction Equipment
- Brands: Case IH; New Holland Agriculture; Steyr Tractor; Case Construction Equipment; New Holland Construction
- Revenue: ▼US$19.8 billion (2024)
- Operating income: ▼US$3.73 billion (2024)
- Net income: ▼US$1.25 billion (2024)
- Total assets: ▼US$42.9 billion (2024)
- Total equity: ▼US$7.71 billion (2024)
- Owner: Exor (26.89% equity; 45.10% voting rights)
- Number of employees: 35,850 (2024)
- Website: cnh.com

CNH Industrial NV is an American-British multinational corporation with global headquarters in Basildon, United Kingdom, but controlled and mostly owned by the Dutch investment company Exor, which in turn is controlled by the Agnelli family. Through its various businesses, CNH Industrial designs, produces, and sells agricultural machinery and construction equipment (Case IH and New Holland brand families). Present in all major markets worldwide, CNH Industrial is focused on expanding its presence in high-growth markets, including through joint ventures. In 2019 CNH Industrial employed more than 63,000 people in 67 manufacturing plants and 56 research and development centers. The company operates across 180 countries.

CNH Industrial is listed on the New York Stock Exchange. The company is incorporated in the Netherlands. The seat of the company is in Amsterdam, Netherlands, with a principal office in London, England.

== Brands ==
CNH Industrial products are marketed globally through several brands in two operating segments: agriculture and construction.

=== Agricultural brands ===
In agricultural equipment, CNH Industrial is a manufacturer of agricultural tractors and combines, including hay and forage equipment and specialty harvesting equipment.

==== Case IH ====
Case IH logo

Case IH manufactures agricultural tractors, balers, coffee harvesters, combines, cotton pickers, planters, sugar cane harvesters, and tillage equipment, sold through a global network of dealers.

==== New Holland ====
New Holland Agriculture manufactures agricultural tractors, balers, combines, forage harvesters, grape harvesters, hay tools, material handlers, planters, seeders, sprayers, tillage equipment and grounds care. New Holland has manufacturing facilities and offices in several countries and an international distribution network.

==== Steyr ====
Steyr logo

Steyr is an Austrian manufacturer of tractors for the agricultural, forestry and municipal sectors.

=== Construction brands ===
In construction equipment, CNH Industrial manufactures machinery, including backhoe loaders and skid-steer loaders in North America, and crawler excavators in Western Europe.

==== Case Construction Equipment ====
Case Construction logo

Case Construction Equipment offers construction equipment, including backhoe loaders, articulated trucks, crawler and wheeled excavators (including compact), telehandlers, motor graders, wheel loaders (including compact), vibratory compaction rollers, crawler dozers, skid steers, compact track loaders, tractor loaders and rough-terrain forklifts.

==== New Holland Construction ====
New Holland Construction manufactures construction equipment including crawler and wheeled excavators, wheel loaders, backhoes loaders, skid steer loaders, dozers, telehandlers, mini-wheel loaders compact track loaders, mini and midi excavators and graders.

=== Financial services ===
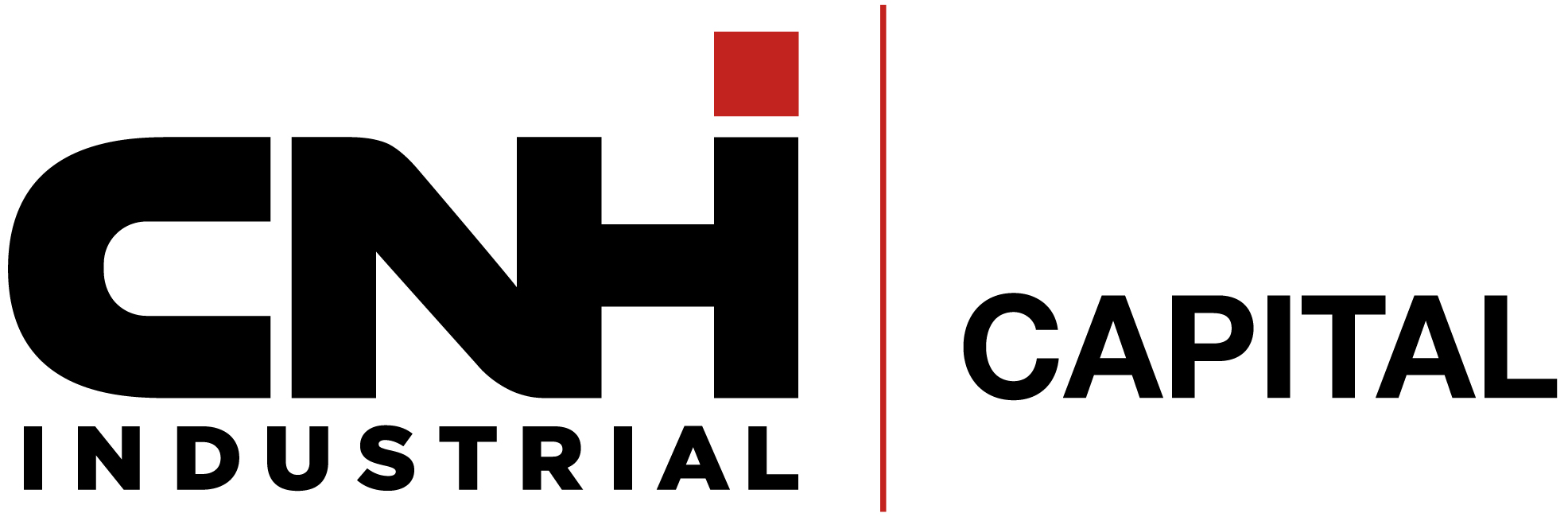
CNHI Capital logo

CNH Industrial offers financial services under the brand name CNH Industrial Capital. CNH Industrial Capital offers financial products and services to dealers and customers in North America, Australia, Brazil and Western Europe. The principal products offered are retail financing for the purchase or lease of new and used CNH Industrial equipment and wholesale financing to its dealers. Wholesale financing consists primarily of floor plan financing and allows dealers to purchase and maintain a representative inventory of products. The retail financing is offered in North America, Brazil, Australia and Europe through wholly owned subsidiaries and in Western Europe through the joint venture with BNP Paribas Lease Group.

=== Parts and service ===
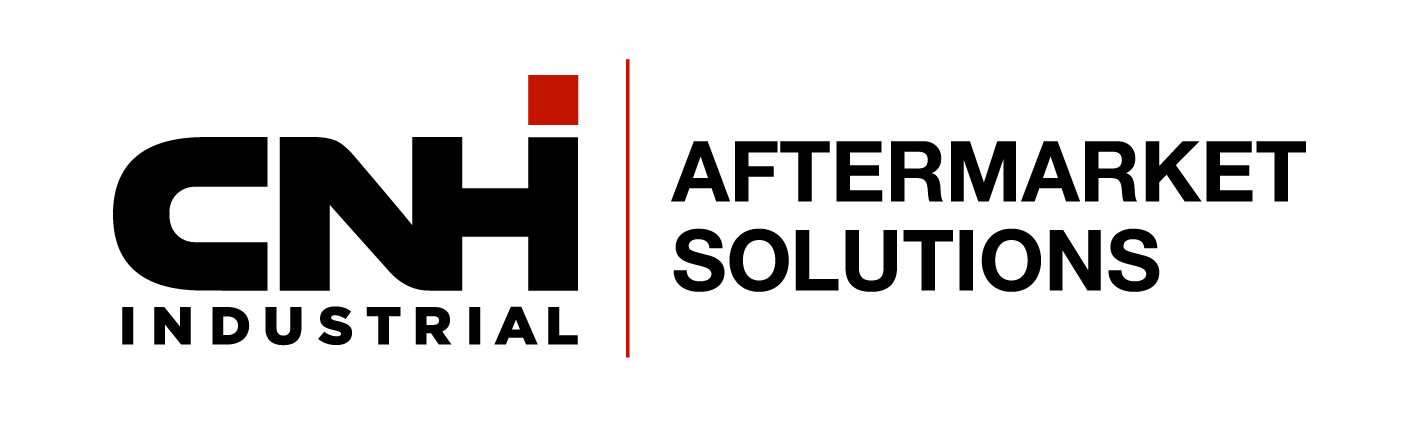
CNHI Aftermarket Solutions logo

CNH Industrial brands provides after-sales parts, service and support to their customers, both at the dealerships and in the field. Parts support is offered for items in their current product lines and past products, up to 20 years. Parts distribution is operated through parts depots present on all five continents.

== Worldwide presence and production plants ==
CNH Industrial has a network of more than 11,500 dealers and distributors spread across approximately 170 countries worldwide. Dealers are independent and not owned by CNH Industrial, with the exception of 12 dealerships in North America and Europe. CNH Industrial manufacturing base includes 37 facilities in Europe, Latin America, North America and Asia.

== History ==
=== Case Construction equipment timeline ===
1842: Case is founded
1912: Case manufactures a line of road-building equipment, including graders and compaction units
1957: Case Model 320 is launched - the first fully factory-integrated backhoe loader, designed and built as a unit rather than attachments to a farm tractor.
1969: Case CE begins production of skid steer loaders
1988: Fortune Magazine lists the Case loader/backhoe among "100 Products America Makes Best"
1998: Case is the first manufacturer to offer ride control on backhoe loaders and skid steer loaders
2000: the 100,000th skid steer loader is manufactured
2005: the 500,000th loader/backhoe is manufactured
2008: Jerome I. Case inducted into the Construction Hall of Fame by the Association of Equipment Manufacturers. Three years later, in 2011, also Case engineer Elton Long, "father of the loader/backhoe," is inducted into the same Construction Equipment Hall of Fame for significant contributions to the construction industry.
2011: Case became the first construction equipment manufacturer to offer both selective catalytic reduction and cooled exhaust gas recirculation, aimed at meeting U.S. and European emissions standards.
2012: Case celebrates its 170th year in business.

=== Case IH milestones ===
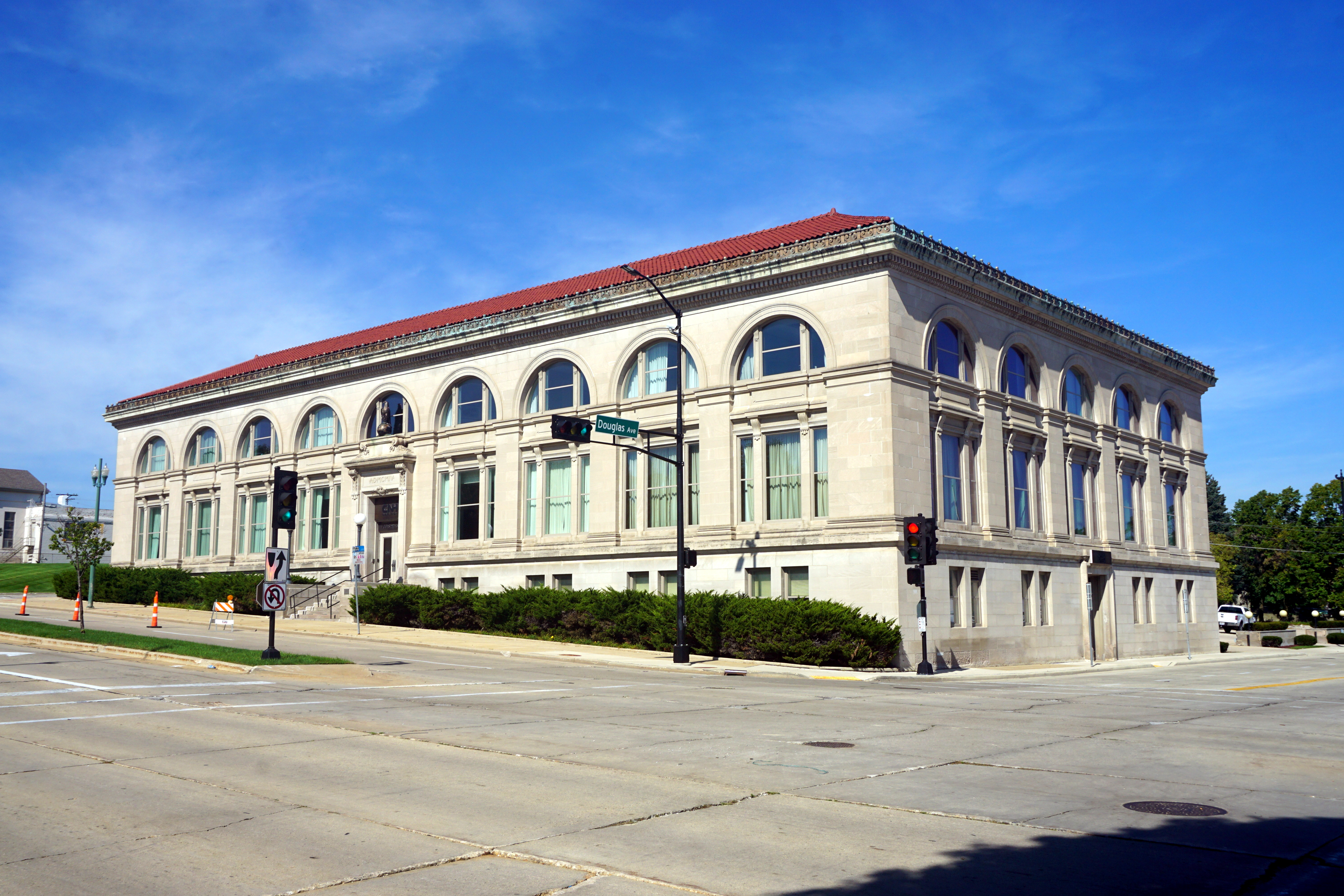
CNH International in Racine, Wisconsin

1842: J.I. Case founds Racine Threshing Machine Works
1845: Cyrus Hall McCormick Sr. patents the McCormick reaper
1902: McCormick, Deering Harvester Company, Plano Manufacturing Company, Champion Line and Milwaukee Harvester Company merge to create International Harvester (IH)
1923: Farmall, the "little red tractor", is introduced to the market
1942: Case first self-propelled combine is produced
1977: The first Axial-Flow rotary combine is produced
1985: Case and the agricultural division of International Harvester merge, creating Case IH
1987: Case IH Purchases Steiger
1988: Case IH introduces the Magnum tractor – the first new machine to come from the combined engineering of International Harvester and Case.
1996: Steiger Quadtrac tractor is introduced.
1996: Case IH enters the sugarcane harvester market after acquiring Australian manufacturer Austoft.
2006: Case IH announces new on-board module builder technology for cotton harvesting. The Case IH Module Express 625 is the first commercial cotton picker with the ability to build modules while harvesting.
2009: Case IH launches a new line of combines with six Axial-Flow models, including a Class IX 9120 model.
2010: Introduction of EfficientPower Puma, Puma CVX, Magnum and Steiger & QUADRAC models, designed for lower fuel consumption.

=== New Holland Agriculture milestones ===
1895: Abe Zimmerman produces a feed mill to help the Pennsylvania farming community
1903: New Holland Machine Company is founded by Abe Zimmerman in New Holland, Pennsylvania
1906: A Belgian mechanic, Leon Claeys, starts to build threshing machines and three years later builds his factory in Zedelgem, Belgium
1907: Ford comes out with a prototype of mass-produced tractor; the Fordson Model F is actually produced 10 years later
1919: Fiat Trattori starts production of Model 702 tractor
1939: Ford builds the world's first mass produced Ferguson System tractor, the Ford Tractor with Ferguson System. A tractor that changed agriculture forever with its built in three point hydraulic linkage. From 1925 when Harry Ferguson invented the modern tractor with his Ferguson Master Patent his goal was mass production and that would finally be achieved thanks to the Gentleman's agreement with Henry Ford. Every tractor today can trace its ancestry back to this little grey tractor.
1964: New Holland buys a major interest in Claeys
1975: Braud launches the first grape harvester, model 1020
1980s: Fiat acquires Braud
1986: Ford buys New Holland and forms Ford-New Holland Inc.
1991: Fiat purchases 80 percent of Ford-New Holland and New Holland brand becomes a global full liner producer
2001: New Holland introduces the CX combine series
2006: New Holland celebrates 100 years of its Zedelgem plant
2007: New Holland sponsors Turin's Juventus Football Club
2009: New Holland introduces its Hydrogen-powered tractor NH2 and the Energy Independent Farm concept
2011: New Holland is a Gold Sponsor of the Climate Action Networking Reception, hosted by Climate Action in partnership with the United Nations Environment Programme (UNEP) and the South African government in Durban.
2012: New Holland celebrates 200,000th tractor made at its Indian plant at its manufacturing facility in Greater Noida, near New Delhi.

=== New Holland Construction milestones ===
1931: Fiat Trattori builds the first tractor with crawler tracks
1947: First hydraulic excavators are built in Turin by Bruneri, which will join the company in 1970
1966: Ford builds its first backhoe loader
1972: First New Holland skid-steer loader is produced
1974: Fiat and Allis-Chalmers merge, creating FiatAllis
1991: Fiat purchases 80 percent of Ford-New Holland
2002: A global alliance with Kobelco is signed to bring Kobelco's 40-year expertise in crawler excavator design
2005: New Holland Construction is launched as a brand
2007: New Holland Construction produces the 200,000th skid steer loader, 35 years after its first one came off the line
2008: New Holland Construction launches the E215B crawler excavator with a new engine designed for lower emissions
2011: New Holland announces its Tier 4 interim diesel-emissions solutions and launches the first compliant models.

=== CNH Global ===
CNH Global N.V.
- Industry: Agricultural machinery Heavy equipment Capital lending
- Predecessor: Case Corporation; New Holland Agriculture
- Founded: 1999
- Defunct: 2013
- Fate: Merger
- Successor: CNH Industrial
- Headquarters: Amsterdam, Netherlands
- Revenue: 23,551,000,000 United States dollar (2022)
- Operating income: 638,000,000 United States dollar (2016)
- Net income: 2,029,000,000 United States dollar (2022)
- Total assets: 47,384,000,000 United States dollar (2016)
- Number of employees: 62,828 (2016)
- Parent: CNH Industrial

CNH Global NV was the holding company for the multinational manufacturer of agricultural and construction equipment established on 12 November 1999, through the merger of Case and New Holland. Effective 29 September 2013, CNH Global N.V. and Fiat Industrial S.p.A. were merged into CNH Industrial N.V.

CNH's scope included integrated engineering, manufacturing, marketing and distribution of equipment on five continents. CNH's operations were organized into three business segments: agricultural equipment, construction equipment and financial services.

As of 31 December 2012, CNH manufactured its products in 37 facilities throughout the world and distributes its products in approximately 170 countries through approximately 11,500 full line dealers and distributors.

Milestones include:

1999: CNH was created in November through the business merger of Case Corporation and New Holland N.V.
2000: CNH Global acquires all of the shares of Flexi-Coil Ltd., a Canadian agricultural equipment manufacturer based in Saskatoon, Saskatchewan. Paolo Monferino is appointed President & Chief Executive Officer of CNH Global N.V.
2001: CNH Global, Kobe Steel Ltd., and Kobelco Construction Machinery reach an agreement to form a global alliance for the marketing, development and production of crawler excavators worldwide. The alliance with Kobelco includes also distribution of CNH construction equipment in Japan and the Asia Pacific region.
2002: CNH Global entered its second joint venture in China. Shanghai New Holland Agricultural Machinery Corp. Ltd. was formed by an agreement between Shanghai Tractor, Internal Combustion Engine Corp.and CNH's New Holland brand of agricultural equipment. CNH Global N.V. creates Fiat Kobelco Construction Machinery S.p.A. (Fiat Kobelco) and agrees to a long term retail financing partnership across Europe with BNP Paribas Lease Group (BPLG), the leasing arm of BNP Paribas
2005: In Europe and Latin America, CNH rationalizes non-Case construction equipment brand families into one brand, New Holland Construction. CNH Board elects Harold Boyanovsky as President & Chief Executive Officer of CNH Global N.V.
2006: Sergio Marchionne is appointed Chairman of the Board of CNH Global N.V.
2007: Case Construction Equipment and Hyundai Heavy Industries form a strategic alliance to produce a selected wheel loader size.
2010: Fiat announces that CNH, Iveco and Fist Powertrain Industrial & Marine will be separated from the auto business and listed in Milan stock exchange as Fiat Industrial CNH and KAMAZ finalize strategic alliance for the production and commercialization of agricultural and construction machinery in Russia.
2011: CNH becomes part of Fiat Industrial S.p.A. on 1 January.
2012: Richard Tobin is named President and CEO of CNH Global N.V.

=== Fiat Industrial ===
Fiat Industrial S.p.A.
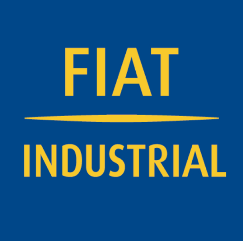
- Type: Società per azioni
- Industry: Heavy equipment
- Founded: July 2010; 16 years ago (incorporated)
- Defunct: September 29, 2013
- Fate: Merger
- Successor: CNH Industrial
- Headquarters: Turin, Italy
- Key people: Sergio Marchionne (Chairman)
- Products: Trucks, construction and agricultural machinery, industrial and marine powertrains
- Revenue: ▲€25.8 billion (2012)
- Operating income: ▲€2.1 billion (2012)
- Net income: ▲€921 million (2012)
- Total assets: 47,384,000,000 United States dollar (2016)
- Number of employees: 68,257 (end 2012)
- Subsidiaries: CNH Global (87.4%), Iveco, FPT Industrial

Fiat Industrial S.p.A. was an Italian company into which Fiat S.p.A. (parent company of Fiat Group) demerged most of its activities not directly related to automobiles at the start of 2011. Fiat Industrial served as a holding company for the activities of truck manufacturer Iveco; an 89.3% stake in the agricultural and construction equipment producer CNH Global; and FPT Industrial, which consists of the industrial and marine activities formerly part of Fiat Powertrain Technologies. The company's Chairman was Sergio Marchionne, who also served as CEO of Fiat S.p.A. and Chairman/CEO of Chrysler Group LLC, now merged as Fiat Chrysler Automobiles.

On 1 January 2011, each existing share of Fiat S.p.A. was converted into one Fiat share and one Fiat Industrial share. This resulted in Exor (the holding company controlled by the Agnelli family), the largest shareholder of Fiat with a stake of around 30%, holding an equivalent stake in Fiat Industrial. Exor has however raised the possibility of the future sale of some of its stake.

In September 2011, the company entered the DJSI World and Europe indexes as leader in the Industrial Engineering sector.

On 29 September 2013, CNH Global N.V. and Fiat Industrial S.p.A. were merged into CNH Industrial N.V., a company incorporated in the Netherlands. Fiat Industrial shareholders received one CNH Industrial common share for every Fiat Industrial share held and CNH Global shareholders received 3.828 CNH Industrial common shares for every CNH Global common share held. CNH Industrial N.V. was subsequently listed on both the NYSE and the Milan stock exchange (Mercato Telematico Azionario. For additional information, see CNH Industrial N.V.

=== CNH Industrial ===
2013: CNH merges with parent company Fiat Industrial S.p.A., forming the new CNH Industrial N.V., on 30 September.
2014: the company entered into a new licensing agreement with Sumitomo (S.H.I.) Construction Machinery and completed acquisition of Miller-St. Nazianz, Inc.
2016: CNH Industrial acquired Kongskilde Agriculture and entered exclusive mini-excavator alliance with Hyundai Heavy Industries.

== Brands ==
- Case Construction
- Case IH
- New Holland Agriculture
- New Holland Construction
- Steyr
- Miller
- Raven
- Hemisphere
- Flexi-Coil
- Eurocomach
