= Gerrit Marx =

German manager and CEO

Gerrit Andreas Marx
- Born: September 1975 (age 50–51); Germany
- Education: RWTH Aachen University, University of Cologne
- Occupation: Business executive
- Known for: Former CEO of Iveco

Gerrit Marx is a German business executive. After the spin-off of Iveco from CNH Industrial on 1 January 2022, Marx was made the chief executive officer of the newly formed Iveco Group. On 1 July 2024, Marx left Iveco Group and took over the role of CEO of CNH Industrial.

== Early life and education ==
Gerrit Marx was born in Germany in 1975 and obtained a degree in Mechanical Engineering (“Diplom Ingenieur”) and an MBA (“Diplom Kaufmann”) from RWTH Aachen University. He obtained a Doctorate in Business Administration from Cologne University.

== Career ==
From 1999 to 2007, Marx worked at McKinsey & Company on improvement programs for automotive and aerospace in Europe, Brazil, and Japan.

He joined Daimler AG in 2007 to head the global controlling function for vehicle and powertrain component projects, as well as market-entry/M&A in North America, Europe and Asia. He was then presidentee and CEO at Daimler Trucks China in 2009 and, subsequently, president of Skoda China at Volkswagen AG.

In 2012, Gerrit Marx joined the European leadership team of Bain Capital as a member of their portfolio group. During his tenure at Bain, he was interim CEO of Wittur Group.

Marx joined CNH Industrial in 2019 as president of commercial and specialty vehicles.

Since January 1, 2022, Marx has been chief executive officer of Iveco Group.

In April 2024 Marx was appointed CEO of CNH Industrial NV, replacing Scott Wine.
