= Backhoe loader =

Heavy equipment vehicle

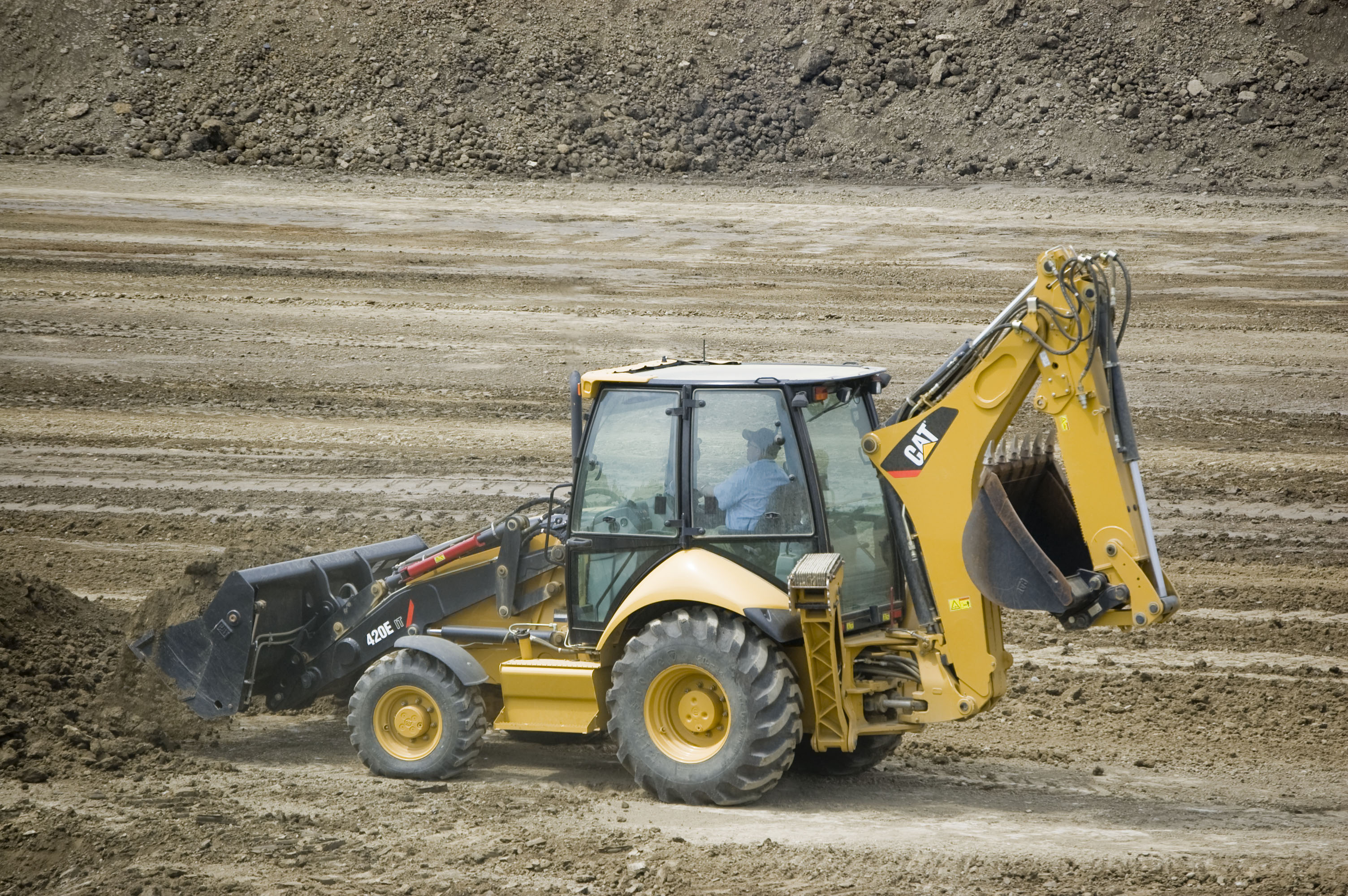
Backhoe loader Cat 420E

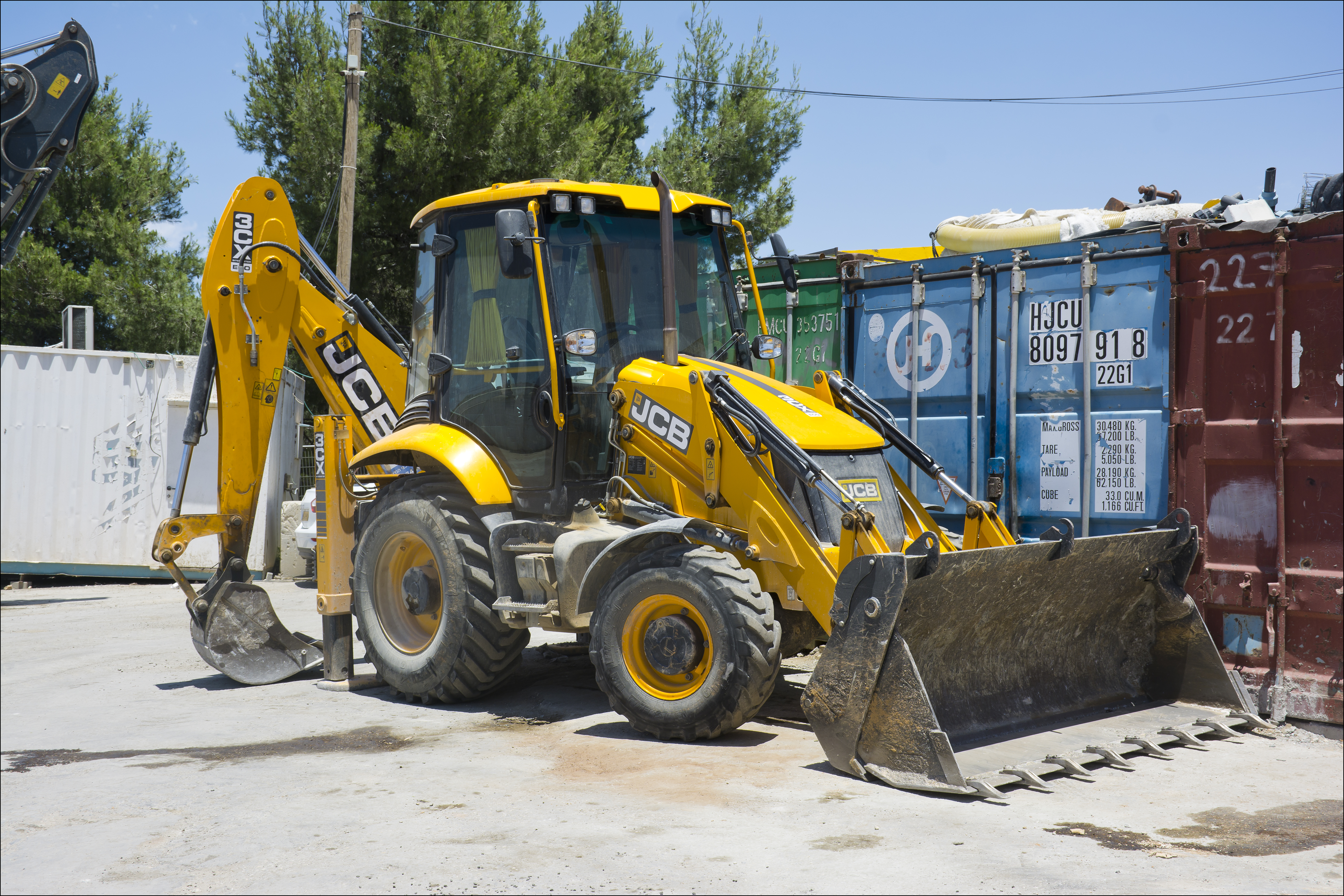
A JCB 3CX backhoe loader

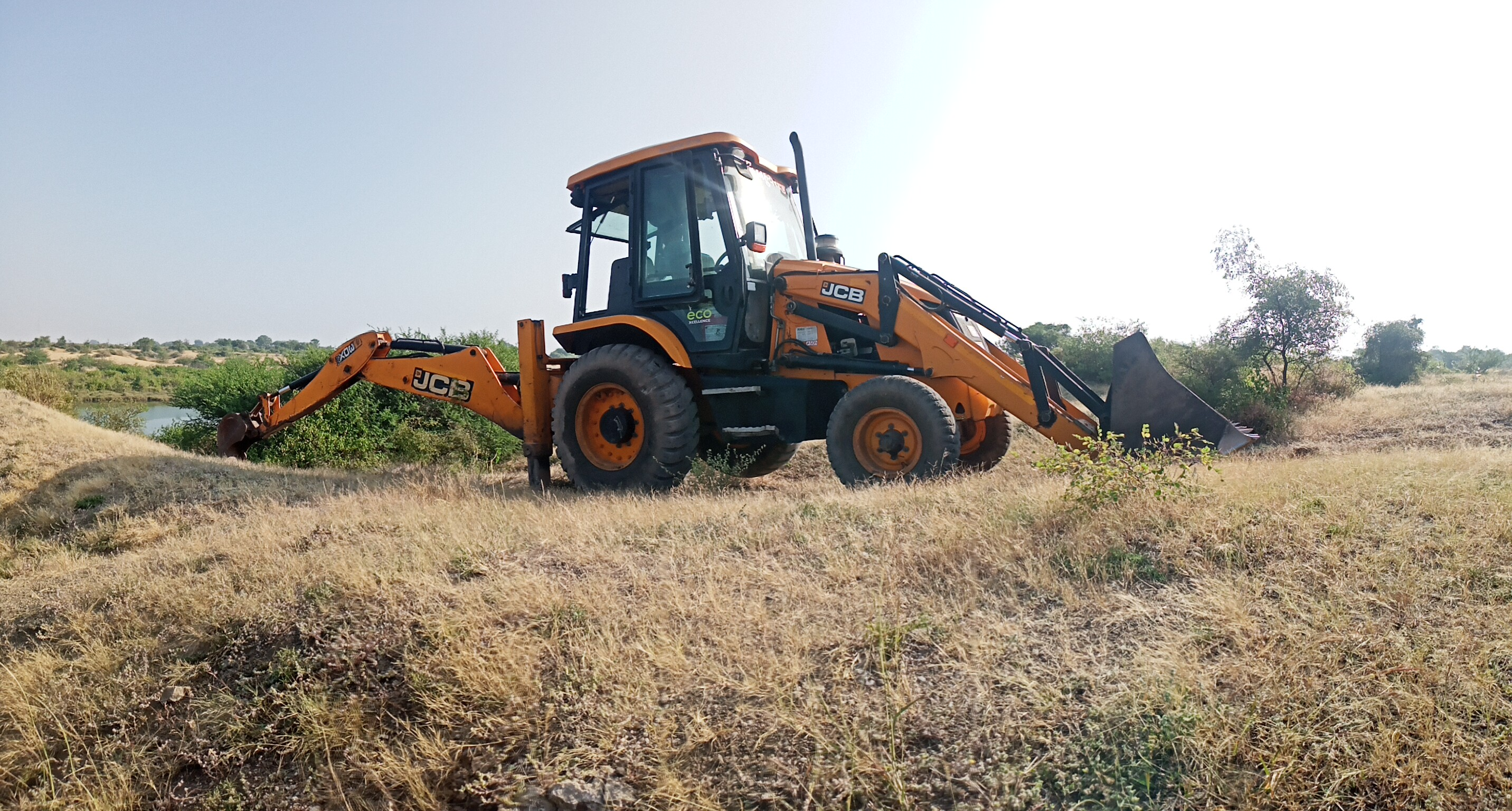
A JCB backhoe loader performing work in India

A backhoe loader, also called a loader backhoe, loader excavator, tractor excavator, digger or colloquially shortened to backhoe within the industry, is a heavy equipment vehicle that consists of a tractor-like unit fitted with a loader-style shovel/bucket on the front and a backhoe on the back. Due to its (relatively) small size and versatility, backhoe loaders are very common in urban engineering and small construction projects (such as building a small house, fixing urban roads, etc.) as well as developing countries. This type of machine is similar to and derived from what is now known as a TLB (tractor-loader-backhoe), an agricultural tractor fitted with a front loader and rear backhoe attachment.

The true development of the backhoe actually began in 1947 by the inventors that started the Wain-Roy Corporation of Hubbardston, Massachusetts. In 1947 Wain-Roy Corporation developed and tested the first actual backhoes. In April 1948 Wain-Roy Corporation sold the first all-hydraulic backhoes, mounted to a Ford Model 8N tractor, to the Connecticut Light and Power Company for $705.

== History ==
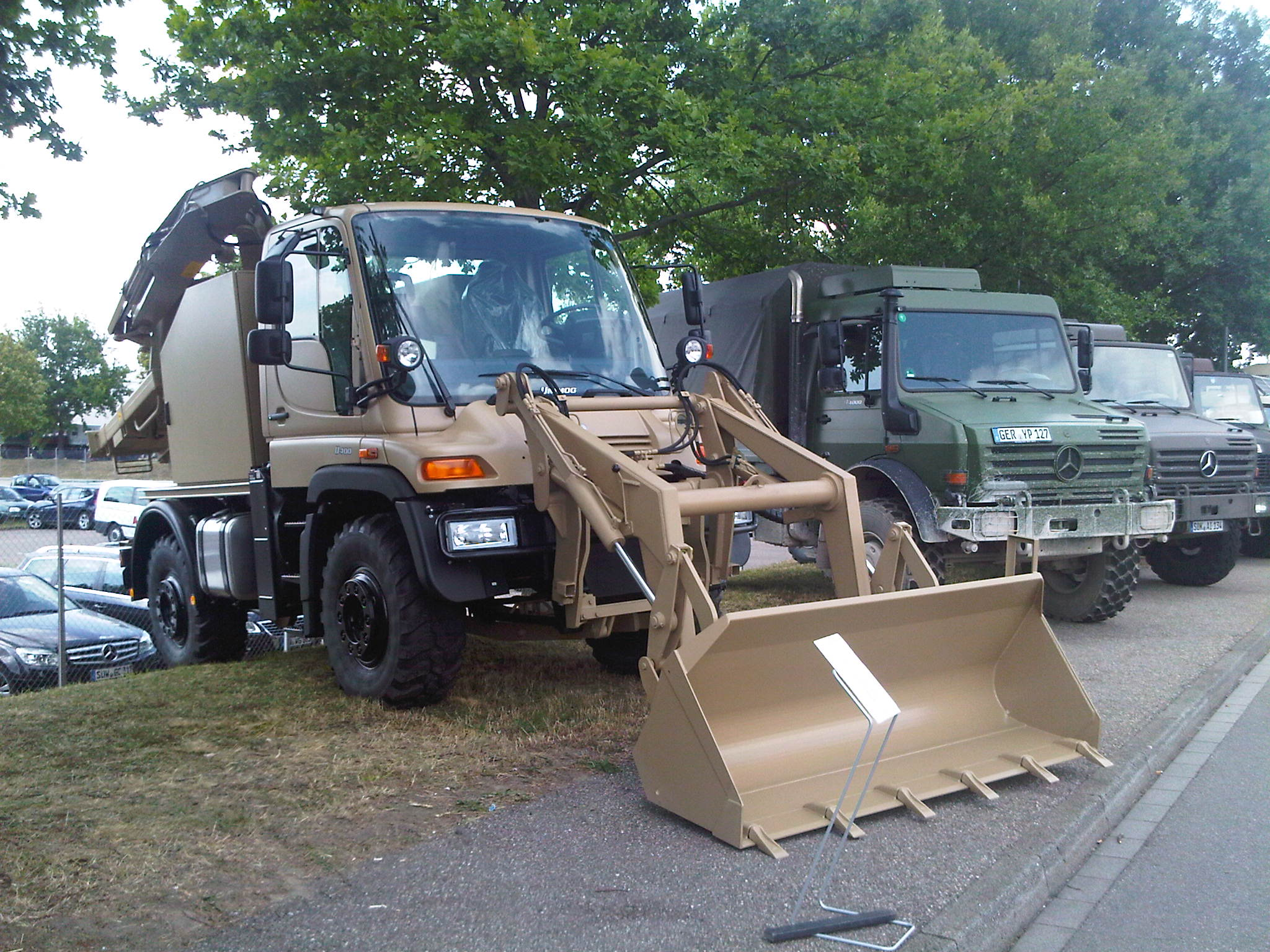
Modern Unimog as a backhoe loader

Evolving in parallel to development in the U.S., backhoes were first produced in the UK in 1953 by JCB, but it was just a prototype. The world's first backhoe loader with factory warranty was introduced in the U.S. by J.I. Case in 1957. Their Model 320 was the world's first serial backhoe loader. Although based on a tractor, a backhoe loader was and is almost never called a tractor when both the loader and the backhoe are permanently attached. Backhoe loaders are also not generally used for towing and usually do not have a power take-off (PTO) as often this is used to drive the hydraulic pump operating the attachments. When the backhoe is permanently attached, the machine usually has a seat that can swivel to the rear to face the hoe controls. Removable backhoe attachments almost always have a separate seat on the attachment itself.

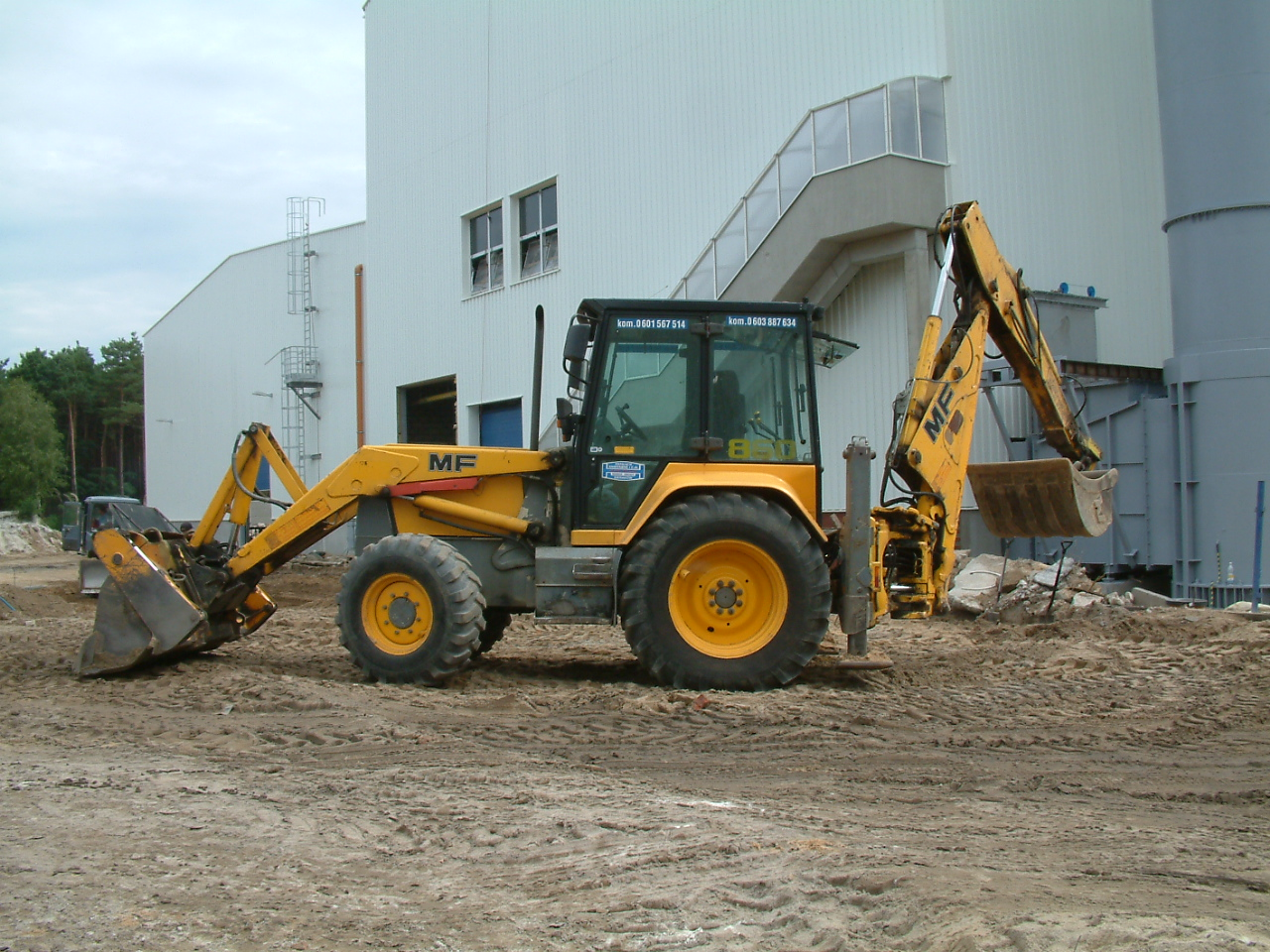
A typical European backhoe-loader; these usually have a side-shift backhoe mount and vertical stabilizers.

In Britain and Ireland they are commonly referred to simply as JCBs; they are popularly called "JCB" in India. In the United States, they are often referred to as "backhoes", although the term 'backhoe' only refers to one component.

In 1970, Hy-Dynamic, now a division of Bucyrus-Erie, manufacturer of the Dynahoe, was the first company to incorporate a four-wheel drive system into their backhoe loaders, allowing these models to go over almost any terrain with little difficulty. Since the backhoe was invented, several companies such as Caterpillar and John Deere have changed the backhoe's back arm to be slightly curved like that of an excavator, which can allow more maneuverability.

== Use ==
Backhoe loaders are very common and can be used for a wide variety of tasks: construction, small demolitions, light transportation of building materials, powering building equipment, digging holes/excavation, landscaping, breaking asphalt, and paving roads. Often, the backhoe bucket can also be replaced with powered attachments such as a breaker, grapple, auger, or a stump grinder. Enhanced articulation of attachments can be achieved with intermediate attachments such as the tiltrotator. Many backhoes feature quick coupler (quick-attach) mounting systems and auxiliary hydraulic circuits for simplified attachment mounting, increasing the machine's utilization on the job site. Some loader buckets have a retractable bottom or "clamshell", enabling it to empty its load more quickly and efficiently. Retractable-bottom loader buckets are also often used for grading and scraping. The front assembly may be a removable attachment or permanently mounted.

Because digging while on tires intrinsically causes the machine to rock, and the swinging weight of the backhoe could cause the vehicle to tip, most backhoe loaders use hydraulic outriggers or stabilizers at the rear when digging and lower the loader bucket for additional stability. This means that the bucket must be raised and the outriggers retracted when the vehicle needs to change positions, reducing efficiency. For this reason many companies offer miniature tracked excavators, which sacrifice the loader function and ability to be driven from site to site, for increased digging efficiency.

Their relatively small frame and precise control make backhoe-loaders very useful and common in urban engineering projects such as construction and repairs in areas too small for larger equipment. Their versatility and compact size makes them one of the most popular urban construction vehicles. For larger projects, a tracked excavator is generally used.

In recent years, small compact tractors have become very popular with private homeowners. Subcompact tractors, the size between a compact tractor and lawn tractor, are also often sold in backhoe loader setup, sometimes with a belly-mounted mower also included. These tractors offer private homeowners the ability to perform minor excavation projects.

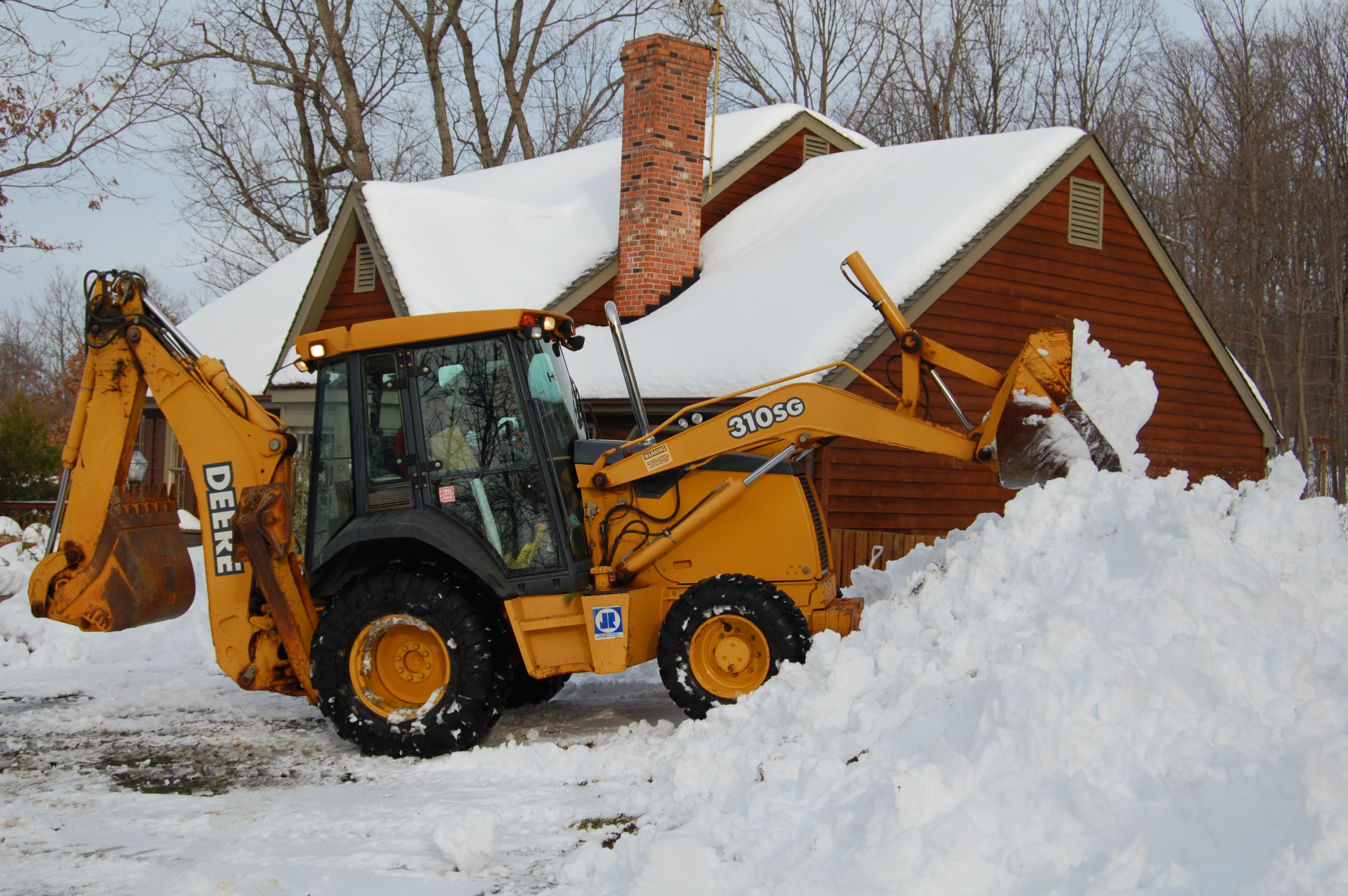
A backhoe with a snow plow attachment clearing snow

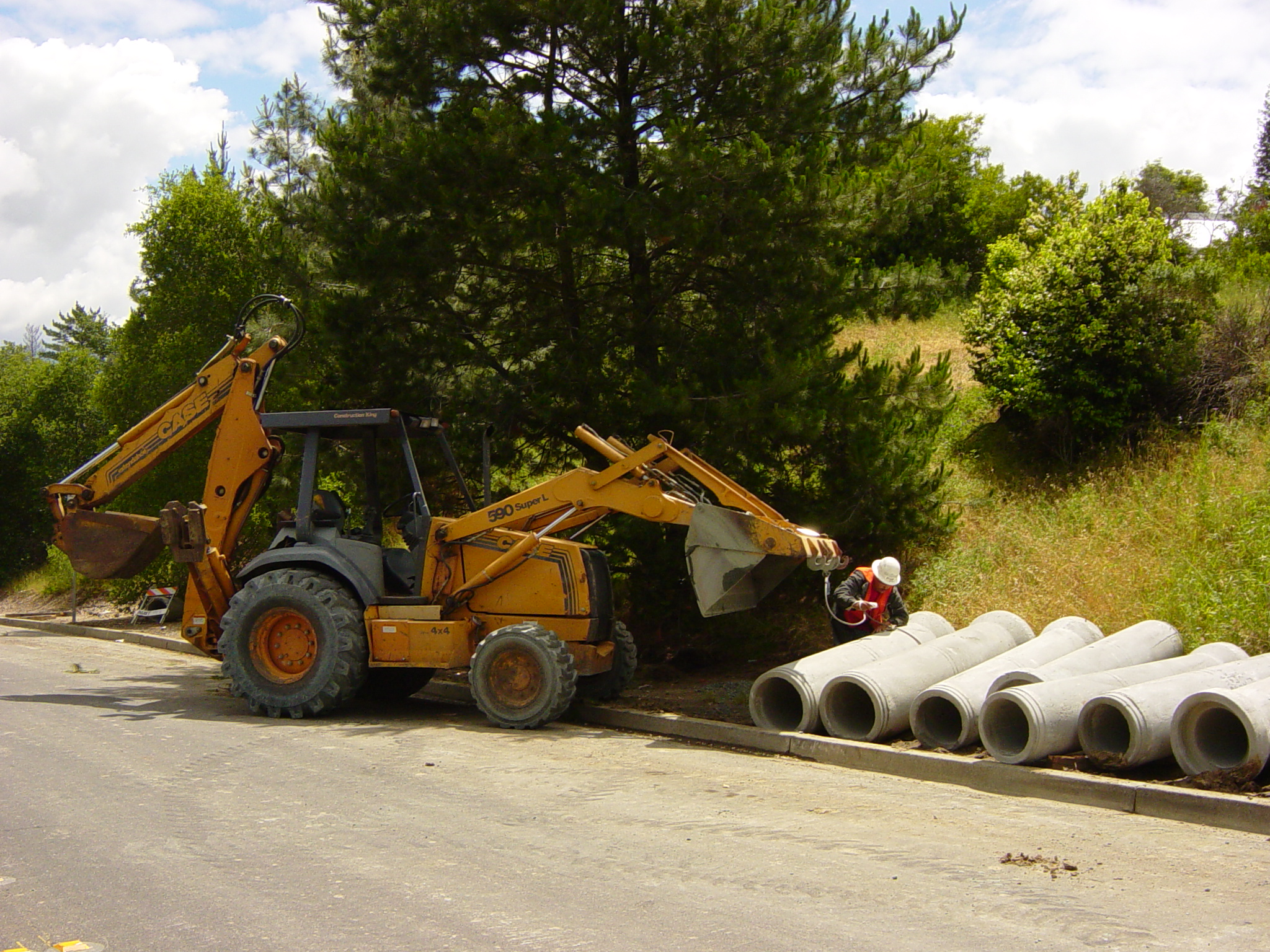
A worker attaches a lifting cable to a concrete sewer pipe section. Note the retracted stabilizers on this Case backhoe.

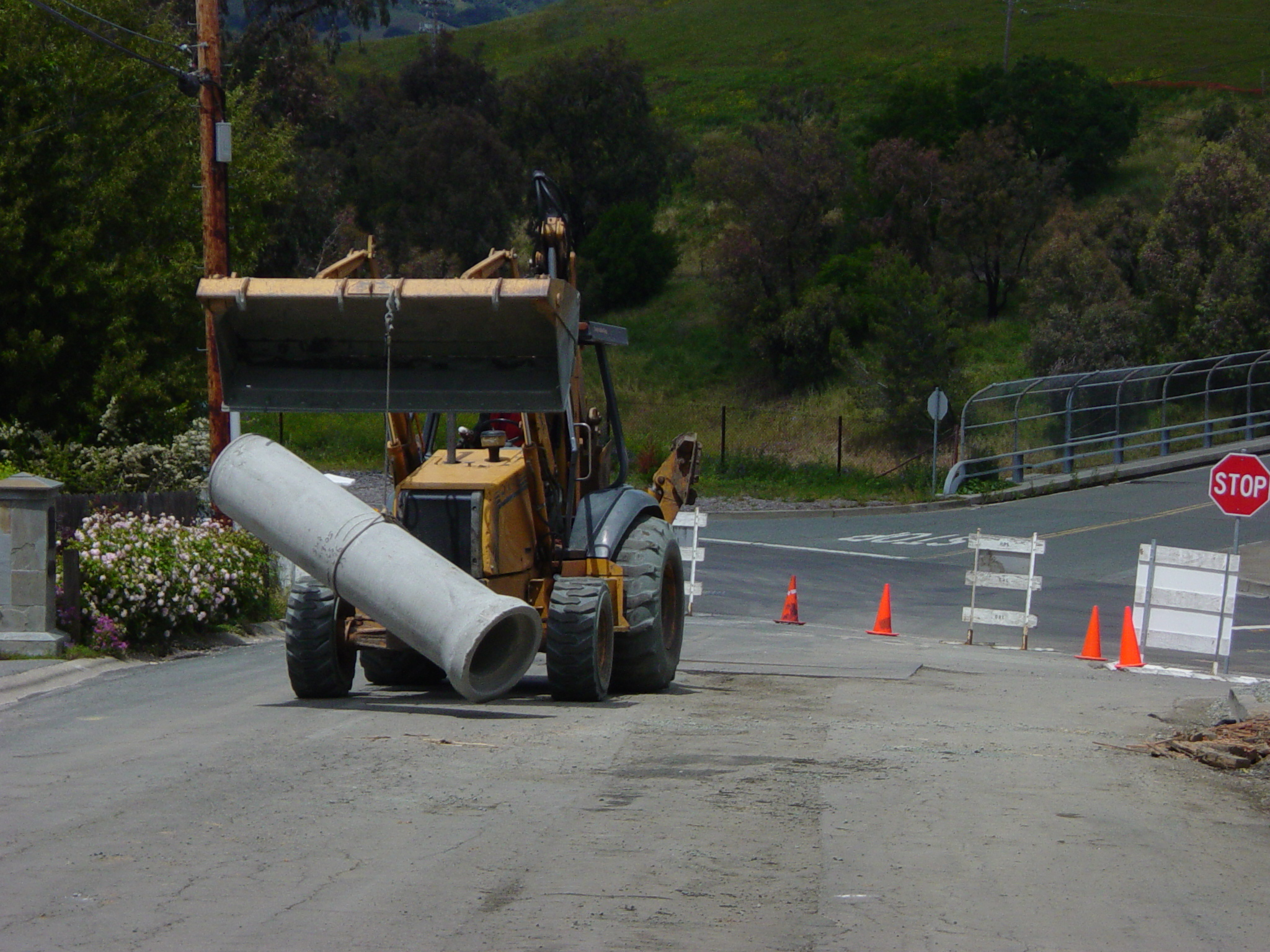
Pipe transported using a lifting cable

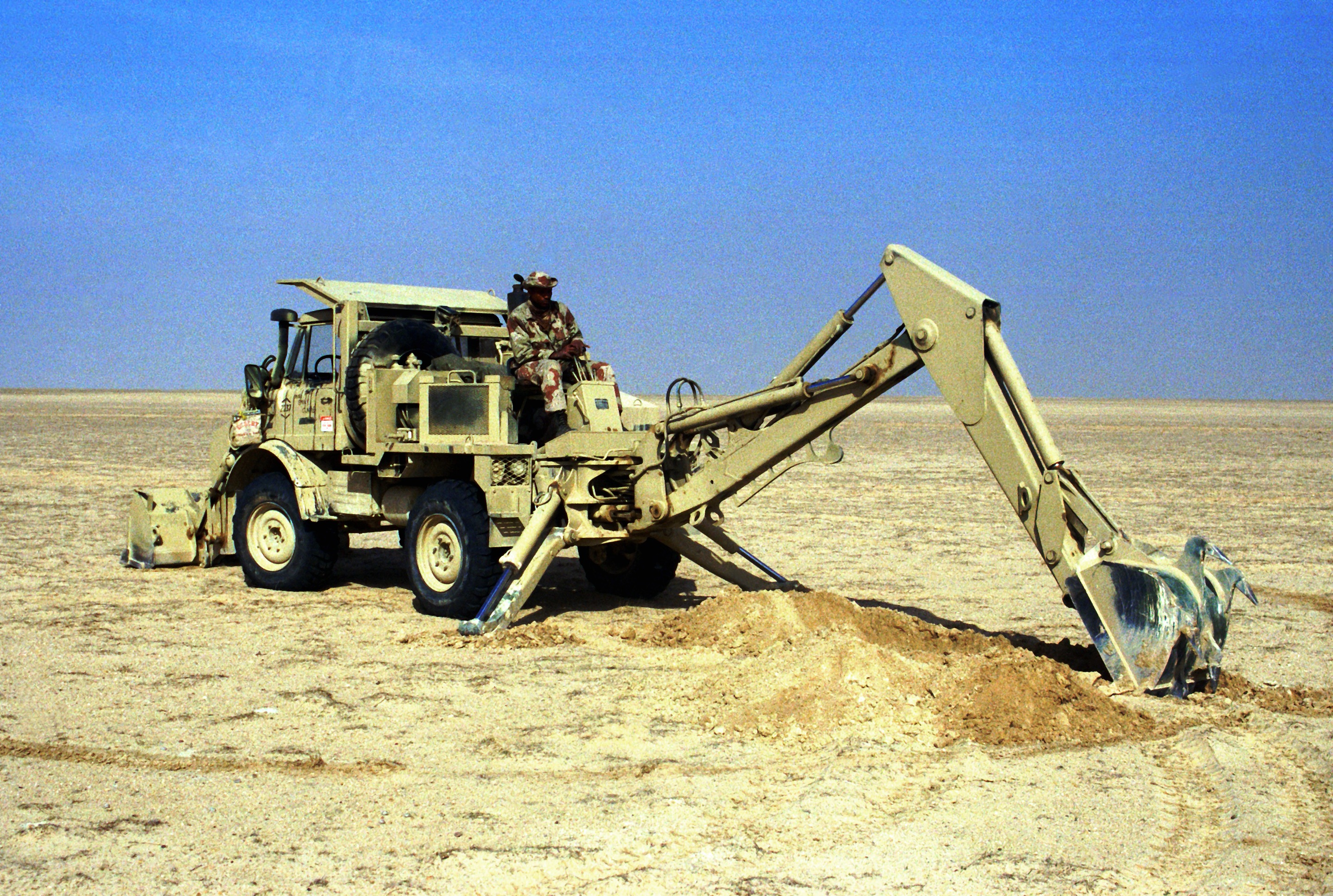
Unimog backhoe loader of the USMC during Operation Desert Storm

== Manufacturers ==
- BEML – (India)
- Bobcat Company – (United States)
- Case Corporation – (United States)
- Caterpillar – (United States)
- John Deere – (United States)
- Escorts Group – (India)
- Fiat – (Italy)
- Ford – (United States)
- HEPCO – (Iran)
- Hidromek – (Turkey)
- Hitachi – (Japan)
- Hydrema – (Denmark)
- Hyundai Heavy Industries – (South Korea)
- JCB – (United Kingdom)
- Komatsu – (Japan)
- LiuGong – (China)
- Mahindra – (India)
- Manitou Group – (France)
- New Holland Construction – (Italy)
- VF Venieri – (Italy)
- Volvo Construction Equipment – (Sweden)
- XCMG – (China)
