= Fiat Industrial =

Italian industrial group (2011–2013)

Fiat Industrial S.p.A.
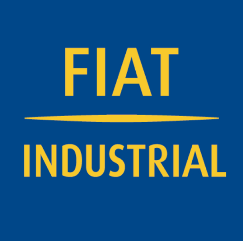
- Type: Società per azioni
- Industry: Heavy equipment
- Founded: July 2010; 16 years ago (incorporated)
- Defunct: September 29, 2013
- Fate: Merger
- Successor: CNH Industrial
- Headquarters: Turin, Italy
- Key people: Sergio Marchionne (Chairman)
- Products: Trucks, construction and agricultural machinery, industrial and marine powertrains
- Revenue: ▲€25.8 billion (2012)
- Operating income: ▲€2.1 billion (2012)
- Net income: ▲€921 million (2012)
- Number of employees: 68,257 (end 2012)
- Subsidiaries: CNH Global (87.4%), Iveco, FPT Industrial

Fiat Industrial S.p.A. was a short-lived Italian company into which Fiat S.p.A. (parent company of Fiat Group) demerged most of its activities not directly related to automobiles at the start of 2011. Fiat Industrial served as a holding company for the activities of truck manufacturer Iveco; an 89.3% stake in the agricultural and construction equipment producer CNH Global; and FPT Industrial, which consists of the industrial and marine activities formerly part of Fiat Powertrain Technologies. The company's Chairman was Sergio Marchionne, who also served as CEO of Fiat S.p.A. and Chairman/CEO of Chrysler Group LLC, now merged as Fiat Chrysler Automobiles.

Sergio Marchionne announced plans to separate Fiat's non-automotive businesses from Fiat Auto in April 2010. The proposed spin-off included businesses that accounted for about 35% of Fiat Group sales. Marchionne argued that separating them would give the industrial operations greater visibility, while allowing Fiat's automotive business greater flexibility to pursue mergers, partnerships, and additional capital as it sought greater scale in the car industry.

On 1 January 2011, each existing share of Fiat S.p.A. was converted into one Fiat share and one Fiat Industrial share. This resulted in Exor (the holding company controlled by the Agnelli family), the largest shareholder of Fiat with a stake of around 30%, holding an equivalent stake in Fiat Industrial. Exor has however raised the possibility of the future sale of some of its stake.

In September 2011, the company entered the DJSI World and Europe indexes as leader in the Industrial Engineering sector.

On 29 September 2013, CNH Global and Fiat Industrial were merged into CNH Industrial, a company incorporated in the Netherlands. Fiat Industrial shareholders received one CNH Industrial common share for every Fiat Industrial share held and CNH Global shareholders received 3.828 CNH Industrial common shares for every CNH Global common share held. CNH Industrial was subsequently listed on both the NYSE and the Milan stock exchange (Mercato Telematico Azionario).

== Sources ==
- Hassan, Ibne; Ghauri, Pervez N. (2014). Evaluating Companies for Mergers and Acquisitions. International Business and Management. Vol. 30. Emerald Group Publishing Limited. p. 50. doi:10.1108/S1876-066X201430. ISBN 978-1-78350-622-4.
