= Electric heavy equipment =

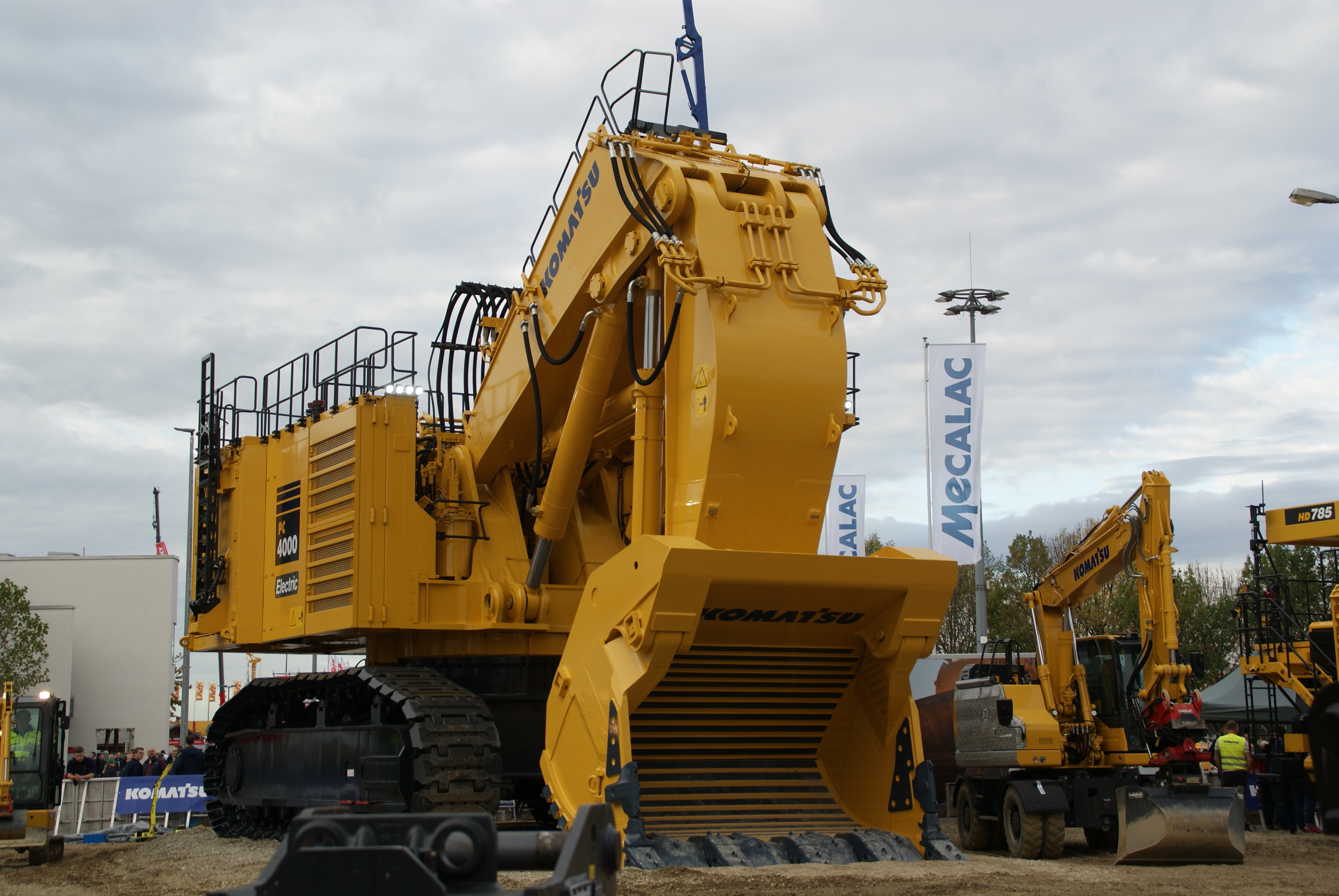
Electric crawler excavator PC4000-11E of Komatsu

Electric heavy equipment, electric heavy machinery, electric construction vehicles, or electric construction equipment, refers to a subcategory of heavy equipment propelled by electric motors. The majority of electric heavy equipment uses electrical energy stored in an onboard battery which makes them battery electric vehicles. For construction machines that are rarely moved, such as stationary excavators, a cable connection can also supply power. Electrified heavy machinery is considered a key development in the decarbonisation of the construction sector.

The introduction of electric heavy equipment follows the introduction of other heavy electric vehicles such as electric trucks. The requirements for construction machinery are highly diverse and pose a number of challenges for electrification. For example, mobile charging infrastructure is often required because most construction machinery cannot be relocated for charging. The required power and battery sizes can far exceed those of electric trucks and extreme temperatures, for example in road construction, challenge the temperature management of the batteries.

== Development ==
In 2012, Caterpillar presented the Cat 336E H, a hybrid crawler excavator weighing 37 tonnes. It saves up to 25% fuel through recuperation when braking the bucket. This was an important early milestone in the electrification of heavy equipment.

A 2017 study by IDTechEx Research analysed the potential of electric vehicles in construction, agriculture, and mining over the next 10 years up to 2027. The study found that the major manufacturers were still focusing on machines with hybrid drives, while other companies already offer small, fully-electric construction equipment. The sector was forecast to grow to 165,000 vehicles or USD 81 billion by 2027.

In 2017, Volvo and Skanska conducted a 10-week test of an electric quarry. Autonomous HX2 transporters and an EX1 wired excavator based on the EC750 model were used.

Also in 2017, the eDumper, an electric dump truck from Komatsu in cooperation with Kuhn Switzerland and Lithium Storage was presented. It has a 600 kWh battery and can transport loads of 55 tonnes. At the mining site where it operates, it even has a positive energy balance, as it travels uphill empty and can recuperate more energy on the way back than it needs due to the weight of the transported material.

In 2018, Cummins and Hyundai joined forces to enter the development of electric construction machinery. The first target was a 3.5-tonne compact excavator with a 35.2 kWh battery that could be used for a full eight-hour shift. A prototype of the R35E was unveiled in 2019.

In 2019, a report by McKinsey & Company found that in certain areas, the total cost of operating electric construction machinery was already 30% lower than comparable diesel models. The acquisition costs were calculated to be 30 to 90% higher, but the operating costs over 60% lower.

Since 2019, the company Pon Equipment has been offering converted 323F crawler excavators from Caterpillar as the so-called Z-Line. These machines have been converted with 300-kWh, 3.4-tonne batteries and are designed to work for up to seven hours.

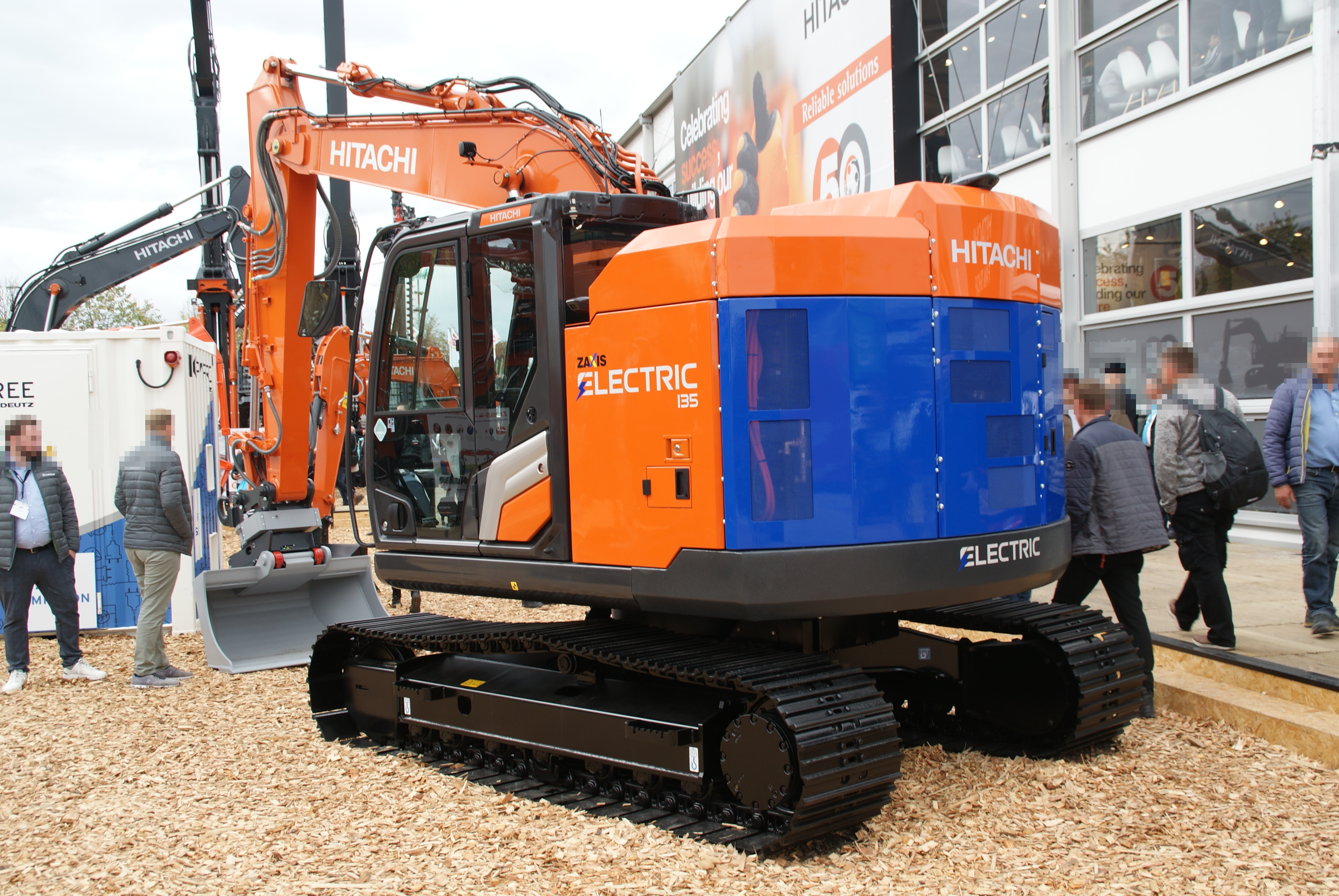
Electric crawler excavator Hitachi ZE135

In 2022, the Bauma trade fair chose "The Road to Zero Emissions" as one of its leitmotifs. Several electric construction machines were announced and presented, including tandem rollers, concrete mixing trucks, and the world's first all-electric T7X skid steer loader from Bobcat.

The "Electric Worksite" study conducted 2024 in Gothenburg with the participation of Volvo, investigated the feasibility of fully-electric construction sites using real examples in the city. Electrically-powered mobile and crawler excavators, wheel loaders and load carriers weighing between 3.5 and 30 tonnes were used, which were supplied with power either by battery or via cable connections.

A study by IDTechEx Research from 2024 states that the market for electric vehicles in construction was previously held back by high investment costs and customer reluctance due to limited battery capacities and small model selection. However, it was also observed that the entry phase of many manufacturers with small construction machinery and battery sizes comparable to electric cars is coming to an end and the trend is moving towards larger machines that can cover the full range of the construction machinery market.

In 2025, climate neutrality and alternative drives were the central themes of the Bauma trade fair.

== Advantages and disadvantages ==
=== Advantages ===
Electric heavy equipment can be operated in a climate-neutral way. They produce no local emissions, such as CO_{2} or nitrogen oxides, and are significantly quieter in operation than comparable heavy equipment with internal combustion engines. Electric motors require little maintenance and have high energy efficiency, which leads to lower operating and energy costs.

The low-noise operation makes them particularly suitable for use in noise-sensitive locations such as residential areas or allows for use during sensitive times, for example at night. The absence of exhaust fumes makes electric construction machinery ideal for poorly-ventilated environments such as tunnels and indoor areas. Both also reduce the strain on operators and other workers on construction sites and comply with increasing environmental regulations.

Electrification of the drive system is accelerating the introduction of electronic systems in construction machinery and is also making automation easier.

Using the example of a 10-tonne standard excavator, a study by IDTechEx calculated annual costs for diesel of USD 6,500 in 2024, while the electricity for the electric model would cost USD 3,350.

=== Disadvantages ===
At present, electric heavy equipment is still significantly more expensive to purchase and may also require additional investment in charging infrastructure. The price premium compared to comparable models with combustion engines is between 50% and 100%.

The possible working time without charging breaks is limited by the battery capacity. While larger batteries increase the purchase price, smaller batteries require good integration of the charging process into the operation. The high weight of the batteries is often not a disadvantage, which enables the use of cheaper variants such as LFP batteries and, if necessary, replaces some of the counterweights required for excavators and cranes.

== Charging infrastructure ==
Various concepts are being developed for the charging infrastructure of heavy machinery, which are optimised for different types of construction sites. For stationary excavators or machines that are only slightly mobile, a local power supply via cable is a good option, if possible. Construction machinery that is only used for short periods on small construction sites and is easy to move can be charged at the construction company's depot or at public charging stations. For other construction sites, it may be necessary to set up mobile fast charging stations that either use an existing power grid or are supplied via mobile power storage units that have to be brought to depots for charging.

== Distribution ==
According to an estimate by Custom Market Insights, the global market for electric construction equipment was valued at USD 14.5 billion in 2024 and is expected to grow to USD 37.4 billion by 2033.

So far, the main drivers of the spread are initiatives and guidelines from governments and municipalities, but also the low long-term maintenance costs.

=== Public funding ===
Municipal initiatives are incentivising companies to use electric machines. Berlin has pilot projects with fully electric construction machinery. Initiatives in Oslo, Copenhagen, and London are aiming for climate-neutral operations by 2030. Helsinki is part of a Finnish Green Deal initiative for emission-free construction sites and is already demanding electric excavators for selected construction sites.

== Categories ==
=== Excavators ===
==== Large excavators ====
| Model | Brand | Weight | Power | Battery capacity | Operation time | Characteristics |
|---|---|---|---|---|---|---|
| PC4000-11E | Komatsu | 409 t | 1400 kW | N/A | unlimited | Used in mines with power connection |
| ZE135 | Hitachi | 14.6 t | | 300 kWh | 6 h | |
| DX300LC Electric | Doosan | 32.3 t | 145 kW | 390 kWh | 8 h | exchangeable batteries |
| 145 X-Tier | John Deere | unknown | unknown | unknown | unknown | |
| PC210E-11 | Komatsu | 24 t | 123 kW | 451 kWh | 8 h | |
| EC230 Electric | Volvo | 21 t | 160 kW | 450 kWh | 4–5 h | |

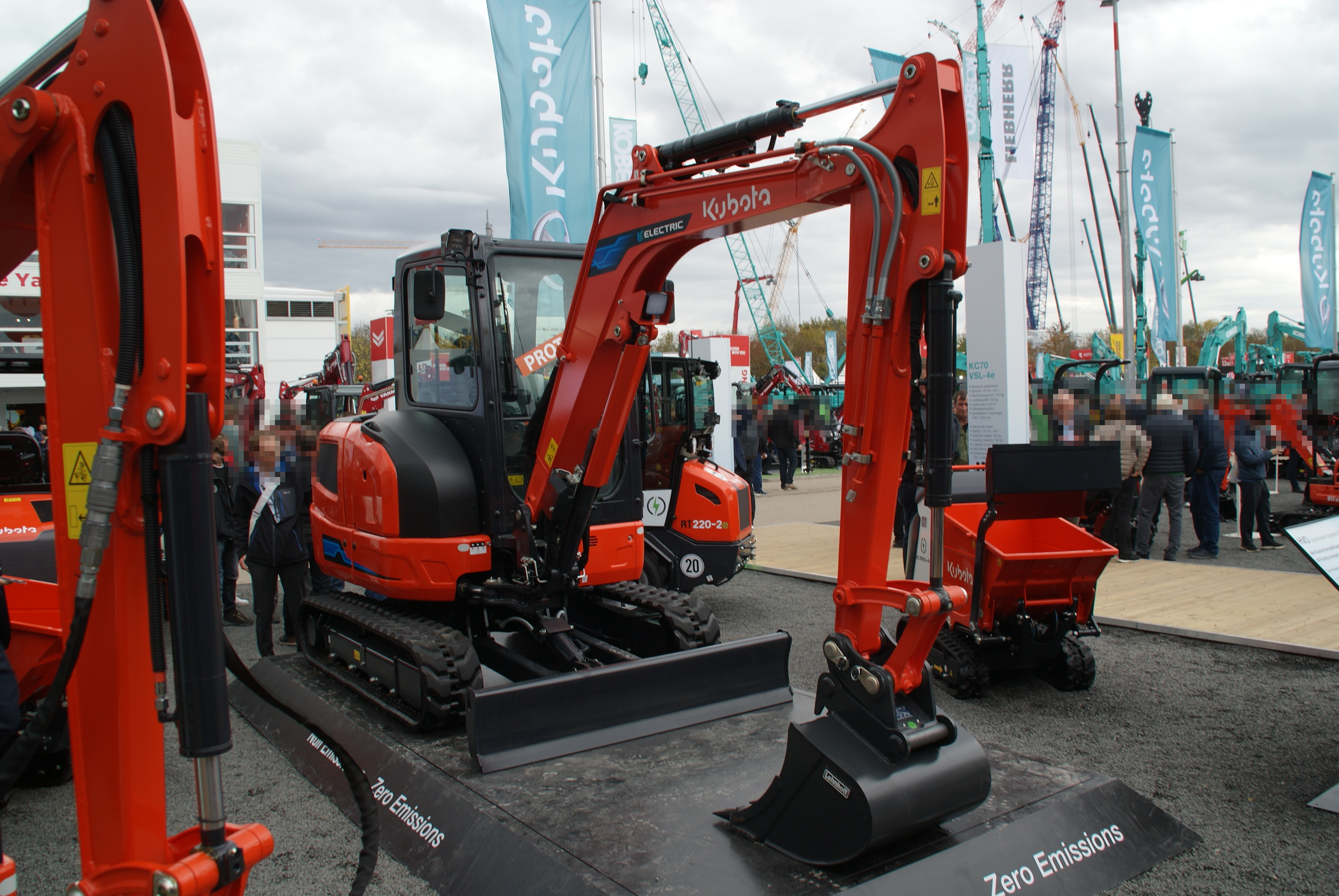
Electric compact excavator KX38-4e from Kubota

==== Mini and compact excavators ====
Mini and compact excavators are hydraulic excavators that are used in light earthworks, gardening and landscaping and generally weigh a maximum of 8.5 tonnes.

| Model | Brand | Weight | Power | Battery capacity | Operation time |
|---|---|---|---|---|---|
| ZE19-T | Hitachi | 2 t | unknown | 26,4 kWh | 4 h |
| ZX55U-6EB | Hitachi | 5.3 t | 33 kW | 40 kWh | 2 h |
| ZEX85-6EB | Hitachi | 8.8 t | 40 kW | 133 kWh | 5.5 h |
| DX19 Electric | Doosan | 2.1 t | 15 kW | 32 kWh | 8 h |
| PC138E-11 | Komatsu | 15.3 t | 72,5 kW | 225.6 kWh | 8 h |
| PC33E-6 | Komatsu | 3.6 t | 17,4 kW | 35 kWh | 3 h |
| 9C-1E | JCB | 1.9 t | 20 kW | 19.8 kWh | 4 h |
| KX38-4e | Kubota | 4 t | 17.8 kW | 49.2 kWh | 5 h |
| ECR25 Electric | Volvo | 2.6 t | 18 kW | 40 kWh | 4 h |
| ECR18 Electric | Volvo | 1.8 t | 18 kW | 16 kWh | 5 h |

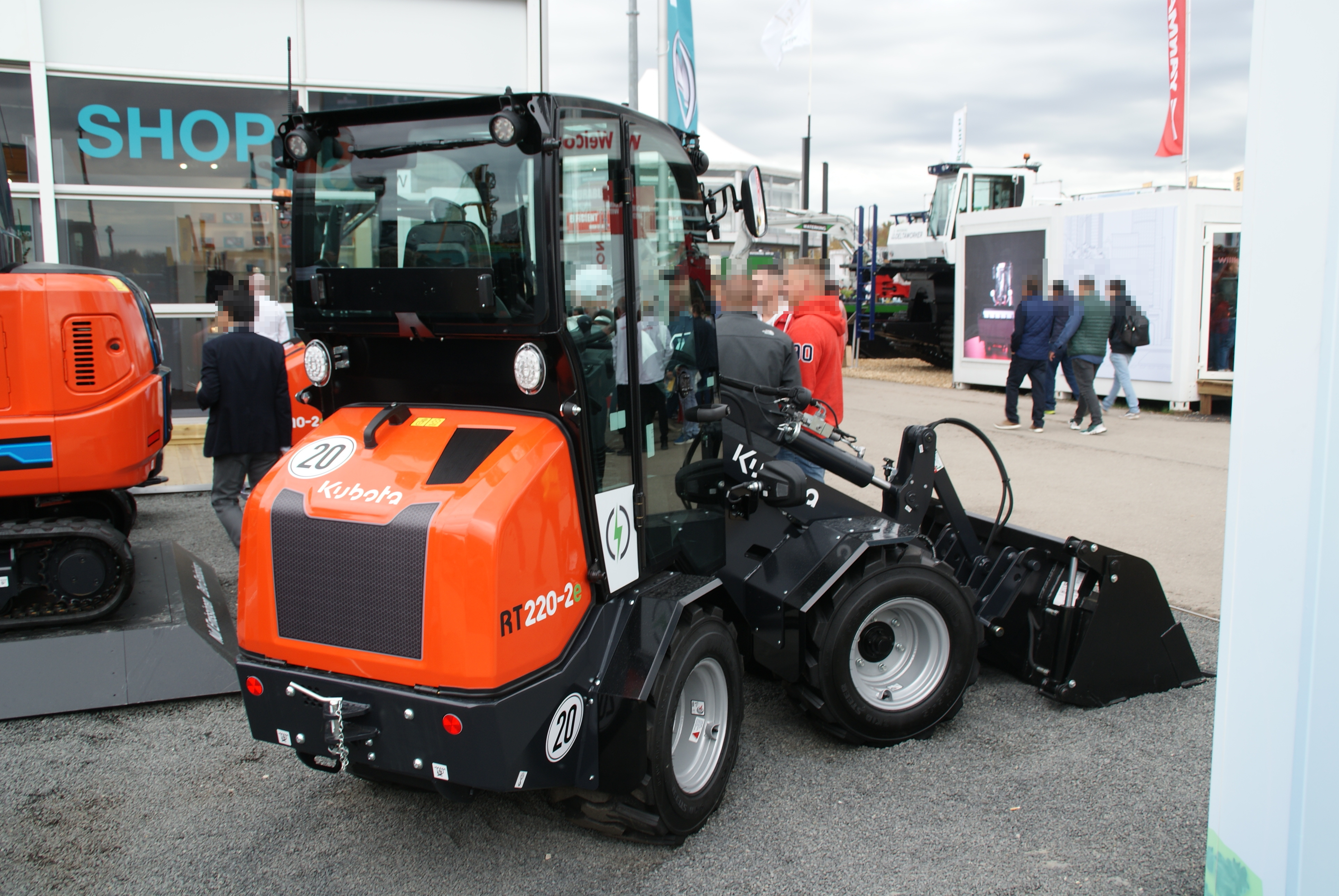
Electric wheel loader RT220-2e from Kubota at Bauma 2022

=== Loaders ===
| Model | Brand | Weight | Power | Battery capacity | Operation time |
|---|---|---|---|---|---|
| L25 Electric | Volvo | 4.9 t | 22 kW | 40 kWh | 8 h |
| L90 Electric | Volvo | 15 t | 140 kW | 180 kWh | 4–6 h |
| L120 Electric | Volvo | 20 t | 228 kW | 282 kWh | 5–9 h |
| 5065e | Kramer | 3.9 t | 23.2 kW | 37.5 kWh | 4 h |
| T7X | Bobcat | 5.7 t | 75 kW | 72.6 kWh | 6 h |
| 580EV | CASE | 9 t | 80 kW | 72.7 kWh | unknown |
| RT220-2e | Kubota | 2.2 t | 6.5 kW | 25 kWh | unknown |

=== Bulldozers ===
| Model | Brand | Weight | Power | Battery capacity | Operation time | Characteristics |
|---|---|---|---|---|---|---|
| "All-electric underwater bulldozer" | Komatsu | unknown | unknown | 500 kWh | 6 h | Bulldozer for underwater |
| ML 6 Moonlander | Lumina | 32 t | 552 kW | 414 kWh | unknown | can be used autonomously |

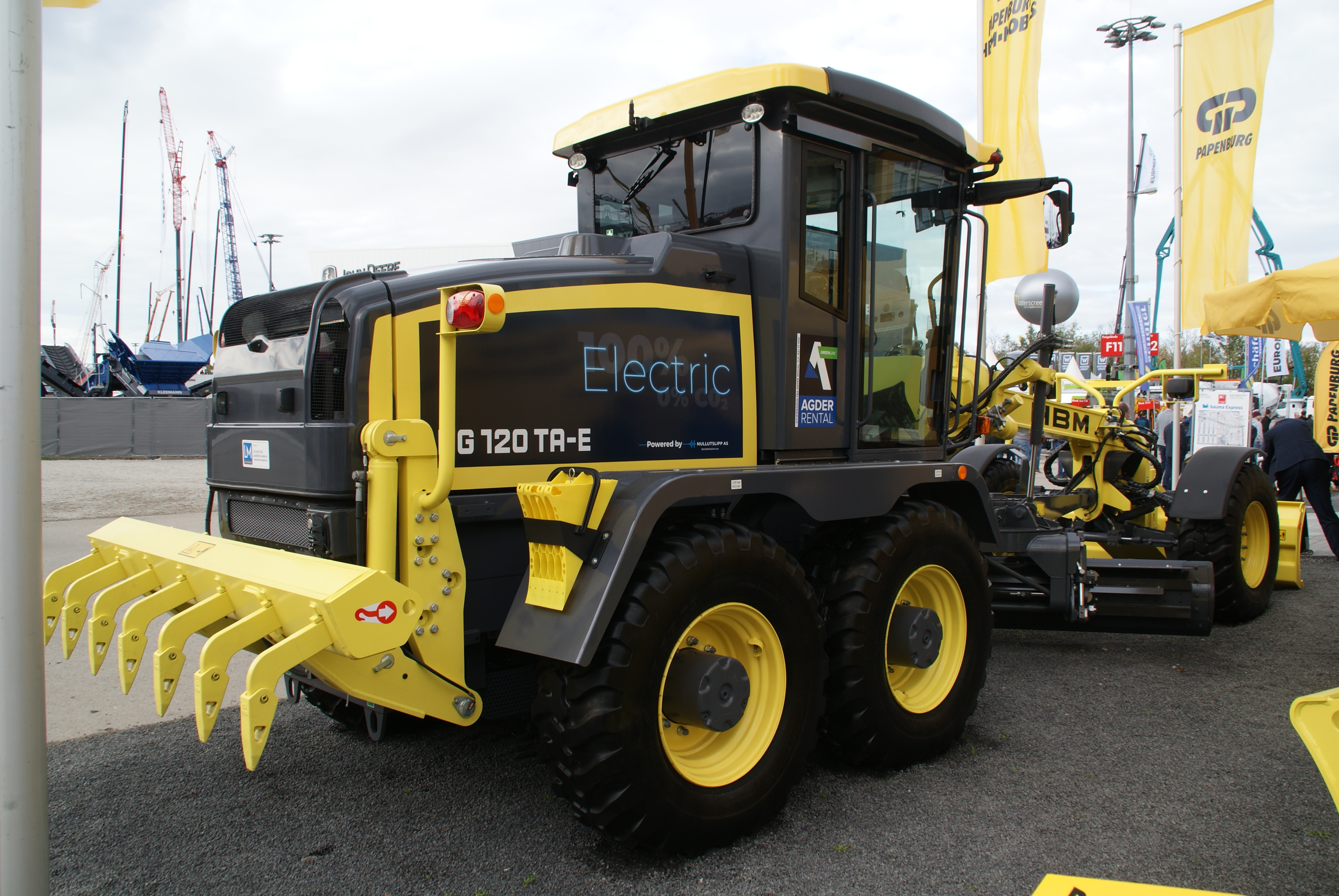
HBM-NOBAS BG 120 TA-E electric road grader at Bauma 2022

=== Graders ===
| model | brand | weight | power | battery capacity | operation time |
|---|---|---|---|---|---|
| BG 120 TA-E | HBM-NOBAS | 15.5 t | 110 kW | 325 kWh | 8 h |

=== Transporters ===
Trucks with road licences are often used to transport construction materials. Specialised vehicle types for construction sites such as dump trucks are listed here.

==== Dump trucks ====
| Model | Brand | Weight | Power | Battery capacity | Operation time | Characteristics |
|---|---|---|---|---|---|---|
| A30 Electric | Volvo | 29 t | 265 kW | 245 kWh | unknown | |
| A40 Electric | Volvo | 39 t | 350 kW | 350 kWh | unknown | |
| eDumper | Komatsu | 45 t | 588 kW | 600 kWh | unknown | recuperates more energy than it consumes |

=== Material handlers ===
==== Mobile cranes ====
| Model | Brand | Weight | Power | Battery capacity | Operation time | Characteristics |
|---|---|---|---|---|---|---|
| MK5150XLe Plug-in-Hybrid | Manitowoc | 60 t | unknown | 180 kWh | 5 h | Fully-electric use in crane operation |
| LR 1250.1 unplugged | Liebherr | 212 t | 255 kW | unknown | 8 h | |
| LR 1300.2 SX unplugged | Liebherr | 293 t | 438 kW | 392 kWh | 13 h | |
| 653 E | Sennebogen | unknown | 130 kW | 210 kWh | 14 h | |

==== Telehandlers ====
| Model | Brand | Weight | Power | Battery capacity | Operation time | Characteristics |
|---|---|---|---|---|---|---|
| 525-60E | JCB | 5.1 t | 39 kW | 24 kWh | unknown | |
| 17.45 | Faresin | 12.1 t | 51 kW | 45 kWh | unknown | |

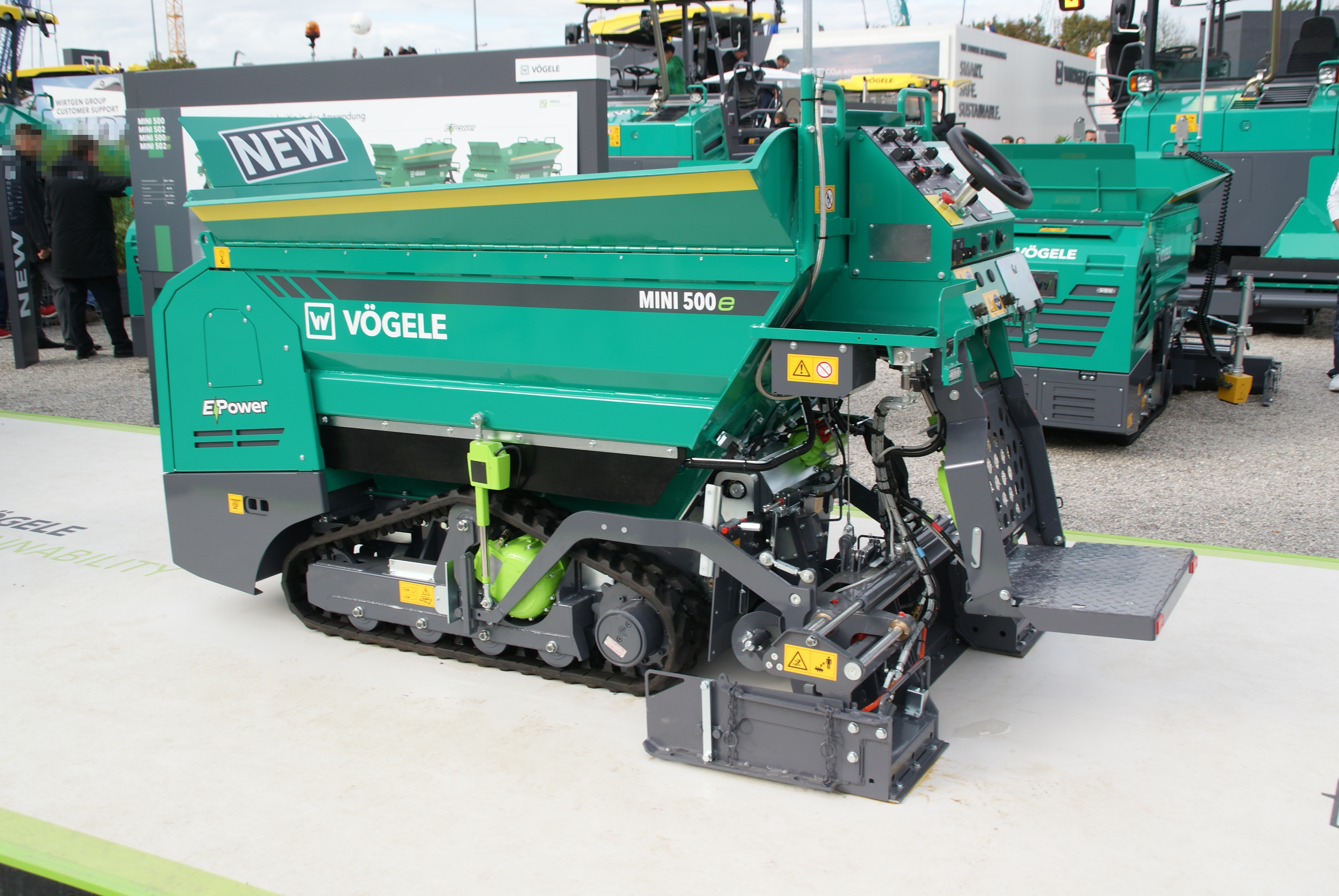
Electric asphalt paver MINI 500e from Vögele at Bauma 2022

=== Highway engineering ===
Some heavy equipment is specialised for highway engineering.

==== Pavers ====
| Model | Brand | Weight | Power | Battery capacity | Operation time |
|---|---|---|---|---|---|
| MINI 500e | Vögele | 1.5 t | unknown | 21.5 kWh | unknown |
| SUPER 1300-5e | Vögele | 11 t | unknown | 126 kWh | unknown |
| SD1800W e | Dynapac | 10.3 t | 55 kW | 98 kWh | unknown |

==== Road rollers ====
| Model | Brand | Weight | Power | Battery capacity | Operation time |
|---|---|---|---|---|---|
| DD25 Electric | Volvo | 2.7 t | 96 kW | 20 kWh | 4 h |

=== Concrete handling ===
==== Concrete pumps ====
| Model | Brand | Weight | Power | Battery capacity | Operation time |
|---|---|---|---|---|---|
| CP 2800 BE | Schwing Stetter | 13.5 t | 112 kW | 112 kWh | 8 h |
| prototype | Volvo | 32 t | 330 kW | 360 kWh | unknown |

==== Concrete mixing trucks ====
| Model | Brand | Weight | Power | Battery capacity | Operation time |
|---|---|---|---|---|---|
| ETM 1005/1205 | Liebherr | unknown | 500 kW | 340 kWh | unknown |
| FMX electric concrete mixer | Volvo | unknown | 330 kW | 360 kWh | unknown |

=== Compactors ===
==== Rollers ====
| Model | Brand | Weight | Power | Battery capacity | Operation time |
|---|---|---|---|---|---|
| BW 177 DH e | BOMAG | 7 t | unknown | 78 kWh | unknown |

=== Drilling rigs ===
| Model | Brand | Weight | Power | Battery capacity | Operation time |
|---|---|---|---|---|---|
| LB 16 unplugged | Liebherr | 59.4 t | 265 kW | none | 10 h |

== See also ==
- Electric vehicle
