= Schwing =

Schwing may refer to:

== People ==
- Anna-Lena Schwing (born 1996), German actress
- Carl Georg Schwing (1778–1858), German jurist and mayor of Stralsund
- Hans-Elmar Schwing (born 1972), German chess player
- Hellmuth Schwing, German infantry commander
- Roland Schwing (1949–2017), German politician
- William Schwing Patout III (1932–2017), American businessman and agricultural engineer

== Companies ==
- Folmer and Schwing Manufacturing Company, later Graflex
- Schwing (company), German manufacturer of concrete pumps and truck mixers
- Schwing Stetter, German manufacturer of concrete mixers and concrete transport systems

== Other uses ==
- An exclamation used in the Wayne's World sketches and films
- German exonym for Žminj in Croatia
