= KMRAP =

South Korean mine-resistant IMV

KMRAP – Korea Mine Resistant Ambush Protected is an MRAP infantry mobility vehicle that can protect the occupants from antitank mines and IEDs using anti-shock seats and reinforced V-hull that deflect blast.

It is built by Doosan of South Korea.
