= XCMG =

Chinese state-owned construction machinery manufacturer

XCMG Group

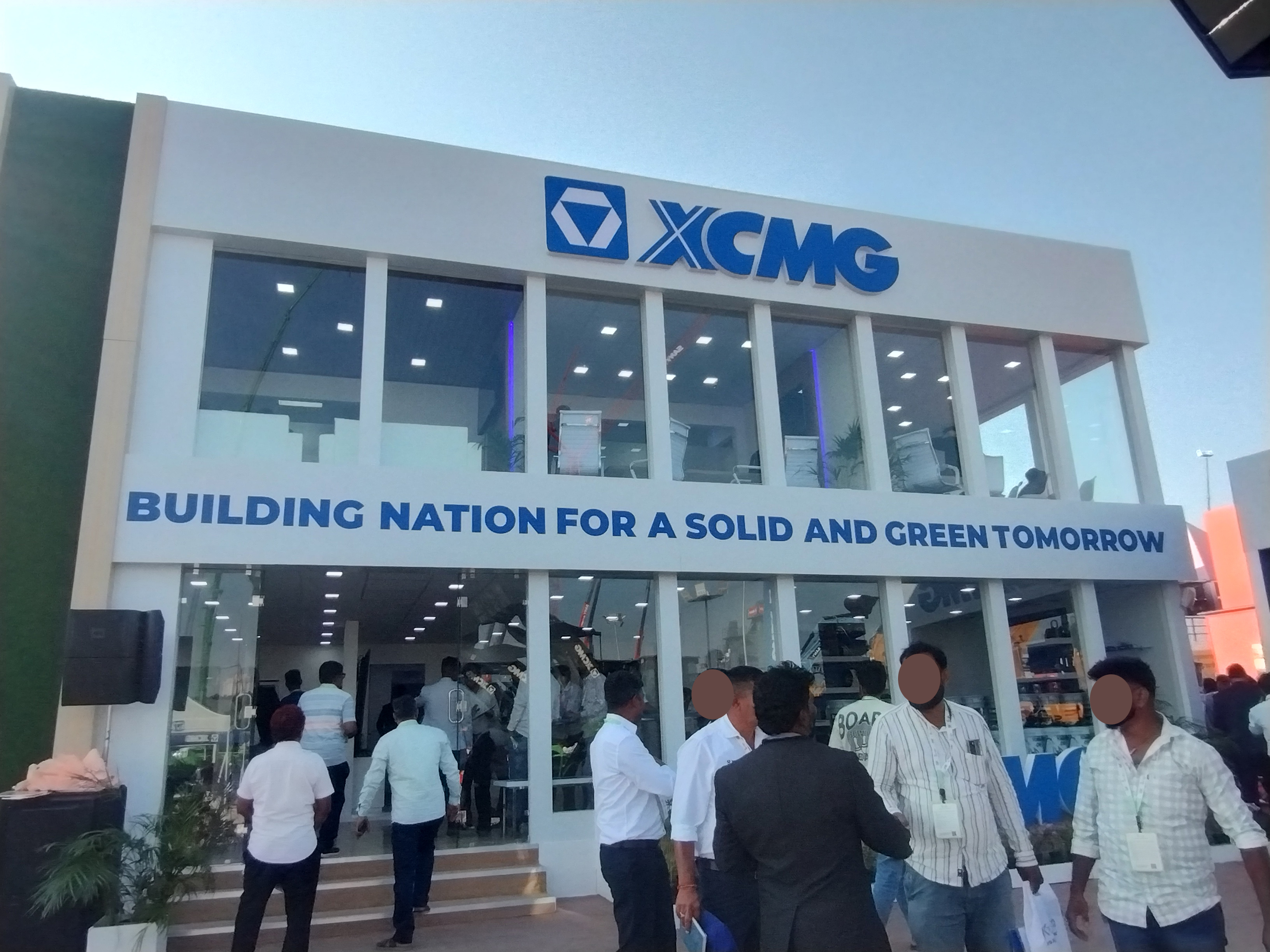
- XCMG at EXCON 2025, BIEC
- Native name: 徐工集团
- Type: State-owned limited company
- Traded as: SZSE: 000425; CSI A100 Index
- Industry: Heavy equipment
- Founded: 1943 (as predecessor enterprises)
- Headquarters: Xuzhou, China
- Area served: Worldwide
- Products: Construction equipment Cranes; Trucks
- Revenue: ▲CN¥100.823 billion (US$14.2 billion)
- Number of employees: 30,000
- Subsidiaries: XCMG Construction Machinery Co., Ltd. Perlini; Schwing
- Website: en.xcmg.com/en-ap/

Xuzhou Construction Machinery Group Co., Ltd. (Chinese: 徐工集团; pinyin: Xúgōng Jítuán), commonly known as XCMG Group, is a Chinese state-owned multinational manufacturer of construction and heavy machinery headquartered in Xuzhou, Jiangsu, China. It is one of the world’s largest construction equipment producers and a flagship enterprise in China’s machinery manufacturing sector.

As of 2021, XCMG ranked first in China’s construction machinery industry and third globally. It also placed fourth among China’s top 100 machinery enterprises and 376th in the World’s 500 Most Influential Brands published by World Brand Lab.

XCMG’s principal operating subsidiary, XCMG Construction Machinery Co., Ltd., has been publicly listed on the Shenzhen Stock Exchange since 1996.

The group’s products are sold in more than 180 countries and regions worldwide, reaching approximately 97% of countries participating in the Belt and Road Initiative. XCMG operates more than 20 manufacturing bases in China, an overseas headquarters in Davao City, the Philippines, over 300 overseas distributors, more than 2,000 service centers, approximately 40 overseas offices, and over 30 overseas branches.

In addition to its domestic operations, XCMG maintains research and development centers, manufacturing facilities, and CKD/KD assembly plants in more than 10 countries, including Germany, the United States, Brazil, and India. Through overseas acquisitions, the group has expanded its international footprint, including the acquisition of European manufacturers such as Schwing.

== History ==
=== Early development (1943–1988) ===
XCMG traces its origins to several industrial enterprises founded during the mid-20th century. In 1943, one of its main predecessors, Huaxing Iron Factory, was established and later became Xuzhou Heavy Machinery Factory. In 1948 and 1949, Jinan Meifeng Pound Factory and Xuzhou Shunhe Auto Repair Shop were founded; these later evolved into Xuzhou Construction Machinery Manufacturing Factory and Xuzhou Loader Factory, respectively. Together, these entities formed the industrial foundation of XCMG.

In 1957, Huaxing Iron Factory completed trial production of its first tower crane, marking the company’s entry into construction machinery. In 1960, China’s first 10-tonne steamroller was developed, followed in 1963 by the country’s first 5-tonne truck-mounted crane.

=== Group formation and early expansion (1989–1999) ===
In March 1989, XCMG Group was formally established in Xuzhou under a “three factories, one institute” structure, integrating Xuzhou Heavy Machinery Factory, Xuzhou Loader Factory, Xuzhou Construction Machinery Manufacturing Factory, and Xuzhou Construction Machinery Research Institute. This made XCMG the first group company in China’s construction machinery industry.

In 1992, then General Secretary of the Chinese Communist Party Jiang Zemin inspected XCMG. That year, XCMG became the first Chinese construction machinery company authorized to conduct independent exports and participated in the Bauma exhibition in Germany as the first and only Chinese exhibitor.

In 1993, Xuzhou Construction Machinery Co., Ltd. was incorporated. During the mid-1990s, XCMG entered a series of international joint ventures, including Caterpillar (Xuzhou) Co., Ltd. in 1994, Xuzhou Liebherr Concrete Machinery Co., Ltd. in 1995, and Xuzhou Rockwell Axle Co., Ltd. in 1996.

In 1995, XCMG was restructured into a wholly state-owned enterprise under its current legal name. In 1996, XCMG Construction Machinery Co., Ltd. was listed on the Shenzhen Stock Exchange (SZSE: 000425). In 1997, XCMG was selected as both a national pilot enterprise for modern corporate systems and a pilot enterprise group at the national level.

=== Globalization and restructuring (2011–present) ===
In 2011, XCMG launched its “Hanfeng Plan,” reorganizing its operations into five major business units. The group also entered into cooperation with the Venezuelan government to establish a local construction equipment manufacturing joint venture. That same year, XCMG acquired high-end hydraulic technology providers AMCA (Netherlands) and Fluitronics (Germany) and ranked fifth globally in the construction machinery industry.

In 2012, XCMG completed four major industrial bases and a RMB 1 billion research institute in Xuzhou. New manufacturing facilities for cranes, loaders, and concrete machinery were commissioned, with a total investment of approximately US$1.9 billion. XCMG also began construction of a research and development center in Krefeld, Germany, and acquired a majority stake in German concrete machinery manufacturer Schwing.

During this period, XCMG developed several ultra-large cranes, including the XGC88000 crawler crane and the QAY1600 all-terrain crane, which were among the largest of their type globally.

From 2013 onward, XCMG expanded its overseas presence through the establishment of XCMG Europe GmbH, a European research center in Düsseldorf, and international procurement operations. It also entered the financial services sector through XCMG Group Finance Co., Ltd.

In 2014, XCMG completed its first wholly owned overseas manufacturing base in Brazil and established a research center in the United States. In subsequent years, the group expanded into environmental equipment, heavy trucks, and sanitation machinery. In 2016, XCMG unveiled the DE400 mining dump truck, described as the largest Chinese-made construction vehicle at the time.

By 2019, XCMG equipment had been used in record-setting projects, including high-altitude wind power installations. In 2021, XCMG signed a memorandum of understanding with Vale to explore cooperation on autonomous and zero-emission mining equipment.

== Products ==
XCMG manufactures a broad range of construction and industrial machinery across more than 16 product categories. Its product portfolio includes cranes, excavators, concrete machinery, mining equipment, loaders, road machinery, special-purpose vehicles, aerial work platforms, piling and foundation equipment, tunnel and trenchless machinery, environmental protection equipment, firefighting machinery, energy drilling equipment, and port machinery. The group also develops core components such as hydraulic systems, transmissions, and electronic control systems.

== Media gallery ==
XCMG at EXCON 2025, BIEC
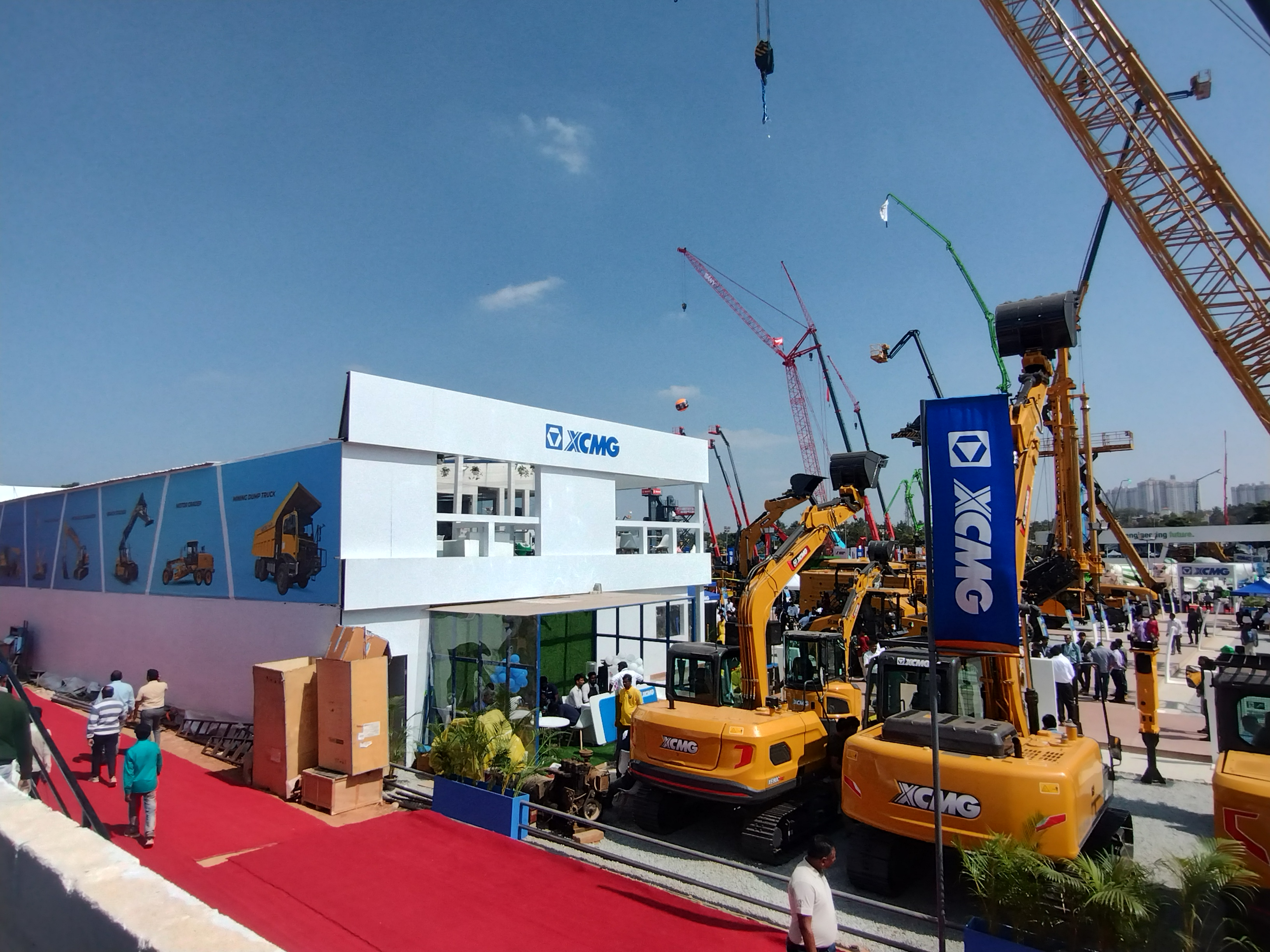

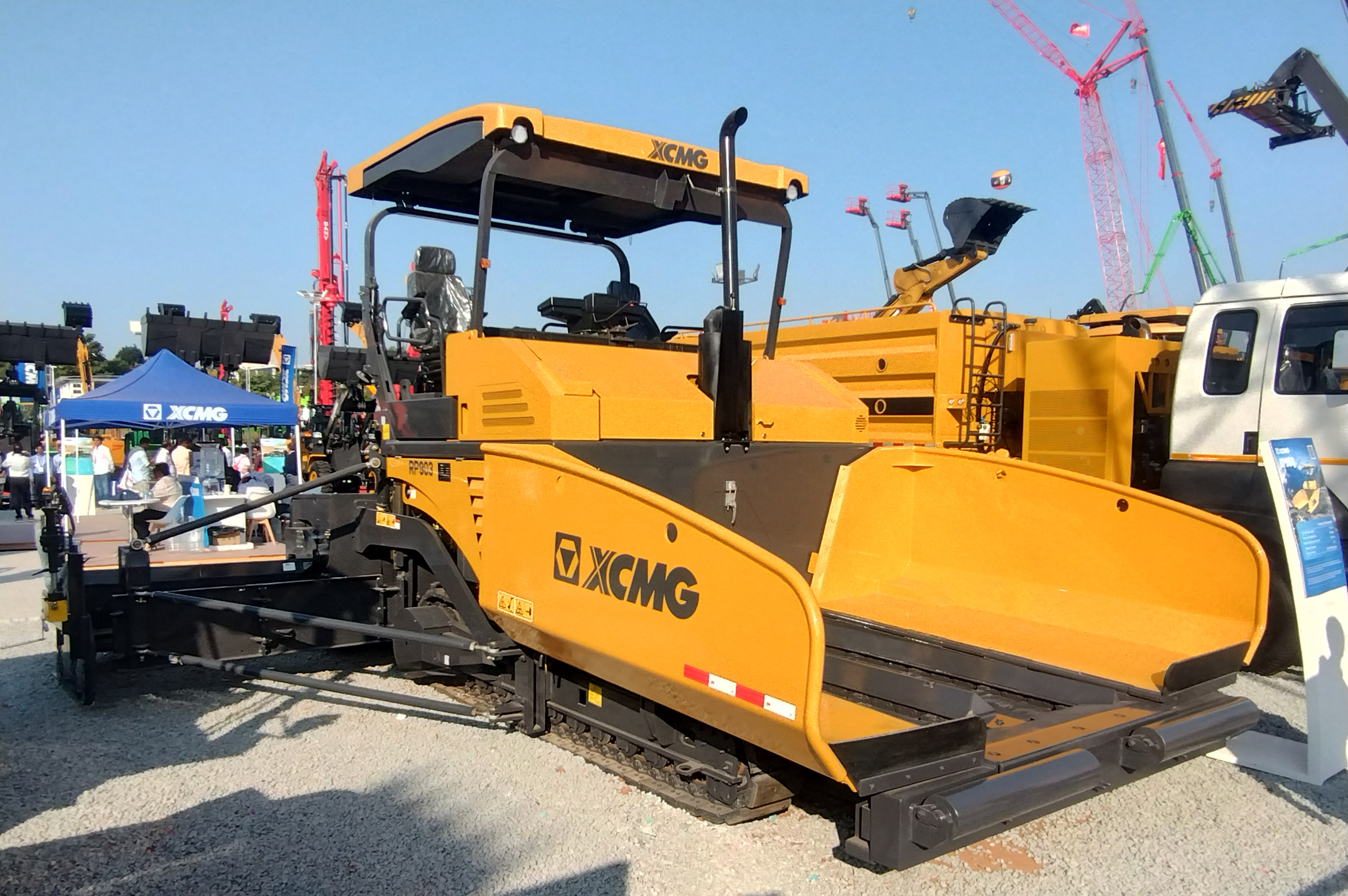

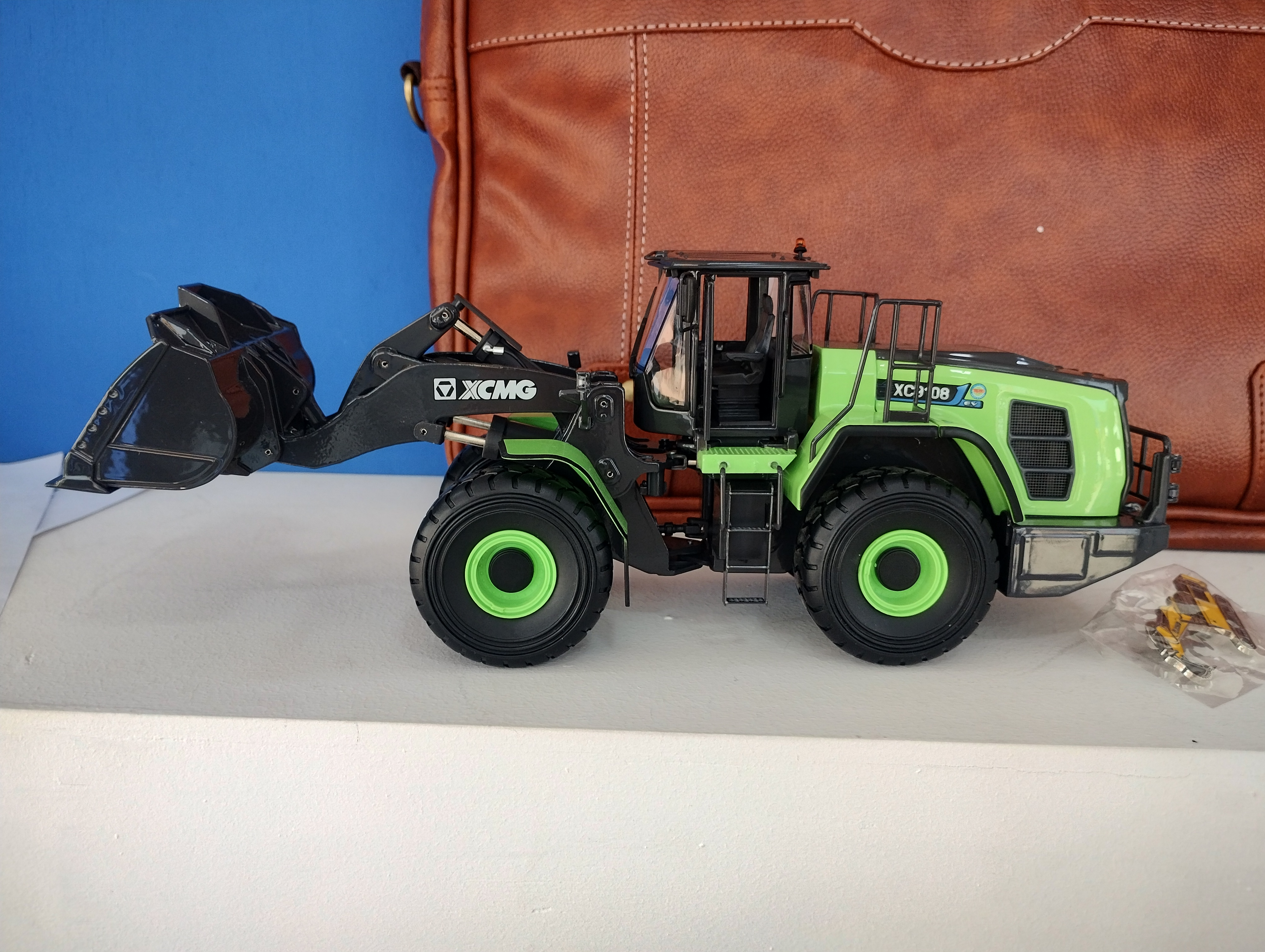

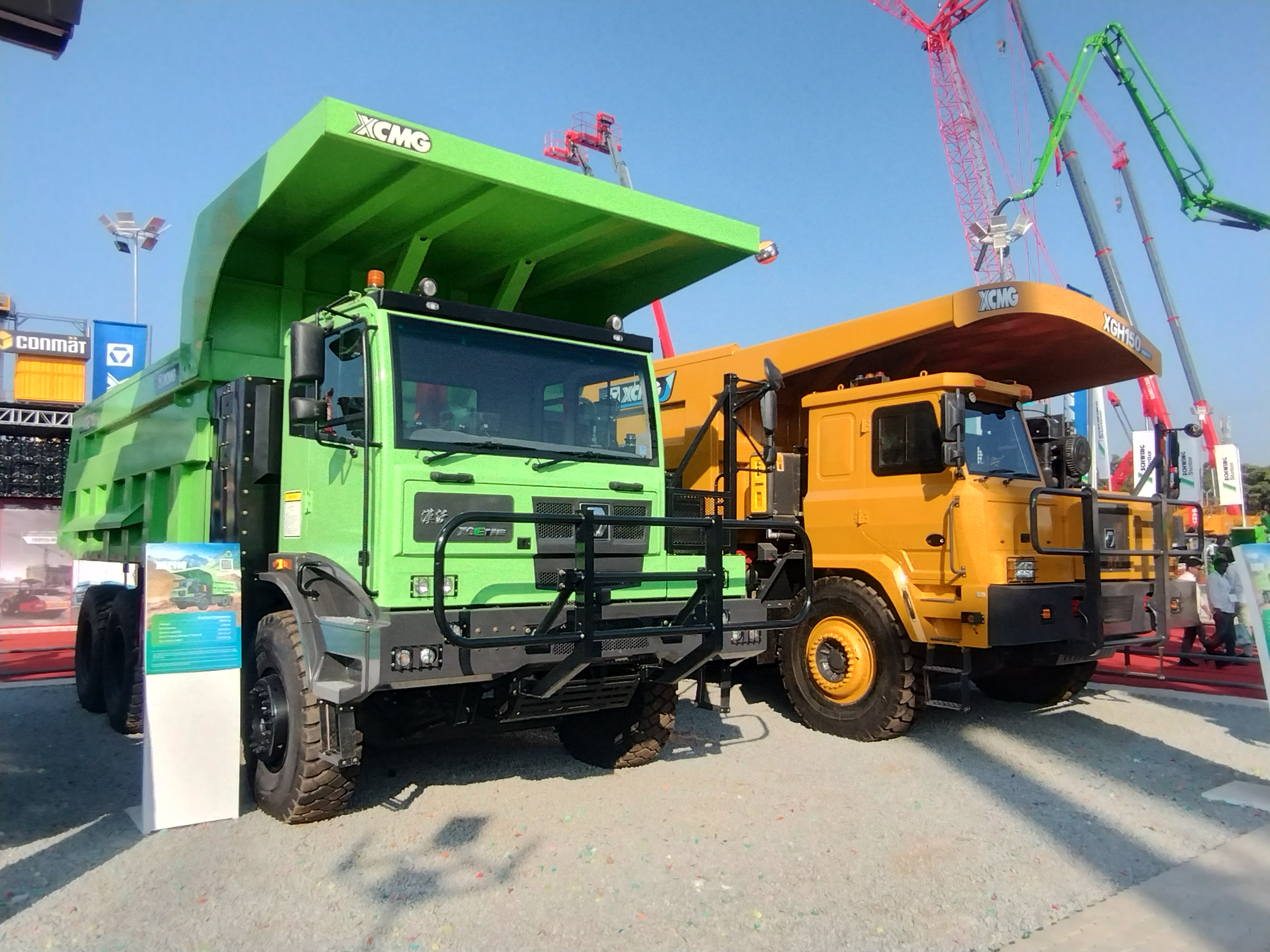

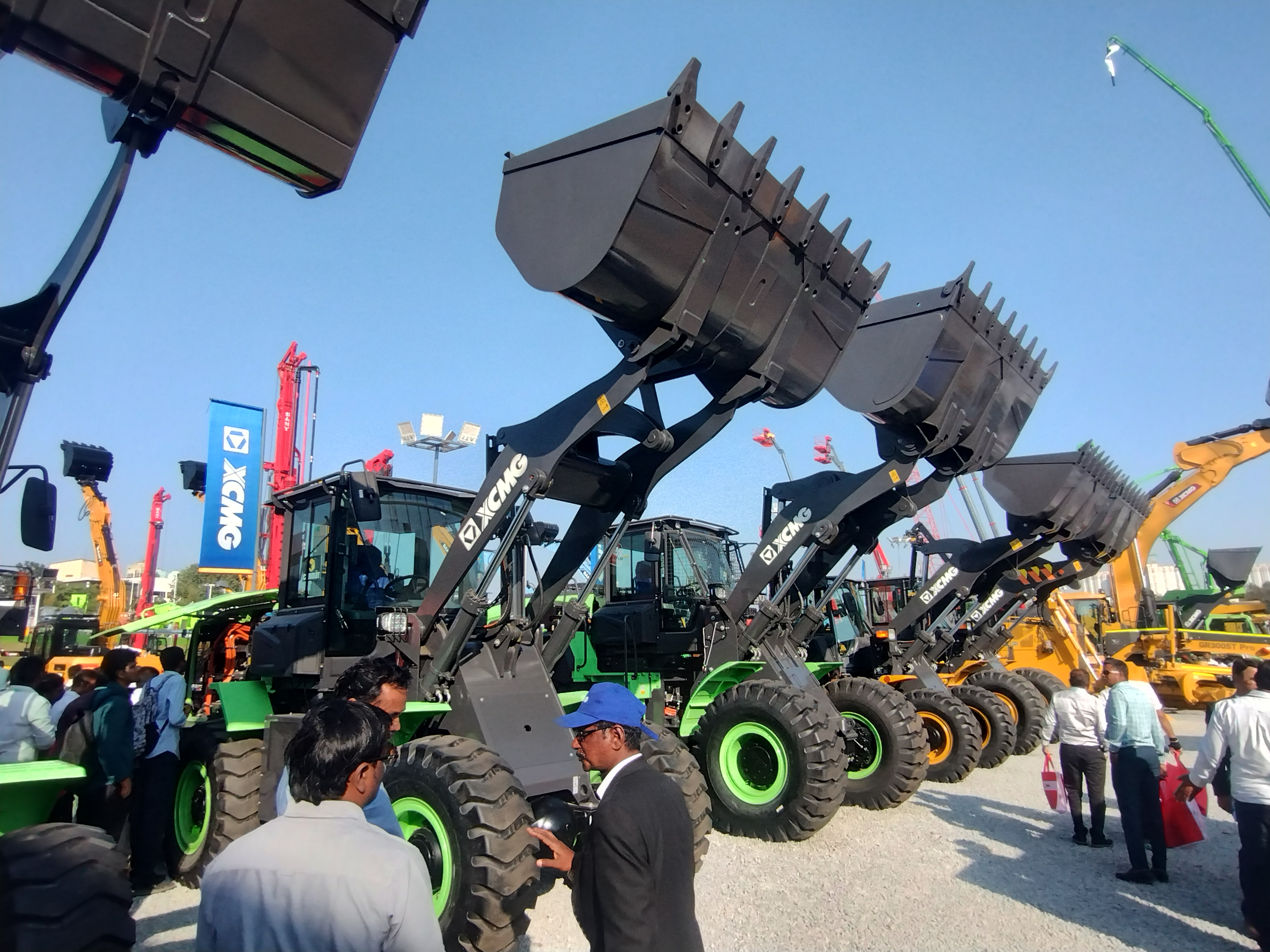
