= Bobcat Company =

American construction and farm equipment manufacturer

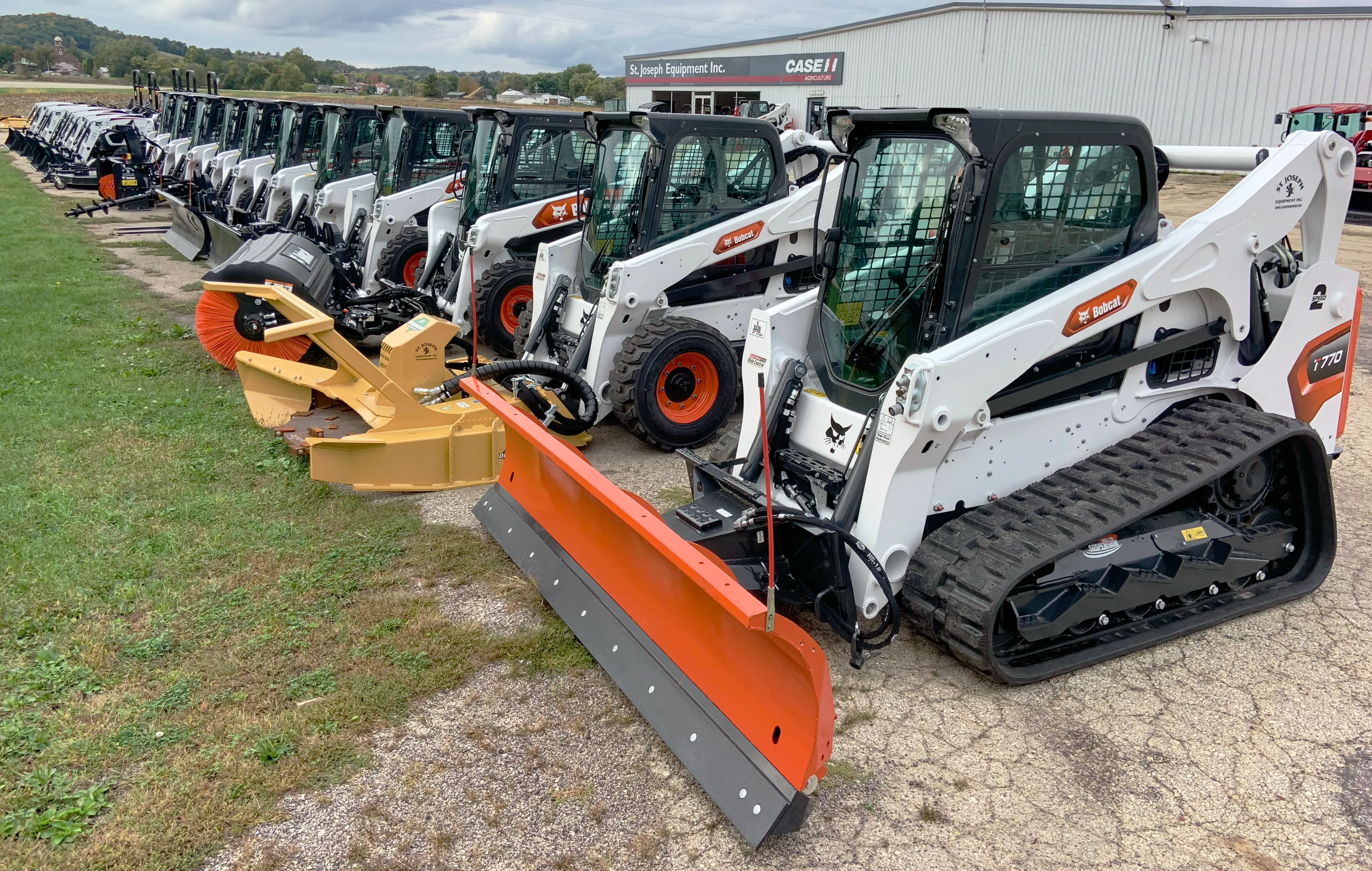
- Bobcat skid-steers with different attachments
- Formerly: Melroe (1947–1962); Melroe Bobcat (1962–1972)
- Type: Subsidiary
- Industry: Construction equipment
- Founded: 1947; 79 years ago Gwinner, North Dakota, U.S.
- Headquarters: Seongnam, South Korea
- Products: Specialized excavators Loaders; Engines
- Revenue: US$6.674 billion (2022)
- Number of employees: ~9,000 (2021)
- Parent: Doosan Corporation, via Doosan Bobcat Inc.
- Website: bobcat.com

Bobcat Company is a South Korean manufacturer of farm and construction equipment headquartered in Seongnam, South Korea.

Bobcat was a subsidiary of the Ingersoll Rand Company from 1995 until July 2007, when it was sold for US$4.9 billion to South Korean company Doosan Infracore, which has now been merged into HD Construction Equipment.

Bobcat sells skid steer loaders, compact excavators, side-by-sides, compact tractors, mowers, and other small hydraulic equipment. It is one of the few major manufacturing companies operating in North Dakota.

== History ==
In the 1950s, Louis and Cyril Keller operated Keller Welding and Repair near Rothsay, Minnesota. In 1956, Eddie Velo, a turkey farmer in the area, described to the Kellers a need for a machine small enough to maneuver inside a pole barn and light enough to operate on its upper level. The brothers developed a small, three-wheeled design with a belt-driven transmission, and delivered it to Velo on February 4, 1957.

Velo gave the Kellers full access to his operations, and after the Kellers learned of drawbacks with the belt-driven transmission, they developed and patented a more robust clutch-based transmission system in 1958. The new transmission became the basis of the Melroe M60 loader.

The Kellers' uncle, an equipment dealer for the Melroe Manufacturing Company based in Gwinner, North Dakota, suggested that Melroe market the machines, resulting in Melroe inviting the Kellers to exhibit at the 1958 Minnesota State Fair.

Melroe introduced the four-wheeled M400 model "Skid-Steer Loader" in 1960, and began using "Bobcat" as a trade name for such products in 1962 on the 440-model loader. Les Melroe and advertising agent Lynn Bickett settled on the "Bobcat" name while exchanging name ideas during a drive between Minneapolis and Gwinner. Bickett and Sylvan Melroe developed the "tough, quick, and agile" slogan used in advertising the early loaders.

In 1969, Melroe Manufacturing Company was purchased by Clark Equipment Company which was then purchased by Ingersoll-Rand in 1995. In 2007, Ingersoll-Rand sold Clark Equipment Company to the Doosan Group of South Korea, along with the rest of its construction equipment group for US$4.9 billion. The Clark Equipment Company now does business as Bobcat Company. Bobcat Company owns worldwide trademark registrations for its "Bobcat" name.

In 2017, Bobcat's European headquarters moved in 2017 from Waterloo, Belgium, to Dobříš, Czech Republic, where Bobcat operates one of its European manufacturing plants.

On January 1, 2018, Doosan Infracore and Doosan Bobcat were separated into independent companies, ending a seven-year relationship. In July 2021, Doosan Infracore was acquired by Hyundai Heavy Industries, which paid approximately $722.45 million for a 30% controlling stake in the company. Doosan Infracore will become a subsidiary of the newly created Hyundai Genuine group. However, Bobcat remained a part of Doosan Group, as its majority shareholder has changed to Doosan Heavy Industries on July 1, 2021, before the sale of Doosan Infracore.

== Gallery ==
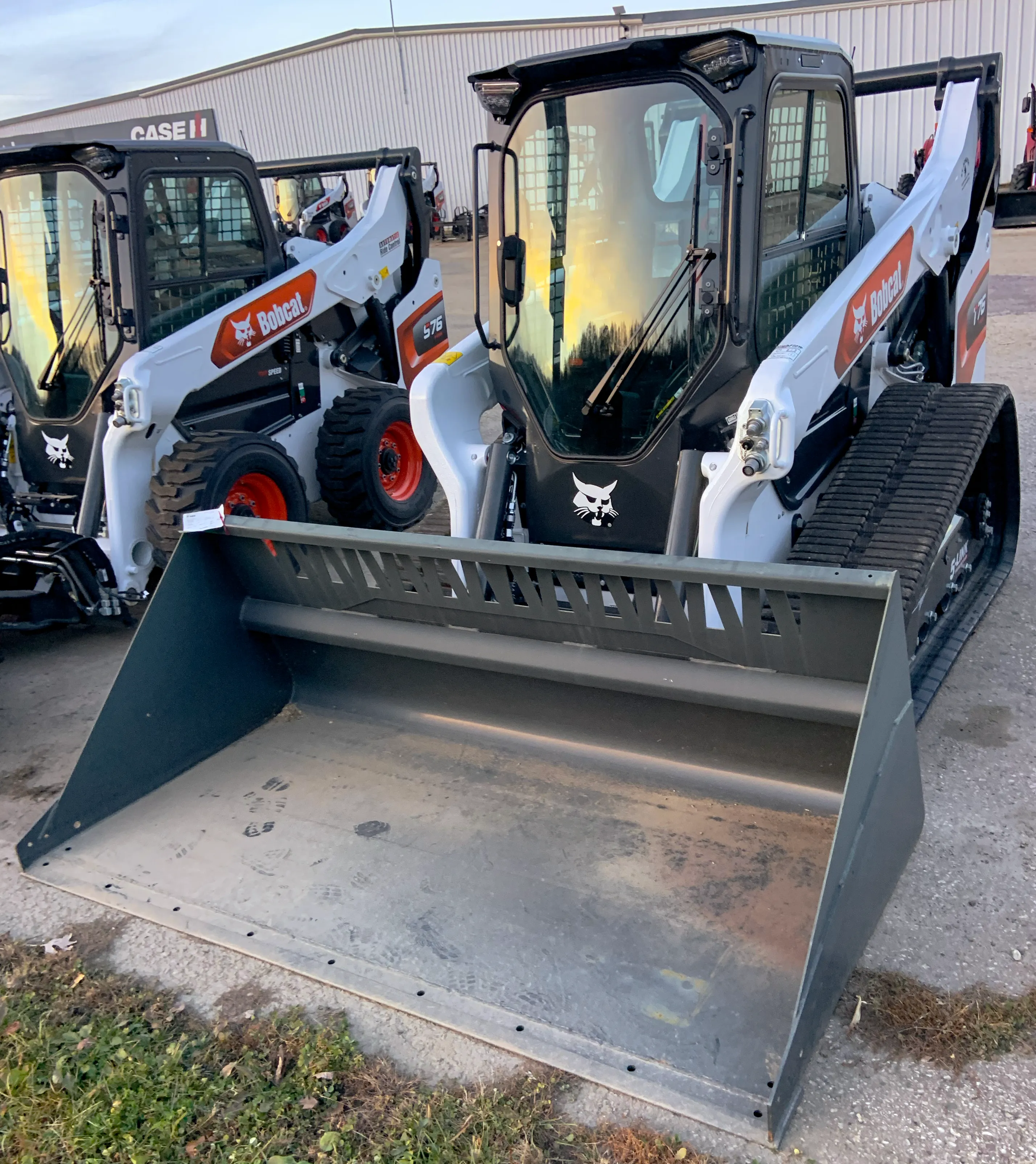
Bobcat tracked loader

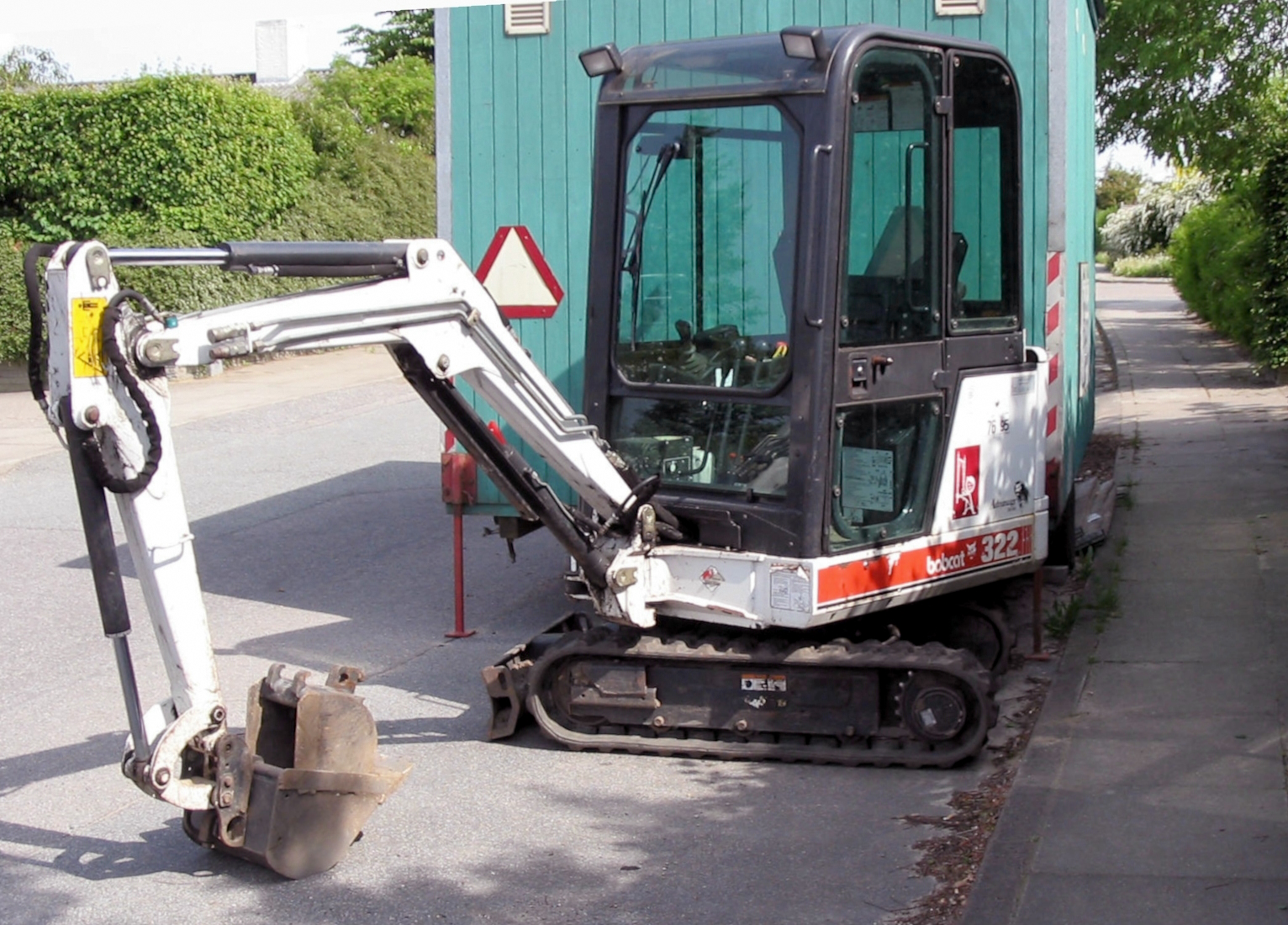
Bobcat compact excavator

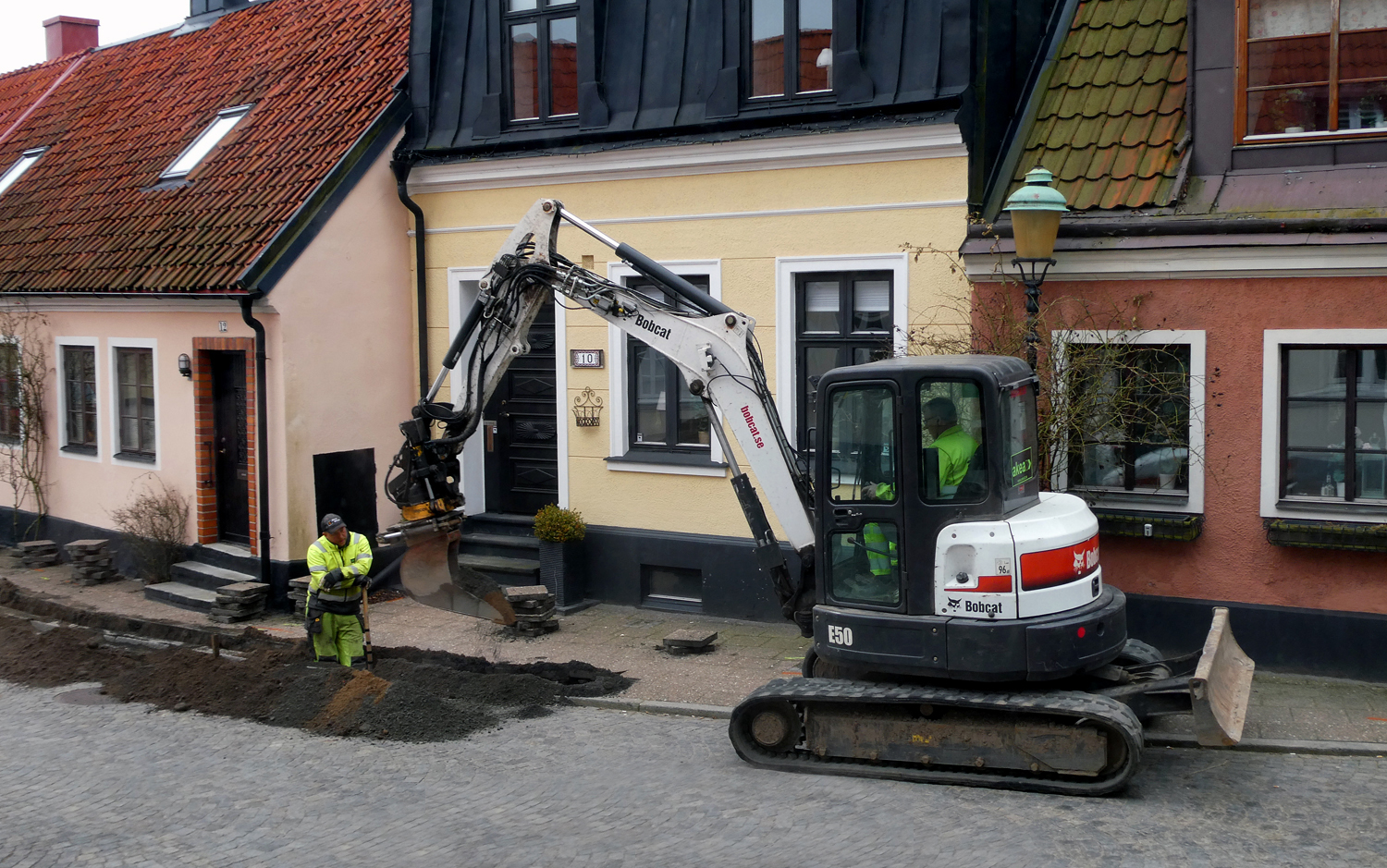
A Bobcat excavator is digging for the laying of a broadband cable in central Ystad
