= Doosan Corporation =

South Korean company

- Type: Public
- Traded as: KRX: 000150
- Founded: December 18, 1933; 92 years ago, in Seoul, South Korea
- Founder: Park Seung-jik
- Headquarters: Seoul, South Korea
- Key people: Park Jeong-won (chairman)
- Parent: Doosan Group
- Subsidiaries: Doosan Enerbility; Doosan Fuel Cell; Doosan Robotics; Doosan Mobility Innovation, etc.
- Website: doosan.com

Doosan Corporation (Korean: 주식회사 두산) is a corporate holding company headquartered in Euljiro 6-ga, Jung-gu, Seoul, South Korea. It is a subsidiary of the Doosan Group conglomerate.

== History ==
- 1896 Park Seung-jik opened Korea's first modern dry goods store, selling cloth.
- 1925 Changed the name of Park Seung-Jik Store Limited to Doosan Store
- 1953 Established the Oriental Brewery and began producing OB beer.
- 1960 Established Dongsan Construction and Engineering (currently Doosan Engineering & Construction)/Acquired Hapdong News Agency (currently Yonhap News)
- 1966 Founded Hanyang Food
- 1967 Founded Yoonhan Machinery (currently Doosan Mecatec)
- 1969 Founded Hankook Bottle and Glass
- 1979 Established Doosan CCK Can Manufacturing
- 1980 Founded OB Seagram
- 1982 Formed OB Bears (currently Doosan Bears)
- 1996 Celebrated 100th anniversary. Announced Doosan Group's new Certificate of Incorporation.
- 1998 Incorporated nine affiliates and re-launched the company as Doosan Corporation in September.
- 2008 Acquired the Chung-Ang University Foundation
- 2008 Sold off the liquor business, and henceforth operated four main businesses, namely, Electro-materials, Fashion, Glonet, and Information & Communication.
- 2009 Doosan Corporation converted into an operating holding company
- 2012 Completed Doosan Corporation Mottrol's Jiangyin plant and Doosan Corporation Electro-Materials' Changshu plant in China
- 2014 Doosan Corporation Fuel Cell established
- 2014 Doosan Corporation Acquired Circuit Foil Luxembourg
- 2015 Doosan Corporation Industrial Vehicle Acquired British Forklift Rental Firm Rushlift
- 2017 Doosan Fuel Cell completes Korea's largest fuel cell factory

== Businesses ==
- Electro-Materials : Doosan Corporation Electronics is a producer of copper clad laminates, a core part of printed circuit boards that are used in electronic products, and is expanding the scope of its business to include the display material business, including OLED materials.
- Industrial Vehicle : Doosan Corporation Industrial Vehicle is a manufacturer of global logistics equipment, as well as engine-type forklifts and electronic forklifts.
- Mottrol : Doosan Corporation Mottrol was the first company in Korea to advance into the hydraulic industry. Based on the technology it has acquired in the production of hydraulic machines for heavy construction equipment and hydraulic parts for the defense industry, it is now a supplier of hydraulic equipment, having expanded its business to produce and supply parts to the ISB (Infrastructure Support Business) sector.
- Digital Innovation : As an information technology (IT) business services unit, Doosan Corporation Information & Communication provides IT services, including development, consulting and operation.
- Fuel Cell Power : Doosan Corporation Fuel Cell Power has a full lineup of products, from power generation to residential use, based on its proprietary fuel cell technologies.
- Retail : The seven-story shopping complex in Dongdaemun
