= Doosan Fuel Cell =

South Korean fuel cell manufacturer

- Native name: 두산퓨얼셀 주식회사
- Type: Public
- Traded as: KRX: 336260
- Industry: Renewable energy industry
- Founded: 18 October 2019; 6 years ago
- Headquarters: Iksan, South Jeolla Province, South Korea
- Products: Fuel cell
- Parent: Doosan
- Website: www.doosanfuelcell.com/kr

Doosan Fuel Cell (Korean: 두산퓨얼셀) is a South Korean company affiliated with Doosan that manufactures fuel cells. Its subsidiary, HyAxiom Motors, produces eco-friendly commercial vehicles.

== History ==
In July 2014, Doosan decided to pursue a merger with FuelCell Power, as the country's residential fuel cell company. FuelCell Power is a residential and small building fuel cell manufacturer founded in 2001 and was listed on the KONEX market of the Korea Exchange in 2013. And the company acquired the assets and operating liabilities of Clearedge power to launch Doosan Fuel Cell America. Doosan Group Chairman Park Yong-man said, "We will develop the fuel cell business into Doosan’s main business in the future."

In January 2018, Doosan Fuel Cell, Hanhwa Energy, and Korea East-West Power established a special purpose corporation, Daesan Green Energy, and built the world’s first by-product hydrogen power plant, the Daesan Hydrogen Fuel Cell Power Plant, in Seosan, South Chungcheong Province. Doosan Fuel Cell supplied 114 units of its 440kW by-product fuel cells (total capacity 50MW) to the power plant and is responsible for its maintenance.

In March 2024, a cell stack for a marine solid oxide fuel cell developed by Doosan Fuel Cell and its subsidiary HyAxiom passed environmental testing by DNV.

== Products ==
Doosan Fuel Cell produces fuel cells, including phosphoric acid fuel cells (PAFCs).

The Iksan plant in Iksan, which began construction in February 2016 and began mass production in January 2017, was expanded in October 2022 to produce up to 300 megawatts (MW) and 680 PAFCs per year. In 2024, a plant capable of producing 50 MW SOFCs was completed in the Saemangeum Industrial Complex in Gunsan, North Jeolla Province.
