= Hans-Elmar Schwing =

German chess player (born 1972)

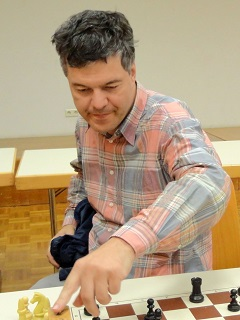
- Schwing in 2014

Personal information
- Born: 23 May 1972 (age 54)

Chess career
- Country: Germany
- Title: FIDE Master (1998)
- FIDE rating: 2305 (December 2021)
- Peak rating: 2350 (February 2017)

Hans-Elmar Schwing (born 23 May 1972) is a German chess player. He was the 1997 Dähne-Pokal winner.

== Chess ==
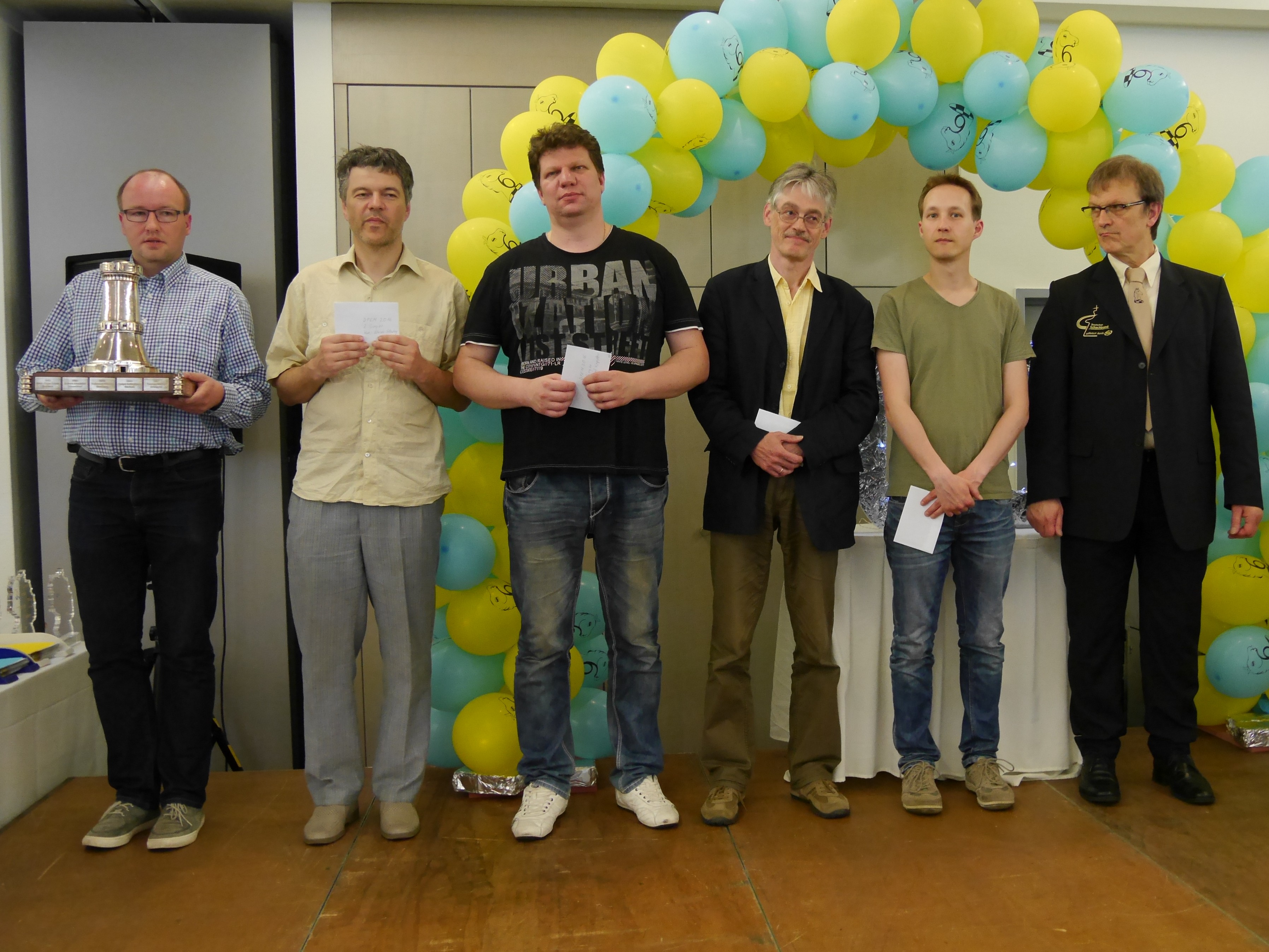
Honor Dähne-Pokal 2016, Hans-Elmar Schwing (Second from left)

As a teenager Hans-Elmar Schwing played at the Baden Individual Youth B in 1989. He participated in several German Cup championships, such as 1997 (Sieger) and 2016 in Halle (Saale). He played in the 2007 Baden Individual Championship in Oberwinden. He participated in the 2010 German Singles Championship in Bad Liebenzell, which was won by Niclas Huschenbeth. At the 2013 Baden championship in Birkenfeld, he came in fourth place and the completion was won by Vyacheslav Ikonnikov.

=== Team competitions ===
In the 1998/99 season, Hans-Elmar played in the 2nd Chess Bundesliga for SVG Saarbrücken. For the Baden Chess Federation, he participated in the 48. Chess Land Competition, Baden against Alsace in the Bürgerhaus Zähringen in 2016. He played team chess for the SGEM Dreisamtal in the Verbandsliga and the Oberliga Baden, which he already did in the 2015/16 season. In addition, he participated in team competitions in France (2010/11 and 2011/12 seasons in the National I, II, III) and in Switzerland. In Switzerland he played in the 1st League Northwest in 2006 for the Basel SG and took 6 out of 7 in the SGM 2012/13 – 1st Regionalliga in 2012/13.

=== Miscellaneous ===
He hold the chess title of FIDE Master and is a member of the SGEM Dreisamtal. His highest Elo rating was 2350 in February 2017.

Elo development
View chart definition.
