= Schwing (company) =

German manufacturer of concrete pumps and mixers

- Company type: Private
- Industry: Concrete mixer
- Founded: 1934; 92 years ago
- Founder: Friedrich Wilhelm Schwing
- Headquarters: Herne, North Rhine-Westphalia, Germany
- Area served: Worldwide
- Parent: XCMG
- Website: www.schwing.com

Schwing GmbH is a German manufacturer of mobile and stationary concrete pumps and truck mixers, headquartered in Herne, as well as the parent company of Schwing Stetter in Memmingen. The business group is the world's largest concrete pump manufacturer. The company employs more than 3300 people worldwide in seven countries. In addition, there are individual distribution companies in more than 100 countries.

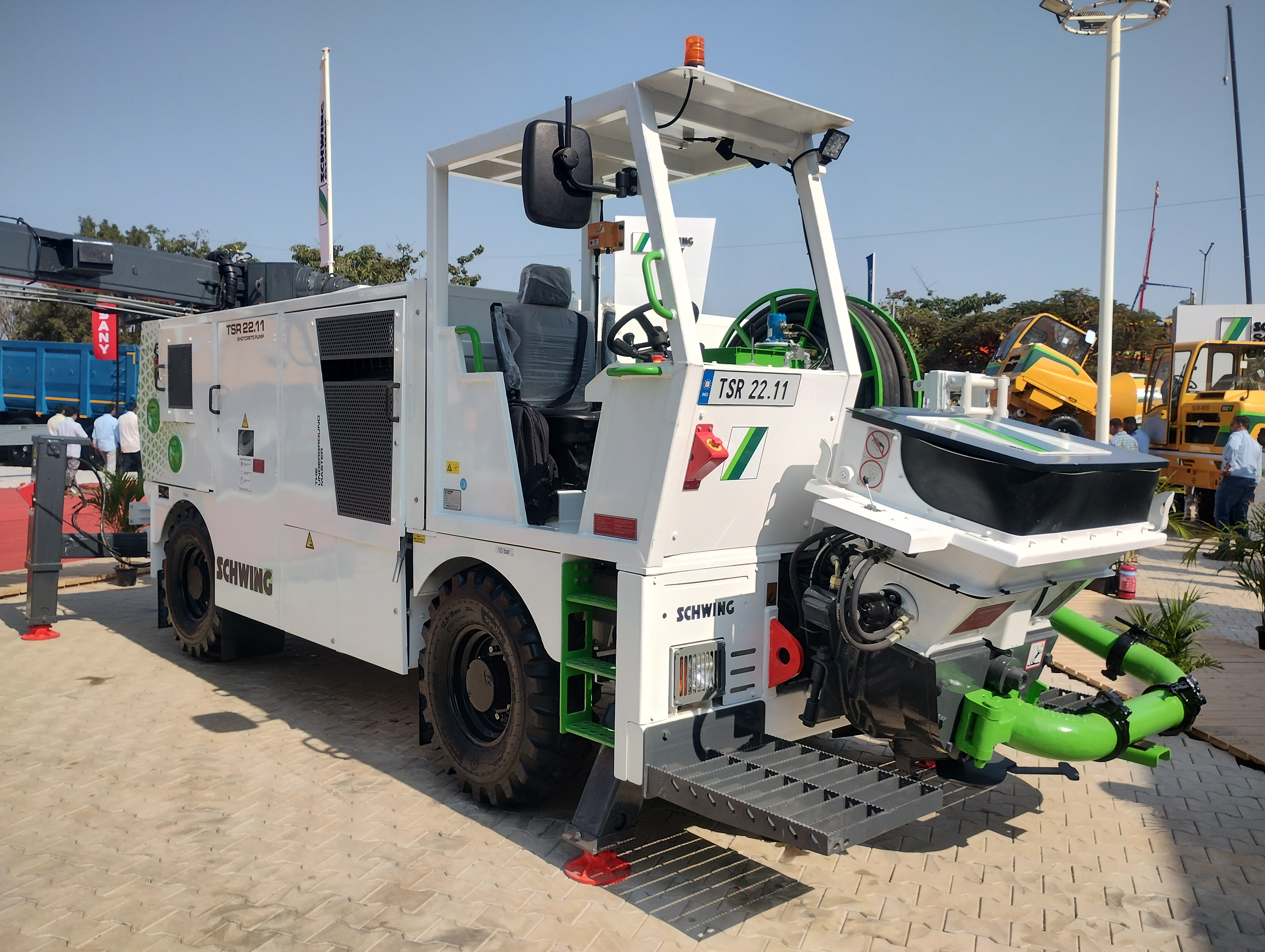
Schwing shotcrete pump machine at EXCON 2025, BIEC

== History ==
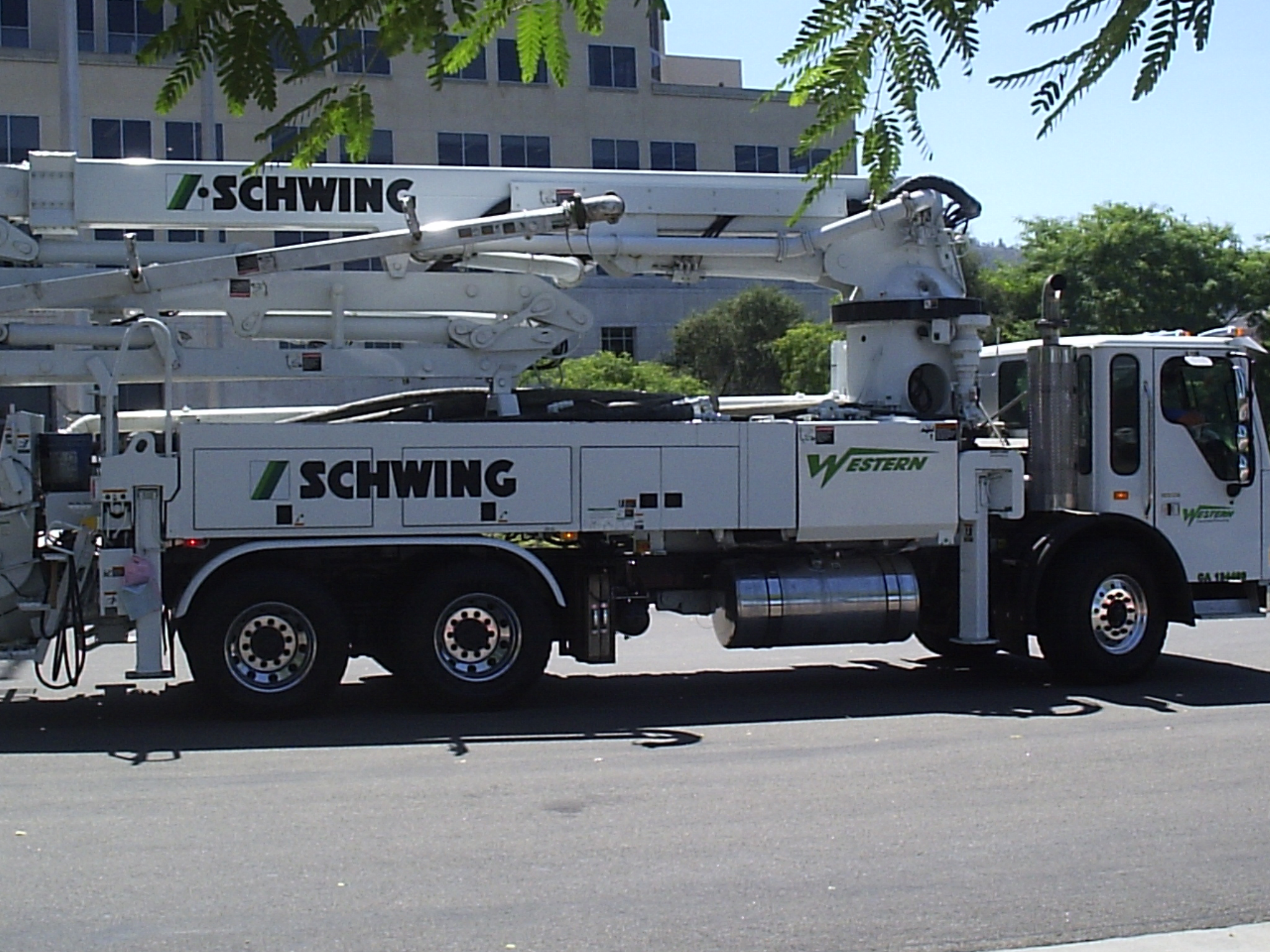
Schwing Concrete pump

The Schwing Group was founded as a medium-sized enterprise on 17 March 1934, by Friedrich Wilhelm Schwing (* 1909; † 1992), a locksmith from Wanne-Eickel. In 1957, Schwing built the world's first oil-hydraulic two-cylinder concrete pump. Starting in 1964, the company also built the first large concrete mixers. In 1965, the company launched its first concrete pump which was mounted on a vehicle, and improved it in 1968 with the addition of a distribution mast. In 1973, the company built a high-speed concrete pump vehicle with a 45-meter-wide large distribution mast, an outstanding innovation at that time. In 1976, Schwing launched the first residual concrete processing plant on the market.

After the company founder handed over the company management to his two sons in 1980, they acquired the company Stetter GmbH in Memmingen in 1982, which produced truck mixers. The company's market domicile and the company's portfolio expanded. The company was now able to offer combined mixers with a concrete pump mounted on it and developed into a market leader.

At the end of the nineties there was a dispute between the owners, the company was about to sell to an American company. With the help of banks, a state guarantee and private assets, Gerhard Schwing succeeded in buying his brothers shares. Until 3 October 2013, he was the sole Managing Director of the GmbH. In 2012 Schwing was taken over by the Chinese producer XCMG for €300 million.

== Other companies in the group ==
(Sorted by year)

- since 1971 SCHWING GmbH, St. Stefan (Austria)
- since 1974 SCHWING Hydraulik Elektronik GmbH, Herne (Deutschland)
- since 1974 SCHWING America Inc., White Bear Township (USA)
- since 1976 SCHWING Equipamentos Industriais Ltda., São Paulo (Brazil)
- since 1982 SCHWING-Stetter S.A., Souffelweyersheim (France)
- since 1982 SCHWING-Stetter B.V., Raamsdonksveer (Netherlands)
- since 1982 SCHWING-Stetter Baumaschinen Ges.mbH, Vienna (Austria)
- since 1993 Puschkiner Baumaschinenwerk, Saint Petersburg (Russia)
- since 1993 SCHWING Stetter Ostrava s.r.o., Ostrava (Czech Republic)
- since 1994 SCHWING Shanghai Machinery Company Ltd., Shanghai (China)
- since 1997 SCHWING GmbH Korea, Seoul (Korea)
- since 1998 M/s SCHWING-Stetter India Pvt. Ltd., Chennai (India)
- since 1999 SCHWING-Stetter Skandinavien AB, Mölndal (Sweden)
