= Schwing Stetter =

German concrete mixer and transporter company

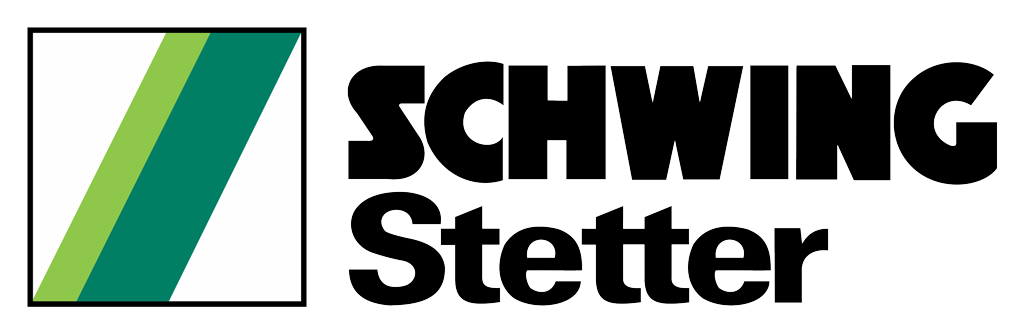

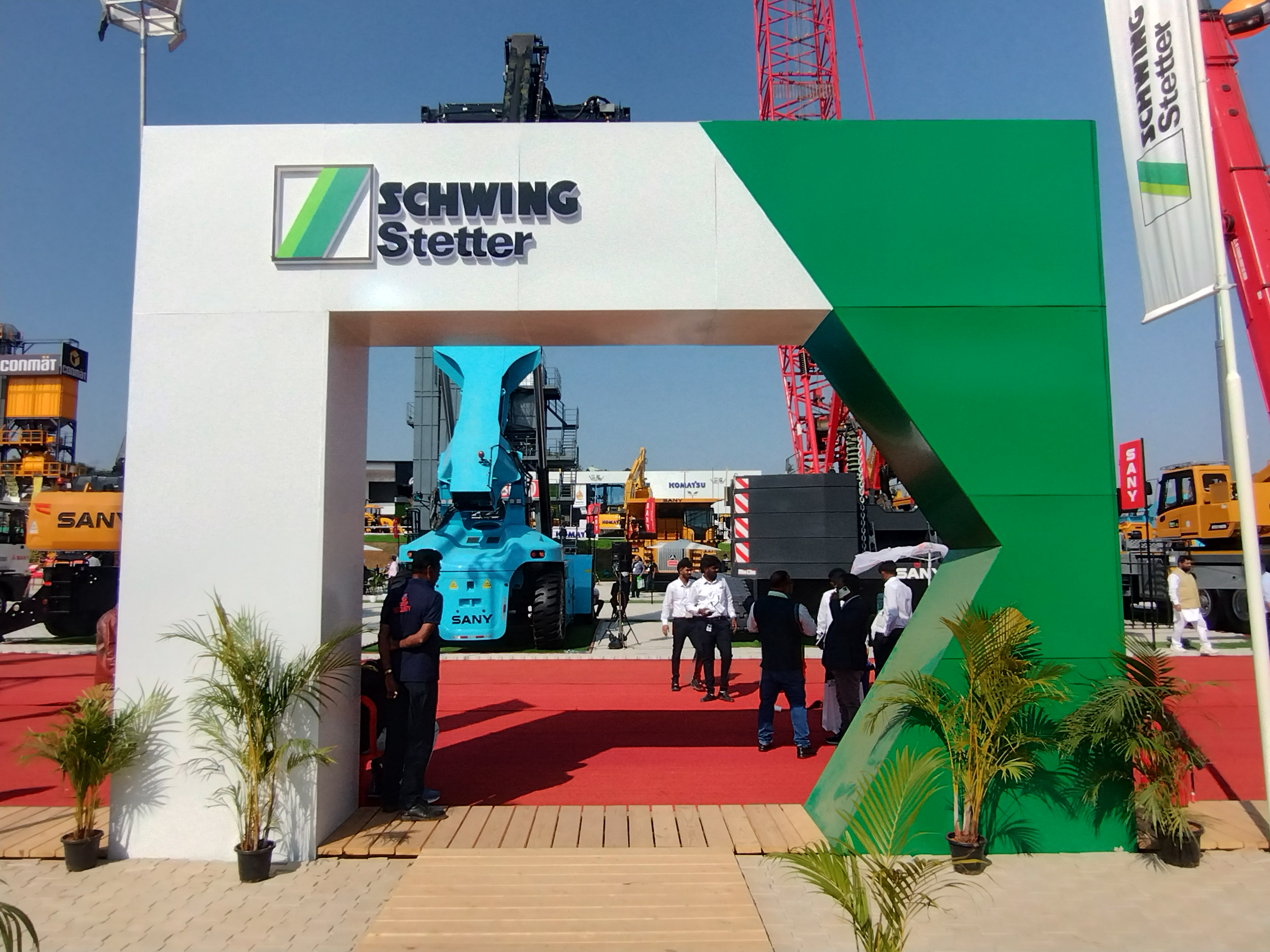
- Schwing Stetter at EXCON 2025, BIEC
- Founded: 1945
- Headquarters: Memmingen, Germany
- Parent: Schwing
- Website: schwing-stetter.com

Schwing Stetter GmbH, headquartered in Memmingen, Germany, is a manufacturer of concrete mixers and concrete transport systems. With over 600 employees at the Memmingen site, Schwing Stetter is one of the largest employers in the city. In 1982, it was taken over by the company Schwing and integrated into the Group as an independent company. Stetter is currently the world's largest producer of truck mixers.

== History ==
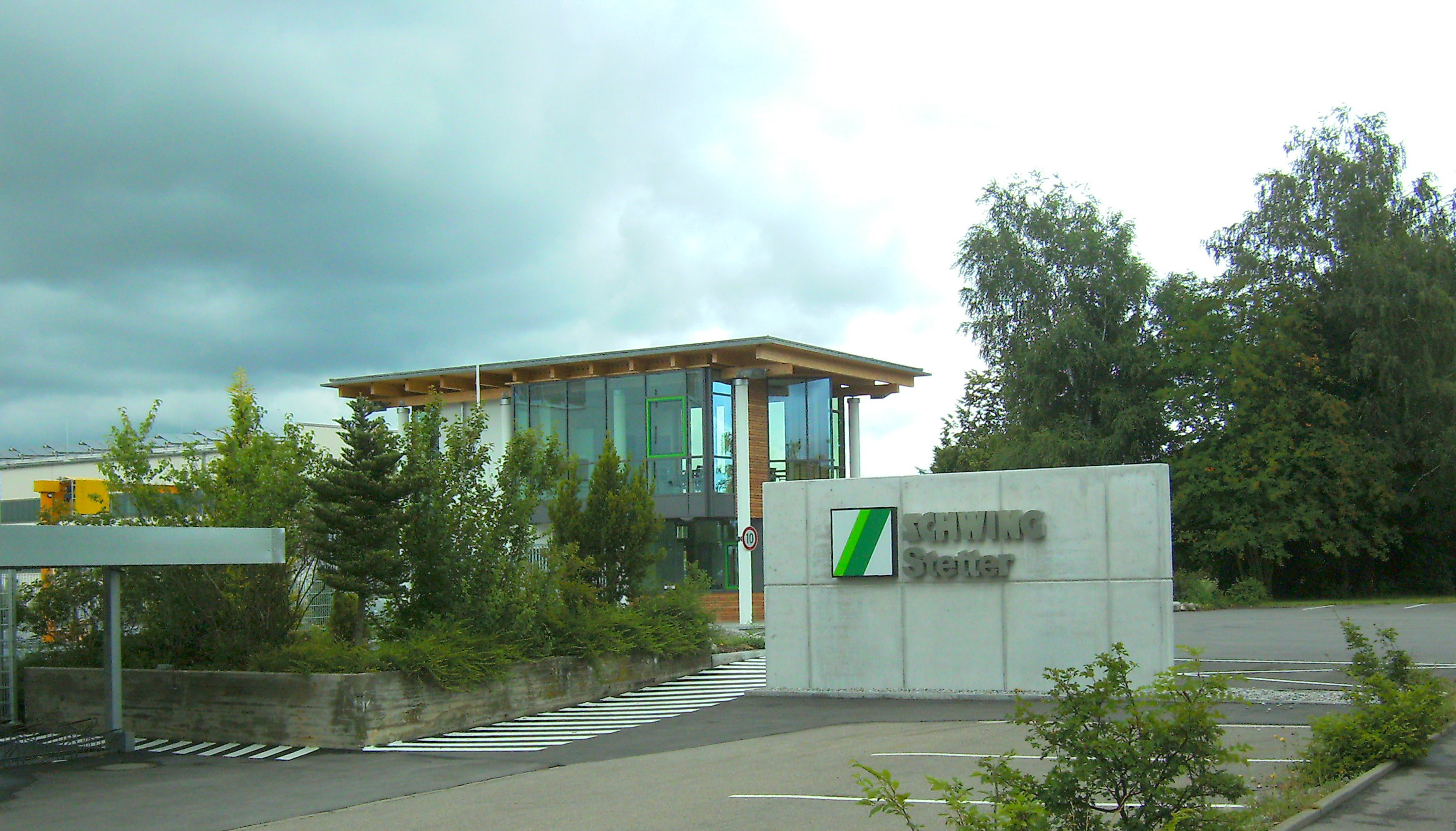
Schwing Stetter Memmingen

The head office is located in Memmingen. In 1945, the company Stetter, which specialized in concrete mixers, was developed from a former forge. The first transport concrete mixer on a Magirus-Deutz truck chassis was presented at the Hanover Fair in 1958. Through developments such as integrated hydraulic drive, direct drive, special drum shape, design of spirals in the outlet area and integrated oil cooler and filter systems, Stetter GmbH secured an important status in the industry. Already at the end of the sixties, they were the market leader in the branch and more than 50,000 transport mixers were sold between 1958 and 1994. The concrete mixers are built on the chassis of over 15 different vehicle manufacturers in up to 300 different designs. Adaptation to country-specific guidelines and working methods make this diversity necessary.

In 1982, the company was taken over by Schwing. Until this time, Schwing produced construction winches, construction hoists, mobile tower cranes, universal climbing cranes, earthmoving machines, concrete and mortar mixers and saw a sensible addition to its product range at Stetter GmbH. The company was chosen as a business form. The existing divisions at the Memmingen site were retained and business there was continued as usual. This way, Stetter GmbH retained its own research and development department specifically for the products on the market, the personnel department and its own management.

== Products ==
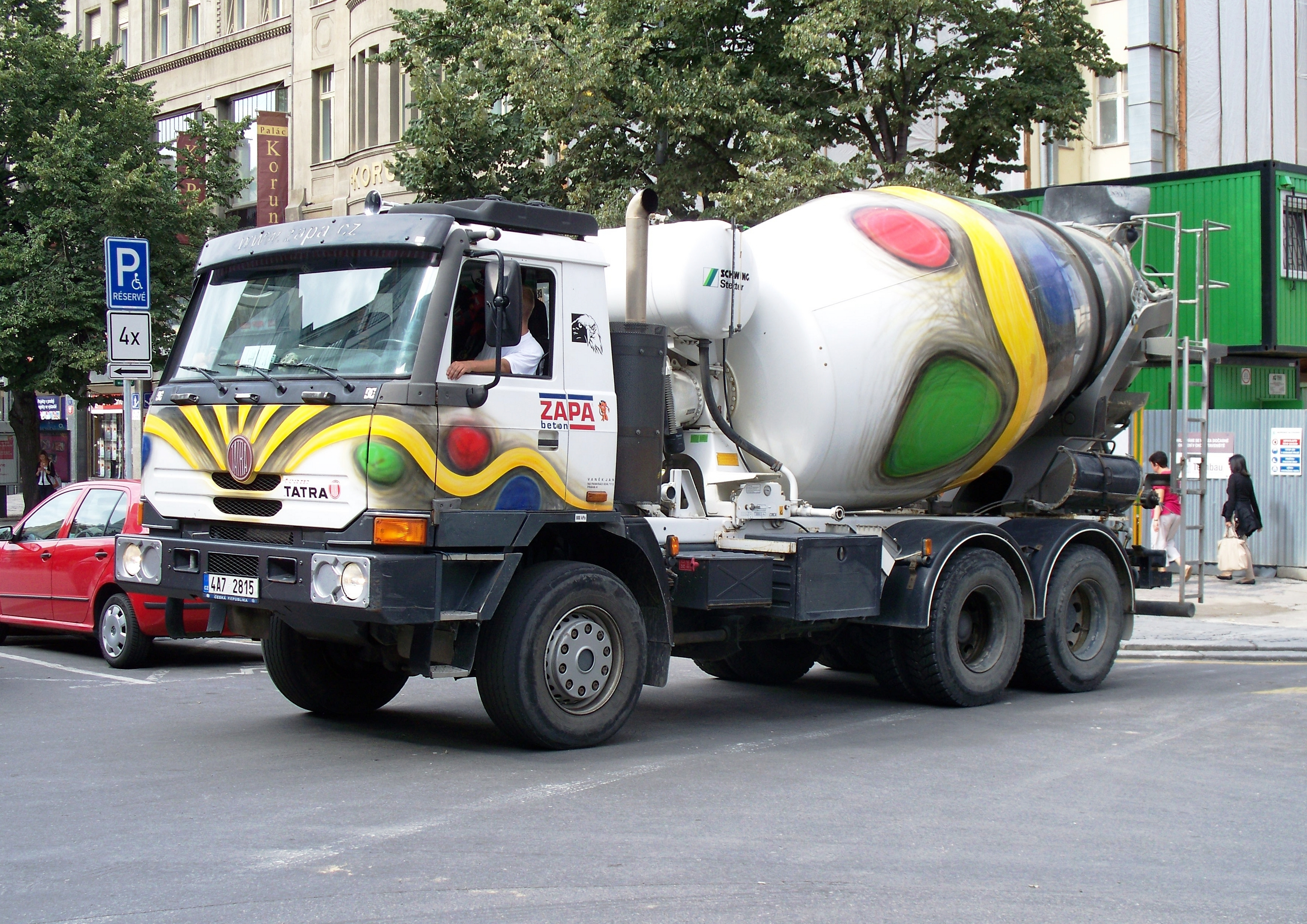
A concrete mixer of Schwing Stetter on the cab chassis of a Tatra 815

The company manufactures concrete mixers, mobile and solid concrete mixing plants and residual concrete processing plants at the Memmingen plant. Stetter truck mixers are offered in four different classes, BasicLine as standard, LightLine as a particularly low-weight mixer, Heavy DutyLine for heavy duty use and for particularly high loading is the trailer line. With the concrete mixers, the concrete is fully blended in the stated composition and is loaded directly. Due to the increased environmental awareness of the population and industry, for cost reduction and official regulations, it was necessary to develop processing plants for residual concrete.

== Branch offices ==
In Austria, France, Turkey, Russia, China, India and the USA.

== Media gallery ==
Schwing Stetter at EXCON 2025, BIEC
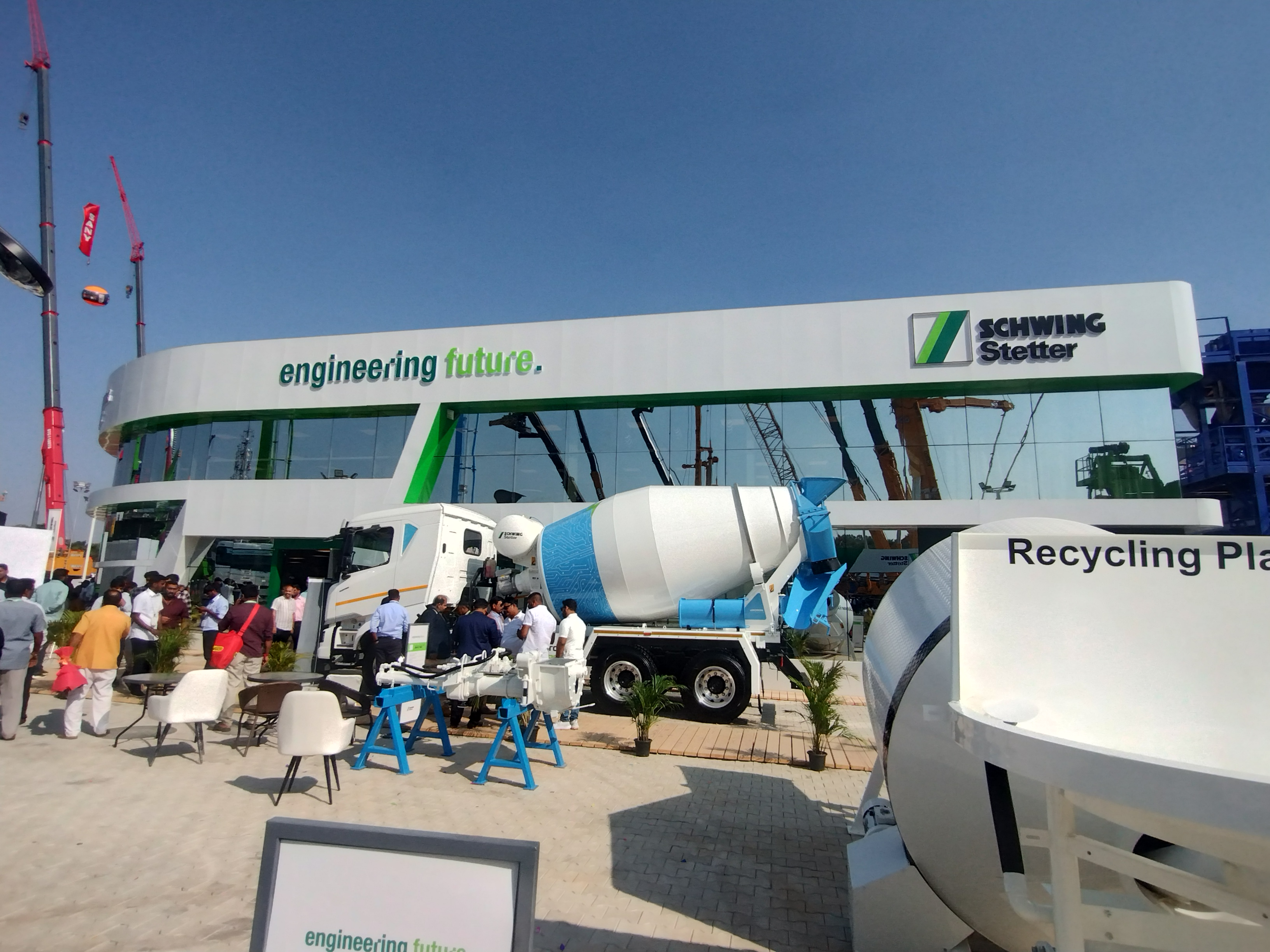

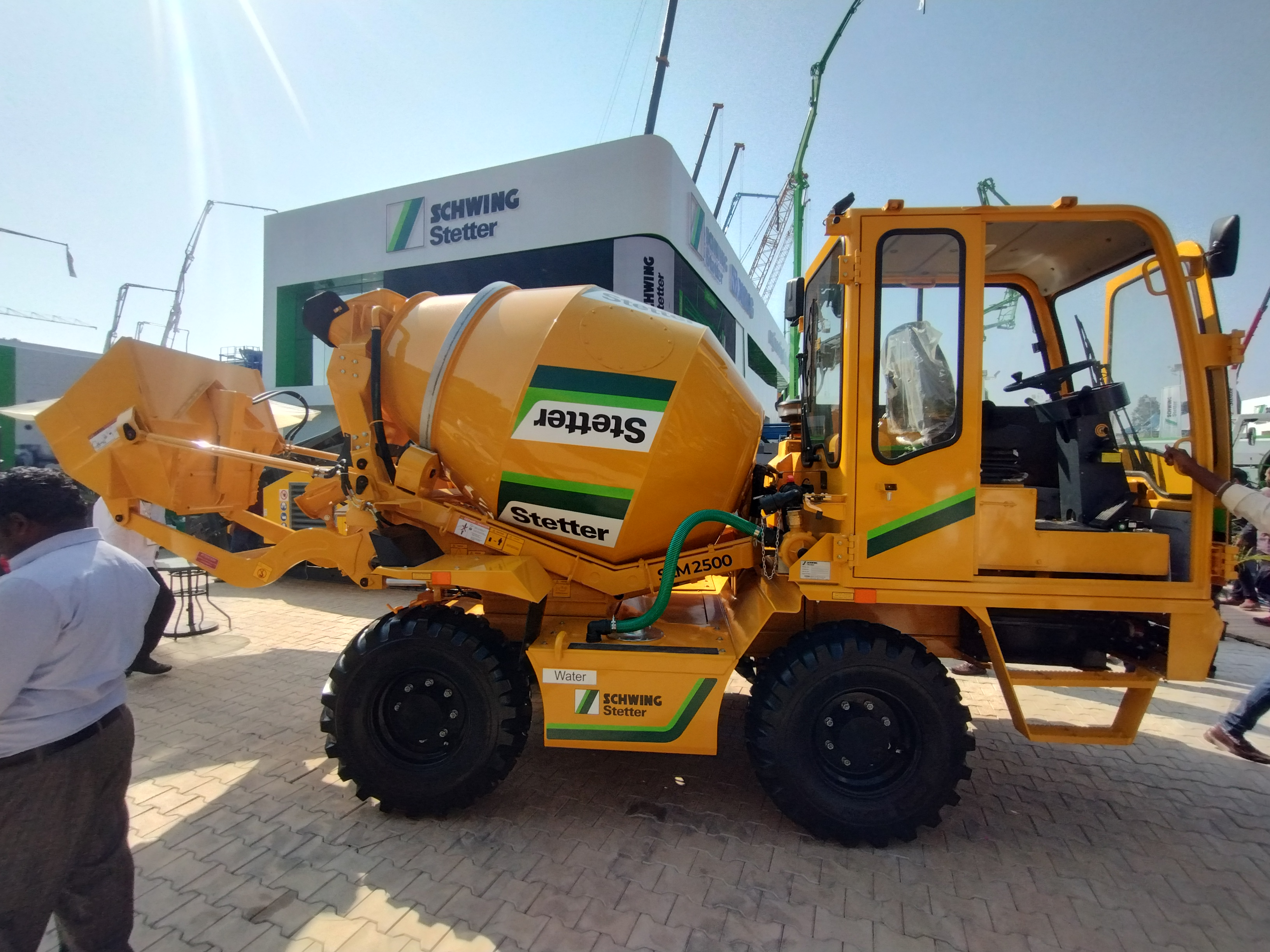

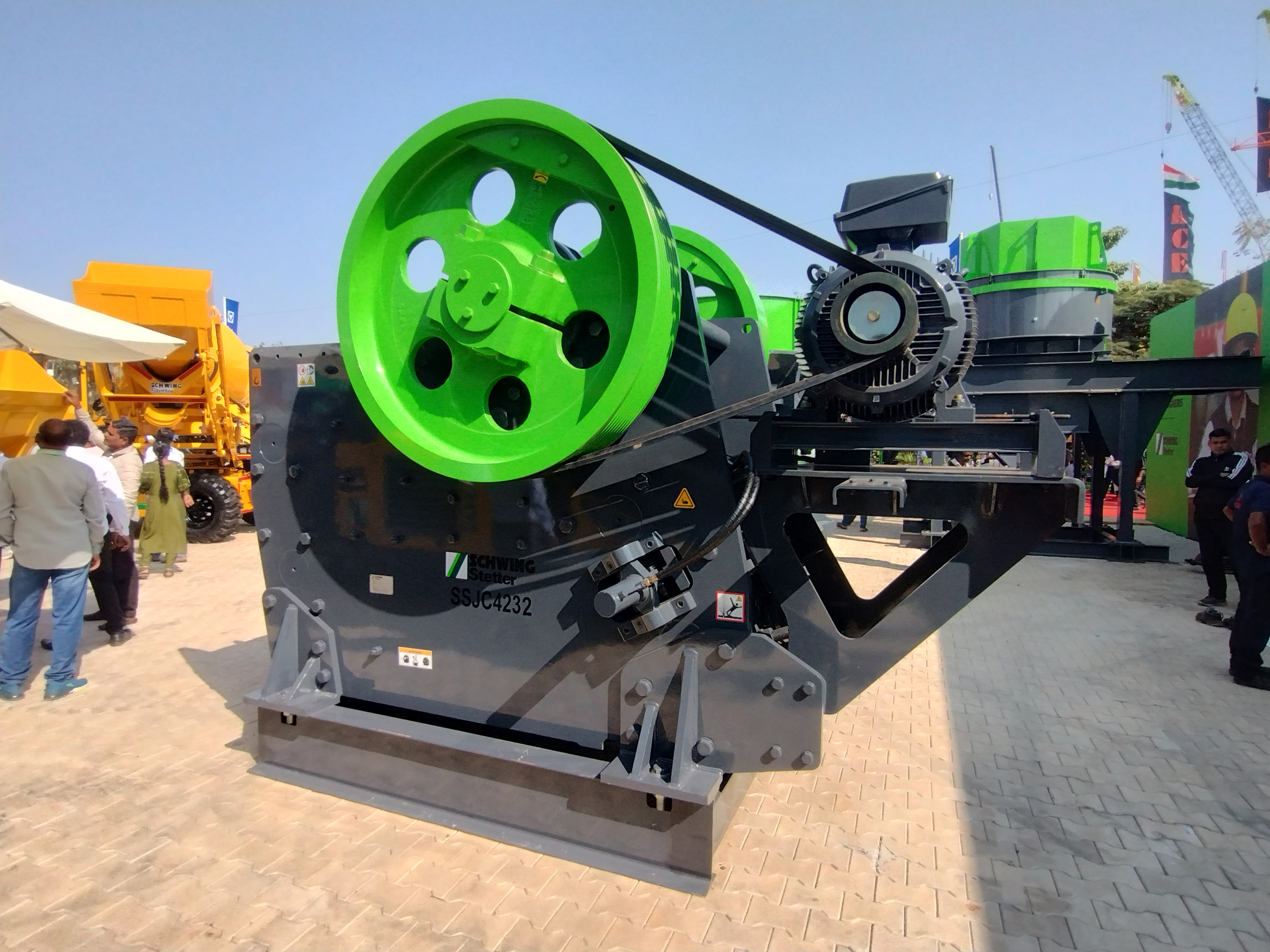

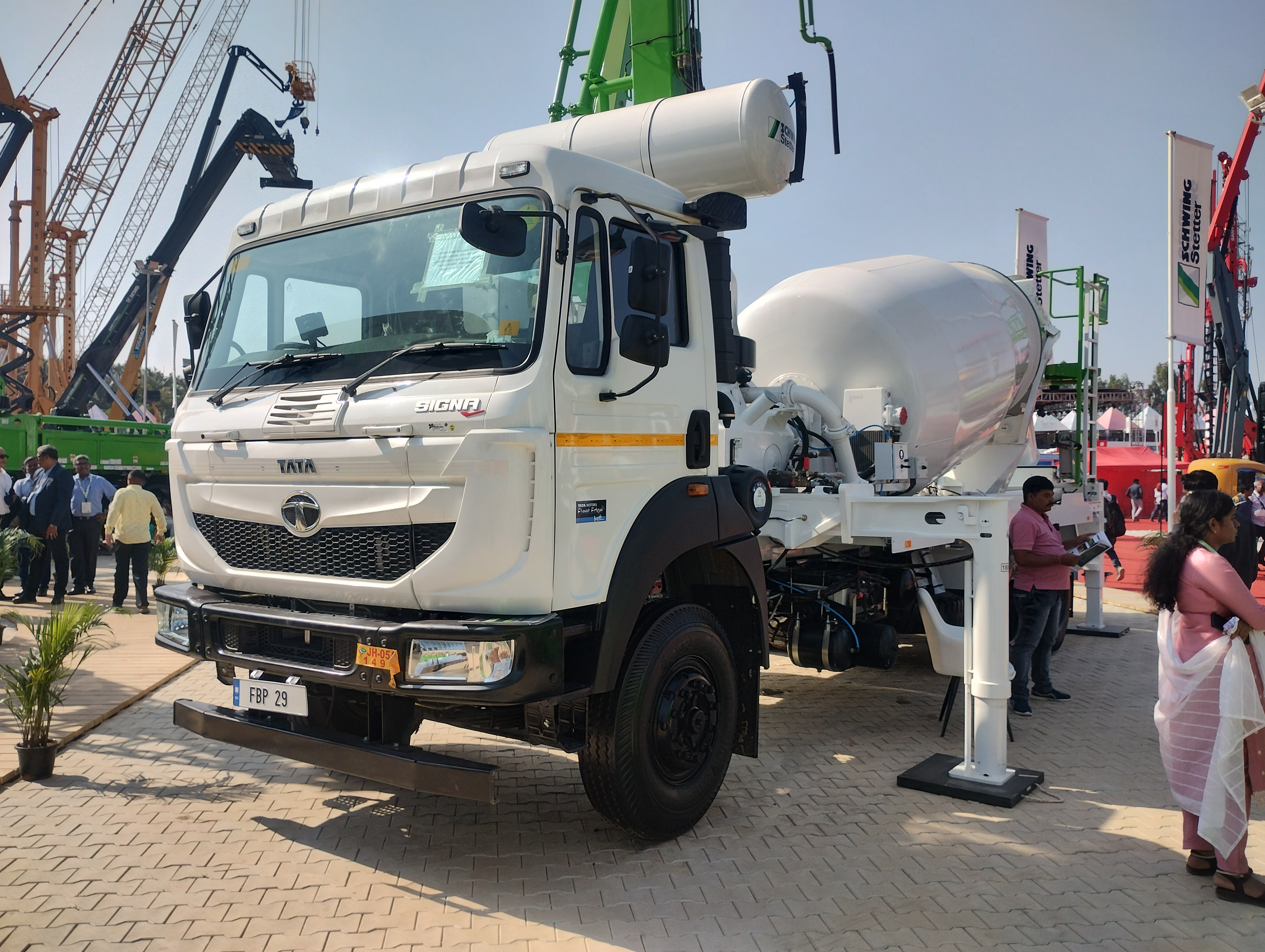

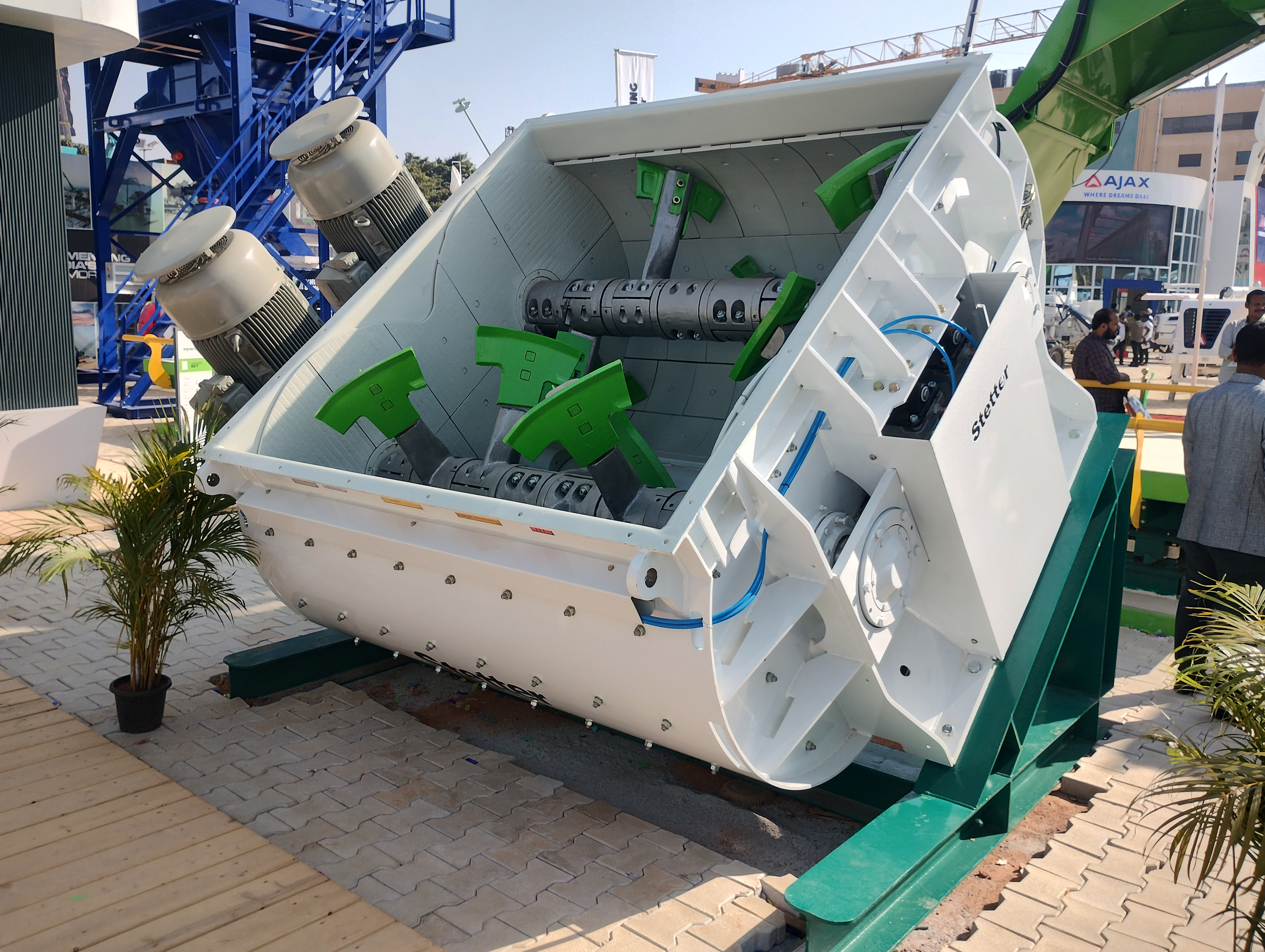
