= Doosan Group =

South Korean conglomerate company

Coordinates: 37.568783°N 127.009933°E

- Formerly: Daewoo Heavy Industries & Machinery; Doosan Infracore
- Type: Public
- Traded as: KRX: 000150
- Industry: Conglomerate
- Founded: 1896; 130 years ago
- Founder: Park Seung-jik
- Headquarters: Doosan Tower 18-12, Euljiro 6-ga, Jung-gu, Seoul, South Korea
- Key people: Park Jeong-won, Chairman
- Products: Power Plant, Desalination Plant, Construction Equipment, hydrogen production & utilization technology, Drones, Collaborative Robots, etc.
- Subsidiaries: Doosan Corporation; Doosan Enerbility; Doosan Fuel Cell America
- Website: doosan.com

Doosan Group (Korean: 두산그룹; Hanja: 斗山그룹) is a South Korean multinational conglomerate corporation. In 2009, the corporation was placed in the Fortune Global 500 index. It is the parent company of Bobcat and Škoda Power. Doosan Group is the oldest running company in South Korea and was ranked as one of the world's top 10 largest heavy equipment manufacturers in 2018.

== History ==
The Doosan Group was founded in 1896. The company began as the Park Seung Jik Store in 1896 in Baeogai (now Jongno 4-ga, Seoul).

In 1991, tons of phenol leaked from a Doosan Electro-Materials plant into the Nakdong River, giving its water a stench. Environmental inspectors and the plant's managers were imprisoned.

Doosan has developed into a multinational conglomerate. The company's acquisitions include Doosan Heavy Industries & Construction in 2001, Koryeo Industrial Development in 2004 and Doosan Infracore (formerly Daewoo Heavy Industries & Machinery in 1967) in 2005.

In 2006, Doosan acquired the boiler engineering company Mitsui Babcock UK (renamed Doosan Babcock) and Kvaerner IMGB, the largest casting and forging company in Romania. In 2007, Doosan acquired the construction machinery company Bobcat USA. After the absorption of Bobcat USA into Doosan Infracore, the Doosan Group became the world's seventh largest supplier of construction machinery. Doosan currently has 41,400 employees in 38 countries. In 2011, Doosan renewed its licensing agreement with Wärtsilä-Sulzer for the construction of large marine propulsion engines, for which it is one of the world leaders. On 1 January 2018, Doosan and Doosan Bobcat were separated into independent companies. In July 2021, Doosan Infracore was acquired by Hyundai Heavy Industries, which paid approximately $722.45 million for a 30% controlling stake in the company. Doosan Infracore is planned to become a subsidiary of the newly created Hyundai Genuine group. As of 2023, Doosan has rebranded as Develon.

== Companies ==
Doosan Corporation (Holding Company)

- Doosan Corporation Electro-Materials supplies the main materials for polychlorinated biphenyls, a core part for electronics, including copper clad laminate and OLED materials (illuminating and common layer for fluorescence phosphorescence.)
- Doosan Corporation Digital Innovation provides customers including Doosan affiliates with information technology consulting, system setup, business system operation and information technology infrastructure operation.
- Doosan Corporation Fuel Cell Power: Doosan Corporation Fuel Cell has a full lineup of products, from power generation to residential use, based on its proprietary fuel cell technologies.
- Doosan Corporation Retail: Doosan Tower is a shopping mall with more than 550 fashion stores, attracting 20 million visitors each year.

Affiliates

- Doosan Enerbility, established in 1962, develops thermal power plant, nuclear power plant, seawater desalination plant, casting and forging and construction in the Middle East, Asia, Europe and North America with a total of $9.6 billion in revenue in 2012. Doosan has built over 400 nuclear, thermal and combined-cycle power plants. Doosan has proprietary technologies for all three major desalination types: multi-stage flash, multi-effect distillation, and reverse osmosis. The company has acquired Romania's largest casting and forging manufacturer, the boiler manufacturer Mitsui Babcock, and a Czech-based turbine manufacturer, Skoda Power. It has also established desalination research and development centers in Tampa, U.S., Damman, Saudi Arabia and Birmingham, UK.
- Doosan Industrial Vehicle: A manufacturer of global logistics equipment, as well as engine-type forklifts and electronic forklifts.
- Doosan Fuel Cell: Doosan bought U.S. fuel cell maker ClearEdge Power, a stationary fuel cell manufacturer based in Silicon Valley.
- American Engineering Services (currently, Doosan Hydro Technology) in 2005.
- IMGB (currently, Doosan IMGB) in 2006. Doosan IMGB is the largest casting and forging company in Europe with headquarters in Romania.
- Doosan Babcock Energy in 2006
- Doosan Bobcat in 2007
- Advanced Technology Lubben in 2008, located in Lübben, outside Berlin (Germany) and has the original technology to support the production of material handling equipment for warehouses and airports.
- Doosan Robotics: Manufacturing industrial robots
- Škoda Power in 2009, a manufacturer and supplier of Skoda design steam turbines from 5 MW to 1,200 MW, machine halls and of customer services for fossil and nuclear power plants, combined cycles, co-generation and incineration plants.
- Enpure: in 2012 Doosan Heavy Industries & Construction acquired Enpure, a U.K. based water/wastewater treatment company with core technologies and patents for removing foreign matters from source water and seawater, as well as water/wastewater treatment and design of desalination facilities.
- Oricom provides services for marketing brands including planning, creative, brand consulting, media, promotion and online marketing.
- Hancomm is a representative general advertisement agency in Korea, which has been leading the development and growth of the advertisement industry along with Oricom.
- Doosan Bears, formed in January 1982, the first year of the professional league in Korea, was the country's first professional baseball team.
- Doosan Cuvex operates the Ladena golf club in Chuncheon, Korea.
- Doosan Magazine was in 1996 the first fashion magazine publisher in Korea, known as the local licensee for GQ, Vogue, Allure and W.

Auxiliary Organizations

- Yonkang Foundation, established in 1978 in honor of the company's first chairperson the late Yonkang Too Pyung Park, is involved in scholarships, R&D financing, overseas training for teachers, educational welfare and sharing books.
- Doosan Art Center supports young artists in its facilities, including Yonkang Hall, Space111 and Doosan Gallery.
- DBRI (Doosan Business Research Institute): The Doosan Leadership Institute hosts educational programs including workshops, forums, and seminars for employees of the group.

== See also ==
- Doosan Corporation
- Economy of South Korea
- List of South Korean companies
