= Chung Mong-koo =

South Korean business magnate (born 1938)

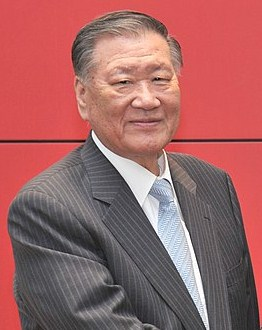
- Chung Mong-koo in 2015
- Born: 19 March 1938 (age 88); Tsūsen-gun, Korea, Empire of Japan
- Education: Hanyang University (B.S.)
- Occupation: Business magnate
- Title: Honorary Chairman of Hyundai Motor Group
- Spouse: Lee Jung-Hwa (Deceased)
- Children: 4
- Awards: Van Fleet Award (2009) Induction into Automotive Hall of Fame 2020/2021

Korean name
- Hangul: 정몽구
- Hanja: 鄭夢九
- RR: Jeong Monggu
- MR: Chŏng Monggu

Chung Mong-koo (Korean: 정몽구; born 19 March 1938) is a South Korean business magnate. He is the honorary chairman and former CEO of Hyundai Motor Group, Korea's second largest chaebol that manages 54 subsidiaries including Hyundai Motor, Kia Motors, and Hyundai Steel. He started his career in 1970, joining the engineering & construction division of the group. Chung succeeded his father, Chung Ju-yung, the founder of the conglomerate known as the Hyundai Group. When the conglomerate split into several parts in 1999, Chung Mong-koo took over the Hyundai Motor division. He is the eldest surviving son of Chung Ju-yung's eight sons.

He is among the richest people in South Korea. In December 2024, Forbes estimated his net worth at US$4 billion and ranked him 5th richest person in the country.

He was convicted of embezzlement and breach of fiduciary duty in February 2007, but was given a suspended sentence and was fully pardoned by President Lee Myung-bak.

== Education ==
- Graduated, Kyungbock High School
- Bachelor of Science in industrial engineering, Hanyang University

== Professional experience ==
- 2020–present: Honorary Chairman of Hyundai Motor Co. & Kia Motors Corp.
- 2000–2020: Chairman & CEO of Hyundai Motor Co. & Kia Motors Corp.
- 1996–1998: Chairman of Hyundai Group
- 1987–1998: CEO, Hyundai Motor Service
- 1986: CEO, Incheon Iron & Steel
- 1981: CEO, Hyundai Pipe
- 1977: CEO, Hyundai Precision & Industry
- 1970: started his career by joining Hyundai Engineering & Construction

He also owns INNOCEAN Worldwide, an ad & marketing agency, with his eldest daughter Chung Sung-yi.

=== Management ===
Chung is described as a "vigorous septuagenarian" who comes to work at 6:30 a.m. and "personally heads monthly quality reviews with senior executives".

Although he only holds 5.2% of Hyundai Motor's stock, Chung "wields disproportionately strong control" and is able to control its board thanks to a complex corporate governance arrangements in which Hyundai Motor owns 34% of Kia, which owns 16.9% of Mobis, which in turn owns 20.8% of Hyundai Motor. This means that "because the companies essentially control each other, no outside shareholder is strong enough to name board members".

=== 2007 embezzlement conviction ===
In 2006, he and his family were targeted by the Seoul Supreme Prosecutor's Office as part of an investigation into embezzling 100 billion won ($106 million) from Hyundai to create slush funds to bribe officials. Despite a travel ban, Chung left South Korea in April 2006. Chung was arrested on 28 April 2006 on charges related to embezzlement and other corruption.

On 5 February 2007 he was convicted of embezzlement and breach of fiduciary duty for selling securities to his son Chung Eui-sun at below-market prices. He was sentenced to three years in prison. Chung remained free on bail while he appealed the sentence. On September 6, 2007, Chief Judge Lee Jae-hong ruled to suspend the sentence of Chung Mong-koo (in consideration of the huge economic impact of imprisonment), ordering instead of a 3-year jail term, community service and a $1 billion donation to charity.

The trial was seen as "a victory for transparency and rule of law in South Korea", but on August 15, 2008, South Korean President Lee Myung-bak granted him a special pardon to allow Chung to continue to contribute to the development of Hyundai Motor Group as well as the Korean economy.

== Awards and honors ==
- 2020: Automotive Hall of Fame
- 2009: James A. Van Fleet Award, The Korea Society
- 2008–present: Honorary Chairman of the Organizing Committee for the Expo 2012 in Yeosu
- 2004: Inchon Award
- 2001: Awarded Distinguished Service Citation by Detroit's Automotive Hall of Fame
- 1997–present: Honorary Vice President of World Archery Federation
- 1986–1997: Chairman of Asia Archery Association
- 1985–1997: Chairman of Korea Archery Association

== Family ==
Chung family tree

Han Seong-sil 한성실 ?	Chung Bong-sik 정봉식 ?
Yung	Byun Joong-seok 변중석; 1921–2007	Chung Ju-yung 정주영; 1915–2001	Kim Kyung-hee 김경희; 1953–	Park Byeong-im 박병임; 1928–2015	Chung Soon-yung 정순영; 1922–2005	Park Young-ja 박영자; 1936–	Chung Se-yung 정세영; 1928–2005	Jo Eun-ju 조은주; 1936–	Chung Sang-yung 정상영; 1936–2021
(영)
(Note: Given name terminates in -yung (영) for males and females in this generation)	Kim Wol-gye 김월계; 1923–2003	Chung In-yung 정인영; 1920–2006	Chung Hee-yung 정희영; 1925–2015	Kim Young-joo 김영주; 1920–2010	Jang Jeong-ja 장정자; 1935–	Chung Shin-yung 정신영; 1931–62
Chung Mong-pil (Note: Married to Lee Yang-ja (이양자; 1943–90)) 정몽필; 1934–82	Chung Chung-in (Grace) 정정인; 1979–	Chung Chung-im (Elizabeth) 정정임; 1981–	Chung Hyeong-suk 정형숙; 1951–74	Chung Moon-sook 정문숙; 1947–	Kim Yun-su 김윤수; 1946–	Chung Sook-young (Note: Married to Prof. Noh Kyung-soo (노경수; 1954–)) 정숙영; 1960–	Chung Il-kyung 정일경; 1960–	Chung Mong-hyuk 정몽혁; 1961–
Mong	Chung Mong-koo (Note: Married to Lee Jung-hwa (이정화; 1939–2009)) 정몽구; 1938–	Chung Mong-woo (Note: Married to Lee Haeng-ja (이행자; 1945–)) 정몽우; 1945–90	Chung Mong-yoon (Note: Married to Kim Hye-young (김혜영; 1961–)) 정몽윤; 1955–	Chung Mong-guk (Note: Married to Lee Yoon-hee (이윤희; 1954–)) 정몽국; 1953–	Chung Mong-sun 정몽선; 1954–	Kim Geun-su 김근수; 1948–	Chung Mong-jin 정몽진; 1960–	Chung Mong-yeol 정몽열; 1964–
(몽)
(Note: Given name starts with Mong- (몽) for males in this generation. Female given names often start with Chung- (정), but not always.)	Chung Mong-kun (Note: Married to Woo Kyung-sook (우경숙; 1951–)) 정몽근; 1942–	Chung Mong-hun (Note: Married to Hyun Jeong-eun (현정은; 1955–)) 정몽헌; 1948–2003	Chung Mong-il (Note: Married to Kwon Jun-hee (권준희; 1961–)) 정몽일; 1959–	Chung Mong-won (Note: Married to Hong In-hwa (홍인화; 1957–)) 정몽원; 1955–	Chung Mong-hoon 정몽훈; 1959–	Chung Chung-suk 정정숙; 1962–	Chung Mong-ik 정몽익; 1962–
Chung Kyung-hee (Note: Married to Jung Hee-young (정희영; 1940–)) 정경희; 1944–	Chung Mong-joon (Note: Married to Kim Young-myeong (김영명; 1956–)) 정몽준; 1951–	Chung Mong-seok 정몽석; 1958–	Chung Mong-yong 정몽용; 1961–	Chung Mong-gyu (Note: Married to Kim Na-young (김나영)) 정몽규; 1962–	Chung Yoo-kyung 정유경; 1970–
Chung Ji-yi 정지이; 1977–	Chung Young-yi 정영이; 1984–	Chung Young-seon 정영선; 1985–	Chung Hyeon-seon 정현선; 1989–	Chung Mun-yi 정문이; 1991–
Chung Il-seon 정일선; 1970–	Chung Moon-seon 정문선; 1974–	Chung Dae-seon (Note: Married to news anchor Noh Hyeon-jeong (노현정, 1979–)) 정대선; 1977–	Chung Chung-yi 정정이; 1984–	Chung Kyung-seon 정경선; 1986–
Seon
(선)	Chung Ji-seon 정지선; 1972–	Chung Gyo-seon 정교선; 1974–	Chung Kisun 정기선; 1982–	Chung Nam-yi 정남이; 1983–	Chung Seon-yi 정선이; 1986–	Chung Ye-seon 정예선; 1996–
(Note: Given name terminates in -seon (선) for males in this generation. Female given names usually terminate in -yi (이), but not always.)
Chung Eun-hee 정은희; 1971–	Chung Yu-hee 정유희; 1973–	Chung Seong-yi (Note: Married to Daejeon Sun Hospital chief director Seon Du-hun (선두훈, 1957–)) 정성이; 1962–	Chung Myeong-yi (Note: Married to Hyundai Card vice chairman Chung Tae-yeong (정태영, 1960–)) 정명이; 1964–	Chung Yoon-yi (Note: Formerly married to Samwoo vice-chairman Sin Seong-jae (신성재, 1968–)) 정윤이; 1968–	Chung Eui-seon (Note: Married to Chung Do-won's daughter Chung Ji-seon (정지선, 1970–)) 정의선; 1970–
Chung Sanghyeon 정상현; 2007–	Seon A-yeong (Note: Married to Gil Yong-wu's son Gil Seong-Jin (길성진, 1984–)) 선아영; 1987–	Seon Tong-uk (Note: Married to Chae Hyeong-seok's daughter Chae Su-yeon (채수연, 1990–)) 선동욱; 1989–	Sin U-jin 신우진; 1993–	Sin U-hyeon 신우현; 2004–
N/A
Chung Yun-hwi 정상현; 2013–	Chung Yu-mi 정유미; 1988–	Chung Yu-jin 정유진; 1990–	Chung Jun (Note: Married to professional golfer Lydia Ko (리디아 고, 1997–)) 정준; 1997–	Sin U-taek 신우택; 1996–	Chung Jin-hui 정진희; 1996–	Chung Enoch 정장철; 2003–

Notes
In general: marriages indicated by dashed lines, female on the left.

Sources
- 김봄내 (May 15, 2015). "[재벌가족사]정주영 현대그룹 창업주" [Chaebol Family History: Chung Ju-yung, founder of Hyundai Group]. KJtimes (in Korean).
- 김태현 (March 23, 2015). "[단독보도] 정주영 막내딸 미국서 엄마 없이 결혼" [Exclusive: Chung Ju-yung's youngest daughter gets married without her mother in the United States]. 일요신문 (in Korean).
- "Family Drama". Forbes. April 26, 2011.

== See also ==
- Automotive industry in South Korea
