= Chung Ju-yung =

South Korean entrepreneur (1915–2001)

Chung Ju-Yung MP
- 정주영
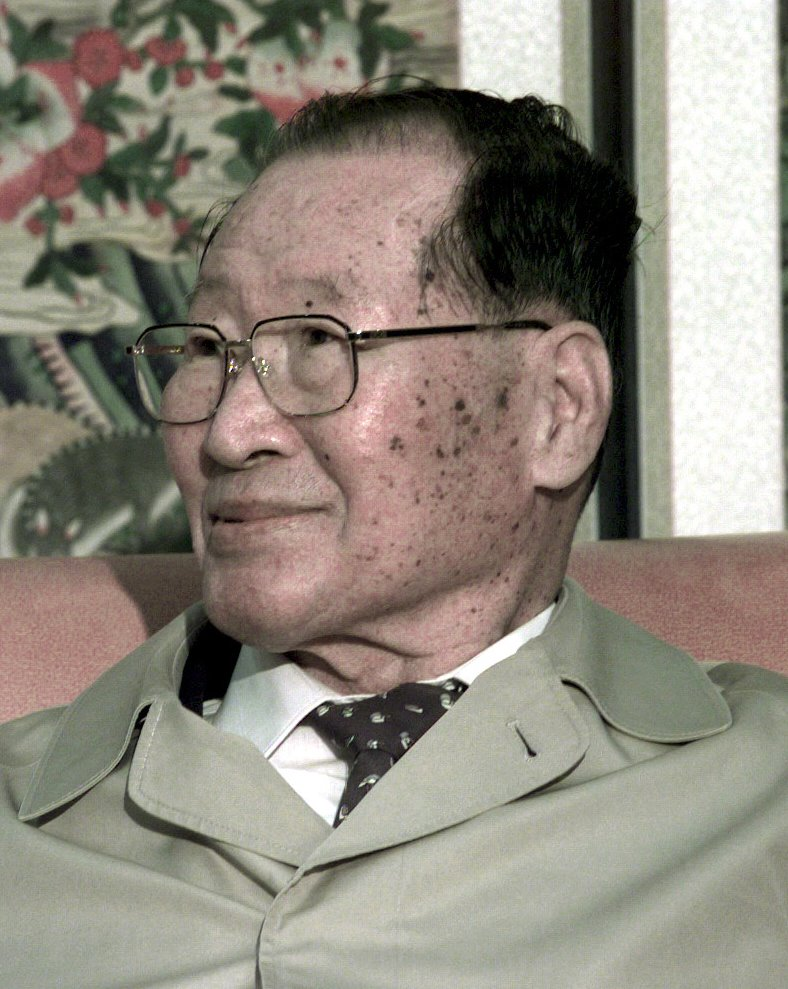
- Chung in 1998
- Born: 25 November 1915; Tongchon, Korea, Empire of Japan
- Died: 21 March 2001 (aged 85); Songpa District, Seoul, South Korea
- Occupations: Politician; Chaebol
- Known for: Founder and honorary chairman of Hyundai
- Political party: Unification National Party
- Spouse: Byun Joong-seok
- Children: 11 (8 sons and 3 daughters)

Korean name
- Hangul: 정주영
- Hanja: 鄭周永
- RR: Jeong Juyeong
- MR: Chŏng Chuyŏng

Art name
- Hangul: 아산
- Hanja: 峨山
- RR: Asan
- MR: Asan

Chung Ju-Yung (Korean: 정주영; 25 November 1915 – 21 March 2001) was a South Korean entrepreneur and the founder of Hyundai Group, one of South Korea's largest chaebols.

== Early life ==
Chung Ju-Yung was born into an impoverished family on 25 November 1915 in Tongchon County, Korea, under the Empire of Japan's occupation (now Kangwon Province, North Korea). Chung graduated from Songjun Primary School in March 1931. He then attended his grandfather's Confucian school while working on his parents' farm.

In 1933, at the age of 18, he became a stevedore at Jinsen Harbor (Incheon), currently in South Korea). He also worked as a construction laborer on the construction of Korea University and was a starch syrup factory worker for a year. Chung began working for Bokheung Rice Store, first as a delivery man, and then a bookkeeper.

In 1936, he married Byun Joong-Seok. In 1937, the store owner became ill, and gave the store to Chung. He renamed the business Kyungil Rice Store. In 1939, the Japanese colonial government restricted Korean ownership of rice shops, and Chung lost his store.

== Career ==
=== Pre-Hyundai ===
After losing his store, Chung returned to his village and remained there until 1940, when he decided to try again in Keijō. Because of restrictions imposed on Koreans by the Japanese Colonial Government, Chung entered the automobile repair business. Using a garage purchased from a friend, Chung started the A-do Service Garage with a 3,000 won loan. Within three years, the number of employees grew from 20 to 70. In 1943, the Japanese colonial government forced the garage to merge with a steel plant during the war effort. He left Keijō and returned to his village with 50,000 yen in savings.

=== Hyundai (1946–1986) ===
In 1946, after the liberation of Korea from Japanese control, Chung went back to Seoul and launched Hyundai Auto Service and Hyundai Construction Company. During the North Korean invasion of 1950, Chung abandoned his construction projects and fled with his younger brother to Busan for safety. His son, Chung Mong-joon, was born there. Chung continued expanding the company by taking on available work from the United Nations Command and the Korean Ministry of Transportation. Once Seoul was retaken by UN forces, Chung re-established the company and continued to obtain more work from the United States.

In 1972, he founded Hyundai Shipbuilding & Heavy Industries, and established the Ulsan shipyard as its headquarters. He introduced the Hyundai Pony in 1976 and the Hyundai Excel in 1986.

Beginning in the 1980s until recently, the Hyundai Group was split into many satellite groups. Chung was the first civilian to cross the Korean DMZ after the division of Korea. He was also the first to propose the Geumgangsan sightseeing excursions. He founded the Hyundai Heavy Steel Company.

In 1982, Chung received the Golden Plate Award of the American Academy of Achievement.

== Political career ==
Chung ran unsuccessfully as a Unification National Party presidential candidate for the 1992 South Korean presidential election. During this time, he was estimated to have a personal wealth of $4 billion.

== Death ==
Chung died on 21 March 2001, at the age of 85, from pneumonia after receiving at-home treatment for other long-term illnesses. He was buried in accordance with Buddhist and Confucian customary rites. His wife, Byun Joong-Seok, died on 17 August 2007, at the age of 86, due in part to long-term heart complications. She was buried in a family cemetery in Hanam, alongside her husband and their son.

== Books ==
- Trials May Not Fail (시련은 있어도 실패는 없다)
- Born in This Land (이 땅에 태어나서)
- Your Lips Need to Burn: If You Plan to Succeed (입이 뜨거워야 성공할 수 있다)

== Family ==
Chung family tree

Han Seong-sil 한성실 ?	Chung Bong-sik 정봉식 ?
Yung	Byun Joong-seok 변중석; 1921–2007	Chung Ju-yung 정주영; 1915–2001	Kim Kyung-hee 김경희; 1953–	Park Byeong-im 박병임; 1928–2015	Chung Soon-yung 정순영; 1922–2005	Park Young-ja 박영자; 1936–	Chung Se-yung 정세영; 1928–2005	Jo Eun-ju 조은주; 1936–	Chung Sang-yung 정상영; 1936–2021
(영)
(Note: Given name terminates in -yung (영) for males and females in this generation)	Kim Wol-gye 김월계; 1923–2003	Chung In-yung 정인영; 1920–2006	Chung Hee-yung 정희영; 1925–2015	Kim Young-joo 김영주; 1920–2010	Jang Jeong-ja 장정자; 1935–	Chung Shin-yung 정신영; 1931–62
Chung Mong-pil (Note: Married to Lee Yang-ja (이양자; 1943–90)) 정몽필; 1934–82	Chung Chung-in (Grace) 정정인; 1979–	Chung Chung-im (Elizabeth) 정정임; 1981–	Chung Hyeong-suk 정형숙; 1951–74	Chung Moon-sook 정문숙; 1947–	Kim Yun-su 김윤수; 1946–	Chung Sook-young (Note: Married to Prof. Noh Kyung-soo (노경수; 1954–)) 정숙영; 1960–	Chung Il-kyung 정일경; 1960–	Chung Mong-hyuk 정몽혁; 1961–
Mong	Chung Mong-koo (Note: Married to Lee Jung-hwa (이정화; 1939–2009)) 정몽구; 1938–	Chung Mong-woo (Note: Married to Lee Haeng-ja (이행자; 1945–)) 정몽우; 1945–90	Chung Mong-yoon (Note: Married to Kim Hye-young (김혜영; 1961–)) 정몽윤; 1955–	Chung Mong-guk (Note: Married to Lee Yoon-hee (이윤희; 1954–)) 정몽국; 1953–	Chung Mong-sun 정몽선; 1954–	Kim Geun-su 김근수; 1948–	Chung Mong-jin 정몽진; 1960–	Chung Mong-yeol 정몽열; 1964–
(몽)
(Note: Given name starts with Mong- (몽) for males in this generation. Female given names often start with Chung- (정), but not always.)	Chung Mong-kun (Note: Married to Woo Kyung-sook (우경숙; 1951–)) 정몽근; 1942–	Chung Mong-hun (Note: Married to Hyun Jeong-eun (현정은; 1955–)) 정몽헌; 1948–2003	Chung Mong-il (Note: Married to Kwon Jun-hee (권준희; 1961–)) 정몽일; 1959–	Chung Mong-won (Note: Married to Hong In-hwa (홍인화; 1957–)) 정몽원; 1955–	Chung Mong-hoon 정몽훈; 1959–	Chung Chung-suk 정정숙; 1962–	Chung Mong-ik 정몽익; 1962–
Chung Kyung-hee (Note: Married to Jung Hee-young (정희영; 1940–)) 정경희; 1944–	Chung Mong-joon (Note: Married to Kim Young-myeong (김영명; 1956–)) 정몽준; 1951–	Chung Mong-seok 정몽석; 1958–	Chung Mong-yong 정몽용; 1961–	Chung Mong-gyu (Note: Married to Kim Na-young (김나영)) 정몽규; 1962–	Chung Yoo-kyung 정유경; 1970–
Chung Ji-yi 정지이; 1977–	Chung Young-yi 정영이; 1984–	Chung Young-seon 정영선; 1985–	Chung Hyeon-seon 정현선; 1989–	Chung Mun-yi 정문이; 1991–
Chung Il-seon 정일선; 1970–	Chung Moon-seon 정문선; 1974–	Chung Dae-seon (Note: Married to news anchor Noh Hyeon-jeong (노현정, 1979–)) 정대선; 1977–	Chung Chung-yi 정정이; 1984–	Chung Kyung-seon 정경선; 1986–
Seon
(선)	Chung Ji-seon 정지선; 1972–	Chung Gyo-seon 정교선; 1974–	Chung Kisun 정기선; 1982–	Chung Nam-yi 정남이; 1983–	Chung Seon-yi 정선이; 1986–	Chung Ye-seon 정예선; 1996–
(Note: Given name terminates in -seon (선) for males in this generation. Female given names usually terminate in -yi (이), but not always.)
Chung Eun-hee 정은희; 1971–	Chung Yu-hee 정유희; 1973–	Chung Seong-yi (Note: Married to Daejeon Sun Hospital chief director Seon Du-hun (선두훈, 1957–)) 정성이; 1962–	Chung Myeong-yi (Note: Married to Hyundai Card vice chairman Chung Tae-yeong (정태영, 1960–)) 정명이; 1964–	Chung Yoon-yi (Note: Formerly married to Samwoo vice-chairman Sin Seong-jae (신성재, 1968–)) 정윤이; 1968–	Chung Eui-seon (Note: Married to Chung Do-won's daughter Chung Ji-seon (정지선, 1970–)) 정의선; 1970–
Chung Sanghyeon 정상현; 2007–	Seon A-yeong (Note: Married to Gil Yong-wu's son Gil Seong-Jin (길성진, 1984–)) 선아영; 1987–	Seon Tong-uk (Note: Married to Chae Hyeong-seok's daughter Chae Su-yeon (채수연, 1990–)) 선동욱; 1989–	Sin U-jin 신우진; 1993–	Sin U-hyeon 신우현; 2004–
N/A
Chung Yun-hwi 정상현; 2013–	Chung Yu-mi 정유미; 1988–	Chung Yu-jin 정유진; 1990–	Chung Jun (Note: Married to professional golfer Lydia Ko (리디아 고, 1997–)) 정준; 1997–	Sin U-taek 신우택; 1996–	Chung Jin-hui 정진희; 1996–	Chung Enoch 정장철; 2003–

Notes
In general: marriages indicated by dashed lines, female on the left.

Sources
- 김봄내 (15 May 2015). "[재벌가족사]정주영 현대그룹 창업주" [Chaebol Family History: Chung Ju-yung, founder of Hyundai Group]. KJtimes (in Korean).
- 김태현 (23 March 2015). "[단독보도] 정주영 막내딸 미국서 엄마 없이 결혼" [Exclusive: Chung Ju-yung's youngest daughter gets married without her mother in the United States]. 일요신문 (in Korean).
- "Family Drama". Forbes. 26 April 2011.

Chung Ju-Yung had five brothers and one sister; he had eight sons and one daughter with his wife. In addition, he had two daughters with a younger woman, with whom he started a relationship in 1973; these daughters were not acknowledged until after his death.

=== Brothers ===
- Chung In-yung (1920–2006). After leaving the Hyundai Group, he founded the Halla Group, whose interests included Mando Machinery, Halla Cement, Halla Construction, Halla Heavy Industries, and Halla Climate Control Corp.
- Chung Soon-Yung (1925–2015). After working for Hyundai Engineering & Construction, he left the company, taking Hyundai Cement with him to form the Sungwoo Business Group, which includes Hyundai Cement, Hyundai Welding, and Sungwoo Automotive.
- Chung Se-yung (1928–2005). He founded Hyundai Motor. He later left the Hyundai Group, taking control of Hyundai Development Co., Ltd., a major housing builder in Korea.
- Chung Shin-Yung (1931–1962). Died in a car accident in Germany while working as a journalist for a Korean newspaper company. His only son, Chung Mong-hyuk, ran Hyundai Oilbank, the third largest oil refiner in Korea.
- Chung Sang-yung (1936–2021). Founder of the KCC Chemical (Keumkang) group, a major South Korean manufacturer of paints and glass products.

=== Children ===
- Chung Mong-pil (1934–1982). Died in a car accident in Gimcheon, in a Hyundai-built Ford Granada, on the Gyeongbu Expressway leaving two daughters.
- Chung Mong-koo (1938–). Head of the Hyundai Kia Automotive Group, the second largest business group in Korea. Assumed control of Hyundai Engineering & Construction in 2011.
- Chung Mong-kun (1942–). Chairman of the Hyundai Department Store Group, one of the largest retailers in South Korea.
- Chung Kyung-hee (1944–). The only daughter of Chung Ju-Yung and Byeon Joong-Seok.
- Chung Mong-woo (1945–1990). Died by suicide, leaving three sons. His oldest son Chung Il-sun is the president of BNG Steel, a member of the Hyundai Kia Automotive Group.
- Chung Mong-hun (1948–2003). Former chairman of the Hyundai Group and heir apparent to his father before he died by suicide in August 2003; this left his wife Hyun Jeong-eun (1956–) in control of the Hyundai Group.
- Chung Mong-joon (1951–). Politician and de facto owner of Hyundai Heavy Industries, the world's largest shipbuilding firm, as well as vice-chairman of FIFA.
- Chung Mong-yoon (1955–). Chairman of Hyundai Marine & Fire Insurance, Korea's third largest non-life insurer.
- Chung Mong-il (1959–). Former chairman of Hyundai Merchant Bank and Kangwon Bank.
- Chung Chung-in (Grace Jeong; 1979–), actress.
- Chung Chung-im (Elizabeth Jeong; 1981–), advertiser.

=== Nephews ===
via Chung In-yung (1920–2006)

- Chung Mong-guk.
- Chung Mong-won. Chairman of Halla Group. Recently reacquired Mando Machinery.

via Chung-Soon-Yung (1925–2015)

- Chung Mong-sun. Chairman of Sungwoo Group (Hyundai Cement).
- Chung Mong-suk. Chairman of Hyundai Welding Co., Ltd.
- Chung Mong-hoon. Chairman of Sungwoo Hyokwang International Co.
- Chung Mong-yong. Chairman of Sungwoo Automotive.

via Chung Se-yung (1928–2005)

- Chung Mong-gyu. Former Chairman of Hyundai Motor. Current Chairman of Hyundai Development Co., Ltd.

via Chung Shin-Yung (1931–1962)

- Chung Mong-hyuk. Former President of Hyundai Oil & Hyundai Petrochemical; current chairman of Hyundai Corporation.

via Chung Sang-yung (1936–)

- Chung Mong-jin. Chairman of KCC.
- Chung Mong-ik. Vice-chairman of KCC.
- Chung Mong-yeol. President of KCC Construction Co., Ltd.

== Election results ==
Year	Elections	Constituency	Political party	Votes (%)	Results
1992	14th National Assembly General Election	National (3rd)	UNP	3,574,419 (17.37%)	Elected
1992	1992 Presidential Election	South Korea	UNP	3,880,067 (16.31%)	Defeated (3rd)

== See also ==
- Lee Byung-chul (Founder of Samsung)
