= Chung Mong-hun =

Founder of Hyundai Group

- 정몽헌
- Born: September 14, 1948
- Died: August 4, 2003 (aged 54); Hyundai office, Seoul
- Cause of death: Suicide by jumping
- Occupations: Entrepreneur; businessman
- Father: Chung Ju-yung

- Korean name
- Hangul: 정몽헌
- Hanja: 鄭夢憲
- RR: Jeong Mongheon
- MR: Chŏng Monghŏn

Chung Mong-hun (Korean: 정몽헌; September 14, 1948 – August 4, 2003) was the 5th son of Chung Ju-yung, the founder of the South Korean Hyundai conglomerate. After the death of his father, he took over part of his father's role and became the chairman of Hyundai Asan, the company in charge of various business ventures between North and South Korea. He committed suicide in 2003.

== Professional career ==
Chung Mong-hun joined Hyundai Heavy Industries in 1975, becoming president of the company's shipping interests by 1981. His father, Hyundai Group founder Chung Ju-yung, was impressed by his management style and put him in charge of the company's electronics division in 1982.

In 1997, Chung Ju-yung appointed Mong-hun as the group's co-chairman. In 2000, after Ju-yung's eldest son, Mong-koo, attempted to oust Mong-hun, Ju-yung made Mong-hun the group's sole chairman. Later that year, Ju-yung announced that he and his sons would resign from all management positions at Hyundai companies, except Mong-hun would remain the chair of Hyundai Asan. However, Mong-koo remained the chairman of Hyundai Motors and Kia Motors.

Chung Mong-hun was appointed by his father, who was born in Japan-controlled North Korea, to handle Hyundai business with the government of North Korea. He took pride in this position, and reportedly decorated his office with photographs of Hyundai officials meeting with Kim Jong Il in Pyongyang, as well as photos of himself showing Kim around a North Korean resort that Hyundai operated.

== Scandal and suicide ==
In June 2003, Chung was indicted for his role in the "cash-for-summit scandal" on charges of doctoring company books to hide the secret money transfers of millions of dollars by the Kim Dae-jung administration to North Korea to set up the 2000 inter-Korean summit. Facing up to three years in prison after he was forced to testify in court about the money transfer days earlier, he committed suicide on August 4, 2003, by leaping from his 12th floor office.

== Family ==
Chung family tree

Han Seong-sil 한성실 ?	Chung Bong-sik 정봉식 ?
Yung	Byun Joong-seok 변중석; 1921–2007	Chung Ju-yung 정주영; 1915–2001	Kim Kyung-hee 김경희; 1953–	Park Byeong-im 박병임; 1928–2015	Chung Soon-yung 정순영; 1922–2005	Park Young-ja 박영자; 1936–	Chung Se-yung 정세영; 1928–2005	Jo Eun-ju 조은주; 1936–	Chung Sang-yung 정상영; 1936–2021
(영)
(Note: Given name terminates in -yung (영) for males and females in this generation)	Kim Wol-gye 김월계; 1923–2003	Chung In-yung 정인영; 1920–2006	Chung Hee-yung 정희영; 1925–2015	Kim Young-joo 김영주; 1920–2010	Jang Jeong-ja 장정자; 1935–	Chung Shin-yung 정신영; 1931–62
Chung Mong-pil (Note: Married to Lee Yang-ja (이양자; 1943–90)) 정몽필; 1934–82	Chung Chung-in (Grace) 정정인; 1979–	Chung Chung-im (Elizabeth) 정정임; 1981–	Chung Hyeong-suk 정형숙; 1951–74	Chung Moon-sook 정문숙; 1947–	Kim Yun-su 김윤수; 1946–	Chung Sook-young (Note: Married to Prof. Noh Kyung-soo (노경수; 1954–)) 정숙영; 1960–	Chung Il-kyung 정일경; 1960–	Chung Mong-hyuk 정몽혁; 1961–
Mong	Chung Mong-koo (Note: Married to Lee Jung-hwa (이정화; 1939–2009)) 정몽구; 1938–	Chung Mong-woo (Note: Married to Lee Haeng-ja (이행자; 1945–)) 정몽우; 1945–90	Chung Mong-yoon (Note: Married to Kim Hye-young (김혜영; 1961–)) 정몽윤; 1955–	Chung Mong-guk (Note: Married to Lee Yoon-hee (이윤희; 1954–)) 정몽국; 1953–	Chung Mong-sun 정몽선; 1954–	Kim Geun-su 김근수; 1948–	Chung Mong-jin 정몽진; 1960–	Chung Mong-yeol 정몽열; 1964–
(몽)
(Note: Given name starts with Mong- (몽) for males in this generation. Female given names often start with Chung- (정), but not always.)	Chung Mong-kun (Note: Married to Woo Kyung-sook (우경숙; 1951–)) 정몽근; 1942–	Chung Mong-hun (Note: Married to Hyun Jeong-eun (현정은; 1955–)) 정몽헌; 1948–2003	Chung Mong-il (Note: Married to Kwon Jun-hee (권준희; 1961–)) 정몽일; 1959–	Chung Mong-won (Note: Married to Hong In-hwa (홍인화; 1957–)) 정몽원; 1955–	Chung Mong-hoon 정몽훈; 1959–	Chung Chung-suk 정정숙; 1962–	Chung Mong-ik 정몽익; 1962–
Chung Kyung-hee (Note: Married to Jung Hee-young (정희영; 1940–)) 정경희; 1944–	Chung Mong-joon (Note: Married to Kim Young-myeong (김영명; 1956–)) 정몽준; 1951–	Chung Mong-seok 정몽석; 1958–	Chung Mong-yong 정몽용; 1961–	Chung Mong-gyu (Note: Married to Kim Na-young (김나영)) 정몽규; 1962–	Chung Yoo-kyung 정유경; 1970–
Chung Ji-yi 정지이; 1977–	Chung Young-yi 정영이; 1984–	Chung Young-seon 정영선; 1985–	Chung Hyeon-seon 정현선; 1989–	Chung Mun-yi 정문이; 1991–
Chung Il-seon 정일선; 1970–	Chung Moon-seon 정문선; 1974–	Chung Dae-seon (Note: Married to news anchor Noh Hyeon-jeong (노현정, 1979–)) 정대선; 1977–	Chung Chung-yi 정정이; 1984–	Chung Kyung-seon 정경선; 1986–
Seon
(선)	Chung Ji-seon 정지선; 1972–	Chung Gyo-seon 정교선; 1974–	Chung Kisun 정기선; 1982–	Chung Nam-yi 정남이; 1983–	Chung Seon-yi 정선이; 1986–	Chung Ye-seon 정예선; 1996–
(Note: Given name terminates in -seon (선) for males in this generation. Female given names usually terminate in -yi (이), but not always.)
Chung Eun-hee 정은희; 1971–	Chung Yu-hee 정유희; 1973–	Chung Seong-yi (Note: Married to Daejeon Sun Hospital chief director Seon Du-hun (선두훈, 1957–)) 정성이; 1962–	Chung Myeong-yi (Note: Married to Hyundai Card vice chairman Chung Tae-yeong (정태영, 1960–)) 정명이; 1964–	Chung Yoon-yi (Note: Formerly married to Samwoo vice-chairman Sin Seong-jae (신성재, 1968–)) 정윤이; 1968–	Chung Eui-seon (Note: Married to Chung Do-won's daughter Chung Ji-seon (정지선, 1970–)) 정의선; 1970–
Chung Sanghyeon 정상현; 2007–	Seon A-yeong (Note: Married to Gil Yong-wu's son Gil Seong-Jin (길성진, 1984–)) 선아영; 1987–	Seon Tong-uk (Note: Married to Chae Hyeong-seok's daughter Chae Su-yeon (채수연, 1990–)) 선동욱; 1989–	Sin U-jin 신우진; 1993–	Sin U-hyeon 신우현; 2004–
N/A
Chung Yun-hwi 정상현; 2013–	Chung Yu-mi 정유미; 1988–	Chung Yu-jin 정유진; 1990–	Chung Jun (Note: Married to professional golfer Lydia Ko (리디아 고, 1997–)) 정준; 1997–	Sin U-taek 신우택; 1996–	Chung Jin-hui 정진희; 1996–	Chung Chang-cheol 정장철; 1998–

Notes
In general: marriages indicated by dashed lines, female on the left.

Sources
- 김봄내 (May 15, 2015). "[재벌가족사]정주영 현대그룹 창업주" [Chaebol Family History: Chung Ju-yung, founder of Hyundai Group]. KJtimes (in Korean).
- 김태현 (March 23, 2015). "[단독보도] 정주영 막내딸 미국서 엄마 없이 결혼" [Exclusive: Chung Ju-yung's youngest daughter gets married without her mother in the United States]. 일요신문 (in Korean).
- "Family Drama". Forbes. April 26, 2011.
