= Chung Mong-won =

South Korean ice hockey administrator and businessman (born 1955)

- 정몽원
- Born: 4 August 1955 (age 71); Seoul, South Korea
- Education: Korea University - BBA; University of Southern California - MBA
- Occupation: Businessman
- Employer(s): Halla Group, Mando Corporation
- Known for: Korea Ice Hockey Association chairman, Asia League Ice Hockey co-founder, Anyang Halla team owner
- Awards: IIHF Hall of Fame (2020)

Chung Mong-won (Korean: 정몽원, born 4 August 1955) is a South Korean ice hockey administrator and businessman. He has been chief executive officer of both Halla Group and Mando Corporation, founded the Anyang Halla hockey team in 1994, and co-founded Asia League Ice Hockey in 2003. He became involved in international ice hockey as manager of the South Korea men's national ice hockey team in 2003, then became chairman of the Korea Ice Hockey Association in 2013, and implemented a development plan for the men's national team and the South Korea women's national ice hockey team in advance of ice hockey at the 2018 Winter Olympics hosted in South Korea. Under his leadership, the men's national team earned promotion to the top tier at the 2018 IIHF World Championship, and the women's national team played in the 2018 Winter Olympics on a Unified Korea team with North Korea. The International Ice Hockey Federation (IIHF) has named Chung to its 2020 IIHF Hall of Fame group of inductees.

== Early life and education ==
Chung was born on 4 August 1955, in Seoul, South Korea. He is the second son of Chung In-young, who founded Halla Group.

Chung graduated from Seoul High School in 1974, earned a Bachelor of Business Administration degree from Korea University in 1979, and a Master of Business Administration degree from the University of Southern California in 1982.

== Business career ==
Chung joined the Halla Group in 1978, employed in shipping. He later joined Hyundai Corporation as a manager, then became executive director of Mando Corporation Machinery in 1983. He became president and chief executive officer of Halla Climate Control in 1986, president of Mando Corporation Machinery in 1989, then president and chief executive officer of Halla in 1991. He served as vice-chairman of Halla Group starting in 1992, then became its chairman in 1997. Due to the 1997 Asian financial crisis, he disbanded the group in 1998. Halla Group was reformed in 2001, with Chung as its chairman and chief executive officer. In 2017, he purchased Mando and transformed it into a holding company, then became its chairman and chief executive officer.

== Professional hockey team owner ==
Chung founded the first professional ice hockey team in South Korea in 1994, when he became involved after his employees asked to form a team. He financed the foundation of a professional hockey team in 1994 known as Mando Winia, which later became Halla Winia and then Anyang Halla. He was a co-founder of the Asia League Ice Hockey in 2003, which included teams from China, Japan, and the Russian Far East, in addition to Korea. As of 2020, Anyang Halla have won five Asia League Ice Hockey championships, won the most regular-season games, and regularly sends players to represent Korea in international competitions.

Chung was a franchise owner of Kiekko-Vantaa from 2012 to 2015, as a subsidiary of Halla Group.

== Korean international ice hockey ==
Chung was manager of the South Korea men's national ice hockey team for seven Ice Hockey World Championships between 2003 and 2016. He became vice-president of the Korea Ice Hockey Association in 2010, then was elected its president in 2013. The national team earned several promotions during his tenure, which included winning Division II three times in 2003, 2007, and 2009, then winning Division 1 in 2012 and again in 2015. In 2015, Chung signed an agreement with DHL for logistics support, which meant that players and team staff no longer had to transport equipment themselves. He was manager of the South Korea under-18 men's national ice hockey team manager during competitions in 2017 and 2018.

After Pyeongchang County was named host of the 2018 Winter Olympics, Chung set out to improve South Korea's standing in the world ice rankings to ensure its participation in ice hockey at the 2018 Winter Olympics. He hired Sarah Murray to coach the South Korea women's national ice hockey team, and brought in Jim Paek and Richard Park who both had playing experience in the National Hockey League to coach the men's national team. The men's team placed second in 2017 IIHF World Championship Division I to earn promotion to the top tier at the 2018 IIHF World Championship. The women's team played together on a Unified Korea team including athletes from North and South Korea, a first for the two Koreas at the Olympic Games.

Chung has stated a desire for the Gangneung Hockey Centre to become the focus of ice hockey in Korea, and to leave an Olympic Games legacy. He said, "My dream is to turn Gangneung into a hockey town. I hope to see the day when people think of Gangneung, they'll think of hockey". In 2019, the Korea Ice Hockey Association voted to run its national development programs in Gangneung.

== Awards and honours ==
On 18 April 2019, Chung was named as the honorary consul of the Republic of Slovenia to South Korea, based at the Sigma Tower in Jamsil, Seoul. He was named by the International Ice Hockey Federation (IIHF) to the builder's category in the 2020 class of IIHF Hall of Fame inductees. The induction was scheduled the 2020 IIHF World Championship in Zürich, but was delayed until the 2022 IIHF World Championship due to the COVID-19 pandemic. Chung was the first inductee from South Korea into the IIHF Hall of Fame.

== Personal life ==
Chung met his wife, Hong In-hwa on a blind date at a church, and the couple have two daughters. He is an elder of the Korean Methodist Church.

=== Family ===
Chung family tree

Han Seong-sil 한성실 ?	Chung Bong-sik 정봉식 ?
Yung	Byun Joong-seok 변중석; 1921–2007	Chung Ju-yung 정주영; 1915–2001	Kim Kyung-hee 김경희; 1953–	Park Byeong-im 박병임; 1928–2015	Chung Soon-yung 정순영; 1922–2005	Park Young-ja 박영자; 1936–	Chung Se-yung 정세영; 1928–2005	Jo Eun-ju 조은주; 1936–	Chung Sang-yung 정상영; 1936–2021
(영)
(Note: Given name terminates in -yung (영) for males and females in this generation)	Kim Wol-gye 김월계; 1923–2003	Chung In-yung 정인영; 1920–2006	Chung Hee-yung 정희영; 1925–2015	Kim Young-joo 김영주; 1920–2010	Jang Jeong-ja 장정자; 1935–	Chung Shin-yung 정신영; 1931–62
Chung Mong-pil (Note: Married to Lee Yang-ja (이양자; 1943–90)) 정몽필; 1934–82	Chung Chung-in (Grace) 정정인; 1979–	Chung Chung-im (Elizabeth) 정정임; 1981–	Chung Hyeong-suk 정형숙; 1951–74	Chung Moon-sook 정문숙; 1947–	Kim Yun-su 김윤수; 1946–	Chung Sook-young (Note: Married to Prof. Noh Kyung-soo (노경수; 1954–)) 정숙영; 1960–	Chung Il-kyung 정일경; 1960–	Chung Mong-hyuk 정몽혁; 1961–
Mong	Chung Mong-koo (Note: Married to Lee Jung-hwa (이정화; 1939–2009)) 정몽구; 1938–	Chung Mong-woo (Note: Married to Lee Haeng-ja (이행자; 1945–)) 정몽우; 1945–90	Chung Mong-yoon (Note: Married to Kim Hye-young (김혜영; 1961–)) 정몽윤; 1955–	Chung Mong-guk (Note: Married to Lee Yoon-hee (이윤희; 1954–)) 정몽국; 1953–	Chung Mong-sun 정몽선; 1954–	Kim Geun-su 김근수; 1948–	Chung Mong-jin 정몽진; 1960–	Chung Mong-yeol 정몽열; 1964–
(몽)
(Note: Given name starts with Mong- (몽) for males in this generation. Female given names often start with Chung- (정), but not always.)	Chung Mong-kun (Note: Married to Woo Kyung-sook (우경숙; 1951–)) 정몽근; 1942–	Chung Mong-hun (Note: Married to Hyun Jeong-eun (현정은; 1955–)) 정몽헌; 1948–2003	Chung Mong-il (Note: Married to Kwon Jun-hee (권준희; 1961–)) 정몽일; 1959–	Chung Mong-won (Note: Married to Hong In-hwa (홍인화; 1957–)) 정몽원; 1955–	Chung Mong-hoon 정몽훈; 1959–	Chung Chung-suk 정정숙; 1962–	Chung Mong-ik 정몽익; 1962–
Chung Kyung-hee (Note: Married to Jung Hee-young (정희영; 1940–)) 정경희; 1944–	Chung Mong-joon (Note: Married to Kim Young-myeong (김영명; 1956–)) 정몽준; 1951–	Chung Mong-seok 정몽석; 1958–	Chung Mong-yong 정몽용; 1961–	Chung Mong-gyu (Note: Married to Kim Na-young (김나영)) 정몽규; 1962–	Chung Yoo-kyung 정유경; 1970–
Chung Ji-yi 정지이; 1977–	Chung Young-yi 정영이; 1984–	Chung Young-seon 정영선; 1985–	Chung Hyeon-seon 정현선; 1989–	Chung Mun-yi 정문이; 1991–
Chung Il-seon 정일선; 1970–	Chung Moon-seon 정문선; 1974–	Chung Dae-seon (Note: Married to news anchor Noh Hyeon-jeong (노현정, 1979–)) 정대선; 1977–	Chung Chung-yi 정정이; 1984–	Chung Kyung-seon 정경선; 1986–
Seon
(선)	Chung Ji-seon 정지선; 1972–	Chung Gyo-seon 정교선; 1974–	Chung Kisun 정기선; 1982–	Chung Nam-yi 정남이; 1983–	Chung Seon-yi 정선이; 1986–	Chung Ye-seon 정예선; 1996–
(Note: Given name terminates in -seon (선) for males in this generation. Female given names usually terminate in -yi (이), but not always.)
Chung Eun-hee 정은희; 1971–	Chung Yu-hee 정유희; 1973–	Chung Seong-yi (Note: Married to Daejeon Sun Hospital chief director Seon Du-hun (선두훈, 1957–)) 정성이; 1962–	Chung Myeong-yi (Note: Married to Hyundai Card vice chairman Chung Tae-yeong (정태영, 1960–)) 정명이; 1964–	Chung Yoon-yi (Note: Formerly married to Samwoo vice-chairman Sin Seong-jae (신성재, 1968–)) 정윤이; 1968–	Chung Eui-seon (Note: Married to Chung Do-won's daughter Chung Ji-seon (정지선, 1970–)) 정의선; 1970–
Chung Sanghyeon 정상현; 2007–	Seon A-yeong (Note: Married to Gil Yong-wu's son Gil Seong-Jin (길성진, 1984–)) 선아영; 1987–	Seon Tong-uk (Note: Married to Chae Hyeong-seok's daughter Chae Su-yeon (채수연, 1990–)) 선동욱; 1989–	Sin U-jin 신우진; 1993–	Sin U-hyeon 신우현; 2004–
N/A
Chung Yun-hwi 정상현; 2013–	Chung Yu-mi 정유미; 1988–	Chung Yu-jin 정유진; 1990–	Chung Jun (Note: Married to professional golfer Lydia Ko (리디아 고, 1997–)) 정준; 1997–	Sin U-taek 신우택; 1996–	Chung Jin-hui 정진희; 1996–	Chung Enoch 정장철; 2003–

Notes
In general: marriages indicated by dashed lines, female on the left.

Sources
- 김봄내 (15 May 2015). "[재벌가족사]정주영 현대그룹 창업주" [Chaebol Family History: Chung Ju-yung, founder of Hyundai Group]. KJtimes (in Korean).
- 김태현 (23 March 2015). "[단독보도] 정주영 막내딸 미국서 엄마 없이 결혼" [Exclusive: Chung Ju-yung's youngest daughter gets married without her mother in the United States]. 일요신문 (in Korean).
- "Family Drama". Forbes. 26 April 2011.
