= Chung Mong-joon =

South Korean businessman and politician (born 1951)

The Honourable Chung Mong-joon
- 정몽준
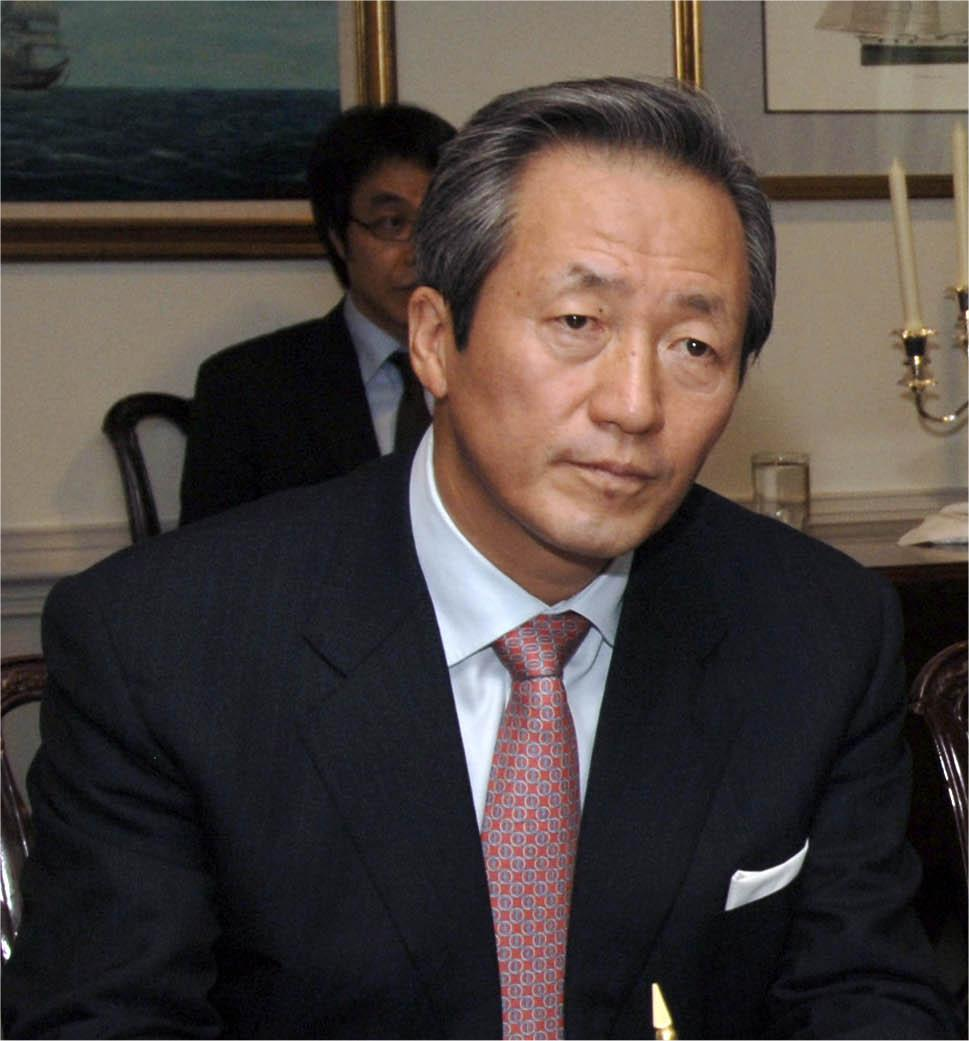
- Chung in 2008

Chairman of the Grand National Party
- In office 7 September 2009 – 3 June 2010
- Preceded by: Park Hee-tae
- Succeeded by: Kim Moo-sung (interim); Ahn Sang-soo

Member of the National Assembly
- In office 30 May 2008 – 15 May 2014
- Preceded by: Lee Kye-ahn
- Succeeded by: Na Kyung-won
- Constituency: Dongjak B (Seoul)
- In office 30 May 1988 – 29 May 2008
- Preceded by: New constituency
- Succeeded by: Ahn Hyo-dae
- Constituency: Dong (Ulsan)

Personal details
- Born: 15 November 1951 (age 74) Beomil-dong, Dong District, Busan, South Gyeongsang Province, South Korea
- Party: Independent (1988-1990, 1992, 2004-2007 and since 2016)
- Other political affiliations: Democratic Liberal Party (1990-1992); Unification National Party (1992-1993); National Integration 21 (2002-2004); Grand National/Saenuri (2007-2016)
- Spouse: Kim Young-Myeong
- Children: 4
- Education: Seoul National University (BA); Massachusetts Institute of Technology (MBA); Johns Hopkins University (PhD)
- Occupation: Politician; Business magnate; Vice president of FIFA

Korean name
- Hangul: 정몽준
- Hanja: 鄭夢準
- RR: Jeong Mongjun
- MR: Chŏng Mongjun

Chung Mong-joon (Korean: 정몽준, born November 15, 1951) is a South Korean businessman and politician. He is the sixth son of Chung Ju-yung, founder of Hyundai, the second-largest South Korean chaebol before its breakup in 2003. He remains the controlling shareholder of a Hyundai offshoot, Hyundai Heavy Industries Group, parent of the world's largest shipbuilding company. He is also the chairman of the board of the University of Ulsan and Ulsan College in Ulsan, South Korea. He is the founder and the honorary chairman of The Asan Institute for Policy Studies, and the honorary chairman of The Asan Nanum Foundation. He was vicepresident of FIFA and president of the South Korean football association.

He is among the richest people in South Korea. In May 2026, Forbes estimated his net worth at US$2.9 billion and ranked him 18th richest in the country.

== Political career and personal life ==
Chung became a politician when he was elected as an assembly man in 1988 and served consecutive 7 terms in two different electoral districts. Initially, he was elected in Dong District, Ulsan, where the predominant share of the population consisted of employees of the Hyundai Heavy Industries Group, its affiliated companies' employees, and their families. Most of other population in Dong District run businesses related with serving those workers and their families. Chung served as a representative of this particular district for 20 years. He joined the Grand National Party (GNP) in 2007 shortly before 2007 South Korean presidential election, declaring his support to that party's presidential candidate Lee Myung-bak. As a member of the GNP, he switched his electoral district to Dongjak District, Seoul, and represented there as an assembly man for 2 terms until 2014 when he had to give up that seat to run for mayor of Seoul, but the election was lost to Park Won-soon leaving no political titles for Chung after. Chung had announced his candidacy for FIFA president. However he was banned from all football activities for six years by FIFA Ethics Committee in October 2015. In 2018, the ban was reduced to 15 months by the Court of Arbitration for Sport due to "mitigating factors."

=== Presidential campaign of 2002 ===
In 2002, he ran for the presidency, but later gave up his candidacy supporting Millennium Democratic Party's candidate Roh Moo-hyun. Their coalition was motivated to prevent the GNP from winning the presidential election. South Korean regionalism became much more serious and antagonistic under President Kim Dae-jung's term. President Kim is the only South Korean president coming from Jeolla province, whereas all the other South Korean presidents since General Park Chung Hee's military coup in 1961 have been from Gyeongsang Province. Those of Koreans who despised Jeolla province supported the GNP, and the party exploited such sentiments for its political gains of denouncing President Kim and his government. Throughout President Kim' term, the GNP was accused by civil rights groups and media for instigating anti Jeolla sentiments. Chung and Roh Moo-hyun objected such self-destroying regionalism in South Korea, and advocated reconciliation between Jeolla and Gyeongsang provinces. Their coalition was intended to defeat the party which was seen to exploit regionalism.

Chung participated in Roh's presidential campaign up to the last day before the election on 19 December 2002. On the afternoon of 18 December, before the crowd of his supporters in Myeong-dong, Seoul, Roh suggested Chung Dong-young and Choo Mi-ae as viable choices of candidates for the next presidential race in 2007. Roh suggested those Democratic Party's politicians when he saw some of the crowd having slogans "Chung Mong-joon for the next presidential candidate" Roh's suggestion was not intended to exclude Chung as a presidential candidate, but to encourage and to praise his party's politicians in return to their supports to his presidential campaign. Several hours after this, Chung's spokeswoman officially announced Chung's withdrawal from supporting Roh. Roh's presidential camp was stunned by this, and Roh tried to allay Chung by visiting his home in person on the very last night before the presidential election, but Chung kept his front door closed and refused to see Roh. Nevertheless, Roh went on to win the election on the following day for the victory of all of those Koreans who wished to see regionalism end in South Korea.

Chung's joining of the GNP is an irony because his withdrawal from the presidential race in 2002 supporting Roh Moo-hyun was responsible for the GNP's failure in winning the presidential election. The party's candidate Lee Hoi-chang received absolute support from conservative or anti-Jeolla voters. By the help of Chung's withdrawal, the election became bipolar between Roh and Lee, and Roh turned out to be a winner receiving exclusive support from reform-minded Korean voters. The GNP had to wait another 5 years to produce a president from this defeat. Also his declaration to support Lee Myung-bak when he joined the GNP is seen as ironic. When Chung's father Chung Ju-yung ran for the presidency in 1992, Lee Myung-bak supported Kim Young-sam instead of Chung Ju-yung despite the fact that Lee made fortune and fame when he worked at Hyundai. Chung Ju-yung even bought him a luxurious house when Lee worked for Chung Ju-yung.

Chung's brother Chung Mong-hun, then the president of Hyundai Asan who pioneered South and North joint Mount Kumgang tour business, committed suicide on Aug 4, 2003 when he was investigated by prosecutors for his alleged $400 million cash remit to North Korea shortly before the 2000 North-South summit. Initially this suspicion was raised from US when Congressional Research Service reported such allegation from a CIA source on March 5, 2002. Upon hearing of such report, the GNP made use of this suspicion to attack the legitimacy of President Kim Dae-jung's government, and demanded thorough investigation through hearings and independent special prosecutors. Several weeks before leaving his office, President Kim gave an apology and advised no investigation for this matter for fear of aggravating North and South's relation, and Chung Mong-hun also confessed much of the allegations to public in his final attempt to evade investigation. But the GNP was resolute in its demand for formal investigation. Shortly after Roh's inauguration, the GNP passed the law entitling special prosecutors to investigate this case, taking advantage of its majority seats in National Assembly. Roh's administration wasn't able to refuse the demand of investigation, and Chung Mong-hun committed suicide when he was investigated about the use of $15 million worth of Korean won which was suspected to have been money laundered after its withdrawal from Hyundai's bank accounts. In fact, the money wasn't part of $400 million cash remittance to North Korea. North Korea blamed Grand National Party immediately after Chung Mong-hun's suicide. So Chung Mong-joon joined the party which could be considered to be responsible for his brother's death, but Chung blames President Roh instead. In his autobiography which was published in 2011, Chung argues that President Roh didn't refuse the GNP's demand of investigation because he believes Roh actually wanted to investigate his brother to revenge on his withdrawal of supporting Roh in 2002 presidential election. There is another ironical point behind Chung's joining of the GNP. The party tried to dig and disclose Chung's private life information to defame him in the 2002 presidential election These included his alleged prior diagnosis of mental disorder in school years, his cheating incidence during final exam in college years, questionable identity of his real mother, discredit of his Johns Hopkins University doctoral degree, etc.

Chung was known to be suspended and repeat courses for cheating final exam when he was a freshman in Seoul National University. He was caught by an exam monitor when he was peeping at some other classmate's exam over shoulder during final exam. He was reported to disciplinary committee and got such punishment after the incidence. Chung gave an excuse for this, saying he cheated final exam trying to finish it early to go out with his friends. Chung is the only known public figure in Korean history having such record.

Chung's real mother is unknown. When he ran for the South Korean presidency in 2002, the GNP explored this point. They speculated about the identity of Chung's real mother. They speculated that his real mother could be a house maid, a geisha, or a particular traditional musician whom Chung Ju-yung had an affair with. In fact, in his interview with news reporters in 2002, Chung indicated that his real mother is someone else, saying he would reveal the truth someday. It was reported that he was crying when he was questioned about his real mother. Chung explained about his real mother in his autobiography in 2011. Chung says that when he studied in US in 1978, he received a letter from someone in Korea who claimed to be his real mother. He hurried to return to Korea, and met her at her place, according to his autobiography. Chung said that it was the first and last time that he was going to see her.

=== Presidential campaign of 2012 ===
Shortly after he published his autobiography in 2011, some South Korean media reported an allegation that his shipbuilding company bought a large sum of his autobiography in order to make it known as a best seller. The media gathered that information after interviewing inside personnel, and found that Hyundai Heavy Industries Group distributed gift certificates to thousands of their employees to purchase Chung's autobiography. It was reported that they required employees to return the books along with receipts to the company after purchase, and added a special instruction not to purchase large volumes at once for fear of getting suspicions from public.

On top of publishing his autobiography, Chung also donated huge sums of money and set up a charity foundation in 2011, a year before 2012 presidential election. He contributed $200 million worth of Korean won from selling approximately 5% of his assets and established the Asan Sharing Foundation, which offers educational opportunities and financial assistance to young people from low income families. He said he funded it to commemorate his late father Chung Ju-yung, but many couldn't dismiss reasonable suspicion that his motivation was to impress the public before the presidential election. In fact, Chung didn't deny such suspicion, arguing that donation is supposed to good regardless of purpose.

Chung didn't think of Park Geun-hye as accomplished as himself before 2012 presidential election. When he decided to compete with Park, he said he was a better choice as a presidential candidate because of his educational background and work experience. When he pointed out Park's disadvantage, he argued that expertise of politics and economy is not something to be achieved in a short time. When Park wrote an article about North Korean issue in Foreign Affairs, Chung discredited it claiming someone else had written it under her name. Therefore, it was clear that he wouldn't miss 2012 presidential election. In 2012, he ran for the presidency, but only briefly. He was the first politician who submitted application for registration as a preliminary presidential candidate on May 1, 2012, but dropped out of the race in a couple of months. He wanted rule change for primary election so that general population choose party's presidential candidate, but he wasn't able to make this demand sound serious to the GNP, since Park's followers dominated and controlled the party. He gave up his candidacy and supported Park after. When he advertised Park at streets, he was saying to crowd that Park was prepared, and she was the one to take good care of economy and diplomacy.

Chung is losing popular support in South Korean politics now. When he ran for assemblyman in 2008, he received 54.41% of votes in Dongjak District, but for the following election in 2012, he just received 50.80% barely surviving to lose to the opposition candidate. When he ran for mayor of Seoul in 2014, he received 43.03% votes from Seoul residents, losing to then incumbent mayor of Seoul and previous civil rights activist Park Won-soon, who received 55% of the total vote. It turned out that Chung's electoral district, Dongjak voted only 41.80% for Chung whereas it gave 57.45% for Park.

== Education ==
- Graduated, Choongang High School
- Bachelor of Arts in Economics, Seoul National University
- Master of Business Administration, Sloan School of Management, Massachusetts Institute of Technology
- Doctor of Philosophy, School of Advanced International Studies, Johns Hopkins University

== Family ==
Chung family tree

Han Seong-sil 한성실 ? | Chung Bong-sik 정봉식 ?
Yung | Byun Joong-seok 변중석; 1921–2007 | Chung Ju-yung 정주영; 1915–2001 | Kim Kyung-hee 김경희; 1953– | Park Byeong-im 박병임; 1928–2015 | Chung Soon-yung 정순영; 1922–2005 | Park Young-ja 박영자; 1936– | Chung Se-yung 정세영; 1928–2005 | Jo Eun-ju 조은주; 1936– | Chung Sang-yung 정상영; 1936–2021
(영)
(Note: Given name terminates in -yung (영) for males and females in this generation) | Kim Wol-gye 김월계; 1923–2003 | Chung In-yung 정인영; 1920–2006 | Chung Hee-yung 정희영; 1925–2015 | Kim Young-joo 김영주; 1920–2010 | Jang Jeong-ja 장정자; 1935– | Chung Shin-yung 정신영; 1931–62
Chung Mong-pil (Note: Married to Lee Yang-ja (이양자; 1943–90)) 정몽필; 1934–82 | Chung Chung-in (Grace) 정정인; 1979– | Chung Chung-im (Elizabeth) 정정임; 1981– | Chung Hyeong-suk 정형숙; 1951–74 | Chung Moon-sook 정문숙; 1947– | Kim Yun-su 김윤수; 1946– | Chung Sook-young (Note: Married to Prof. Noh Kyung-soo (노경수; 1954–)) 정숙영; 1960– | Chung Il-kyung 정일경; 1960– | Chung Mong-hyuk 정몽혁; 1961–
Mong | Chung Mong-koo (Note: Married to Lee Jung-hwa (이정화; 1939–2009)) 정몽구; 1938– | Chung Mong-woo (Note: Married to Lee Haeng-ja (이행자; 1945–)) 정몽우; 1945–90 | Chung Mong-yoon (Note: Married to Kim Hye-young (김혜영; 1961–)) 정몽윤; 1955– | Chung Mong-guk (Note: Married to Lee Yoon-hee (이윤희; 1954–)) 정몽국; 1953– | Chung Mong-sun 정몽선; 1954– | Kim Geun-su 김근수; 1948– | Chung Mong-jin 정몽진; 1960– | Chung Mong-yeol 정몽열; 1964–
(몽)
(Note: Given name starts with Mong- (몽) for males in this generation. Female given names often start with Chung- (정), but not always.) | Chung Mong-kun (Note: Married to Woo Kyung-sook (우경숙; 1951–)) 정몽근; 1942– | Chung Mong-hun (Note: Married to Hyun Jeong-eun (현정은; 1955–)) 정몽헌; 1948–2003 | Chung Mong-il (Note: Married to Kwon Jun-hee (권준희; 1961–)) 정몽일; 1959– | Chung Mong-won (Note: Married to Hong In-hwa (홍인화; 1957–)) 정몽원; 1955– | Chung Mong-hoon 정몽훈; 1959– | Chung Chung-suk 정정숙; 1962– | Chung Mong-ik 정몽익; 1962–
Chung Kyung-hee (Note: Married to Jung Hee-young (정희영; 1940–)) 정경희; 1944– | Chung Mong-joon (Note: Married to Kim Young-myeong (김영명; 1956–)) 정몽준; 1951– | Chung Mong-seok 정몽석; 1958– | Chung Mong-yong 정몽용; 1961– | Chung Mong-gyu (Note: Married to Kim Na-young (김나영)) 정몽규; 1962– | Chung Yoo-kyung 정유경; 1970–
Chung Ji-yi 정지이; 1977– | Chung Young-yi 정영이; 1984– | Chung Young-seon 정영선; 1985– | Chung Hyeon-seon 정현선; 1989– | Chung Mun-yi 정문이; 1991–
Chung Il-seon 정일선; 1970– | Chung Moon-seon 정문선; 1974– | Chung Dae-seon (Note: Married to news anchor Noh Hyeon-jeong (노현정, 1979–)) 정대선; 1977– | Chung Chung-yi 정정이; 1984– | Chung Kyung-seon 정경선; 1986–
Seon
(선) | Chung Ji-seon 정지선; 1972– | Chung Gyo-seon 정교선; 1974– | Chung Kisun 정기선; 1982– | Chung Nam-yi 정남이; 1983– | Chung Seon-yi 정선이; 1986– | Chung Ye-seon 정예선; 1996–
(Note: Given name terminates in -seon (선) for males in this generation. Female given names usually terminate in -yi (이), but not always.)
Chung Eun-hee 정은희; 1971– | Chung Yu-hee 정유희; 1973– | Chung Seong-yi (Note: Married to Daejeon Sun Hospital chief director Seon Du-hun (선두훈, 1957–)) 정성이; 1962– | Chung Myeong-yi (Note: Married to Hyundai Card vice chairman Chung Tae-yeong (정태영, 1960–)) 정명이; 1964– | Chung Yoon-yi (Note: Formerly married to Samwoo vice-chairman Sin Seong-jae (신성재, 1968–)) 정윤이; 1968– | Chung Eui-seon (Note: Married to Chung Do-won's daughter Chung Ji-seon (정지선, 1970–)) 정의선; 1970–
Chung Sanghyeon 정상현; 2007– | Seon A-yeong (Note: Married to Gil Yong-wu's son Gil Seong-Jin (길성진, 1984–)) 선아영; 1987– | Seon Tong-uk (Note: Married to Chae Hyeong-seok's daughter Chae Su-yeon (채수연, 1990–)) 선동욱; 1989– | Sin U-jin 신우진; 1993– | Sin U-hyeon 신우현; 2004–
N/A
Chung Yun-hwi 정상현; 2013– | Chung Yu-mi 정유미; 1988– | Chung Yu-jin 정유진; 1990– | Chung Jun (Note: Married to professional golfer Lydia Ko (리디아 고, 1997–)) 정준; 1997– | Sin U-taek 신우택; 1996– | Chung Jin-hui 정진희; 1996– | Chung Enoch 정장철; 2003–

Notes
In general: marriages indicated by dashed lines, female on the left.

Sources
- 김봄내 (May 15, 2015). "[재벌가족사]정주영 현대그룹 창업주" [Chaebol Family History: Chung Ju-yung, founder of Hyundai Group]. KJtimes (in Korean).
- 김태현 (March 23, 2015). "[단독보도] 정주영 막내딸 미국서 엄마 없이 결혼" [Exclusive: Chung Ju-yung's youngest daughter gets married without her mother in the United States]. 일요신문 (in Korean).
- "Family Drama". Forbes. April 26, 2011.

== Election results ==
=== General elections ===
| Year | Elections | Constituency | Political party | Votes (%) | Results |
|---|---|---|---|---|---|
| 1988 | 13th National Assembly General Election | Ulsan Dong (South Gyeongsang) | Independent | 40,253 (54.35%) | Won |
| 1992 | 14th National Assembly General Election | Ulsan Dong (South Gyeongsang) | UNP | 61,263 (71.14%) | Won |
| 1996 | 15th National Assembly General Election | Ulsan Dong (South Gyeongsang) | Independent | 55,697 (71.00%) | Won |
| 2000 | 16th National Assembly General Election | Dong (Ulsan) | Independent | 51,346 (61.48%) | Won |
| 2004 | 17th National Assembly General Election | Dong (Ulsan) | National Integration 21 | 56,851 (65.22%) | Won |
| 2008 | 18th National Assembly General Election | Dongjak B (Seoul) | GNP | 47,521 (54.41%) | Won |
| 2012 | 19th National Assembly General Election | Dongjak B (Seoul) | Saenuri | 46,480 (50.80%) | Won |

=== Local elections ===
==== Mayor of Seoul ====
| Year | Elections | Constituency | Political party | Votes (%) | Remarks |
|---|---|---|---|---|---|
| 2014 | 6th Iocal Election | Seoul (Mayoral Elections) | Saenuri | 2,109,869 (43.03%) | Defeated (2nd) |

National Assembly of the Republic of Korea
| New constituency | Member of the Assembly for Dong (Ulsan); 30 May 1988–29 May 2008 | Succeeded by Ahn Hyo-dae |
| Preceded by Lee Kye-an | Member of the Assembly for Dongjak B (Seoul); 30 May 2008–15 May 2014 | Succeeded by Na Kyung-won |
Party political offices
| Preceded by Park Hee-tae | Chairman of the Grand National Party; 7 September 2009–3 June 2010 | Succeeded by Kim Moo-sung (Interim); Ahn Sang-soo |
