= Chung Mong-gyu =

Korean businessman (born 1961)

- 정몽규
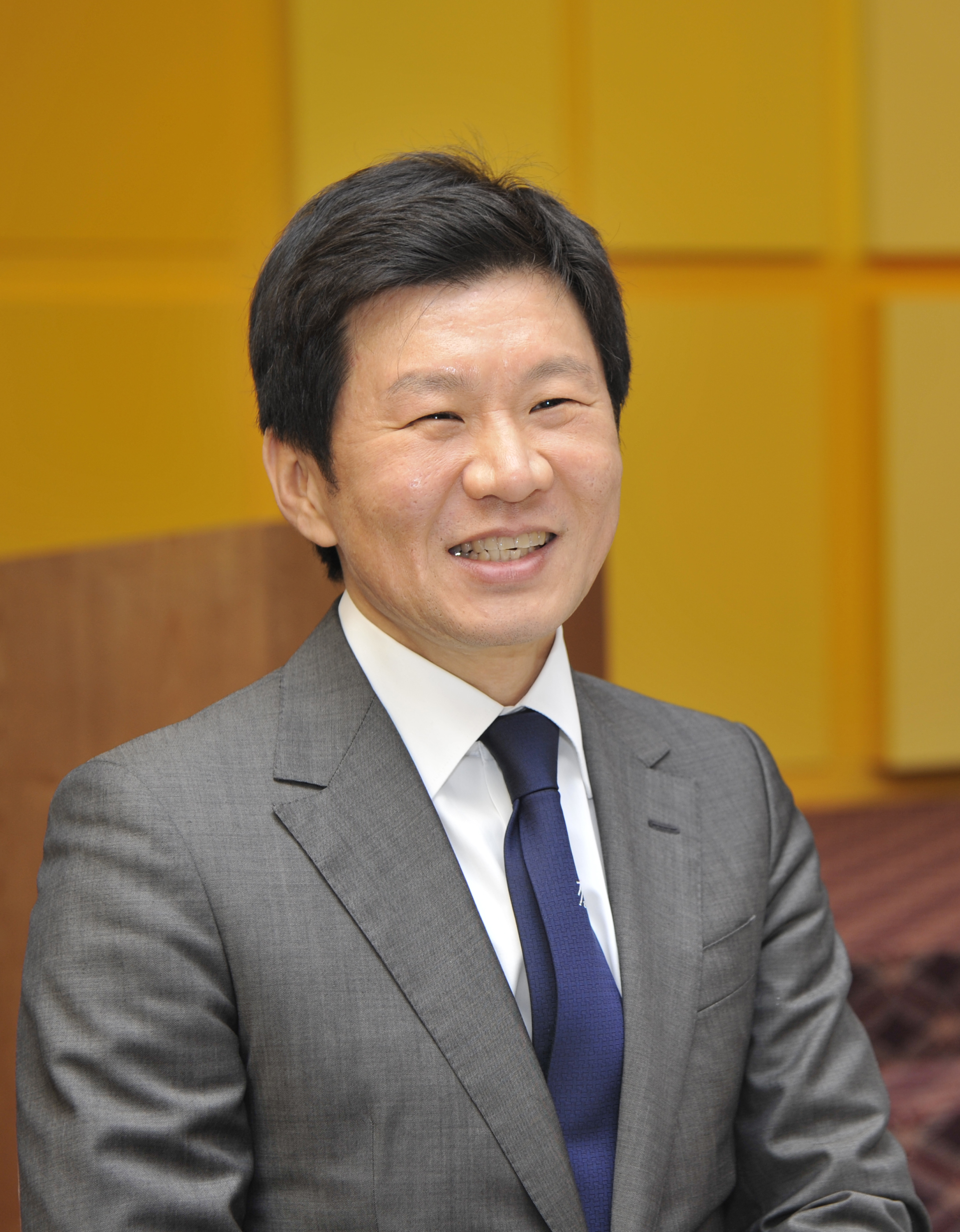
- Chung in 2012
- Born: January 14, 1961 (age 65); Seoul, South Korea
- Education: Korea University (BBA); University of Oxford (M.A.)
- Occupation: Chairman of HDC Group President of Korea Football Association President of East Asian Football Federation

Korean name
- Hangul: 정몽규
- Hanja: 鄭夢奎
- RR: Jeong Monggyu
- MR: Chŏng Monggyu

Chung Mong-gyu (Korean: 정몽규; born 1961) is a South Korean businessman. He is one of his country's top business leaders and chairman of HDC Group. Since 2013, he has served two consecutive terms as the 53rd president of the Korea Football Association (KFA). In May 2017, he won a seat on the FIFA Council. Chung received his bachelor's in business administration from Korea University in 1985, and completed his master's in politics, philosophy and economics at the University of Oxford in 1988. He was born in Seoul and is the son of Hyundai Motor Company co-founder Chung Se-yung.

== Education ==
Graduated from Yongsan High School in 1980. He then pursued his Bachelor's degree in business administration at Korea University in 1985. He received his Master's degree in politics, philosophy and economics from Oxford University in 1988.

== Chronology ==
Chung Mong-gyu joined Hyundai Motor Company in November 1988. He went on to serve as Chairman of Ulsan Hyundai FC from 1994 to 1996, and as Chairman of Hyundai Motor Company from 1996 to 1999. During 1997 to 1999, he also served as Chairman of Jeonbuk Hyundai Motors FC, President of the Korean Automobile Manufacturers Association, and Chairman of the Federation of Korean Industries (FKI) Korea-Britain Business Leaders Forum. In February 1999, he became Chairman of HDC Hyundai Development Company, a post he held until May 2018, and in 2000 assumed the chairmanship of Busan I'Park FC.

Since March 2000, he has served as a keynote speaker at the Pacific Basin Economic Council International General Meeting. In January 2011, Chung became President of the K League (Korea Professional Football League), serving until January 2013. He was a Member of the AFC Ad-Hoc Committee from April 2011 to March 2013.

From February 2013 to March 2014, he served as President of the East Asian Football Federation (EAFF), and from January 2013 to June 2016 as President of the Korea Football Association (KFA). He was a Member of the Organizing Committee for the FIFA Club World Cup from August 2013 to December 2016, and Vice President of EAFF from March 2014 onwards.

From May 2015 to May 2017, Chung served as a Member of the AFC Executive Committee. He has been a Member of the AFC Development Committee and Deputy Chairman of the 2019 AFC Asian Cup Organizing Committee since August 2015. In March 2016, he became Chairman of the 2017 FIFA U-20 World Cup Organizing Committee.

He served as Chef de Mission of 2016 Summer Olympics Team Korea from March to August 2016. In July 2016, he was reappointed as President of the KFA, and in September 2016 he became Vice President of the Asian Football Confederation (AFC) and Chair of the AFC Referees' Committee.

In January 2017, Chung was appointed Vice President of the Korean Sport & Olympic Committee. In May 2017, he became a Member of the FIFA Council. He was elected President of the East Asia Football Federation in April 2018, and became Chairman of HDC Holdings Co., Ltd. in May 2018.

Following South Korea's exit from the 2026 World Cup, Chung resigned as president of the Korea Football Association in July 2026, while retaining his international football positions as vice-chairman of FIFA's Commercial and Marketing Advisory Committee, with a term through 2029, and as the East Zone member of the Asian Football Confederation Executive Committee, whose terms runs through 2027.

== Career ==
Chung Mong-gyu served as chairman and CEO of Hyundai Motor Company from January 1996 to March 1999. He has managed Hyundai Development Company since his appointment as chairmanship in March 1999.

Hyundai Development Company, a parent entity of Hyundai Development Company Group, is a comprehensive construction company established in 1976 and has created more than 400,000 apartment units in Korea including Samsung-dong IPARK, Suwon IPARK CITY and Haeundae IPARK. In addition, Hyundai Development Company has been active in various areas such as city development, residential/commercial buildings, civil engineering and social infrastructure.

Hyundai Development Company has diversified its business areas to include manufacture, distribution, IT, leisure and service, with real estate & infrastructure construction as the center. The affiliates of Hyundai Development Company include Hyundai EP, I·Controls, I·Service, Hyundai IPARK Mall, Young Chang Music, I&CONS, Hotel IPARK, Hyundai PCE, IPARK Sports, HDC Asset Management and HDC Shilla Duty Free.

Through his engagement in IPARK Volunteer Corps, which was launched in 2004 as a social contribution committee of Hyundai Development Company, Chairman Chung has been actively promoting corporate social responsibility. In particular, with the establishment of Pony Chung Foundation, which is a nonprofit scholarship organization, he has been carrying out various programs such as Pony Chung Innovation Award, Academic Grants and Domestic/Overseas Scholarships.

Through his ownerships of Ulsan Hyundai FC (1994–1996), Jeonbuk Hyundai Motors FC (1997–1999) and Busan IPARK FC (2000–present), Chairman Chung has continuously supported the development of Korean Football industry.

Elected as the 9th President of the K League (Korean Professional Football League ) in 2011, he handled the match-fixing scandals with determination and acumen. In 2013, he was elected as the 52nd President of the Korea Football Association (KFA), a title being served for 2 consecutive terms since his reappointment as the 53rd President in 2016. In addition, he served as Vice President of East Asian Football Federation (EAFF) (2013–2014), Member of the Organizing Committee for the FIFA Club World Cup (2013–2016), Chef de Mission of 2016 Summer Olympics South Korea Team (2016) and Member of Asian Football Confederation (AFC) Executive Committee (2015-2017).

His current roles include Deputy Chairman of 2019 AFC Asian Cup Organizing Committee (2015–present), Member of AFC Development Committee (2015–present), Chairman of 2017 FIFA U-20 World Cup Organizing Committee (2016–present), Chairperson of AFC Referees' Committee (2016–present), Vice President of AFC (2016–present), Vice President of Korean Sport & Olympic Committee (2017–present) and Member of FIFA Council (2017–present). Since his joining the FIFA Council, Chairman Chung has been devoting his efforts to co-hosting the 2030 FIFA World Cup with China, Japan and North Korea.

== Awards ==
- 1997 Winner of the 2nd Korea-China Young Researcher's Award (economics segment)
- 1997 "100 Global Leaders of Tomorrow" by the World Economic Forum

== Family ==
Chung family tree

Han Seong-sil 한성실 ?	Chung Bong-sik 정봉식 ?
Yung	Byun Joong-seok 변중석; 1921–2007	Chung Ju-yung 정주영; 1915–2001	Kim Kyung-hee 김경희; 1953–	Park Byeong-im 박병임; 1928–2015	Chung Soon-yung 정순영; 1922–2005	Park Young-ja 박영자; 1936–	Chung Se-yung 정세영; 1928–2005	Jo Eun-ju 조은주; 1936–	Chung Sang-yung 정상영; 1936–2021
(영)
(Note: Given name terminates in -yung (영) for males and females in this generation)	Kim Wol-gye 김월계; 1923–2003	Chung In-yung 정인영; 1920–2006	Chung Hee-yung 정희영; 1925–2015	Kim Young-joo 김영주; 1920–2010	Jang Jeong-ja 장정자; 1935–	Chung Shin-yung 정신영; 1931–62
Chung Mong-pil (Note: Married to Lee Yang-ja (이양자; 1943–90)) 정몽필; 1934–82	Chung Chung-in (Grace) 정정인; 1979–	Chung Chung-im (Elizabeth) 정정임; 1981–	Chung Hyeong-suk 정형숙; 1951–74	Chung Moon-sook 정문숙; 1947–	Kim Yun-su 김윤수; 1946–	Chung Sook-young (Note: Married to Prof. Noh Kyung-soo (노경수; 1954–)) 정숙영; 1960–	Chung Il-kyung 정일경; 1960–	Chung Mong-hyuk 정몽혁; 1961–
Mong	Chung Mong-koo (Note: Married to Lee Jung-hwa (이정화; 1939–2009)) 정몽구; 1938–	Chung Mong-woo (Note: Married to Lee Haeng-ja (이행자; 1945–)) 정몽우; 1945–90	Chung Mong-yoon (Note: Married to Kim Hye-young (김혜영; 1961–)) 정몽윤; 1955–	Chung Mong-guk (Note: Married to Lee Yoon-hee (이윤희; 1954–)) 정몽국; 1953–	Chung Mong-sun 정몽선; 1954–	Kim Geun-su 김근수; 1948–	Chung Mong-jin 정몽진; 1960–	Chung Mong-yeol 정몽열; 1964–
(몽)
(Note: Given name starts with Mong- (몽) for males in this generation. Female given names often start with Chung- (정), but not always.)	Chung Mong-kun (Note: Married to Woo Kyung-sook (우경숙; 1951–)) 정몽근; 1942–	Chung Mong-hun (Note: Married to Hyun Jeong-eun (현정은; 1955–)) 정몽헌; 1948–2003	Chung Mong-il (Note: Married to Kwon Jun-hee (권준희; 1961–)) 정몽일; 1959–	Chung Mong-won (Note: Married to Hong In-hwa (홍인화; 1957–)) 정몽원; 1955–	Chung Mong-hoon 정몽훈; 1959–	Chung Chung-suk 정정숙; 1962–	Chung Mong-ik 정몽익; 1962–
Chung Kyung-hee (Note: Married to Jung Hee-young (정희영; 1940–)) 정경희; 1944–	Chung Mong-joon (Note: Married to Kim Young-myeong (김영명; 1956–)) 정몽준; 1951–	Chung Mong-seok 정몽석; 1958–	Chung Mong-yong 정몽용; 1961–	Chung Mong-gyu (Note: Married to Kim Na-young (김나영)) 정몽규; 1962–	Chung Yoo-kyung 정유경; 1970–
Chung Ji-yi 정지이; 1977–	Chung Young-yi 정영이; 1984–	Chung Young-seon 정영선; 1985–	Chung Hyeon-seon 정현선; 1989–	Chung Mun-yi 정문이; 1991–
Chung Il-seon 정일선; 1970–	Chung Moon-seon 정문선; 1974–	Chung Dae-seon (Note: Married to news anchor Noh Hyeon-jeong (노현정, 1979–)) 정대선; 1977–	Chung Chung-yi 정정이; 1984–	Chung Kyung-seon 정경선; 1986–
Seon
(선)	Chung Ji-seon 정지선; 1972–	Chung Gyo-seon 정교선; 1974–	Chung Kisun 정기선; 1982–	Chung Nam-yi 정남이; 1983–	Chung Seon-yi 정선이; 1986–	Chung Ye-seon 정예선; 1996–
(Note: Given name terminates in -seon (선) for males in this generation. Female given names usually terminate in -yi (이), but not always.)
Chung Eun-hee 정은희; 1971–	Chung Yu-hee 정유희; 1973–	Chung Seong-yi (Note: Married to Daejeon Sun Hospital chief director Seon Du-hun (선두훈, 1957–)) 정성이; 1962–	Chung Myeong-yi (Note: Married to Hyundai Card vice chairman Chung Tae-yeong (정태영, 1960–)) 정명이; 1964–	Chung Yoon-yi (Note: Formerly married to Samwoo vice-chairman Sin Seong-jae (신성재, 1968–)) 정윤이; 1968–	Chung Eui-seon (Note: Married to Chung Do-won's daughter Chung Ji-seon (정지선, 1970–)) 정의선; 1970–
Chung Sanghyeon 정상현; 2007–	Seon A-yeong (Note: Married to Gil Yong-wu's son Gil Seong-Jin (길성진, 1984–)) 선아영; 1987–	Seon Tong-uk (Note: Married to Chae Hyeong-seok's daughter Chae Su-yeon (채수연, 1990–)) 선동욱; 1989–	Sin U-jin 신우진; 1993–	Sin U-hyeon 신우현; 2004–
N/A
Chung Yun-hwi 정상현; 2013–	Chung Yu-mi 정유미; 1988–	Chung Yu-jin 정유진; 1990–	Chung Jun (Note: Married to professional golfer Lydia Ko (리디아 고, 1997–)) 정준; 1997–	Sin U-taek 신우택; 1996–	Chung Jin-hui 정진희; 1996–	Chung Enoch 정장철; 2003–

Notes
In general: marriages indicated by dashed lines, female on the left.

Sources
- 김봄내 (May 15, 2015). "[재벌가족사]정주영 현대그룹 창업주" [Chaebol Family History: Chung Ju-yung, founder of Hyundai Group]. KJtimes (in Korean).
- 김태현 (March 23, 2015). "[단독보도] 정주영 막내딸 미국서 엄마 없이 결혼" [Exclusive: Chung Ju-yung's youngest daughter gets married without her mother in the United States]. 일요신문 (in Korean).
- "Family Drama". Forbes. April 26, 2011.
