= Chung Eui-sun =

South Korean business magnate (born 1970)

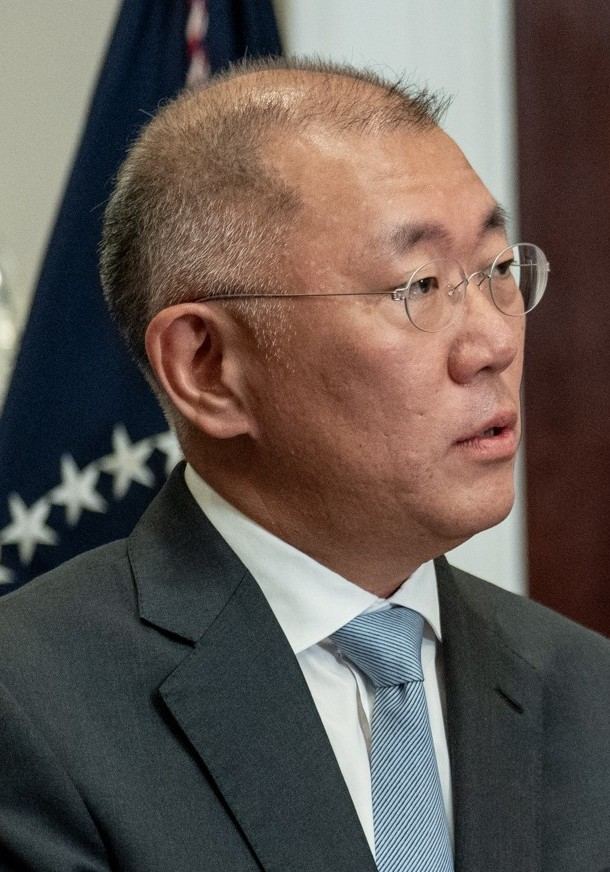
- Chung in 2025
- Born: 18 October 1970 (age 55); South Korea
- Education: Korea University (BBA); University of San Francisco (MBA)
- Title: Executive chairman and chief executive officer of Hyundai Motor Group
- Children: 2
- Father: Chung Mong-koo

Korean name
- Hangul: 정의선
- Hanja: 鄭義宣
- RR: Jeong Uiseon
- MR: Chŏng Ŭisŏn

Chung Eui-sun (Korean: 정의선; born 18 October 1970), anglicized as Euisun Chung, is a South Korean billionaire business executive. He is the executive chairman of Hyundai Motor Group and executive chairman and one of three chief executive officers of Hyundai Motor Company, and the only son and "heir apparent" of Hyundai Motor Group honorary chairman Chung Mong-koo.

He is among the richest people in South Korea. In August 2026, Forbes estimated his net worth as US$5.8 billion and ranked him 9th richest in the country.

== Education ==
Chung was educated at Whimoon High School and received a bachelor's degree in business administration from Korea University in 1993. After graduation from Korea University, he earned an MBA from the University of San Francisco School of Business in 1997.

== Career ==
- 2020–present: Executive Chairman and CEO, Hyundai Motor Group
- 2018–2020: Executive Vice Chairman, Hyundai Motor Group
- 2009–2018: Vice Chairman, Hyundai Motor Company
- 2005–2009: President, Kia Motors Corporation (sister company of Hyundai Motor)
- 2003–2005: Chief Operating Officer, Hyundai-Kia Corporate Planning Division
- 2001–2002: Deputy Operating Officer, Hyundai Motor's Domestic Sales & Marketing Division
- 2001–2002: Deputy Operating Officer, Hyundai-Kia After-Sales Service Division
- 2000–2002: Deputy Operating Officer, Hyundai Information Technology Center
- 1999–2001: Director, Hyundai Procurement Planning & Coordination Group
- 1994–1999: Deputy Manager, Hyundai Precision and Industries Ltd. (San Francisco, US)
- 1997–1999: Itochu Corporation (New York, US)

From 2005 to 2009, Chung was the president of Kia Motors Corp, a subsidiary of Hyundai Motor, which owns 34% of Kia. According to Forbes, Chung is credited with the success of the Kia Cee'd in Europe along with the Soul and the Forte.

In October 2020, Chung became chairman of Hyundai Motor Group, and his father, Chung Mong-Koo, honorary chairman.

Chung is World Archery Asia president. He is currently on his fifth consecutive term as president.

== Awards and honors ==
- 2003: Commendation by the President of the Republic of Korea
- 2006: World Economic Forum, Young Global Leader
- 2005–present: Asian Archery Federation, President
- 2023: Honorary Commander of the Order of the British Empire

== Personal life ==
Chung is married, with two children, and lives in Seoul, South Korea.

=== Family ===
Chung family tree

Han Seong-sil 한성실 ?	Chung Bong-sik 정봉식 ?
Yung	Byun Joong-seok 변중석; 1921–2007	Chung Ju-yung 정주영; 1915–2001	Kim Kyung-hee 김경희; 1953–	Park Byeong-im 박병임; 1928–2015	Chung Soon-yung 정순영; 1922–2005	Park Young-ja 박영자; 1936–	Chung Se-yung 정세영; 1928–2005	Jo Eun-ju 조은주; 1936–	Chung Sang-yung 정상영; 1936–2021
(영)
(Note: Given name terminates in -yung (영) for males and females in this generation)	Kim Wol-gye 김월계; 1923–2003	Chung In-yung 정인영; 1920–2006	Chung Hee-yung 정희영; 1925–2015	Kim Young-joo 김영주; 1920–2010	Jang Jeong-ja 장정자; 1935–	Chung Shin-yung 정신영; 1931–62
Chung Mong-pil (Note: Married to Lee Yang-ja (이양자; 1943–90)) 정몽필; 1934–82	Chung Chung-in (Grace) 정정인; 1979–	Chung Chung-im (Elizabeth) 정정임; 1981–	Chung Hyeong-suk 정형숙; 1951–74	Chung Moon-sook 정문숙; 1947–	Kim Yun-su 김윤수; 1946–	Chung Sook-young (Note: Married to Prof. Noh Kyung-soo (노경수; 1954–)) 정숙영; 1960–	Chung Il-kyung 정일경; 1960–	Chung Mong-hyuk 정몽혁; 1961–
Mong	Chung Mong-koo (Note: Married to Lee Jung-hwa (이정화; 1939–2009)) 정몽구; 1938–	Chung Mong-woo (Note: Married to Lee Haeng-ja (이행자; 1945–)) 정몽우; 1945–90	Chung Mong-yoon (Note: Married to Kim Hye-young (김혜영; 1961–)) 정몽윤; 1955–	Chung Mong-guk (Note: Married to Lee Yoon-hee (이윤희; 1954–)) 정몽국; 1953–	Chung Mong-sun 정몽선; 1954–	Kim Geun-su 김근수; 1948–	Chung Mong-jin 정몽진; 1960–	Chung Mong-yeol 정몽열; 1964–
(몽)
(Note: Given name starts with Mong- (몽) for males in this generation. Female given names often start with Chung- (정), but not always.)	Chung Mong-kun (Note: Married to Woo Kyung-sook (우경숙; 1951–)) 정몽근; 1942–	Chung Mong-hun (Note: Married to Hyun Jeong-eun (현정은; 1955–)) 정몽헌; 1948–2003	Chung Mong-il (Note: Married to Kwon Jun-hee (권준희; 1961–)) 정몽일; 1959–	Chung Mong-won (Note: Married to Hong In-hwa (홍인화; 1957–)) 정몽원; 1955–	Chung Mong-hoon 정몽훈; 1959–	Chung Chung-suk 정정숙; 1962–	Chung Mong-ik 정몽익; 1962–
Chung Kyung-hee (Note: Married to Jung Hee-young (정희영; 1940–)) 정경희; 1944–	Chung Mong-joon (Note: Married to Kim Young-myeong (김영명; 1956–)) 정몽준; 1951–	Chung Mong-seok 정몽석; 1958–	Chung Mong-yong 정몽용; 1961–	Chung Mong-gyu (Note: Married to Kim Na-young (김나영)) 정몽규; 1962–	Chung Yoo-kyung 정유경; 1970–
Chung Ji-yi 정지이; 1977–	Chung Young-yi 정영이; 1984–	Chung Young-seon 정영선; 1985–	Chung Hyeon-seon 정현선; 1989–	Chung Mun-yi 정문이; 1991–
Chung Il-seon 정일선; 1970–	Chung Moon-seon 정문선; 1974–	Chung Dae-seon (Note: Married to news anchor Noh Hyeon-jeong (노현정, 1979–)) 정대선; 1977–	Chung Chung-yi 정정이; 1984–	Chung Kyung-seon 정경선; 1986–
Seon
(선)	Chung Ji-seon 정지선; 1972–	Chung Gyo-seon 정교선; 1974–	Chung Kisun 정기선; 1982–	Chung Nam-yi 정남이; 1983–	Chung Seon-yi 정선이; 1986–	Chung Ye-seon 정예선; 1996–
(Note: Given name terminates in -seon (선) for males in this generation. Female given names usually terminate in -yi (이), but not always.)
Chung Eun-hee 정은희; 1971–	Chung Yu-hee 정유희; 1973–	Chung Seong-yi (Note: Married to Daejeon Sun Hospital chief director Seon Du-hun (선두훈, 1957–)) 정성이; 1962–	Chung Myeong-yi (Note: Married to Hyundai Card vice chairman Chung Tae-yeong (정태영, 1960–)) 정명이; 1964–	Chung Yoon-yi (Note: Formerly married to Samwoo vice-chairman Sin Seong-jae (신성재, 1968–)) 정윤이; 1968–	Chung Eui-seon (Note: Married to Chung Do-won's daughter Chung Ji-seon (정지선, 1970–)) 정의선; 1970–
Chung Sanghyeon 정상현; 2007–	Seon A-yeong (Note: Married to Gil Yong-wu's son Gil Seong-Jin (길성진, 1984–)) 선아영; 1987–	Seon Tong-uk (Note: Married to Chae Hyeong-seok's daughter Chae Su-yeon (채수연, 1990–)) 선동욱; 1989–	Sin U-jin 신우진; 1993–	Sin U-hyeon 신우현; 2004–
N/A
Chung Yun-hwi 정상현; 2013–	Chung Yu-mi 정유미; 1988–	Chung Yu-jin 정유진; 1990–	Chung Jun (Note: Married to professional golfer Lydia Ko (리디아 고, 1997–)) 정준; 1997–	Sin U-taek 신우택; 1996–	Chung Jin-hui 정진희; 1996–	Chung Enoch 정장철; 2003–

Notes
In general: marriages indicated by dashed lines, female on the left.

Sources
- 김봄내 (May 15, 2015). "[재벌가족사]정주영 현대그룹 창업주" [Chaebol Family History: Chung Ju-yung, founder of Hyundai Group]. KJtimes (in Korean).
- 김태현 (March 23, 2015). "[단독보도] 정주영 막내딸 미국서 엄마 없이 결혼" [Exclusive: Chung Ju-yung's youngest daughter gets married without her mother in the United States]. 일요신문 (in Korean).
- "Family Drama". Forbes. April 26, 2011.

== See also ==
- Chaebol
