= Asan Nanum Foundation =

South Korean nonprofit organization

- 아산나눔재단
- Formation: October 2011; 15 years ago
- Type: Nonprofit organization
- Location: Seoul, South Korea
- Chairman: Eom Yoon-mi
- Honorary chairman: Chung Mong-joon
- Website: asan-nanum.org

The Asan Nanum Foundation (Korean: 아산나눔재단) is a South Korean nonprofit organization established in 2011 in honor of Chung Ju-yung, the founder of Hyundai Group. The foundation is headquartered in Jung District, Seoul, South Korea, and focuses on promoting entrepreneurship education.

As of 2024, the foundation has facilitated the formation of ₩2.1 trillion (approximately US$1.6 billion) in funds. It has three startup incubation facilities — Maru 180 and Maru 360 in Yeoksam-dong and Maru SF in San Mateo.

== History ==
The Asan Nanum Foundation was established in October 2011 to commemorate the 10th anniversary of the death of Hyundai Group founder Chung Ju-yung. "Asan" is Ju-yung's art name. The foundation's initial funding was primarily provided by various companies in the Hyundai conglomerate and Chung Mong-joon.

In 2012, the foundation established the Chung Ju-yung Angel Investment Fund with an initial capital of ₩100 billion (US$75 million). With entrepreneurship competitions, the flagship fund invests in startups alongside angel investors, accelerators, and venture capitalists.

The foundation launched startup incubation centers Maru 180 in April 2014 and Maru 360 in November 2021.

In December 2024, the foundation announced Maru SF, a San Mateo, California-based facility, to support Korean startups expanding into the United States.
