= Hyundai Enercell =

Hyundai Enercell is an auto parts company, headquartered in Seoul, South Korea. It was established in 1977 by its old name Kyungwon Industry, as sold as Hyundai Motor Group in 1999. The battery brand name is Solite.

The informally known as Solite Batteries, is a privately owned company that markets automotive batteries manufactured by Hyundai Motor Group through a system of local and worldwide independent distributors. These distributors Hyundai Mobis service dealers that mainly include car dealerships and repair shops. Recently, they've started to open "All Battery Centers" which sell batteries for different electronic and cordless devices as well as those for Hyundai and Kia cars and Battery make based in Ulsan Plant.

== See also ==
- Chemical
- Economy of South Korea
