= Kwan-wook Park =

South Korean artist

- Hangul: 박관욱
- RR: Bak Gwanuk
- MR: Pak Kwanuk

Kwan-Wook Park is a contemporary South Korean artist whose largest show to date was at the Gallery Hyundai in 1999. His iconography includes various pop culture elements such as Mickey Mouse as well as abstract styles and organic materials such as rocks and semi-precious gemstones. Since then, also he deals with the themes base upon many contradictory facets of modern society along with the using of various materials which are aesthetical portion of his concept on art. Recently his works lean on more of linguistic side than conventional pursuing on pure art making. Yet it might be said that he regards himself as a landscape-painter who symbolizes things and depicting language per se, at these days of sublime absurdities.
