= Hyundai Mobis =

South Korean company

Hyundai Mobis Company Limited
- Native name: 현대모비스
- Formerly: Hyundai Precision Industry Company Limited (1977–2000)
- Type: Public
- Traded as: KRX: 012330; S&P Asia 50 component
- Industry: Automotive
- Founded: June 25, 1977; 49 years ago
- Headquarters: Seoul, South Korea
- Area served: Worldwide
- Key people: Chung Mong-koo (Founder); Chung Eui-sun (Chairman); Kyu Suk Lee (President & CEO)
- Products: Automotive parts, Mobility System & Solutions
- Revenue: ▼ ₩57.237 trillion (2024)
- Operating income: ▲ ₩3.0735 trillion (2024)
- Net income: ▲ ₩4.0602 trillion (2024)
- Total assets: ▲ ₩66.5969 trillion (2024)
- Total equity: ▲ ₩46.1182 trillion (2024)
- Owners: Kia Corporation (17.66%); National Pension Service (8.62%); Chung Mong-koo (7.29%); Hyundai Steel (5.92%); Mirae Asset Financial Group (5.20%); Treasury stock (3.64%); (Note: As of 9 April 2025)
- Number of employees: 46,183 (2023)
- Parent: Hyundai Motor Group
- Subsidiaries: Ulsan Hyundai Mobis Phoebus
- Website: www.mobis.com

- Hyundai Mobis
- Hangul: 현대모비스
- Hanja: 現代모비스
- RR: Hyeondae Mobiseu
- MR: Hyŏndae Mobisŭ

Hyundai Mobis Company Limited (Korean: 현대모비스), commonly known as Hyundai Mobis (Note: "Mobis" is a blend word from "Mobile" and "System"), is a public South Korean car parts company which is a member of Hyundai Motor Group. Founded in 1977, the company currently forms the "parts and service" arm for the South Korean automakers Hyundai Motor Company, Genesis Motors and Kia Motors. As of 2025, it was the "world's No. 6 automotive supplier".

== History ==
Headquartered in Seoul, South Korea, it was founded on June 25, 1977 as "Korea Precision Industry", then to Hyundai Precision Industry (Korean: 현대정공; Hanja: 現代精工) a few days later on July 1. In 2000, the company changed its name to Hyundai Mobis.

In June 2023, the company ranked #464 on the Forbes Global 2000, with a market cap of US $15.14 billion. In 2015, it had revenues of $32.11 billion.

== Products ==
The company offers chassis, cockpit, and front-end modules; safety products, including airbags; headlights; anti-lock brake system and electronic stability control products; steering parts; multimedia in-car entertainment systems; Kia Connect systems; injection-molded plastic parts, such as instrument panels, carriers, and bumpers; and steel wheel rims and decks. It also supplies after-sales service parts for vehicles. Concentrating its resources on A/S parts sales, module parts manufacture and parts export, Hyundai MOBIS has firmly established its position as the leading auto parts specialist company.

== Car production ==
In the 1990s, Hyundai Precision produced the Hyundai Galloper and Santamo cars at the Ulsan plant next to Giant Hyundai motor complex. Hyundai motor Ulsan complex was at that time the world's single largest motor plant of 1.5 million units production capacity.

I.E 5 assembly plant of 30,000 car production annual capacity since 2000s, but production shifted to the Hyundai Motor Company in 1999.

== See also ==
- Ulsan Hyundai Mobis Phoebus
