= Hyundai Cement =

Cement company of South Korea

Hanil Hyundai Cement Co., Ltd. is a cement and concrete company headquartered in Seoul, South Korea, established in 1969. It is a manufacturer of portland cement.

== See also ==
- Economy of South Korea
