= Hyun Jeong-eun =

South Korean business executive (born 1955)

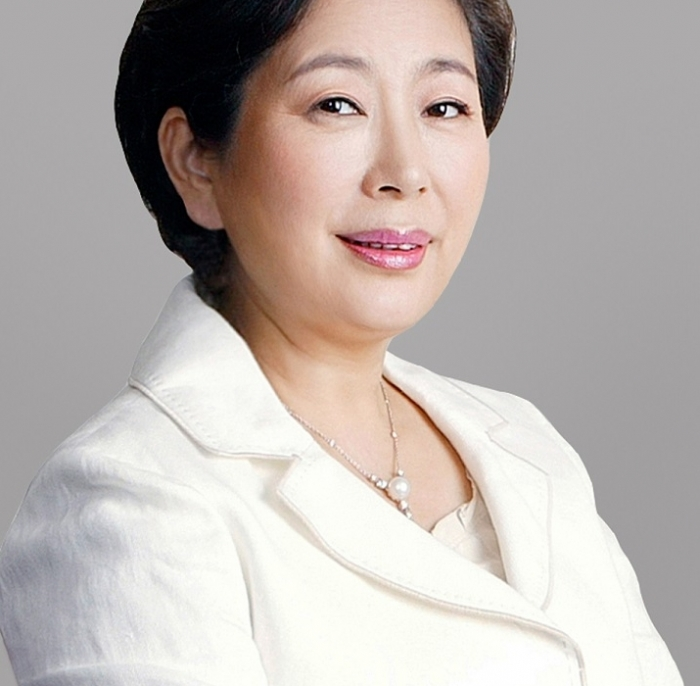
- Hyun in 2021
- Born: 26 January 1955 (age 71); South Korea
- Occupation: Chairwoman of Hyundai Group
- Spouse: Chung Mong-hun
- Children: Chung Ji-yi; Chung Young-yi; Chung Young-seon

Korean name
- Hangul: 현정은
- Hanja: 玄貞恩
- RR: Hyeon Jeongeun
- MR: Hyŏn Chŏngŭn

Hyun Jeong-eun (Korean: 현정은; born 26 January 1955) is a South Korean businesswoman and the chairwoman of the Hyundai Group.

== Education ==
Hyun Jeong-eun graduated from Kyunggi Girls' High School in 1972. She earned a Bachelor of Arts in Sociology in 1976 and a Master of Arts in Sociology in 1979 from Ewha Womans University. She later obtained a Master of Arts in Human Development from Fairleigh Dickinson University in 1983.

== Biography ==
Hyun Jeong-eun was born on January 26, 1955, as the second daughter among four daughters to her father, Hyun Young-won, and her mother, Kim Moon-hee. In 1976, she married Chung Mong-hun, with whom she had one son and two daughters.

On August 4, 2003, her husband Chung Mong-hun died and she succeeded him and was inaugurated as the new chairwoman of the Hyundai Group on October 21, 2003.

On August 16, 2009, in her capacity as chairwoman of the Hyundai Group, she met with Kim Jong Il, the then leader of North Korea. The politician Kim Moo-sung is her maternal uncle.

== Career ==
- 1983~1998 Korea Girl Scout Association, Member of International Committee & National Development Committee
- 1988~1991 Korea Association of Univ. Women, Member of Financial Committee
- 1998~2007 Korea Girl Scout Association, Director of National Headquarters
- 2005~2008 Member of the Presidential Committee on Government Innovation and Decentralization
- 2006~2008 The Civil Service Commission, Member of the Advisory Council on Personnel Policy
- 2011~2019 Embassy of Brazil in Korea, Honorary Consul
- 2013~2025 Ewha Haktang, Director
- 2019~2021 National Unification Advisory Council, Vice Chairperson
- 1999~ Korea National Red Cross, Member of Special Advisory Council in the Women Volunteer’s Community
- 2003~ Hyundai Group, Chairman
- 2013~ Seoul Chamber of Commerce and Industry, Vice Chairman
- 2019~ The National Trust for Cultural Heritage, Director
- 2020~ North Chungcheong Province, Honorary Governor

== Awards and honors ==
- 2006 Received Pinnacle Award from Fairleigh Dickinson Univ.
- 2006 Received a ‘21st Century CEO’ Award from Ewha Univ.
- 2009 Received a ‘Proud Kyunggi Alumni Award’ from Kyunggi Girls’ High School
- 2010 Received a ‘Person of the Year Award’ form the Women’s News
- 2010 Received a ‘Kim Hwal-Ran Women Leaders Award’ from Korean National Council of Women
- 2012 Named ‘MK Economy’s CEO of the Year 2012’
- 2012 Listed in the ‘Forbes Asia list of 50 top Asian businesswomen’
- 2013 Received a ‘Proud Ewha Alumni Award’ from Ewha Univ.
- 2013 Received the Order of ‘Rio Branco’ from the Brazilian Government
- 2015 Received Gold Tower Order of Industrial Service Merit from the Korean Government
