= Hyundai Group =

South Korean conglomerate

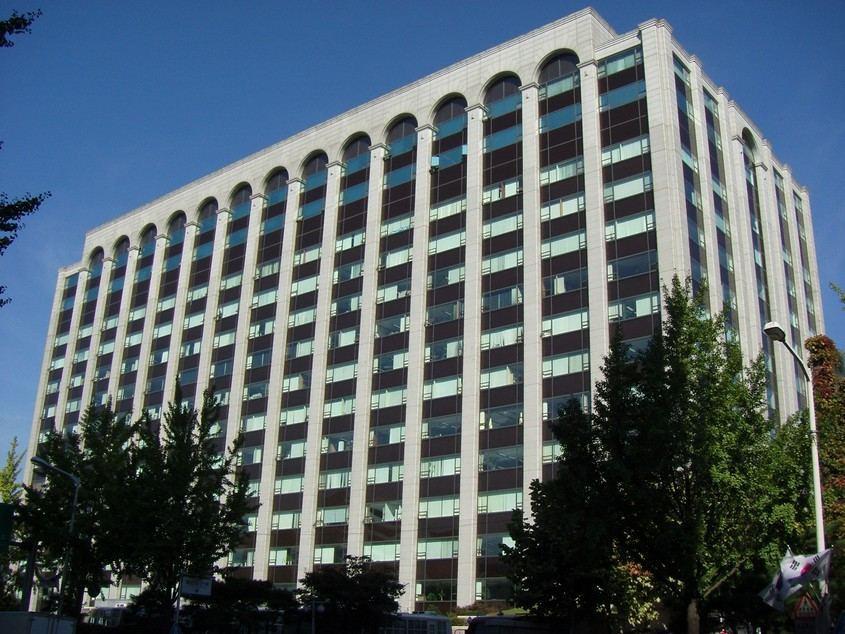
- Headquarters of Hyundai in Seoul, South Korea
- Founded: 1947; 79 years ago
- Founder: Chung Ju-yung
- Headquarters: Hyundai Group Building, 194 Yulgok-ro, Jongno-gu, Seoul, South Korea
- Key people: Hyun Jeong-eun (Chairperson)

Korean name
- Hangul: 현대그룹
- Hanja: 現代그룹
- RR: Hyeondae geurup
- MR: Hyŏndae kŭrup
- Website: www.hyundaigroup.com

Hyundai Group (Korean: 현대그룹; Korean pronunciation: [ˈçjəːndɛ]) is a South Korean conglomerate founded by Chung Ju-yung. The group was founded in 1947 as a construction company. With government assistance, Chung and his family members rapidly expanded into various industries, eventually becoming South Korea's second chaebol. Chung Ju-yung was directly in control of the company until his death in 2001.

The company spun off many of its better known businesses after the 1997 Asian financial crisis and founder Chung Ju-yung's death, including Hyundai Motor Group, Hyundai Department Store Group, and Hyundai Heavy Industries Group. The Hyundai Group is now primarily focused on logistics and services.

== Etymology ==
The name "Hyundai" comes from the Korean word 현대 (Hanja: 現代), meaning "modernity".

== History ==
In 1947, Hyundai Togun (Hyundai Engineering and Construction), the initial company of the Hyundai Group, was established by Chung Ju-yung. Their initial capital comes from contracts with the U.S. Army in post-colonial Korea, building military bases under U.S. jurisdiction. Hyundai Construction began operating outside of South Korea in 1965, entering the markets of Guam, Thailand and Vietnam. In 1950, Hyundai Togun was renamed Hyundai Construction. In 1958, Keumkang Company was established to make construction materials. In 1965, Hyundai Construction began its first overseas venture, a highway project in Thailand.

In 1967, Hyundai Motors was established. Hyundai Heavy Industries was founded in 1973, and completed the construction of its first ships in June 1974. In 1975, the group began construction on an integrated car factory and launched a new Korean vehicle. In 1973, the group's shipyard was incorporated as Hyundai Shipbuilding and Heavy Industries and renamed Hyundai Heavy Industries in 1978. In 1976, Hyundai Corporation was established as a trading arm. The same year, Asia Merchant Marine Co. established, later renamed Hyundai Merchant Marine. In 1977, Asan Foundation was established. In 1983 Hyundai entered the semiconductor industry through the establishment of Hyundai Electronics (renamed Hynix in 2001). In 1986, Hyundai Research Institute was established.

In 1986 a Hyundai-manufactured IBM PC-XT compatible called the Blue Chip PC was sold in discount and toy stores throughout the US. It was one of the earliest PC clones marketed toward consumers instead of business. In 1987, the government of South Korea urged Hyundai to recognize its workers' new unions. In 1988, Asian Sangsun was established, renamed Hyundai Logistics in 1992.

By the mid-1990s Hyundai comprised over 60 subsidiary companies and was active in a diverse range of activities including automobile manufacturing, construction, chemicals, electronics, financial services, heavy industry and shipbuilding. In the same period it had total annual revenues of around US$90 billion and over 200,000 employees. In December 1995, Hyundai announced a major management restructuring, affecting 404 executives.

During 1997 Asian financial crisis, Hyundai acquired Kia Motors and LG Semi-Conductor.

In 1998, Korea's economic crisis forced the group to begin restructuring efforts, which include selling off subsidiaries and focusing on five core business areas. Nevertheless, Hyundai began South Korean tourism to North Korea's Kumgangsan. In 1999, Hyundai Asan was established to operating Kumgang tourism, the Kaesong Industrial Complex, and other inter-Korean work. In April 1999 Hyundai announced an enormous corporate restructuring, involving a two-thirds reduction of the number of business units and a plan to break up the group into five independent business groups by 2003. In 2001, the founder Chung Ju-yung died, and the Hyundai Group conglomerate continued to be dismantled. Before his death, Chung decided for three of his sons as to how the group would be divided amongst them.

In 2007, Hyundai Construction Equipment India Pvt. Ltd. was established in India. In 2010, Hyundai Group was selected as a preferred bidder by creditors for the acquisition of Hyundai Engineering & Construction.

== Logo ==
1957-1974 logo

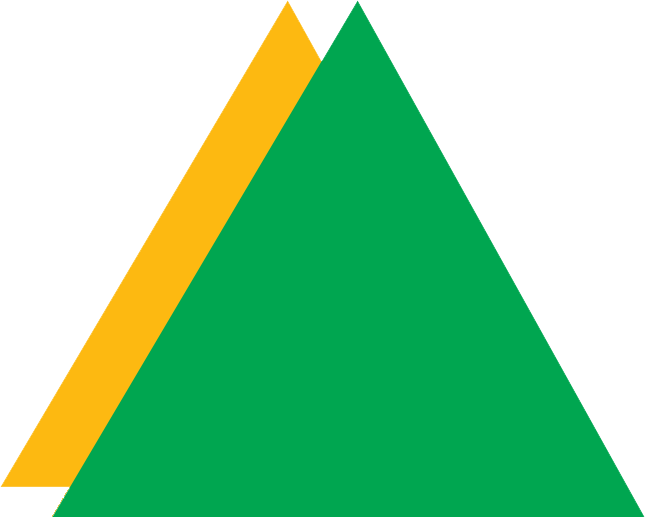
1974-1984 logo

The current logo in use since 1984

Korean variant, using hanja

== Affiliated companies ==
As of 2017, these are the affiliated companies of the Hyundai Group.

- Hyundai Power Equipment
- Hyundai Elevator
- Hyundai Movex
- Hyundai Asan
- Hyundai Research Institute
- Hyundai Investment Partners
- Hyundai Global
- Able Hyundai Hotel & Resort
- Bloomvista
- Hyundai Network
- Hyundai GBFMS

== See also ==
- Economy of South Korea
- Chaebol
- Hyundai Motor Company
- Hyundai and unions
