= Chung Kisun =

South Korean businessman (born 1982)

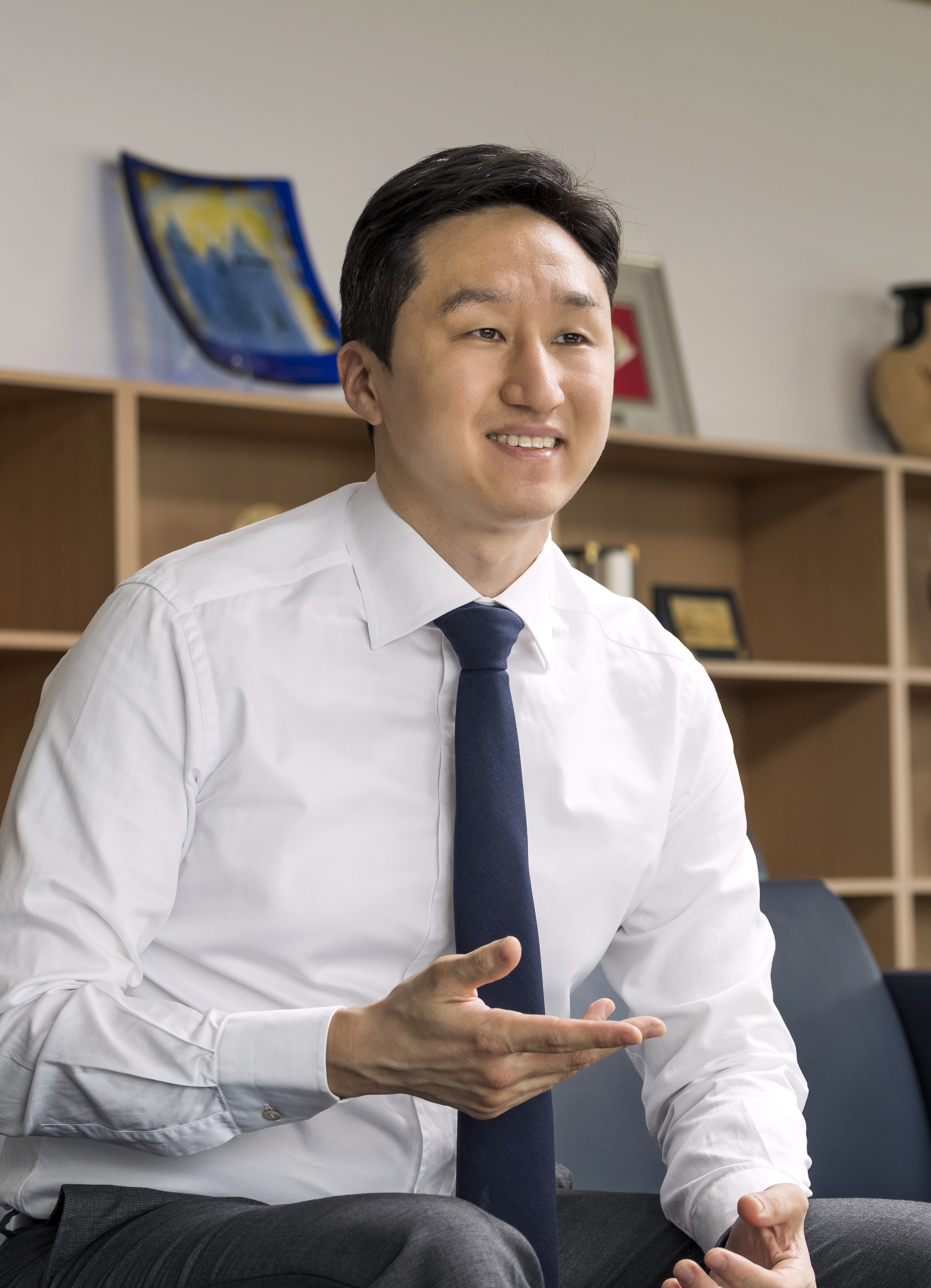
- Born: 3 May 1982 (age 44); South Korea
- Education: Stanford Graduate School of Business
- Occupations: Chairman, HD Hyundai

Chung Ki-sun (Korean: 정기선; born 3 May 1982), also spelled Kisun Chung, is a South Korean entrepreneur. He is the Chairman of HD Hyundai, a heavy industries conglomerate based in South Korea, and the eldest son of Chung Mong-joon, the honorary chairman of The Asan Institute for Policy Studies.

== Biography ==
Kisun joined HD Hyundai in 2008 and worked in several divisions, including Finance, Strategy, Sales & Marketing, and Research & Development, among others.

During the mid-2010s, he was involved in the company's response to the downturn in the shipbuilding industry. He also played a role in the acquisition of a construction equipment company and in the expansion of HD Hyundai's construction equipment business.

His work has included efforts in environmentally friendly marine propulsion systems, AI-assisted navigation technology, fuel cells, and vessel lifecycle services. He launched an autonomous navigation technology company, acquired European fuel cell companies, and took a maritime lifecycle service company public.

He delivered a keynote speech at the Consumer Electronics Show, the world's largest tech exhibition, in 2024, discussing HD Hyundai's business direction and technological advancements in the construction industry. Additionally, he has participated in international maritime industry projects in Saudi Arabia, the Philippines, and Vietnam. He is currently working on a project to help strengthen the U.S. shipbuilding industrial base as well. He has also attended the World Economic Forum's annual meeting in Davos every year since 2023.

Before joining HD Hyundai, Chung served as an officer leading a Special Operations Unit (Army Ranger) in the Republic of Korea Army. After being honorably discharged, he worked in journalism, management consulting, and investment banking. He earned an MBA from Stanford Graduate School of Business with distinction as an Arjay Miller Scholar.

== Career ==
- 2025.10~ Chairman and CEO of HD Hyundai, HD Korea Shipbuilding & Offshore Engineering, HD Hyundai XiteSolution
- 2024.11~2025.10 Executive Vice Chairman of HD Hyundai, HD Korea Shipbuilding & Offshore Engineering
- 2023.11~2024.10 Vice Chairman & CEO of HD Hyundai, HD Korea Shipbuilding & Offshore Engineering
- 2021~2023 President & CEO of HD Hyundai
- 2021 President & CEO, Hyundai Heavy Industries Holdings (Currently HD Hyundai)
- 2021~2023 President & CEO, HD Korea Shipbuilding & Offshore Engineering
- 2018 Representative Executive of Group Corporate Planning Office, Hyundai Heavy Industries Holdings
- 2018 Senior Executive Vice President, Managing Director, Hyundai Heavy Industries (Currently HD Hyundai Heavy Industries), Group Ship/Offshore Marketing
- 2017 CEO, Hyundai Global Service Co., Ltd. (Currently HD Hyundai Marine Solution)
- 2015 Senior Vice President, Hyundai Heavy Industries Co., Ltd., Head of Strategy and Financial Planning
- 2013 Vice President, Hyundai Heavy Industries Co., Ltd. (“HHI”), Head of Corporate Strategy
- 2011~2013 Consultant, Boston Consulting Group
- 2009 Assistant Officer, Hyundai Heavy Industries Co., Ltd
- 2007~2008 Staff Reporter, The Dong-A Ilbo
