= Sampyo =

Sampyo Group is a South Korean manufacturer of construction materials, established in 1966. Headquartered in Seoul, it has an annual turnover of $3.0 billion. Its products include ready-mix concrete, construction aggregate, and fly ash. In 1980, Sampyo Group extended its line of business to railway track and bridge construction by establishing Sampyo Engineering & Construction.

Sampyo Group also is involved in other line of industries such as mining, environmental services and logistics. Sampyo Group now has more than 20 subsidiary companies and plants in South Korea.

== Group companies ==
- Sampyo Corporation
- Sampyo Industry
- NRC
- Sampyo Precast Concrete & Construction
- Sampyo Railway
- Pentrack
- Sampyo Cement
- Sampyo Resources Development

== See also ==
- Economy of South Korea
