= Kil Yong-woo =

South Korean actor (born 1955)

- Born: December 17, 1955; South Korea
- Other name: Gil Yong-woo
- Education: Seoul Institute of the Arts – Performing Arts; Sangmyung University Graduate School of Arts – Master's degree
- Occupation: Actor
- Years active: 1975–present
- Agent: Hunus Creative

Korean name
- Hangul: 길용우
- Hanja: 吉用祐
- RR: Gil Yongu
- MR: Kil Yongu

Kil Yong-woo (Korean: 길용우; born December 17, 1955) is a South Korean actor.

In 2010, he played one of the main characters in the stage adaptation of the bestselling novel Please Look After Mom.

== Filmography ==
=== Film ===
Year	Title	Role
1981	An Embrace in the Dark Night	Kim Young-hoo
1983	A Forbidden Love	
1983	Making Love	
1983	The Sparrow and the Scarecrow	Yoon Sam-yuk
1984	Sweethearts	
1985	When Your Tears Run Dry	
1985	In the Heat of the Night	
1986	Dan	
1986	Red High Heels	Hyun Joon
1986	Eunuch	
1986	Love Song of a Hero	
1986	Back Car, Front Car	
1987	Lethe's Love Song	
1988	America, America	Dong-man
1989	Speeding Horse	
1992	I Will Forget You Now	Kim Chung-yong
1995	The Apocalypse of Love	
2007	Goodbye Day	
2008	Lovers of Six Years	Man in hair band (cameo)
2014	58, the Year of the Dog	Emperor Gojong

=== Television series ===
Year	Title	Role	Network
1981	1st Republic	Lee Kang-seok	MBC
1983	25th Hour of Ambition	Kim Soo-min	MBC
1983	500 Years of Joseon: Tree with Deep Roots	Jang Yeong-sil	MBC
1983	Kan-nan-yi		MBC
1984	500 Years of Joseon: The Ume Tree in the Midst of the Snow	King Seongjong	MBC
1985	Eulalia Grass	Lady Shin's husband	MBC
1986	Dew on a Blade of Grass	Ji Yong-tae	MBC
1987	Samogok (Song of Yearning)	Man-kang	KBS2
1987	Mother		KBS1
1988	Eun-hye's Land		KBS2
1989	500 Years of Joseon: Pamun	Jeong Yak-yong	MBC
1989	Moonlight Family	Kim Joon-tae	KBS2
1989	2nd Republic	Kim Young-sam	MBC
1990	Seoul Earthen Bowl	Kwang-ho	KBS1
1991	My Land	Jang Geon-sik	MBC
1992	Don't You Know This Person	North Korean sojwa Jang Il-gu	MBC
1992	The Three Kingdoms	King Uija	KBS1
1992	The Chemistry Is Right	Lee Jin-wook	SBS
1993	Fifteen in the Family	Deputy Park Chan-ki	SBS
1993	3rd Republic	Kim Young-sam	MBC
1993	How's Your Husband?	Do Joo-seob	SBS
1993	The Story of Bongi	Bongi Kim Seon-dal	KBS1
1993	Woman's Mirror	Jung Sang-woo	SBS
1994	The Lonely Man		KBS2
1994	Partner	Ji-pung	MBC
1994	Republic of Saravia	Kim Do-dal	KBS2
1995	Two Dads	Security company boss Kil Yong-woo	MBC
1995	Jang Hui-bin	Jang Hee-jae	SBS
1995	Korea Gate	Dr. Lee Kyung-seo	SBS
1996	Under Seoul's Sky	Lee Woong-ho	MBC
1997	The Third Man		MBC
1997	Fireworks	Director	MBC
1997	Jae-dong-yi	Jae-dong's father	SBS
1997	Promise		SBS
1998	Three Kim Generation	Kim Young-sam	SBS
1998	Eun-ah's Daughter	Kim Myung-soo	KBS1
1999	I'm Still Loving You	Bong Min-seob	MBC
2000	Look Back in Anger	Shin Sung-chul	KBS2
2000	Emperor Wang Gun	Bok Ji-gyeom	KBS1
2000	SWAT Police	Jang Dae-gyu	SBS
2000	The Golden Era	Yoo Hyun-seung	MBC
2000	Gibbs' Family		MBC
2001	Cool	Kang Joo-cheon	KBS2
2002	Sunlight Upon Me	Choi Tae-kyung	MBC
2002	The Story of Two Men		KBS2
2002	Man of the Sun, Lee Je-ma	Jwa-myeong	KBS2
2002	Age of Warriors	Imperial Ögedei Khan	KBS1
2002	Affection	Dr. Tak	SBS
2003	Land of Wine	Seo Tae-kwan	SBS
2004	The Age of Heroes	Im Dae-seok	MBC
2004	Emperor of the Sea	King Shinmu	KBS2
2006	Wolf	Company president Han Hong-man	MBC
2006	Dae Jo-yeong	King Bojang	KBS1
2007	Dal-ja's Spring	Kang Soon-hong	KBS2
2007	Thank You	Min Joon-ho	MBC
2007	Kimcheed Radish Cubes	Hwang Sang-beom	MBC
2008	Hong Gil-dong	Minister Hong Pan-seo	KBS2
2008	I Am Happy	Park Seung-jae	SBS
2009	Cinderella Man	Seo Yoo-jin's father (guest)	MBC
2009	Loving You a Thousand Times	Go In-duk	SBS
2009	Invincible Lee Pyung Kang	Woo Pyung-won	KBS2
2009	Cardinal Kim Sou-hwan on the Final Report	Stephen Kim Sou-hwan	PBC
2011	Twinkle Twinkle	Hwang Nam-bong	MBC
2011	Poseidon	Oh Yong-gap	KBS2
2011	If Tomorrow Comes	Yoon Won-seob	SBS
2011	Me Too, Flower!	Cha Bong-sun's father	MBC
2012	Rooftop Prince	Lord Hong Man-pil (guest)	SBS
2012	My Husband Got a Family	Bang Gwi-nam's adoptive father (guest)	KBS2
2013	Here Comes Mr. Oh	Charles Wang (Wang Chul-soo)	MBC
2013	Pots of Gold	Jung Byung-hoo	MBC
2013	A Tale of Two Sisters	Han Yong-deok	KBS1
2013	Heartless City	Attorney General Ji Man-hee	jTBC
2014	Can We Fall in Love, Again?	Kwon Ji-hyun's father	jTBC
2014	Mother's Garden	Seo Byung-jin	MBC
2014	Only Love	Choi Dong-joon	SBS
2015	My Unfortunate Boyfriend	Jung Hye-mi's father	MBC Dramanet
2015	A Daughter Just Like You	Ma Joong-ki	MBC
2016	Bubbly Lovely	Han Young-mok	SBS
2018	My Healing Love	Choi Jae-hug	MBC
2020	Fatal Promise	Han Kwang-hoon	KBS2
2020	Backstreet Rookie	Yoo Myung-Ki	SBS

=== Web series ===
Year	Title	Role	Ref.
2022	Welcome to Wedding Hell	Seo Jong-soo	

=== Variety/radio show ===
Year	Title	Notes
1991	FM Morning Show	DJ
1998–2010	효도우미 0700	Host

== Theater ==
Year	Title	Role
1975	Min-joong of Danwon	
2010	Please Look After Mom	Young-chul

== Other activities ==
Besides acting, Kil is also a full-time faculty member of Jangan University's Department of Entertainment, an adjunct professor at Kyungpook National University, and an adjunct professor at Kaya University.

== Ambassadorship ==
- Ambassador of Public Relations to Seoul (2023)

== Awards and nominations ==
Year	Award	Category	Nominated work	Result
1980	MBC Drama Awards	Best New Actor		Won
1980	MBC Drama Awards	Excellence Award, Actor		Won
1985	MBC Drama Awards	Top Excellence Award, Actor	Eulalia Grass	Won
1986	KBS Drama Awards	Popularity Award, Actor	Samogok	Won
1987	23rd Baeksang Arts Awards	Most Popular Actor (TV)	Samogok	Won
2008	16th Korean Culture and Entertainment Awards	모범연예인상		Won
2009	KBS Drama Awards	Best Couple Award with Choi Myung-gil	Invincible Lee Pyung Kang	Nominated
2011	MBC Drama Awards	Golden Acting Award, Actor in a Serial Drama	Twinkle Twinkle	Won
2012	3rd Korean Canonical Awards	Recipient, Culture and Arts Development category		Won
2023	Korea Drama Awards	Achievement Award	Kil Yong-woo	Won
