= List of ambassadors of Israel to Egypt =

Ambassador of Israel to Egypt
- שגריר ישראל במצרים
- Coat of Arms of Israel

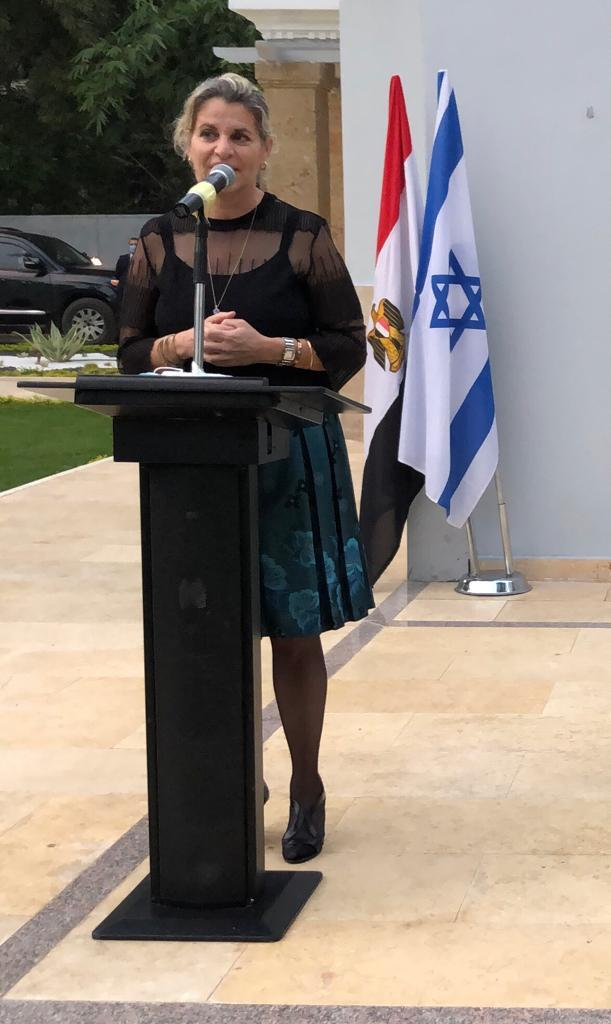
- Incumbent; Amira Oron since June 2020
- Nominator: Prime Minister of Israel
- Inaugural holder: Eliyahu Ben-Elissar
- Formation: 1980
- Website: Embassy

Diplomatic relations between Egypt and Israel were established on 26 February 1980, after the signing of the Egypt–Israel peace treaty on 26 March 1979. The first Israeli ambassador to Egypt was Eliyahu Ben-Elissar.

== List of ambassadors ==
Name	Duration of mission
Eliyahu Ben-Elissar	1980–1981
Moshe Sasson	1981–1988
Shimon Shamir	1988–1991
Efraim Dowek	1991–1992
David Sultan	1992–1996
Zvi Mazel	1997–2001
Gideon Ben-Ami	2001–2003
Eli Shaked	2004–2005
Shalom Cohen	2005–2009
Itzhak Levanon	November 2009 – December 2011
Yaakov Amitai	December 2011 – September 2014
Haim Koren	14 September 2014 – 2016
David Govrin	July 2016 – May 2019
Eyal Sela, charge d’affaires	May 2019 – June 2020
Amira Oron	June 2020 – present

== See also ==
- List of ambassadors of Egypt to Israel
