= Amira Oron =

Israeli diplomat

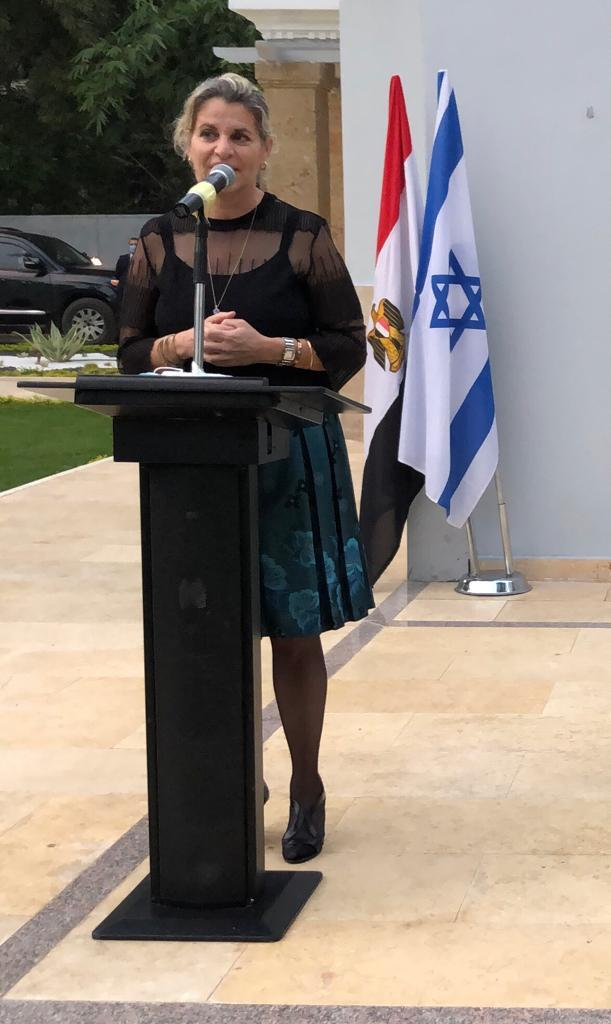

Amira Oron (Hebrew: אמירה אורון; born 1967) is an Israeli diplomat and ambassador to Egypt since June 2020. She is the country's first female ambassador to Egypt.

== Biography ==
Oron graduated from the Mae Boyar High School in 1984.

== Diplomatic career ==
At the time of her nomination as an ambassador to Egypt on October 29, 2018, Oron was the Foreign Ministry’s head of the Middle East Economic Relations Department. She is the second woman to serve as an Israeli ambassador in an Arab state. Einat Shlain was the first when she was Israel's top diplomatic representative in Jordan. Oron served as Ambassador to Turkey from 2014 to 2016, though after the Mavi Marmara flotilla raid, “Turkey lowered the status of Israel’s ambassador to that of an embassy official.” Oron was the first woman to head an embassy in Turkey. (Her title in Ankara has been given as Ambassador, head of the embassy and chargés d'affaires).

A year after her nomination, she was still in Israel. Oron was promoted for the post as an alternative to the candidate proposed by Prime Minister Benjamin Netanyahu, Ayoub Kara. Kara was considered a political appointment, and there were concerns about his “past several embarrassing diplomatic incidents.”

On June 7, 2020, the Israeli Cabinet approved Orion’s appointment as ambassador to Egypt. She replaced David Govrin in the position.

On September 23, 2020, Oron presented her credentials to Egyptian President Abdel Fattah el-Sisi, at a ceremony held at the Heliopolis Palace.

== See also ==
- Women of Israel
