= Itzhak Levanon =

Israeli diplomat (1944–2023)

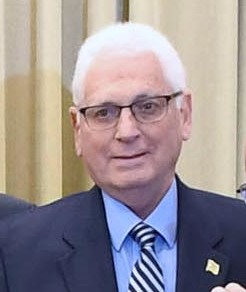
Levanon in 2017

Itzhak Levanon (Hebrew: יצחק לבנון; 5 November 1944 – 27 December 2023) was an Israeli diplomat who was Ambassador to Egypt from 2009 to 2011.

== Biography ==
Itzhak Levanon was born in Beirut to Yosef and Shulamit Kishik-Cohen. He attended Alliance Israélite Universelle, the International College at the American University of Beirut and College Beluga. He earned a degree in Middle Eastern studies and international relations from the Hebrew University in Jerusalem.

Levanon died on 27 December 2023, at the age of 79.

== Diplomatic career ==
Levanon began his public service career in 1969 as assistant for Arab affairs to Jerusalem mayor Teddy Kollek. In 1972, he joined the Israeli Ministry of Foreign Affairs, serving as a member of the Israeli mission to the United Nations in New York City. After the Madrid Conference, he was sent to Washington, D.C. as a member of the Israeli delegation to the peace talks. After several years in Venezuela and Colombia he spent five years in Paris, followed by five years in Canada and five years in Boston.

Levanon served as ambassador to the United Nations in Geneva and spokesperson of the Ministry of Foreign Affairs to the Arab world.

Levanon was appointed political counselor of the Embassy of Israel in France in 1982. In 1990 he was appointed consul general of Israel in Montreal. In 1994, he became the director of the North Africa and Lebanon Department of the Ministry of Foreign Affairs. In 1997, he was appointed consul general of Israel in New England.

== See also ==
- Egypt-Israel relations
- List of Israeli ambassadors to Egypt
