= Bassiouni =

Bassiouni is a surname. Notable people with the surname include:

- M. Cherif Bassiouni (1937–2017), Egyptian-born American scholar of law and human rights expert
- Mohammed Bassiouni (c. 1937–2011), Egyptian military officer and diplomat
