= Einat (given name) =

Einat (עֵינַת) is a Hebrew feminine given name. People with the names include:

- Einat Admony (born 1971), Israeli chef, restauranter, author and television personality
- Einat Amir (born 1979), Israeli interdisciplinary artist and researcher
- Einat Arif-Galanti (born 1975), Israeli visual artist
- Einat Glaser-Zarchin (born 1963), Israeli film director
- Einat Kalisch-Rotem (born 1970), Israeli mayor, Mayor of Haifa (2018–2024)
- Einat Ramon (born 1959), Israeli rabbi, first Israeli-born female to be a rabbi
- Einat Shlain, Israeli diplomat
- Einat Wilf (born 1970), Israeli public diplomat and politician
- Einat Yaron (born 1973), Israeli judoka
