= Foundfounded =

Foundfounded (stylized as found/Founded) is a South Korean industrial design company based in Seoul. The studio has carried out product, graphic, spatial, and user experience design projects for companies such as Samsung Electronics, Cheil Worldwide, and Hyundai Card.

It was founded in 2016 by designer Song Gyuho, who serves as its CEO together with Kim Joongu.

== Awards and recognition ==
Foundfounded's work has earned several international design awards. Its projects (for items such as a fire extinguisher and a urine test kit) have received the German iF Design Award, the German Red Dot Design Award, and the American International Design Excellence Award (IDEA).
