= Embassy of Egypt, Tel Aviv =

Diplomatic mission of Egypt to Israel

Embassy of the Arab Republic of Egypt in Tel Aviv
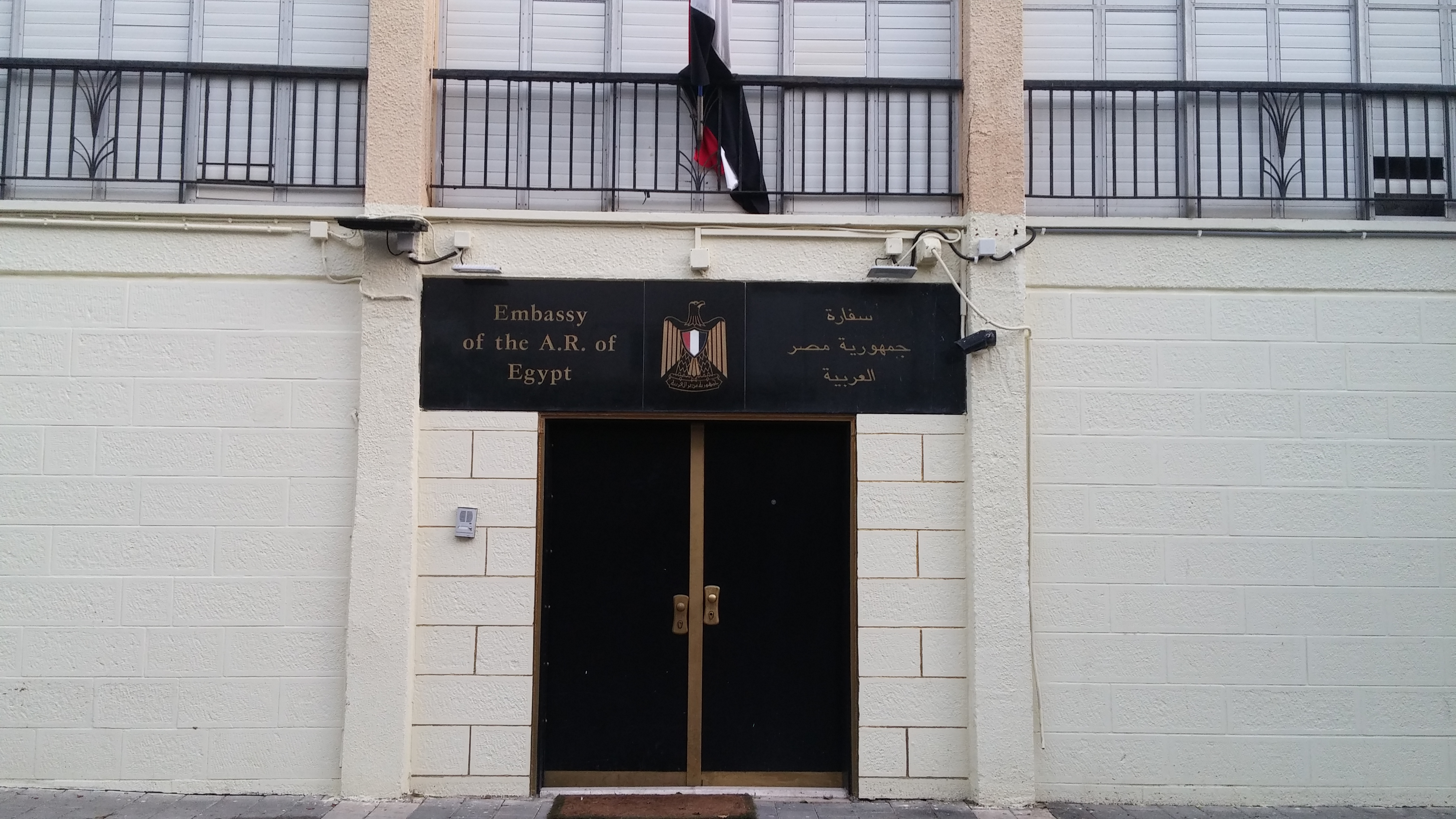
- Location: Tel Aviv
- Address: Basel Street 54
- Opened: 1980
- Chargé d'affaires: Magdi El Derini

The Embassy of Egypt in Tel Aviv (Arabic: سفارة جمهورية مصر العربية في تل أبيب; Hebrew: שגרירות הרפובליקה הערבית של מצרים בתל אביב) is the diplomatic mission of the Arab Republic of Egypt to the State of Israel. The chancery is located at Basel Street 54, in Tel Aviv.

The current head of mission is Magdi El Derini.

== History ==
Diplomatic relations between Egypt and Israel were established on 26 February 1980, after the signing of the Egypt–Israel peace treaty on 26 March 1979. The first Egyptian ambassador to Israel was Saad Mortada.

From 1982 to 1988, and from 2001 to 2005, there was no Egyptian ambassador to Israel.

== List of representatives ==
Below is a list of diplomatic representatives from Egypt to Israel.

#	Ambassador	Term	
#	Ambassador	Start	End
1	Saad Mortada	1980	1982
2	Mohammed Bassiouni	1986	2000
3	Mohamed Assem Ibrahim	March 17, 2005	September 15, 2008
4	Yasser Reda	September 17, 2008	August 31, 2012
5	Atef Salem	September 1, 2012	June 20, 2015
6	Hazem Khairat	June 21, 2015	April 28, 2018
7	Khaled Azmi	November 11, 2018	2024

== See also ==
- List of ambassadors of Israel to Egypt
