= Hyundai Card =

South Korean credit card company

- Industry: Financial services
- Founded: 2001
- Headquarters: Seoul, South Korea
- Key people: Ted Chung (Vice Chairman and CEO)
- Revenue: ▲ ₩2,526 billion (2020)
- Operating income: ▲ ₩328 billion (2020)
- Net income: ▲ ₩245 billion (2020)
- Total assets: ₩19,942 billion (2020)
- Parent: Hyundai Motor Group
- Website: hyundaicard.com

Hyundai Card (Korean: 현대카드; RR: Hyeondae Kadeu) is a credit card company under Hyundai Motor Group headquartered in Seoul, South Korea. In 2001, Hyundai Motor Group acquired Diners Club Korea, and relaunched it under the name Hyundai Card.

As of November 2022, the company has 10 million primary card members.

== History ==
In October 2001, Hyundai Motor Group acquired Diners Club Korea and changed its name to Hyundai Card Co., Ltd.

In 2003, they launched the Hyundai Card M which offered discounts of up to ₩500,000 (2006) (equivalent to ₩766,319.74 or US$571.76 in 2025) to members when purchasing a Hyundai or Kia vehicle. By 2009, the Hyundai Card M had more than 6 million members.

Hyundai Card released Korea's first premium credit card, "the Black", in 2005.

In July 2013, the company announced “Hyundai Card Chapter Two,” which allowed consumers to use their point mileage and cashback more freely if they met with a certain usage threshold.

In October 2015, the company launched the "Digital Hyundai Card" project which expanded online services for card members.

2015 saw the launch of Hyundai Card's first private label credit card (PLCC). They have since introduced partnerships with more than 11 brands including convenience store chain Emart, Hyundai Motor, eBay Korea, Costco, Korean Air, Starbucks, Naver and fashion commerce platform Musinsa. Their PLCC with eBay Korea acquired 420,000 customers within a year, gaining 700,000 users by January 2020.

As of the end of 2020, Hyundai Card had 8.9 million credit cardholders, and posted KRW 12.2 trillion in credit purchase volume. The company is spurring global expansion with its first overseas branch in Tokyo in August, 2020. As of April 2021, Hyundai Card has 9.15 million credit cardholders.

In March 2023, the company introduced Apple Pay for the first time in South Korea. The following month, Hyundai Card gained 335,000 new members, up 156% from the same period the previous year.

=== Investments ===
In 2005, General Electric Consumer Finance (also known as GE Capital) invested ₩678.3 billion (2005) (equivalent to ₩1.06 trillion or US$793.05 million in 2025) into the credit card company.

However, in 2017, they sold their 43% stake, equating to 69 million shares. Hyundai Commercial bought 30.5 million shares for ₩298 billion (US$222.34 million) making them the 2nd largest shareholder after Hyundai Motor (37%). The remainder was bought by Singaporean sovereign wealth fund GIC, and two private equity firms: Hong-Kong based Affinity Equity Partners & Amsterdam-based AlpInvest.

Then, in 2021, AlpInvest, Affinity Equity Partners and GIC all sold their stakes to Taiwan-based Fubon Financial, reportedly due to the sluggish progress of its initial public offering (IPO). In 2022, Fubon Financial increased their ownership of Hyundai Card to 19.98%.

=== Controversies ===
In August 2017, Hyundai Card held an Ariana Grande concert and was criticized for their handling of the US artist's performance. She arrived in Korea just 3 hours before the start of the concert, meaning there was no meet-and-greet or pre-show rehearsal which fans had paid up to ₩650,000 (US$484.97) to see. Grande was also the target of online ire due to her apparent indifferent attitude towards her Korean fans. The concert came just months after the Manchester Arena bombing, in which 22 fans died in a terrorist attack at one of her UK performances.

The Hyundai Card CEO released a statement criticising Grande, stating her actions left "much to be desired" and that "[Grande] arriving right before the concert and leaving immediately, avoiding the press has left the impression as if the concert itself was mechanical".

In 2023, the card company organized a Bruno Mars concert in Seoul and received backlash from concertgoers for supposedly giving preferential treatment to celebrities. It was speculated that celebrities, such as members of BTS and BLACKPINK, were given free front-row seats. An apology was issued by Hyundai Card Vice Chairman, promising to "pay closer attention to these matters".

== Products ==
The company also simplified its credit card portfolio by categorizing products into two in terms of the types of customer rewards ─ points and discounts. Its points-focused card series include M·M2·M3 BOOST, T3, and ZERO·ZERO MOBILE. Meanwhile, its discounts-focused products include X·X2·X3 BOOST, DIGITAL LOVER, and ZERO·ZERO MOBILE. In April 2021, Hyundai Card launched Z Series which consist of three types of cards – Z Family, Z Work and Z Ontact – depending on the areas the cards offer heavy discounts.

=== Premium Card ===
- 2005 - the Black
- 2006 - the Purple
- 2008 - the Red
- 2018 - the Green
- 2020 - the Pink

=== Point Card ===
M·M2·M3 BOOST, T3, ZERO·ZERO MOBILE Edition2 (points-focused)

=== Discount Card ===
X·X2·X3 BOOST, DIGITAL LOVER, ZERO·ZERO MOBILE Edition2 (discounts-focused)

=== Z Card ===
Z family, Z work, Z ontact

=== Private Label Credit Card (PLCC) ===
American Express Green/Gold/Platinum, MUSINSA Hyundai Card, Socar Hyundai Card, Baemin Hyundai Card, Starbucks Hyundai Card, Korean Air Hyundai Card, GS Caltex Hyundai Card, SSG.COM Hyundai Card, Emart eCard, Costco Reward Hyundai Card, Hyundai BLUEmembers Card, Kia Members Card, Genesis Hyundai Card, Smile Card (eBay)

== Corporate Culture ==
=== Company Slogan ===
- Strategy + Execution: There can be no execution without strategy and no strategy without execution.
- Speed: Speed is the only variable separating winners and losers in the final match.
- Never-ending Change: Existence requires continuous change.
- Diverse yet United: Top-level organizations are built upon diverse elements working together in tandem.

== Digital Transformation Hyundai Card ==
“Digital Hyundai Card” is a service provided through smartphone application offering customers with a more convenient and secure way to use a credit card.

=== Digital Hyundai Card Project ===
The 'Lock' service allows users to shut down their card function whenever they want, with a swipe on the credit card app. 'Limit', on the other hand, can be used to set credit limits for certain time periods. The 'Virtual Card Numbers' prevent card identity theft online by providing users with a set of numbers that can replace the customers’ actual credit card information online. The 'PayShot' makes online shopping easier by simplifying the payment process. Shoppers only need to log into one of seven different online shopping malls when using their Hyundai cards. 'Chameleon' allows the user to have multiple Hyundai cards on one card and select the card with benefits of his choice in Hyundai card application. 'Buddy' is an AI chatbot service that offers real-time counselling on inquiries about Hyundai card. 'OverseaTransfer' lets Hyundai card members wire money to the Hyundai card payment account without registering a bank account number by paying only KRW 3,000 of remittance fee per transaction.

=== Hyundai Card App 3.0 ===
Hyundai Card app 3.0, launched after its renewal, has been designed to maximize user convenience by offering information optimized for respective users. The app is equipped with a "Dual Home" structure, which divides the user's favorite menus into two categories. "Account Home" has adopted a highly legible interface, allowing users to browse their card spending data at a glance, whereas "Content Home" comes up with varied content deemed to be interesting for users after artificial intelligence analyzes their tastes and patterns.

=== Hyundai Card Spending Care by Personetics ===
Hyundai Card deployed an AI-based digital service jointly developed with Personetics, an Israeli fintech company. The developed feature added to the Hyundai Card smartphone app analyzes each customer's credit card transactions and offers near-real time personalized and proactive spending insights.

== Branding ==
=== Space Branding ===
Vinyl & Plastic by Hyundai Card, opened in June 2016, located in Itaewon in Seoul, Korea, boasts curated collections of over 20,000 vinyl LPs and CDs, covering a wide variety of musical genres. STORAGE by Hyundai Card, located in the same building as VINYL & PLASTIC by Hyundai Card, is an exhibition space showing a selection of contemporary pieces from a variety of disciplines, spanning art, film, architecture and design.

Hyundai Card Music Library & Understage, opened in May 2015, are located on the main street of Itaewon in Seoul. The library is where visitors can enjoy an analogue music culture while the Understage is a cultural space for musicians of all genres. The library features collections of more than 10,000 vinyl albums including around 400 rare albums since the 1950s and onward. There are also 4,000 music related publications. The Understage aims to host a wide range of performances.

Hyundai Card Travel Library, opened in May 2014, is filled with 15,000 books and maps of 92 different cities in Cheongdam-dong in Seoul, Korea. Designed by the interior designer Katayama Masamichi of Wonderwall with the concept of “stock of curiosity”, the Library not only features a book collection based on 13 themes but also contains elements that touches different perspectives of travel.

In February 2013, Hyundai Card Design Library, located in Gahoe-dong, central Seoul, displays 18,000 design-related books that have been published at home and abroad. About 70 percent of the books are rarely procured across the world, among which about 3,000 books are either out of print or had not been introduced here.

Hyundai Card CARD FACTORY is located on the ninth floor of the company's headquarters, and shows the whole automated process of card production from plate issuance to the reviewing and packing.

Hyundai Card Cooking Library is a space that captures knowledge, culture, and lifestyle allowing everyone to experience culinary charm.

Hyundai Card Art Library, which opened in August 2022, is located on the main street of Itaewon in Seoul. The library is a space containing books that are related to artists and works recognized for their historical value and the philosophy of Hyundai Card. The Complete Collection such as Parkett, every exhibition book of the Museum of Modern Art in New York, a catalog of all the main exhibitions of the Venice Biennale, and the Moving Image Room are displayed.

=== Culture Branding ===
Hyundai Card Culture Project have been held since 2011, ranging from musical concerts to exhibitions and others. Hyundai Card Super Concert has featured world-renowned superstars such as Queen, Elton John, Sting, R&B artists Usher and Beyonce, singer-songwriter Billy Joel and former The Beatles and pop artist Paul McCartney. Approximately 100,000 concertgoers witnessed the very first performance of the British rock band Coldplay in Korea over the span of two days.

== Corporate social responsibility ==
1913 Songjeong Station Market Project is the latest work of Hyundai Card's market renovation and revitalization project. The 103-year-old Songjeong Station Market, Gwangju, was given some trim and facelift resulting in a jump of daily visitors to 4,300 in May 2016 from 200 in May 2015.

Bongpyeong Market Project in 2014 conserved the basic infrastructure of the market and adopted exterior design in each shops under the slogan of “Development for Sustainability”, encouraging merchants to strive for change.

Dream Realization Project has helped mom and pop store owners to give a boost to their operation by adopting design factors. A total of 10 stores ranging from grocery, bistro, beauty shop, delicatessen and others have been provided with management consulting, interior redesigning and others to change their operations. The stores have since then seen a sales rise by an average of two-folds.

Hyundai Card Gapado Project is The Gapado Island situated off the southern coast of Jeju Island at one point in time experienced damage. Hyundai has with steadfast efforts turned Gapado Island into a success story and continues its transformation towards becoming a sustainable island where ecology, economy, and culture tranquilly co-exist.
