= Personetics Technologies =

Israeli fintech firm

- Company type: Private
- Industry: FinTech
- Founded: 2011
- Founders: David Sosna; David Govrin
- Headquarters: New York
- Area served: Worldwide
- Website: personetics.com

Personetics Technologies is a financial technology (fintech) software company headquartered in New York The company's product uses artificial intelligence to analyze bank's customer transaction data in real-time and use this analysis to deliver financial management information.

== History ==
Personetics was founded in 2011 by David Sosna and David Govrin. It offers services to big banks aiming to modernize their services, particularly in developing on-demand services. The company's AI-based engagement platform provides data-drive personalization, customer management, and money managements to these global financial institutions that are facing increasing competitions from neobanks, or online-only direct banks. It effectively operates through Consumer Data Right (CDR), an element in open banking that empowers consumers to get their banks share their personal data with fintechs.

In 2021, the company secured an $85-million funding, raising its valuation to more than $160 million.
