= Shulamit Kishik-Cohen =

Jewish spy for Israel in Lebanon

- שולמית קישיק-כהן
- Born: 1917; Buenos Aires, Argentina
- Died: 21 May 2017 (aged 100); Jerusalem
- Occupation: Spy
- Spouse: Yosef

Shulamit "Shula" Kishik-Cohen (Hebrew: שולמית (שולה) קישיק-כהן, Arabic: شولاميت (شولا) كوهين كشك, also Shulamit Cohen-Kishik; 1917 – 21 May 2017) was an Israeli spy who worked to smuggle Jews from Arab countries into Israel. She was noted for her missions in Lebanon and work for the Mossad.

== Biography ==
Shulamit Erazi-Cohen was born in Argentina, immigrated to Mandatory Palestine as a child, and grew up in the Mekor Baruch neighborhood in Jerusalem. She studied at the Evelina de Rothschild School. At the age of 16, she married a Lebanese-Jewish merchant named Yosef Kishik-Cohen. The couple lived in Wadi Abu Jamil, the Jewish quarter in Beirut and raised seven children. Her son, Itzhak Levanon, was an Israeli diplomat who served as Israel's ambassador to Egypt.

In Beirut, she began working in the local Jewish community and even established contacts with the authorities. Throughout Lebanon, Jews were smuggled to Israel under the noses of the Lebanese authorities. At the beginning of the 1948 Arab–Israeli War, she transferred information about Lebanese military activity to the headquarters of the Haganah in Metulla. She continued her espionage activities without the knowledge of her family, sending her two older children to Israel for their own safety.

Kishik-Cohen continued to gather intelligence from Lebanon and Syria from 1947 to 1961. She assisted the Mossad in bringing the Jews of Lebanon and other Arab countries to Israel. Her Mossad codename was "The Pearl." She was caught in 1952 and imprisoned for 36 days. In 1961, Kishik-Cohen was arrested by the Lebanese authorities. After being severely tortured her trial started in November 1962. At first announcing a death sentence the court changed it to 20 years. In August 1963 following her appeal it was reduced to seven years. Her husband was also arrested and accused of knowing about his wife's activities. In August 1967 she was released as part of the prisoner exchange deal following the Six-Day War and resided in Jerusalem until her death in 2017.

In 2007, on the 59th Independence Day of the State of Israel, Kishik-Cohen was selected to light a torch at the annual torchlighting ceremony. In 2010 she was awarded the title of Yakir Yerushalayim. In November 2011, she won the Dona Gracia Medal.

Shulamit Kishik-Cohen died on 21 May 2017 at the age of 100, at Hadassah Medical Center in Jerusalem, at the Mount Scopus campus.

== See also ==
- Unit 504
- Aliyah bet
- Israel defense forces
- Jewish exudes from the Muslim world
