= Haim Koren =

Israeli diplomat (born 1953)

- חיים קורן
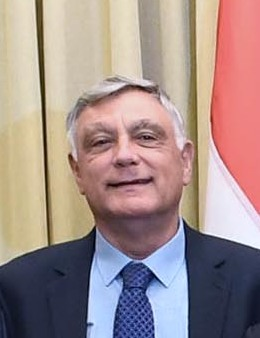

Israeli Ambassador to Egypt
- In office May 2014 – August 2016
- Preceded by: Yaakov Amitai
- Succeeded by: David Govrin

Personal details
- Born: 6 June 1953 (age 73) Israel
- Occupation: Ambassador

Haim Koren (Hebrew: חיים קורן; born 6 June 1953) is an Israeli diplomat. He is a former director of Israel's Foreign Ministry Political Planning Division and the former Israeli ambassador to Egypt and South Sudan.

== Diplomatic career ==
Haim Koren served in various diplomatic capacities in the United States, Egypt, and Nepal. He was the Director of the Israel's Middle East Division of Foreign Affairs.

He is fluent in the Arabic language including the Sudanese dialects. During his diplomatic career, he has worked with security officials in dealing with and understanding Sudanese refugees from Darfur.

Koren is Director Middle East Division, Center of Political Research Ministry of Foreign Affairs, Jerusalem. His many positions at the Ministry of Foreign Affairs, included serving as Director, Political Planning Division, Jerusalem, Deputy Spokesman, Press Division, Consul for Press and Information. Consulate General of Israel, Chicago. Consul, Consulate General of Israel, Alexandria, Egypt. Second Secretary, Embassy of Israel, Kathmandu, Nepal.

== Academic career ==
Koren wrote his Ph.D. on the "Local Archives in Dar Fur (Western Sudan) 1720 – 1916." Koren taught courses on the development of the Arab world and the social and political development of Arabs in Israel at University of Haifa.

He was also a lecturer in Middle Eastern History, the sociology of Islam and the Arab media at Emek Yezreel College.
