= Mohammed Bassiouni =

Egyptian ambassador to Israel from 1986 until 2000

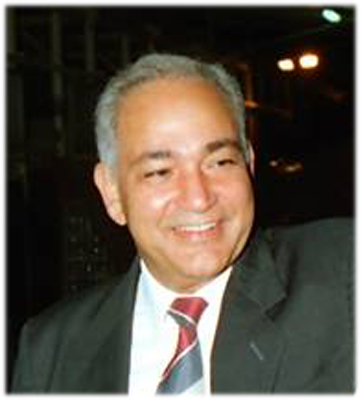
Mohammed Bassiouni

Mohammed Bassiouni (c. 1937 – September 18, 2011) was an Egyptian military officer and diplomat. He served as the Egyptian ambassador to Israel from 1986 until 2000.

== Diplomatic career ==
In 1982, Bassiouni was posted to the Egyptian embassy, located in Tel Aviv, following the conclusion of the Camp David Peace Accord in 1979, which established diplomatic relations between Egypt and Israel. Bassiouni was appointed ambassador in 1986. He held the ambassadorship until 2000, when he was recalled during the Second Intifada. While in Israel, Bassiouni was a regular guest at social events and maintained these social connections for the rest of his life.

Bassiouni was appointed as the Shura Council's foreign relations committee deputy leader after returning to Egypt and became a member of parliament's upper house.

He died in Cairo, Egypt, on September 18, 2011, at the age of 74.
