= Egypt–Israel relations =

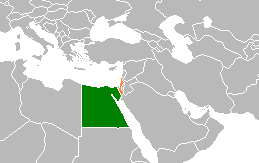
- Egypt: Israel

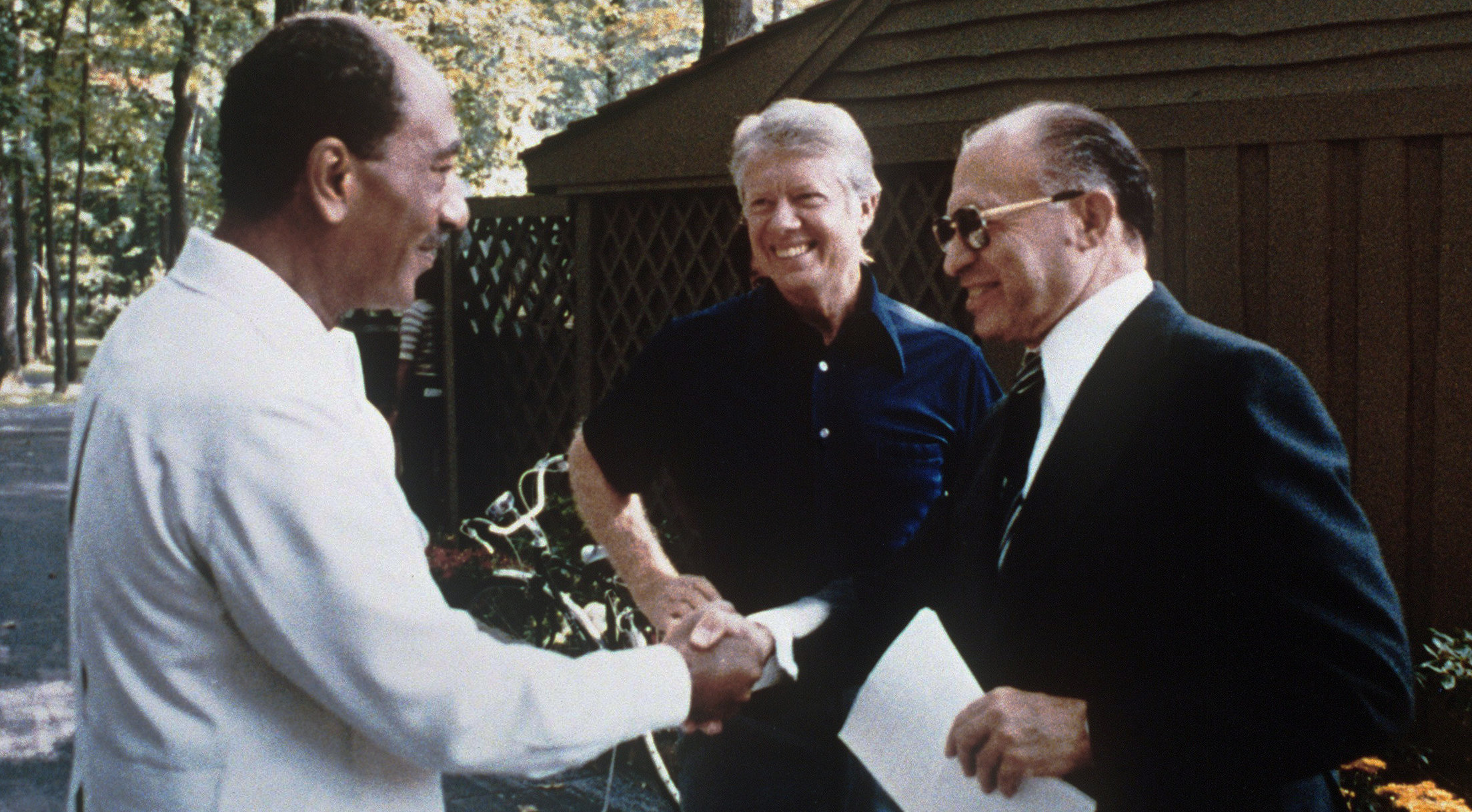
Anwar Sadat, Jimmy Carter and Menachem Begin at Camp David, 1978

Foreign relations between Egypt and Israel, which dated back to the 1948 Arab–Israeli War culminated in the Yom Kippur War in 1973, and was followed by the 1979 Egypt–Israel peace treaty a year after the Camp David Accords, mediated by U.S. president Jimmy Carter. Full diplomatic relations were established on January 26, 1980, and the formal exchange of ambassadors took place one month later, on February 26, 1980, with Eliyahu Ben-Elissar serving as the first Israeli Ambassador to Egypt, and Saad Mortada as the first Egyptian Ambassador to Israel. Egypt has an embassy in Tel Aviv and a consulate in Eilat. Israel has an embassy in Cairo and a consulate in Alexandria. Their shared border has two official crossings, one at Taba and one at Nitzana. The crossing at Nitzana is for commercial and tourist traffic only. The two countries' borders also meet at the shoreline of the Gulf of Aqaba in the Red Sea.

Peace between Egypt and Israel has lasted for more than forty years and Egypt has become an important strategic partner of Israel. In January 2011, Binyamin Ben-Eliezer, a former defense minister known for his close ties to Egyptian officials, stated that "Egypt is not only our closest friend in the region, the co-operation between us goes beyond the strategic." Nevertheless, the relationship is sometimes described as a "cold peace", with many in Egypt skeptical about its effectiveness. According to a 2019–2020 survey, 13% of Egyptians support diplomatic recognition of Israel while 85% oppose. The Arab–Israeli conflict kept relations strained and anti-Israeli sentiment is prevalent in the Egyptian media.

== History ==
=== Conflicts of the early years ===
==== Background ====
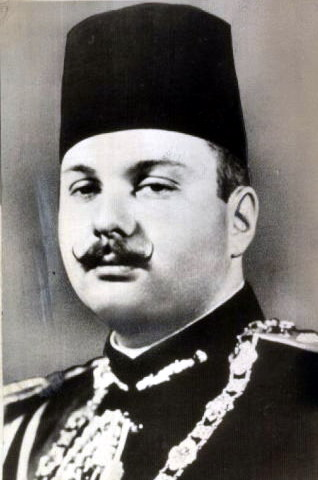
King Farouk I

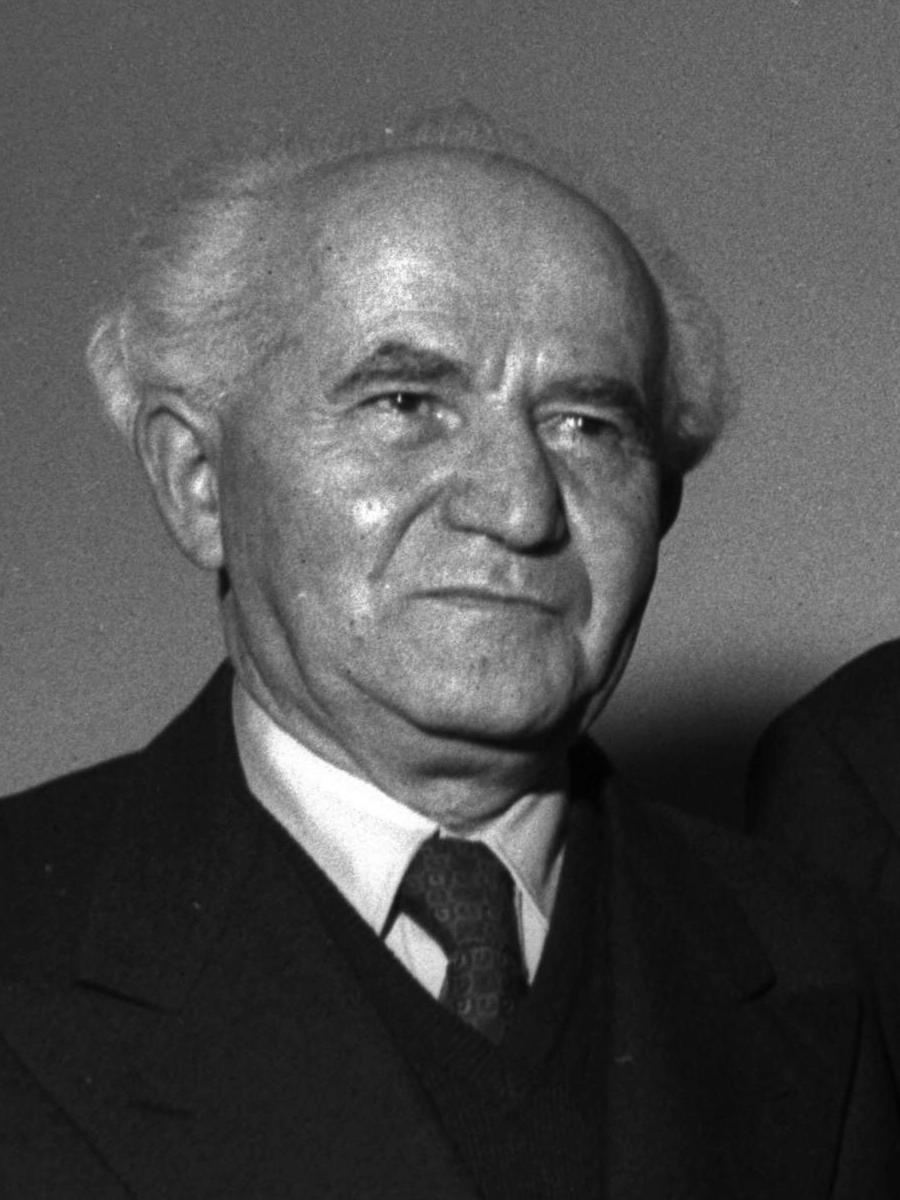
David Ben-Gurion

In 1947, Egypt was a constitutional monarchy, with King Farouk I holding substantial power. Although Egypt had been formally neutral for most of World War II, Britain had used Egypt as a base for Allied operations throughout the region. After the war, hostility in Egypt towards the continued British presence grew increasingly pronounced. Britain had governed Palestine under a League of Nations mandate for several decades and had also supported the establishment of a Jewish state there. In 1947, the British government referred the matter to the United Nations, which adopted the Partition Plan (Resolution 181). The plan proposed dividing Palestine and ultimately led to the creation of Israel. In the debate over this resolution, the Egyptian government voiced strong concern about Jewish settlement activity near its border, viewing it as the beginning of broader ambitions toward Sinai—an intention it claimed was reflected in various public statements. Egypt voted against the resolution but was outvoted. On 14 May 1948, under the leadership of David Ben-Gurion, the State of Israel was established as a parliamentary democracy.

==== First Arab-Israel war ====
Immediately after Israel declared its independence in May 1948, both superpower leaders, U.S. president Harry S. Truman and Soviet leader Joseph Stalin, recognized the new state. The Arab League members Egypt, Transjordan, Syria, Lebanon and Iraq refused to accept the UN partition plan and proclaimed the right of self-determination for the Arabs across the whole of Palestine. The Arab states invaded the newly declared State of Israel, which had until the previous day been part of Mandatory Palestine, starting the first Arab–Israeli War. The 10 months of fighting took place mostly in Israel, in the Sinai Peninsula and southern Lebanon, interrupted by several truce periods.

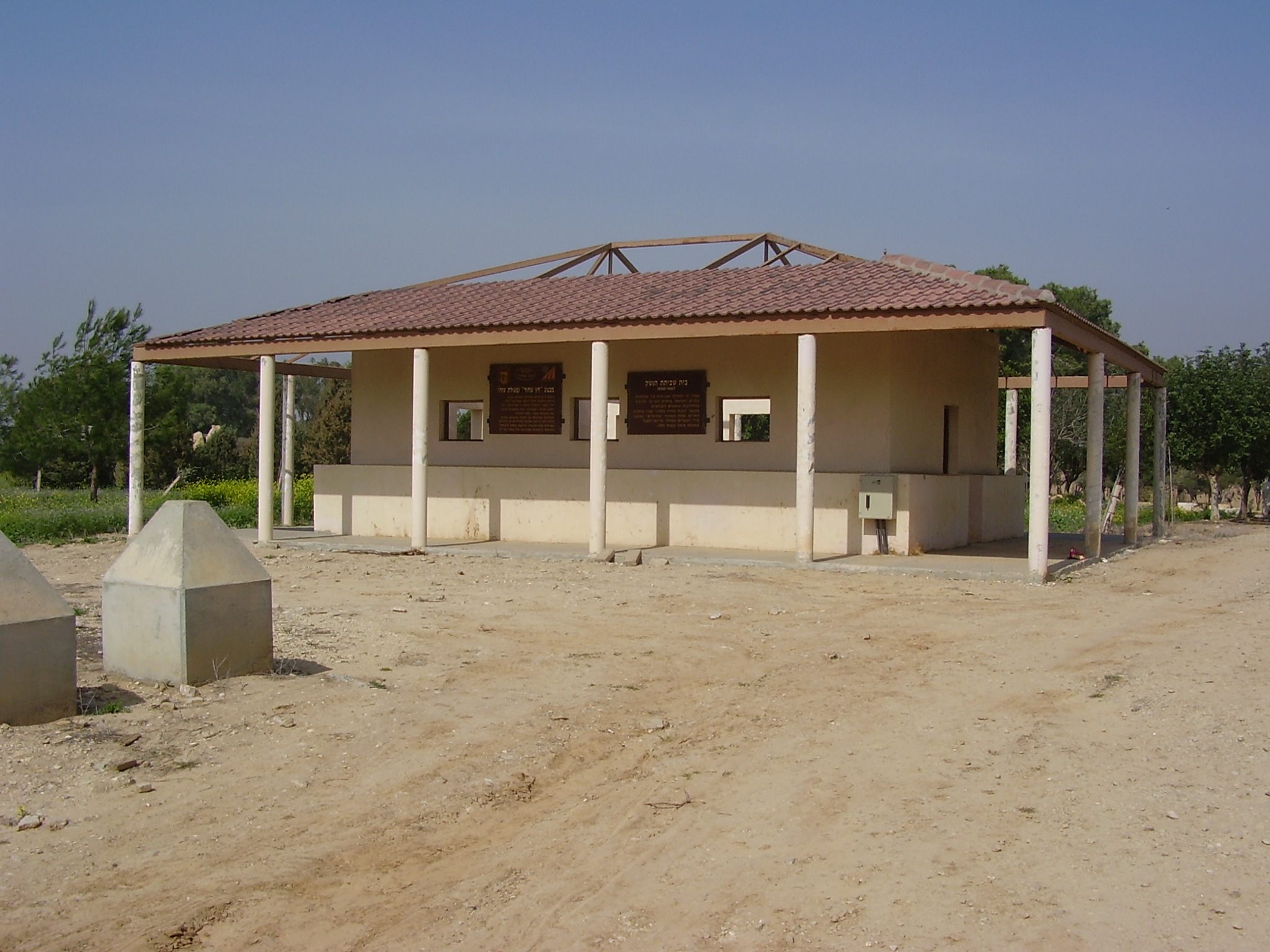
Israel–Egypt Armistice Commission building

The war between Israel and Egypt ended with the signing of an armistice agreement on 24 February 1949. In the accord with Egypt, armistice lines were established that served as de facto borders. As a result of the war, Israel expanded its territory beyond the areas allocated to it under the 1947 UN partition plan. Egypt assumed control of the Gaza Strip, while Transjordan (later Jordan) took over the West Bank. Egypt still did not recognize Israel as a sovereign state. These armistice lines remained in place until the outbreak of war in 1967. However, no peace was reached until 1979, and the two countries remained enemies until that time.

At the start of the Arab–Israeli war, Egypt blocked Israeli shipping through the Suez Canal, severely restricting Israel’s access to maritime trade routes to Asia and East Africa. Although Israel captured the site of Eilat in March 1949, gaining access to the Gulf of Aqaba, Egypt began militarizing the nearby islands of Tiran and Sanafir by the end of that year, asserting control in coordination with Saudi Arabia. Israel first complained to the UN about Egypt’s interference with Suez Canal shipping in June 1951 and, while the Straits of Tiran were not yet in regular use, it prepared military options in case diplomacy failed. UN Security Council Resolution 95, adopted on 1 September 1951, called on Egypt to end restrictions on commercial shipping through the Suez Canal, though Egypt ignored the resolution.

==== Egyptian revolution of 1952 ====
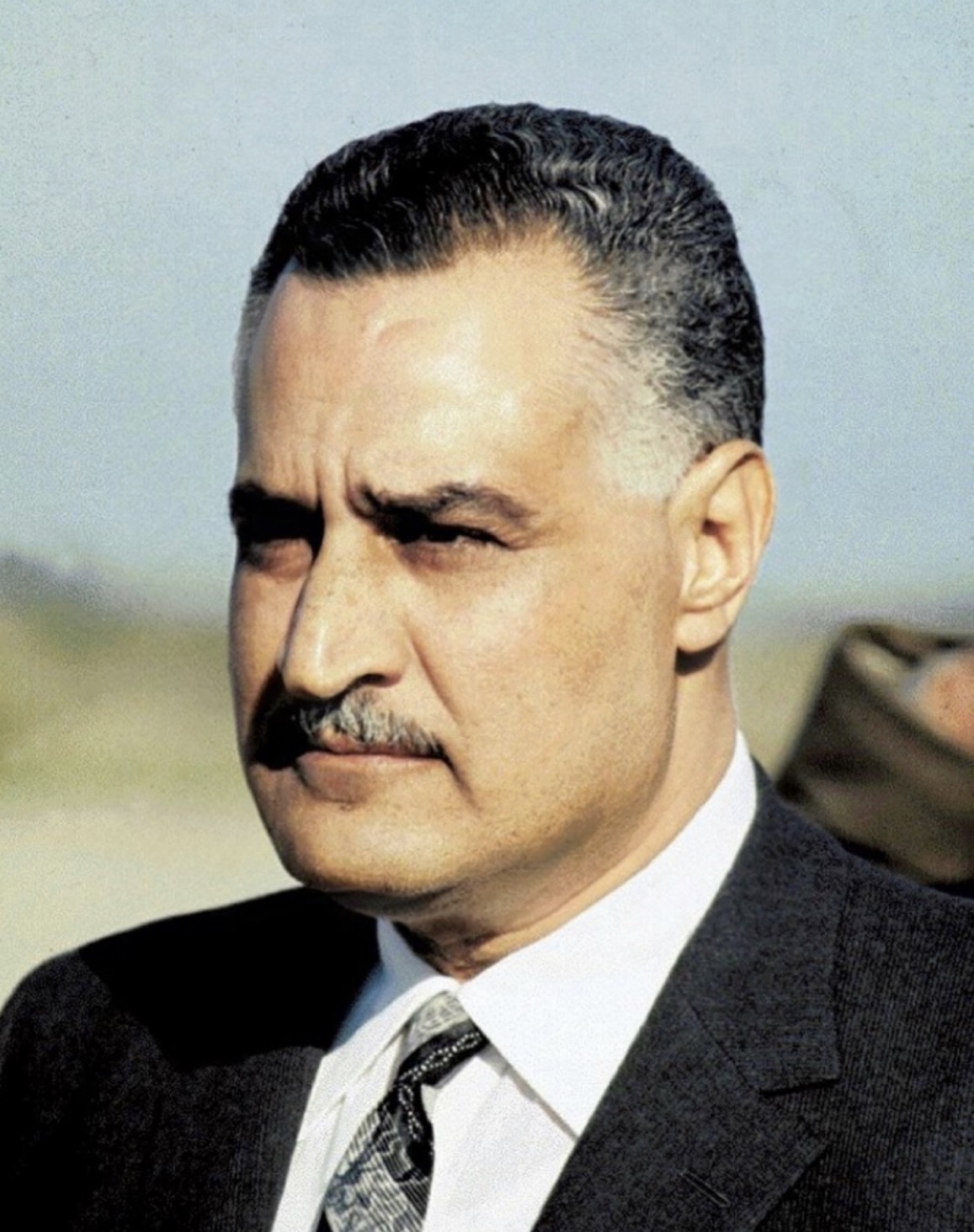
Gamal Abdel Nasser

Following the Egyptian Revolution of 1952, led by the Free Officers Movement, Egypt abolished the monarchy and declared a republic in 1953 under President Muhammad Naguib. Power soon shifted to Gamal Abdel Nasser, who took office in 1956 and established a nationalist, anti-imperialist regime grounded in Arab socialism and non-alignment. Under Nasser, Egypt centralized political control, suppressed opposition groups like the Muslim Brotherhood, and introduced major reforms, including expanded suffrage and a new constitution. Nasser aimed to lead a pan-Arab movement, a political ideology advocating for the unification of all Arab countries.

==== Lavon affair ====
In 1954, Israeli military intelligence orchestrated a failed covert operation in Egypt known as the Lavon affair. A group of Egyptian Jews were recruited to carry out bombings at American, British, and Egyptian civilian sites in an attempt to damage Egypt’s international standing and encourage continued British military presence in the Suez Canal zone. The attacks were to be blamed on the Muslim Brotherhood, amongst others. It was apparently hoped that the ensuing chaos would convince Western governments that Nasser’s regime was unstable and thus undeserving of financial or other support. The plan was exposed, leading to arrests, trials, and the execution or imprisonment of several operatives. The scandal forced Israeli defense minister Pinhas Lavon to resign and strained Egypt–Israel relations. In February 1955, outrage in Israel over the execution of two operatives involved in the Lavon affair led to widespread calls for retaliation. On 28 February, the Israeli military launched a raid on Gaza—then under Egyptian control—that resulted in the deaths of 39 Egyptians. Israel denied involvement until 2005, when the surviving operatives were officially honored.

==== Cross-border violence ====
Prior to 1955, Nasser had pursued efforts to reach peace with Israel and had worked to prevent cross-border Palestinian attacks. In February 1955, Unit 101, an Israeli unit under Ariel Sharon, conducted a raid on the Egyptian Army headquarters in Gaza in retaliation for a Palestinian fedayeen attack that killed an Israeli civilian. As a result of the incident, Nasser began allowing raids into Israel by the Palestinian militants. Egypt established fedayeen bases not just in Gaza but also in Jordan and Lebanon, from which incursions could be launched with a greater amount of plausible deniability on the part of Nasser's Egypt. The raids triggered a series of Israeli reprisal operations, which ultimately contributed to the Suez Crisis.

==== Suez crisis ====
The Suez Crisis was a British–French–Israeli invasion of Egypt in 1956. Prior to the invasion, Egypt had tightened a blockade that had already restricted Israeli shipping for eight years. In response, Israel invaded Egypt on 29 October 1956, aiming primarily to re-open the Straits of Tiran and regain access to the Gulf of Aqaba. After issuing a joint ultimatum for a ceasefire, the United Kingdom and France joined the Israelis on 5 November, intending to remove Egyptian president Gamal Abdel Nasser from power and regain control of the Suez Canal, which Nasser had earlier nationalised by transferring it from the foreign-owned Suez Canal Company to Egypt's new government-owned Suez Canal Authority.

However, the invasion provoked strong opposition from the United States, the Soviet Union, and the United Nations, forcing all three invading countries to withdraw. Although Israel withdrew after four months, its temporary occupation of the Gaza Strip and the Sinai Peninsula enabled it to achieve its goal of regaining access to the Straits of Tiran. Following the withdrawal, Sinai was returned to Egypt, and Egypt resumed control of Gaza. The Suez Canal, however, remained closed from October 1956 to March 1957. As a result of the conflict, the UN established an emergency force to police and patrol the Egypt–Israel border.

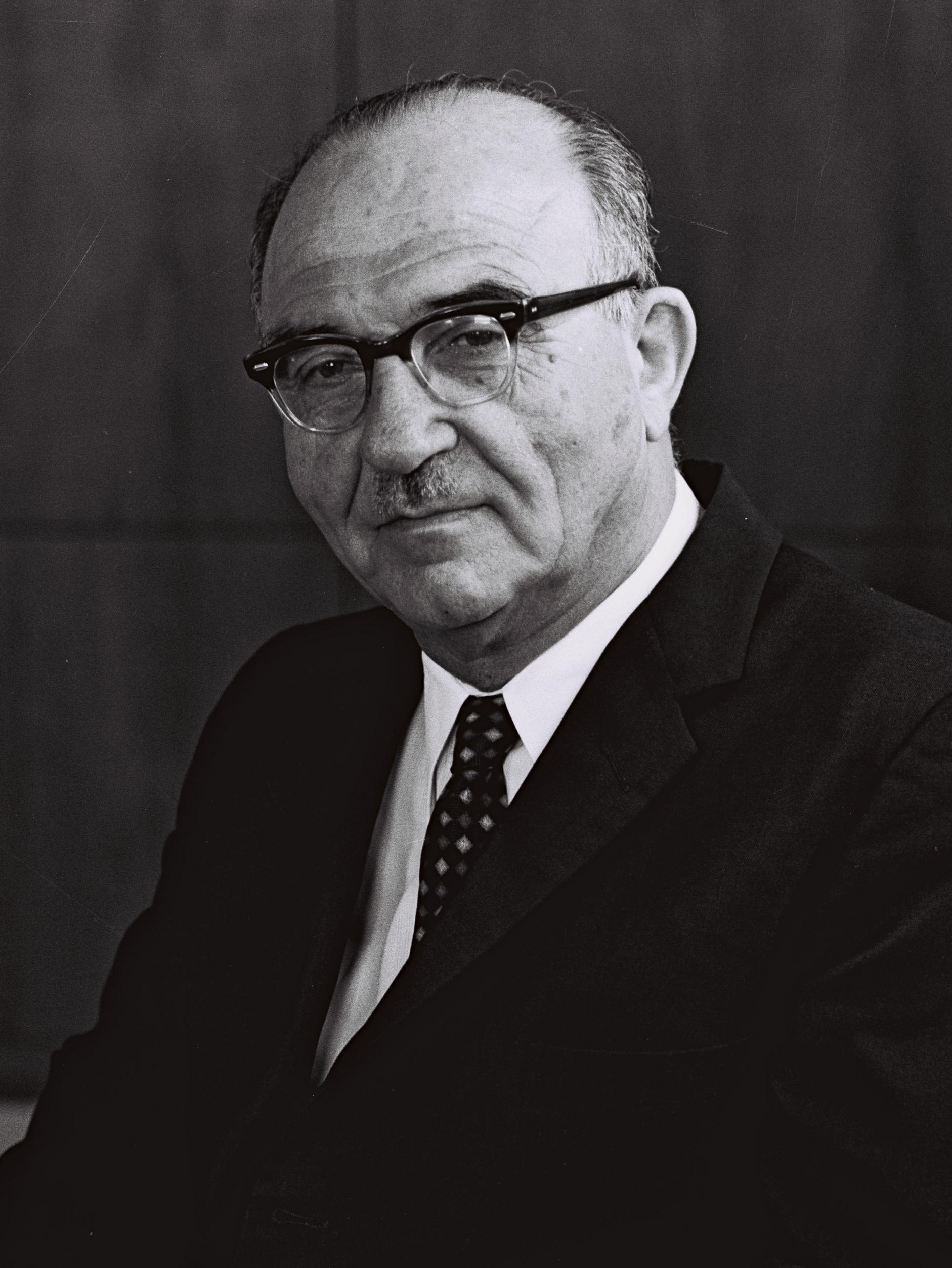
Levi Eshkol

Ben-Gurion resigned as prime minister on 16 June 1963. Levi Eshkol succeeded him as prime minister, minister of defense, and leader of the ruling Mapai party. David Ben-Gurion was seen as a decisive and authoritative leader, capable of bold action during times of crisis. In contrast, Levi Eshkol projected a more moderate image. He preferred broad consultation and often hesitated before making decisions, reflecting a more cautious leadership style. Moshe Dayan became defense minister in 1967, four days before the start of the Six-Day War.

In the years leading up to the 1967 war, Mossad director Meir Amit was in secret contact with Egypt officials. According to Amit's memoirs, in 1965, clandestine negotiations were held where Egypt would commit to the 1955 Johnston’s plan and prevent violence in exchange for Israeli assistance in acquiring loans from European countries for Egypt. However, Egyptian officials demanded that further negotiations be held in Cairo and not Europe, but prime Minister Eshkol insisted that negotiations stay in Europe for safety. Negotiations ended when the Israeli negotiators suggested that Egypt release some convicted members of Operation Susannah. In the build-up to the war, Amit believed that war could have prevented had he been allowed to fly to Cairo, but Eshkol and Isser Harel disagreed.

=== More wars and peace treaty ===
==== Six-Day War ====
The Six-Day War, fought from 5 to 10 June 1967, marked a turning point in Egypt–Israel relations. Following rising tensions and Egyptian troop movements along the Israeli border in Sinai, Israel carried out preemptive strikes, swiftly defeating Egyptian forces and occupying both the Sinai Peninsula and the Gaza Strip. The war dealt a heavy blow to Egypt and significantly expanded Israeli-controlled territory, deepening the conflict between the two states. While the war began with a confrontation between Israel and Egypt, it quickly expanded to include Jordan and Syria, with Israel capturing the West Bank and East Jerusalem from Jordan and the Golan Heights from Syria.

Following this war, no serious diplomatic efforts were made to resolve the issues at the heart of the Arab–Israeli conflict. Israel had more than doubled its size since the start of the war, and it was willing to return the occupied territories in exchange for Arab recognition of its sovereignty and assurances of non-aggression. But at the Arab League summit in September 1967, member states adopted the "three no's" policy: no peace with Israel, no recognition of Israel, and no negotiations with Israel. Egyptian president Nasser believed that only military initiative would compel Israel to agree to a full Israeli withdrawal from Sinai, and hostilities soon resumed along the Suez Canal.

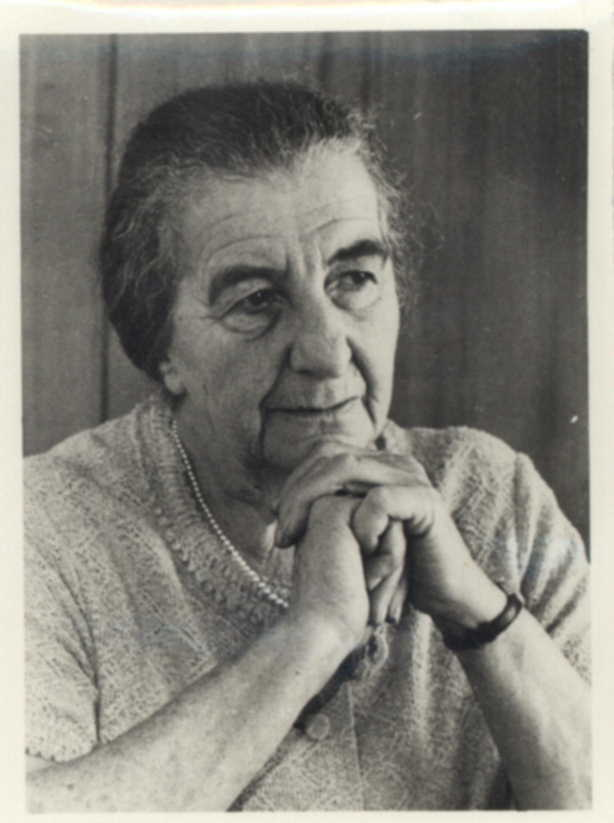
Golda Meir

In early 1969, Levi Eshkol died. A few weeks later, he was succeeded by Golda Meir. She became party leader and she won the elections in the fall of that year.

==== War of Attrition ====
The War of Attrition, fought between Egypt and Israel from 1967 to 1970, was a prolonged and intense conflict over control of the Sinai, which Israel had captured during the 1967 Six-Day War. Egyptian president Nasser sought to weaken Israel militarily and economically through sustained pressure, aiming to force a withdrawal from Sinai. Egypt began by shelling Israeli positions near the Suez Canal, followed by the sinking of an Israeli destroyer later that year and renewed artillery attacks in 1968. In late 1969, Israeli airstrikes on Egyptian towns near the Suez Canal led to high civilian casualties and contributed to the flight of 700,000 Egyptian internal refugees. This pushed Nasser to seek support from both the United States and the Soviet Union. After U.S. mediation led to a ceasefire agreement on 7 August 1970, Egypt violated its terms by installing new missile sites near the canal, prompting Israel to withdraw from peace talks. The war ended without territorial changes or a lasting resolution.

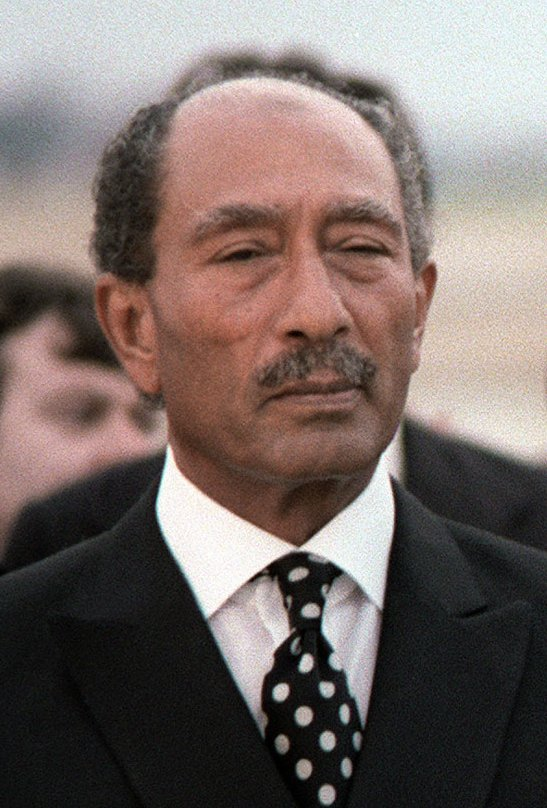
Anwar Sadat

Egyptian president Nasser died in 1970, and his vice president Anwar el-Sadat was elected to succeed him as president. He was one of the original members of the Free Officers Movement.

==== Yom Kippur war/October war ====
Several months before the Yom Kippur War/October War, then-Israeli Prime Minister Golda Meir offered to return most of the Sinai Peninsula to Egypt in exchange for peace. The proposal, conveyed to Egyptian Presidential Adviser Hafez Ismail in June 1973, included a partial Israeli withdrawal but not a full return to the 1967 borders. Egypt firmly rejected the offer, insisting on complete withdrawal and refusing to enter preliminary talks.

The Yom Kippur War, fought from 6 to 25 October 1973, began when Egypt and Syria launched coordinated surprise attacks on Israeli positions in the Sinai Peninsula and Golan Heights, both occupied by Israel since 1967. Egypt initially made significant gains in Sinai, taking advantage of Israel’s reduced readiness during the Yom Kippur holiday. Israel suffered severe losses. However, Israel soon regrouped and counterattacked, crossing the Suez Canal and encircling the Egyptian Third Army. While the war ended in a military stalemate, Egypt’s early successes helped restore Arab morale after the 1967 defeat, and the conflict prompted Israel to reassess its military and intelligence doctrines.

==== Sinai disengagement agreements ====
In a significant departure from Nasser’s confrontational stance, president Anwar Sadat shifted Egypt’s policy toward pursuing peace with Israel through negotiation and diplomacy. His motivation was primarily to regain the Sinai Peninsula and to strengthen Egypt’s economic and military position by building closer ties with the United States. Sadat first spoke about the possibility of peace with Israel in February 1971; Egypt was the initiator of many moves in the 1970s. For Israel, reaching a peace agreement with Egypt, its principal Arab adversary, was highly significant, as it secured the southern front and effectively removed the option of conventional war for other Arab states.

As a result, Israel and Egypt signed two Sinai Disengagement Agreements. The first, in January 1974, established a UN-monitored buffer zone on the east bank of the Suez Canal and positioned limited Egyptian and Israeli forces on either side. Egypt also accepted most of the assurances requested by Israel. Negotiations for the second agreement, signed in September 1975, were more difficult. It led to a further Israeli withdrawal eastward in Sinai and the establishment of an expanded UN buffer zone. The agreement also included a major U.S. commitment, involving the deployment of three manned stations and three unmanned electronic sensor fields in the region.

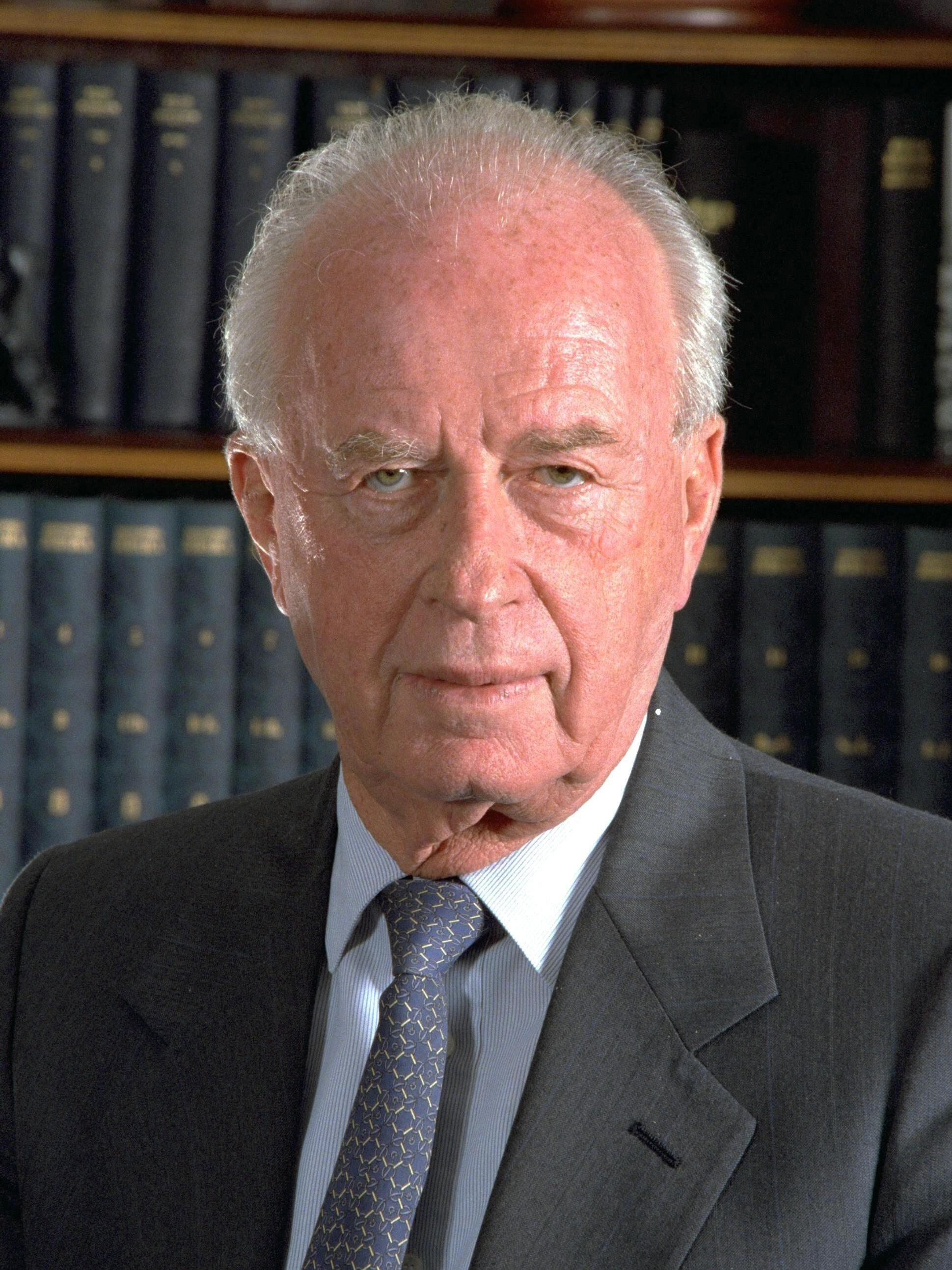
Yitzhak Rabin

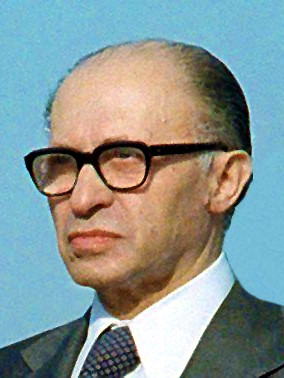
Menachem Begin

Israel's prime minister Golda Meir resigned in 1974 and was succeeded by Yitzhak Rabin. Rabin resigned in 1977 and was later that same year succeeded by Menachem Begin.

==== Peace treaty ====
Between 1975 and 1977, Sadat made two pivotal decisions: first, to abandon Nasser’s state socialist model in favor of economic liberalization—known as the “infitah” or economic opening—with support from foreign partners; and second, to initiate direct peace talks with Israel.

In November 1977, Sadat made a surprise visit to Jerusalem. The purpose of the visit was to address the Knesset, the legislative body in Israel, to try to advance the Israeli-Arab peace process. Sadat met with senior Israeli officials, including prime minister Begin. It was the first visit of its kind by an Arab leader to Israel. At that time, the two countries were considered at war.

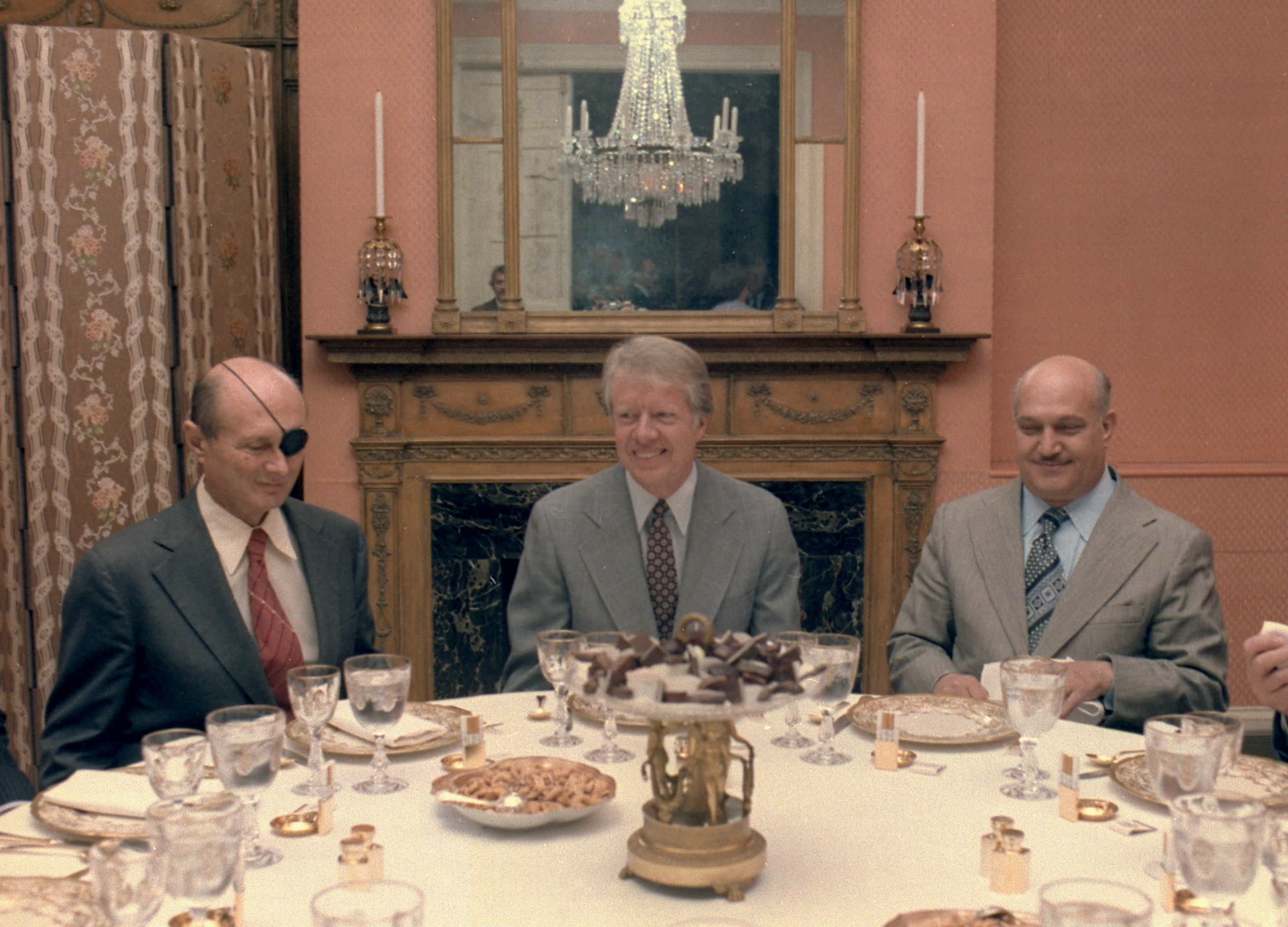
Jimmy Carter, Moshe Dayan and Kamal Hassan Ali at Blair House, 1978.

The process advanced with U.S. sponsorship, led personally by U.S. president Jimmy Carter, culminating in direct talks between Sadat and Begin at Camp David in September 1978. The resulting Camp David Accords paved the way for a peace treaty. Shortly after the accords, Sadat and Begin were awarded the 1978 Nobel Peace Prize for their efforts. In his acceptance speech, Sadat referred to the long-awaited peace desired by both Arabs and Israelis.

The Egyptian–Israeli peace treaty was signed on 26 March 1979. Under the agreement, Israel committed to a full withdrawal from the Sinai Peninsula, and both countries agreed to establish normal diplomatic relations. Egypt also formally recognized the state of Israel. Under the treaty’s security arrangements, Israel maintained a 100-meter-wide patrol corridor along the Gaza–Egypt border—later known as the Philadelphi Corridor.

Normalization of relations between Israel and Egypt took effect in January 1980. Ambassadors were exchanged the following month, with Eliyahu Ben-Elissar as the first Israeli Ambassador to Egypt, and Saad Mortada as the first Egyptian Ambassador to Israel. The boycott laws were repealed by Egypt's parliament the same month, and some trade began to develop, albeit less than Israel had hoped for. In March 1980 regular airline flights were inaugurated. Egypt also began supplying Israel with crude oil. The peace treaty directly violated the 1967 Khartoum Resolution which laid out no peace, negotiation, nor recognition of Israel, leading to Egypt’s suspension from the Arab League in 1979, lasting until 1989.

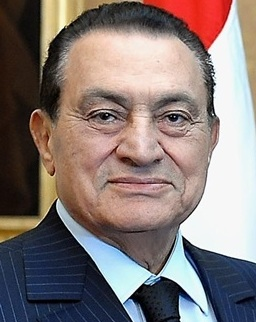
Hosni Mubarak

In 1981, Sadat was assassinated by extremists led by Khalid Al-Islambuli who opposed his reconciliation with Israel. Sufi Abu Taleb took over as interim with Hosni Mubarak officially succeeding Anwar Sadat about two weeks later. Mubarak upheld Egypt’s commitment to the Camp David peace framework while simultaneously working to restore the country’s leadership role in the Arab world.

=== Cold peace ===
==== 1982 Lebanon War ====
In June 1982, Israel invaded southern Lebanon, marking the start of the 1982 Lebanon War. During the conflict, Lebanese Christian militias allied with the Israel Defense Forces (IDF) carried out the Sabra and Shatila massacre in Beirut. In protest against Israel's actions, Egypt recalled its ambassador from Tel Aviv, marking the most serious diplomatic rift between the two countries since the normalization of ties under the Camp David Accords. While the move was significant, it stopped short of a full break in diplomatic relations. Egypt's foreign minister Kamal Hassan Ali condemned Israel's actions in Lebanon as completely unjustified and reaffirmed Egypt's demand for Israel's immediate withdrawal from Lebanon. He also warned that a continued Israeli presence in Lebanon could affect normal relations between Egypt and Israel. The minister previously stated that Egypt had not signed new agreements with Israel since its invasion of Lebanon in June, though oil sales continued at 14 million barrels per year. Israeli ships still transited the Suez Canal, and tourism between the two countries persisted.

==== Cold peace ====
In Israel, the initial response to the peace treaty was one of optimism and high expectations for a warm and comprehensive relationship with Egypt. However, this soon gave way to disappointment as Egypt limited its engagement to formal diplomatic ties, leading to a "cold peace". Scholars have debated the causes and context behind the emergence of the “cold peace.” One perspective attributes it primarily to the policies of the Egyptian leadership, which is seen as having intentionally slowed the normalization process out of fear that closer ties with the other side’s society could destabilize Egypt internally and diminish its regional influence. An alternative view points to Israeli actions in the early 1980s as a key factor—such as the 1981 strike on Iraq’s nuclear reactor, the 1982 Lebanon War, and legislative moves like the Jerusalem Law and the Golan Heights Law. These developments intensified pressure on the Egyptian regime from both Egyptian and broader Arab public opinion, weakening its willingness to pursue normalization. In addition to the two main schools of thought, there is broad agreement that the Palestinian issue remained a major obstacle to deeper relations. President Sadat had underscored its significance and the need for a just resolution at the outset of talks, but the Israeli government had paid little heed to Egypt’s concerns on the matter.

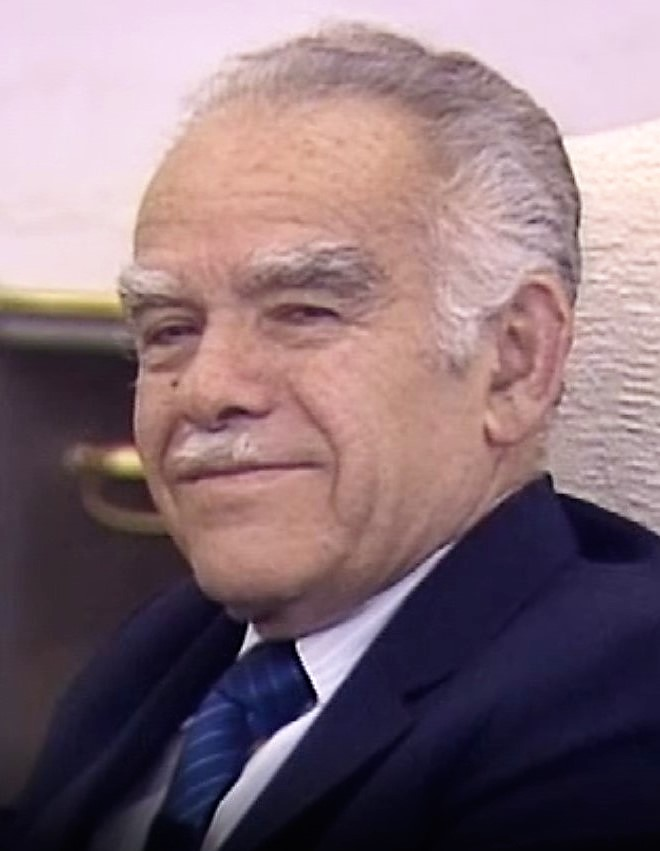
Yitzhak Shamir

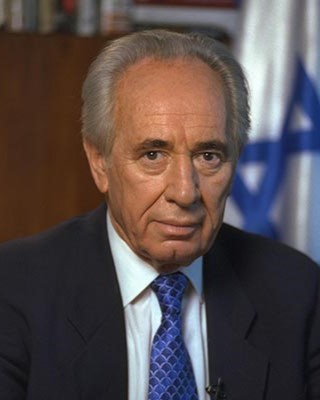
Shimon Peres

In Israel, prime minister Menachim Begin resigned in 1983 and was succeeded by Yitzhak Shamir. In the 1984 election, both Shamir's Likud party and Shimon Peres' Labor lost seats. Peres and Shamir entered into a grand coalition deal in which Peres became prime minister while Shamir was foreign minister until 1986, when Peres and Shamir exchanged roles. Shamir remained prime minister until 1992, while Peres was Acting Prime Minister until 1990. Shamir and Peres often disagreed, for instance in their response to Egypt's peace initiative.

==== Taba ====
In 1906, the British Empire in Egypt and the Ottoman Empire in Palestine had a diplomatic conflict over the territorial status of the town of Taba. The dispute was resolved when both sides agreed to demarcate a formal border, placing Taba on Egypt's side. Following the 1979 peace treaty, Egypt and Israel began negotiating the exact border near Taba, which had been reoccupied by Israel after the 1967 Six-Day war. Although historical maps largely supported Egypt’s claim, Israel argued for a different interpretation of the 1906 Ottoman–British border. During the Alexandria summit in 1986 between then-Egyptian President Hosni Mubarak and then-Israeli Prime Minister Shimon Peres, both sides agreed to resolve their competing sovereignty claims over Taba through binding international arbitration. The international arbitration ruled in Egypt’s favor. In March 1989, Taba was formally returned to Egypt.

During the 1986 Alexandria summit, Egypt and Israel also agreed on letting an Egyptian ambassador return to Israel. The summit was the first meeting between an Egyptian president and an Israeli prime minister since Sadat met Begin in 1981. The meeting formalized the recent thaw in Israeli–Egyptian relations, but it also exposed a deep divide over the Palestinian issue, which remained a major point of tension with long-term implications for bilateral ties.

=== Regional entanglements ===
==== First intifada and Hamas ====
In the 1979 peace treaty, the city of Rafah was split between the Egyptian sector and the Israeli-occupied Gaza Strip sector, separating families and leading to the construction of underground tunnels for communication. These tunnels later evolved into smuggling routes, driven by economic incentives, as subsidized Egyptian gasoline could be sold at a profit in Gaza. Other black market goods were also trafficked through them.

By the time of the First Intifada (1987-1993), the first large-scale Palestinian uprising against Israel in the West Bank and the Gaza Strip, Israel was increasingly concerned about arms and fighters moving through the tunnels. Its efforts to shut them down drew criticism due to the civilian casualties and housing destruction that resulted from these operations.

The Muslim Brotherhood, founded in Egypt in 1928, was an Islamist movement that promoted political Islam and social reform. It was often seen as a threat by Egypt’s secular and military-backed leadership, and was periodically banned and repressed. In 1987, during the early days of the Intifada, the Palestinian Islamist movement Hamas was founded in Gaza as an offshoot of the Brotherhood. Although rooted in the Palestinian territories, Hamas drew ideological inspiration and organizational models from its Egyptian predecessor. This connection added a new layer of complexity to Egypt–Israel relations. While Egypt viewed Hamas with suspicion due to its ties to the Muslim Brotherhood, Israel initially gave discreet support to the group as a counterweight to the secular PLO’s dominance in the Palestinian areas.

==== Egyptian diplomacy ====
Since 1985, then-President Mubarak was actively involved in diplomatic efforts aimed at resolving the Israeli–Palestinian conflict. He focused on fostering regional stability and curbing the influence of extremist movements. Together with other countries, Mubarak participated in the 1991 Madrid Conference which was an attempt by the international community to revive the Israeli–Palestinian peace process through negotiations. The bilateral Israeli–Palestinian negotiations eventually led to the subsequent signing of the Oslo I Accord, the 1994 Cairo Agreement and the Oslo II Accord in 1995, which were key milestones in the Israeli–Palestinian peace process. The latter two were signed in Egypt. The Cairo summit of February 1995 reflected a shared commitment by Egypt, Israel, Jordan, and the PLO to support ongoing negotiations and resist efforts by opponents of the Middle East peace process.

In 1992, the Israeli Labor Party won the elections and Yitzhak Rabin was prime minister until his assassination in 1995. He was succeeded by Shimon Peres.

==== Disputes over Israel’s nuclear policy ====
In 1960, the United States had become increasingly concerned that Israel was building a nuclear weapons program. While Israeli leaders regarded a nuclear capability as essential for safeguarding the country against existential threats, officials publicly maintained that Israel’s nuclear reactor was intended solely for peaceful purposes. Over time, Israel adopted a policy of deliberate ambiguity, neither confirming nor denying the possession of nuclear weapons. Israel never signed the Treaty on the Non-Proliferation of Nuclear Weapons (NPT), a global agreement aimed at preventing the spread of nuclear weapons and promoting disarmament.

The 1991 The Madrid Conference also created several multilateral working groups, including Arms Control and Regional Security (ACRS). Early in the ACRS talks, Egypt pushed to put Israel’s nuclear policy on the agenda, arguing that regional peace required an end to Israel’s nuclear monopoly. Israel declined to engage in detailed discussions on the issue, insisting that regional security must first be built on peace agreements and confidence-building measures. Until such conditions were met, Israel maintained that its policy of nuclear ambiguity would remain in place. As a result, by early 1995, the ACRS talks had reached an impasse over the dispute concerning Israel’s nuclear policy.

By late 1994, the broader Arab-Israeli peace process had yielded several new agreements, but Egypt, having already signed peace with Israel in 1979, was not involved. During this period, Egyptian-Israeli relations largely focused on disputes over Israel’s nuclear policy. In August 1994, Egyptian foreign minister Amr Moussa made a tense visit to Israel, pressing the country to join the NTP. His refusal to visit the Yad Vashem Holocaust Memorial drew criticism, and the nuclear issue dominated public exchanges. The visit marked the start of a more confrontational phase in Egypt–Israel relations, followed by a series of meetings centered on the NPT dispute.

In the lead-up to and during the April 1995 NPT Review Conference, Egypt launched a major campaign targeting Israel’s nuclear policy and its refusal to join the treaty. Alongside other Arab states and Iran, Egypt pressed Israel to abandon its longstanding policy of nuclear ambiguity, accede to the NPT, and place its nuclear facilities under international safeguards within a set timeframe. Israel rejected these demands, arguing that its virtual nuclear capability served as a vital deterrent given its perceived vulnerabilities in size, population, and conventional military strength.

The conference concluded with unanimous agreement to extend the treaty indefinitely, without any shift in Israel’s nuclear position. However, the accompanying Middle East Resolution left room for continued dispute. Egypt quickly signaled that the matter was unresolved, and tensions over Israel’s nuclear policy persisted in subsequent forums. The disagreement strained Egyptian-Israeli relations and negatively impacted the broader Arab-Israeli peace process.

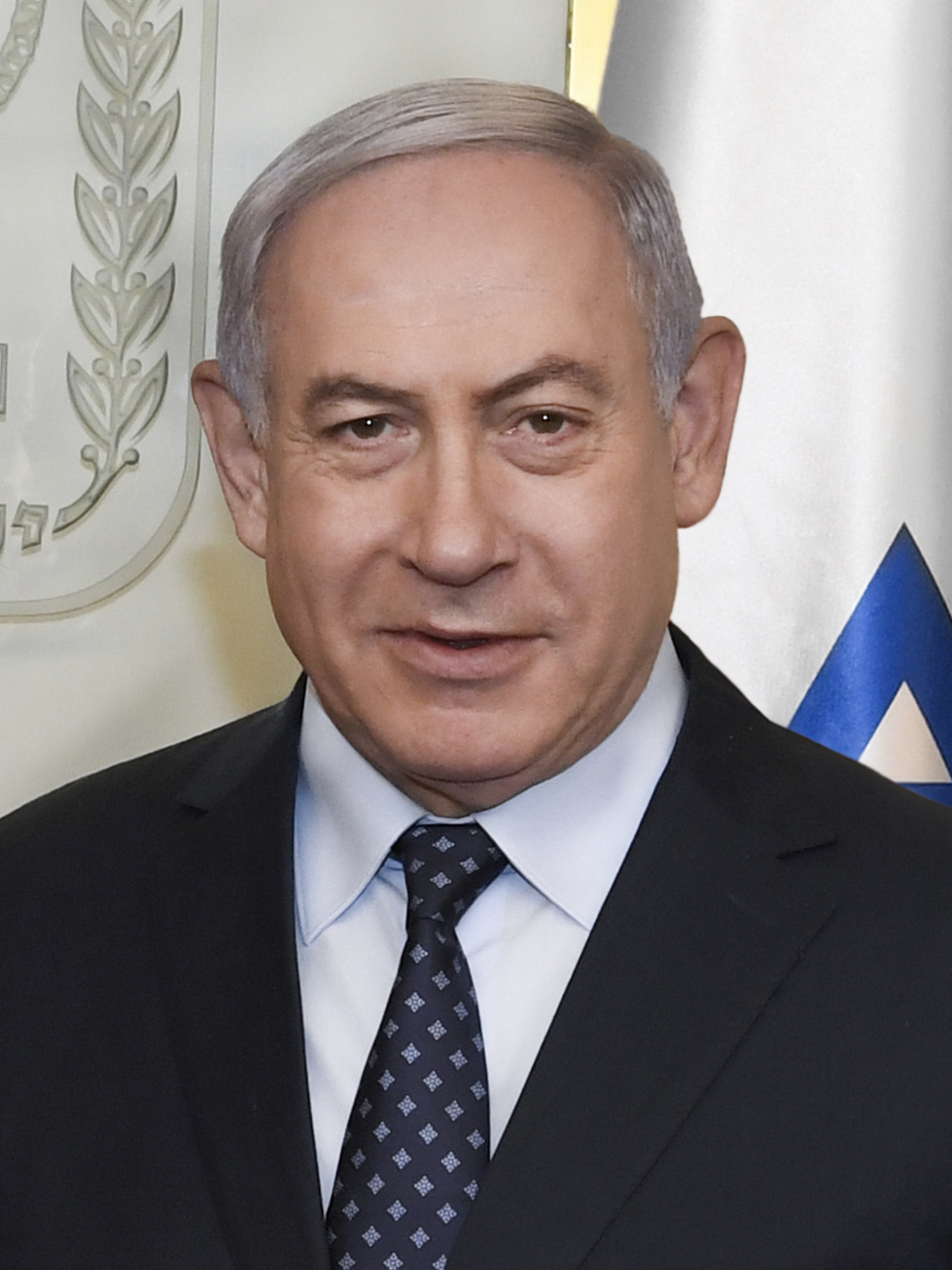
Benjamin Netanyahu

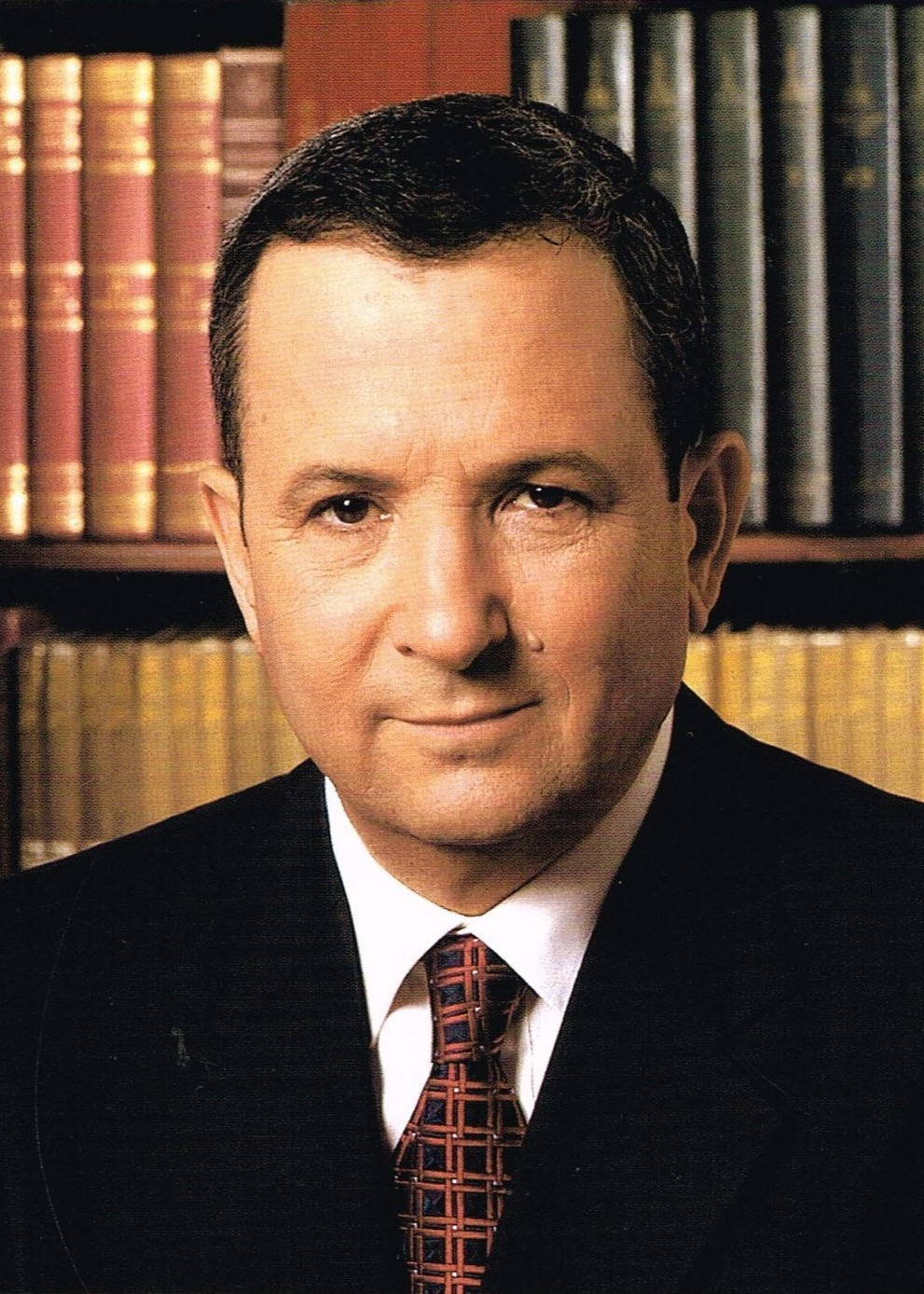
Ehud Barak

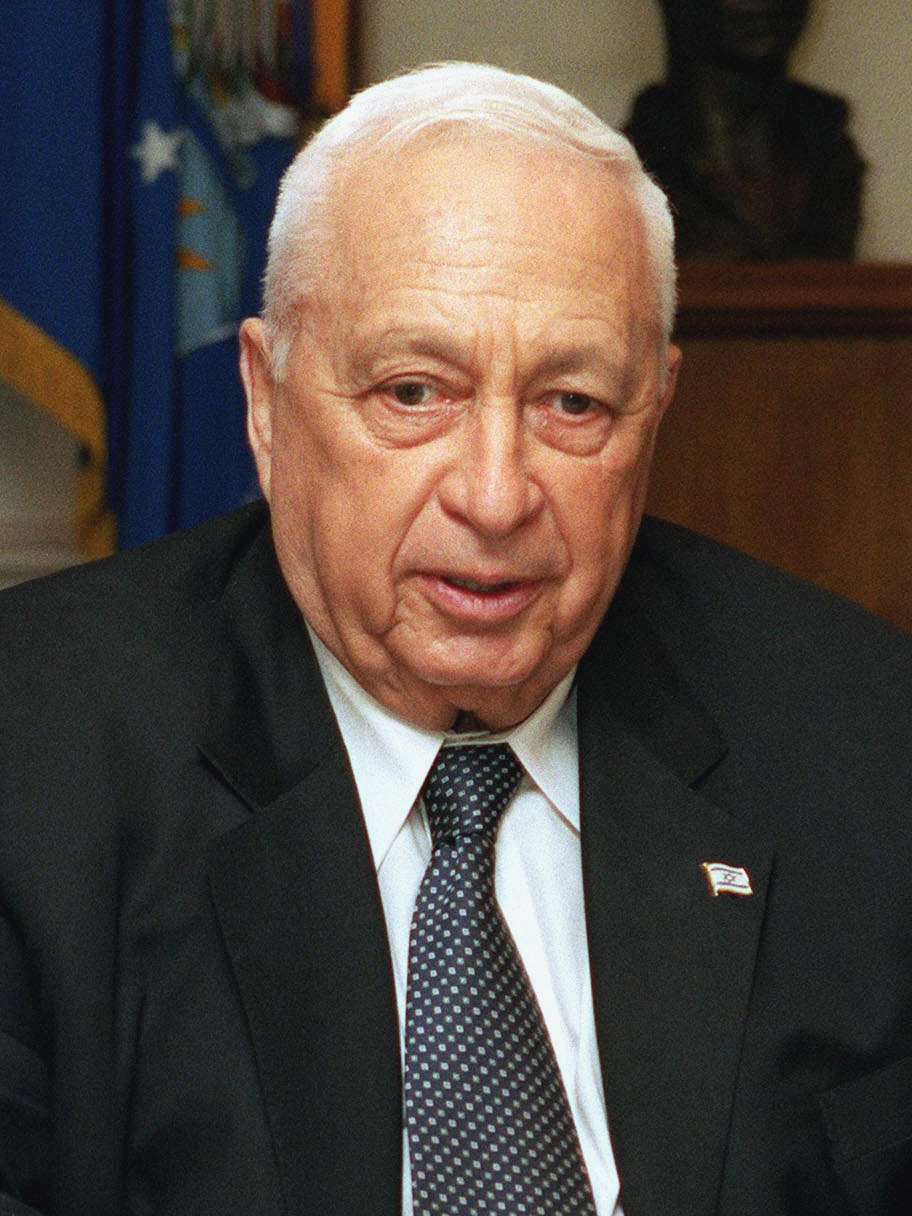
Ariel Sharon

Israeli prime minister Peres lost the 1996 elections to Benjamin Netanyahu, who was Israel's prime minister until 1999. During Netanyahu’s first term as prime minister, ties between Egypt and Israel deteriorated significantly. Key Israeli moves on the Palestinian front — including the opening of a tunnel in Jerusalem (1996) and plans for a major housing project at Har Homa (1997) — provoked strong Egyptian criticism. Egypt increasingly viewed Netanyahu as unwilling to advance the peace process or uphold prior commitments regarding Palestinian statehood. Tensions were further exacerbated by Egyptian military exercises near the Suez Canal, interpreted by some observers as preparation for potential conflict. Egyptian foreign minister Amr Moussa described the state of peace during this period as the lowest point since Sadat’s historic visit to Jerusalem.

Netanyahu lost the 1999 election to Ehud Barak, who was then defeated in 2001 by Ariel Sharon.

==== Second Intifada unrest and diplomacy ====
The Second Intifada, a major uprising by Palestinians against Israel and its occupation, started in 2000. In Egypt, the intifada sparked a wave of protests in solidarity with the Palestinians. Tens of thousands joined street demonstrations which also criticized President Mubarak’s government and other Arab regimes for their perceived failure to support the Palestinian cause. The protests soon broadened to include demands for political reform and social justice. In response, police forces arrived to suppress the nonviolent demonstrations.

In protest over Israel’s response to the intifada, Egypt recalled its ambassador in late 2000 and only restored full diplomatic ties in 2005. Nonetheless, Egyptian president Mubarak hosted the Taba Summit in January 2001 with talks between Israel and the Palestinian Authority. The summit concluded without a deal, though a joint statement affirmed the parties’ commitment to continue negotiations. However, the negotiations were abandoned when Ehud Barak lost the election to Ariel Sharon just weeks later.

In 2004, contacts between Mubarak and Israeli prime minister Sharon intensified. Egypt and Israel coordinated logistics for Sharon’s planned 2005 Gaza disengagement. The two leaders praised each other in public, with Mubarak calling Sharon the most promising partner for advancing Palestinian statehood. In December, the thaw in relations was evident: Egypt released alleged Israeli spy Azzam Azzam, while Israel freed six Egyptian students and announced the release of 170 Palestinian prisoners as a goodwill gesture to Mubarak. That month, Egypt, Israel, and the United States also signed a trade agreement in Cairo.

In 2006, Israeli Prime Minister Ariel Sharon was succeeded by Ehud Olmert. In 2009, he was succeeded by Benjamin Netanyahu.

=== Borders ===
==== Egypt-Gaza border ====
===== Philadelphi corridor =====
The Egypt-Gaza border is 12 km long. Under the 1979 peace treaty, Israel maintained a 100-metre patrol corridor along this border, later known as the Philadelphi Corridor. It was 20–40 meters wide with a 2.5 to 3 metres high concrete wall topped with barbed wire. During the Second Intifada, starting in 2000, Israel widened the buffer zone to 200–300 meters and built a barrier wall mostly of corrugated sheet metal, with some concrete sections.

===== Rafah border crossing =====
In 2005, Israel withdrew from Gaza. Egypt and Israel agreed on security arrangements for the Gaza–Egypt border: under the Philadelphi Accord, Egypt deployed 750 border guards; under the Agreement on Movement and Access, the Palestinian Authority administered the Rafah crossing with European Union supervision while Israel monitored remotely and could object to entries. Rafah is the only border crossing between Egypt and Gaza, and Gaza’s sole border point with a country other than Israel. For seven months, the crossing functioned smoothly, with around 1,320 people crossing daily. Although the agreement allowed goods to transit Rafah, Egyptian President Mubarak did not permit such exports. Instead, imports from Egypt to Gaza were diverted to the nearby Kerem Shalom crossing, fueling disputes over border control.

On 25 June 2006, Israeli soldier Gilad Shalit was abducted. Israel closed the Rafah crossing, citing security concerns. It was subsequently opened only sporadically and without prior notice. Between then and June 2007, it remained closed for 265 days. In 2007, Hamas seized control of the Gaza strip in a conflict with Fatah. Israel suspended the Crossings Agreement, and Egypt and Israel worked together to keep Rafah shut. Since then, the Rafah crossing has remained largely closed. Mubarak stated he would keep the border closed until the authority of the Palestinian Authority president (Fatah) was restored in Gaza. He also sought to isolate Hamas and prevent its influence from spreading into Egypt, where he had long worked to suppress the Muslim Brotherhood, Hamas’s parent movement.

===== Smuggling tunnels =====
The Gaza smuggling tunnels run beneath the Gaza–Egypt border to bypass the rarely opened Rafah Border Crossing. The blockade's import restrictions, created shortages of building materials, fuel, consumer goods, and medical supplies, which spurred an increase in tunnels under the Egypt–Gaza border. For most Gazans the tunnels were the only way to move from and to Gaza.

The smuggling strained Egypt–Israel relations. From 2006, Israeli officials and lawmakers accused Egypt of failing to curb tunnel smuggling, saying Egypt ignored shared intelligence and that Palestinian armed groups were bringing in advanced weapons. Some urged freezing U.S. military aid unless stronger action was taken. By late 2007, Israeli foreign Minister Tzipi Livni said Egypt’s performance at the border harmed progress in the peace process. Egypt rejected the charges; Mubarak said Livni had crossed a “red line,” and Egyptian foreign minister Ahmed Aboul Gheit warned that attempts to damage U.S.–Egypt ties would prompt steps against Israeli interests. Egypt argued it was constrained by limited resources and that Israeli tips were often too imprecise to act upon. Tensions eased somewhat after high-level meetings in late 2007, with both governments reaffirming the peace treaty and committing to manage disputes through ongoing dialogue.

==== Egypt-Israel border ====
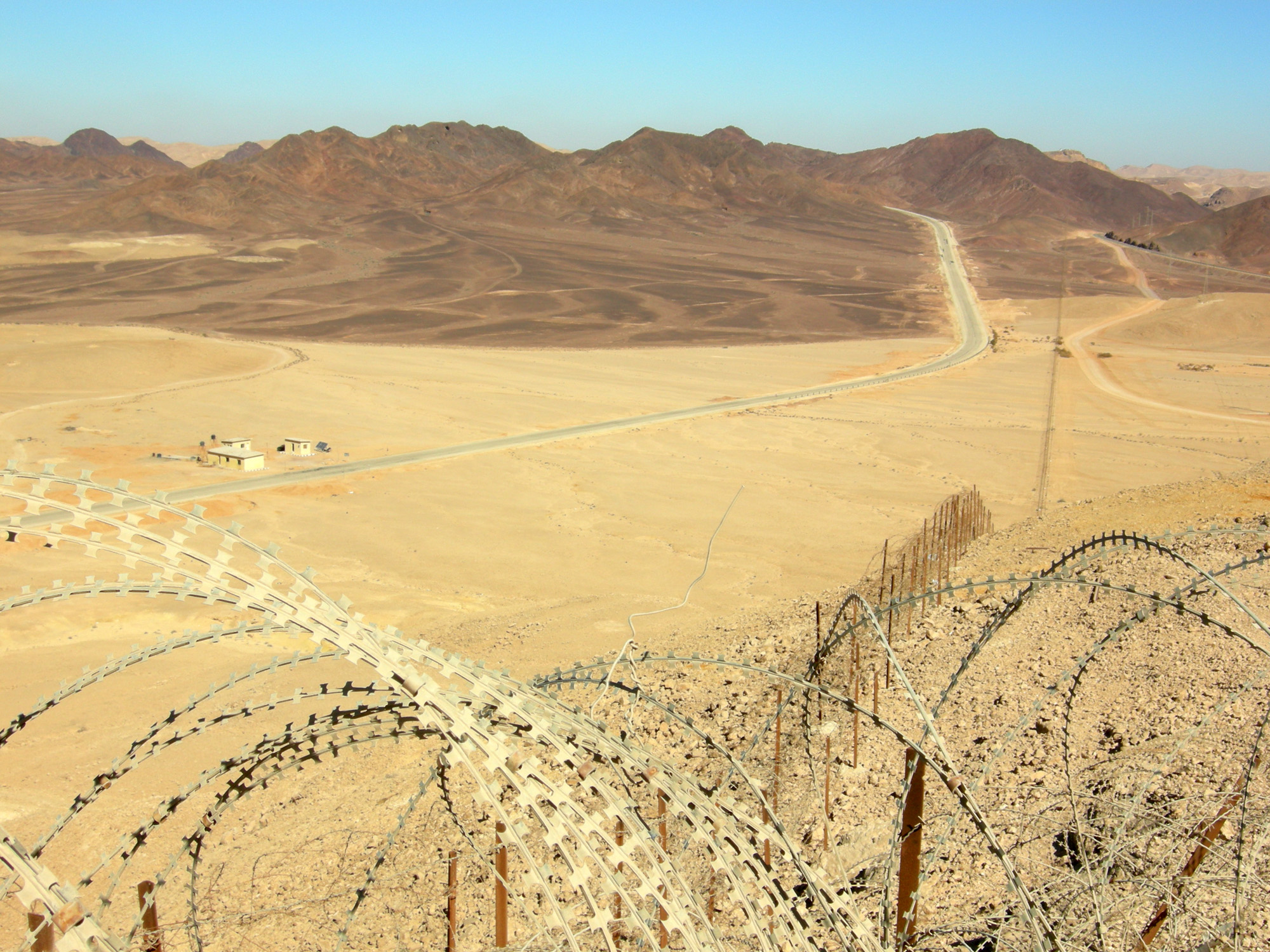
Egypt-Israeli border north of Eilat

In November 2010 Israel began construction on a 5-meter-high fence along its border with Egypt known as the Egypt–Israel barrier and was completed by December 2013. The fence stretches along 245 kilometers, from the Kerem Shalom passage in the north to Eilat in the south. The fence was planned to block the infiltration of refugees and asylum seekers from Africa, but took on heightened urgency with the fall of Mubarak's regime.

=== Regional realignment ===
During the 2008–2009 Gaza war, Egypt played a central mediating role, holding talks and passing proposals between the sides in an effort to bring the fighting to an end. Egypt's efforts led to a six-months ceasefire between Israel and Hamas. Egypt also served as a principal intermediary between Israel and Hamas over the capture of Gilad Shalit, facilitating indirect negotiations that culminated in his 2011 release in a prisoner exchange.

==== Egyptian revolution ====
The Egyptian Revolution of 2011, part of the Arab Spring, led to fears in Israel about the future of the treaty. Israeli Prime Minister Benjamin Netanyahu stated initially that he expected any new Egyptian government to adhere to the peace treaty with Israel, as it had served both countries well. After the Egyptian Army took power on 11 February 2011, it announced that Egypt would continue to abide by all its international and regional treaties. Yet Israeli-Egyptian relations reached their lowest level since the 1979 Egypt–Israel peace treaty. The Israeli-Egyptian border became a region of conflict and instability following the rise of terrorist activity in the Sinai Peninsula and following hostility manifestation from masses of Egyptian protesters against Israel in the streets of Cairo. During the final years of the Mubarak administration, the leading Egyptian official conducting contacts with Israel had been the head of Egyptian intelligence Omar Suleiman. Suleiman was ousted from power at the same time as Mubarak, and Israel was said to have very few channels of communication open with Egypt during the events of 2011.

Egypt undermined the Israeli blockade of the Gaza Strip by opening the Rafah border to persons in May 2011. The Muslim Brotherhood in the Egyptian parliament wished to open trade across the border with Gaza, a move said to be resisted by Egypt's Tantawi government.

In the 2011 attack on the Israeli Embassy in Egypt, thousands of Egyptian demonstrators broke into the Israeli embassy in Cairo on Friday, September 9. The Egyptian police stationed at the site attempted to bar entry, firing tear gas into the crowd. After demonstrators entered the first section of the building, the Israeli ambassador and the staff of the embassy were evacuated by Egyptian commandos. After the attack, Israel flew out the Israeli ambassador and about 85 other diplomats and their family members. Following the attack, the Egyptian army declared a state of emergency in the country. Egyptian officials condemned the attack and said that the events were part of an external conspiracy to hurt the stability and foreign relations of Egypt.

Egypt's post-Mubarak rulers were instrumental in mediating between Hamas and Israel for the Gilad Shalit prisoner exchange that led to the liberation of Israeli soldier Gilad Shalit in exchange for 1,027 Palestinian prisoners between October and December 2011.

After an exchange of rocket fire between Gaza and Israel in March 2012, the Egyptian parliamentary committee for Arab affairs urged the Egyptian government to recall its ambassador to Israel from Tel Aviv, and deport Israel's ambassador in Egypt. This was largely symbolic since only the ruling military council can make such decisions.

In 2012, the Muslim Brotherhood declared their support for the peace treaty, and Israeli Prime Minister Benyamin Netanyahu affirmed he had no problem dealing with the Muslim Brotherhood so long as the peace treaty was respected. Post Mubarak, the Egyptian authorities continued to protect an IDF memorial in the Sinai in keeping with their treaty obligations. The Israelis remained positive about the treaty after MB candidate Mohammed Morsi was elected president in June 2012.

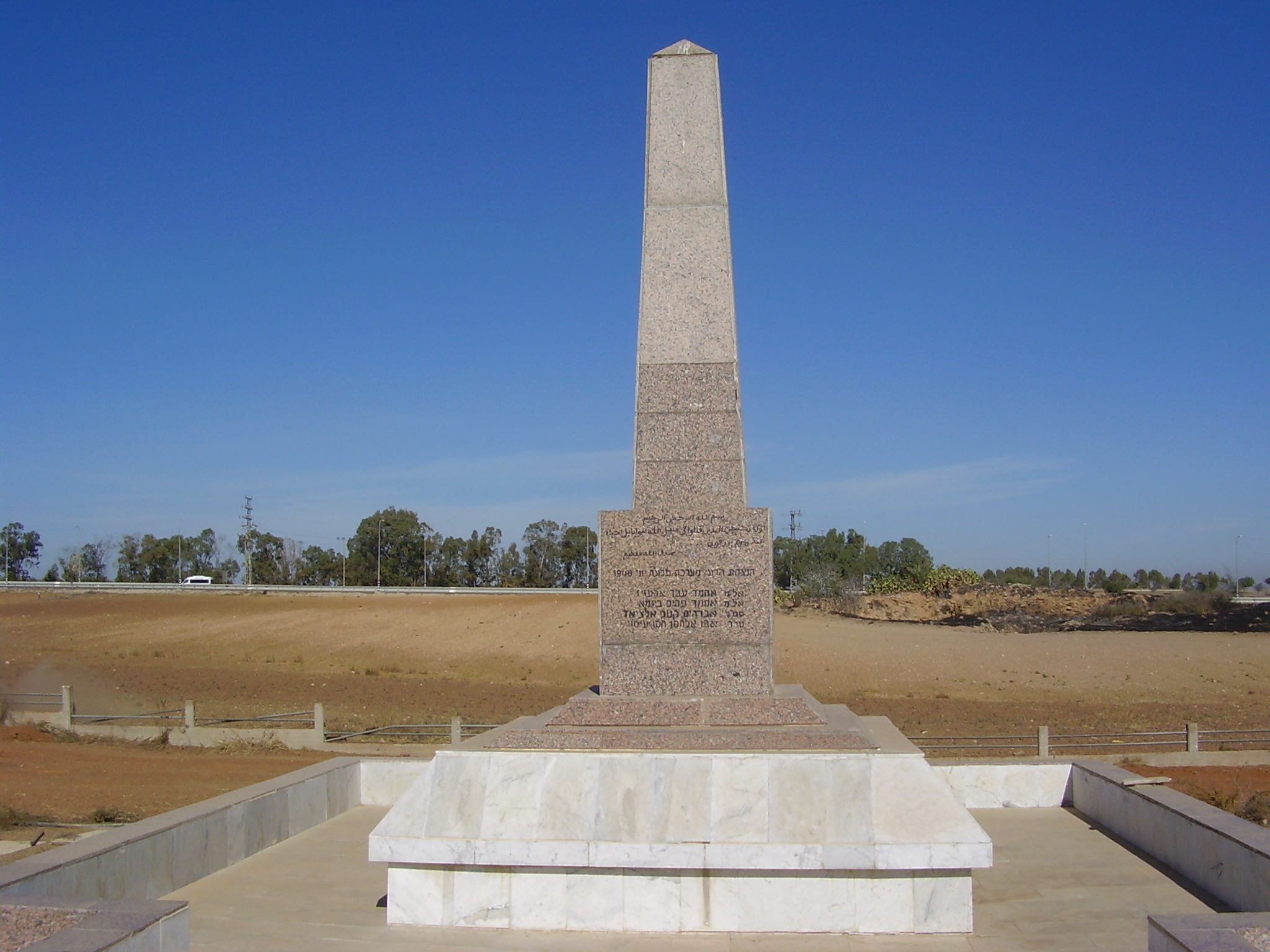
Egyptian army memorial in Israel

On 24 August 2012, a senior Egyptian military source said that Egyptian Defense Minister Abdel Fattah el-Sissi and Israeli Defense Minister Ehud Barak have reached an agreement on the issue of the militarization of the Sinai. Al Hayat reported that Sissi phoned Barak and said that Egypt was committed to maintaining the peace treaty with Israel. Sissi also said that the militarization was temporary, and was needed for security and to fight terrorism. However, an Israeli defense official denied that such a conversation took place.

In August 2012, the Egyptian military entered the de-militarized zone without Israeli approval, in violation of the peace treaty terms. Egypt has also been reported to have deployed anti-air missiles on the Israeli border, a move which clearly targets Israel, as the Bedouin groups in the Sinai have no aircraft. However other news agencies had reported that the Egyptian military had actually seized anti-aircraft, anti-tank and anti-personnel weaponry which was destined to be smuggled into the Hamas held Gaza strip. This was in addition to destroying over 100 tunnels used for smuggling. In late August 2012, Morsi said that the security operations do not threaten anyone, and "there should not be any kind of international or regional concerns at all from the presence of Egyptian security forces." Morsi added that the campaign was in "full respect to international treaties."

On 8 September 2012, an Israeli official confirmed that coordination exists between Israel and Egypt regarding Operation Eagle. Egyptian Military spokesman Ahmed Mohammed Ali had earlier announced that Egypt has been consulting with Israel regarding its security measures in the Sinai.

Relations have improved significantly between Israel and Egypt after the removal of Morsi from office in July 2013, with close military cooperation over the Sinai insurgency. Notably, Israel has permitted Egypt to increase its number of troops deployed in the Sinai peninsula beyond the terms of the peace treaty. These developments, along with deteriorating Israel-Jordan relations, have led some to brand Egypt as Israel's "closest ally" in the Arab world, while others assert that relations remain relatively cold. Sisi has maintained the policy of previous Egyptian presidents of pledging not to visit Israel until Israel recognizes Palestinian statehood, although his Foreign Minister, Sameh Shoukry, has visited Israel.

On 2 July 2015, one day after the attacks on 15 Egyptian Army checkpoints, Israel announced that it was giving Egypt a "free hand to operate in northern Sinai against local jihadist groups, voluntarily ignoring an annex to the 1979 Camp David Peace Accords banning the presence of significant Egyptian forces in the area." Israel also initiated a covert air campaign in support of the Egyptian forces in Sinai, carrying out frequent airstrikes against jihadists in coordination with Egypt. This marks the first time Israel and Egypt has fought on the same side in a war. To prevent a backlash in Egypt, both countries attempted to hide Israel's involvement, and Israeli drones, planes and helicopters carrying out missions in Sinai were all unmarked.

On November 3, 2015, Egypt voted for Israel joining the UNOOSA, marking the first time in history that Egypt has ever voted in Israel's favor at the United Nations.

Relations further improved after the election of Donald Trump as President of the United States and the ascension of Mohammed bin Salman to Crown Prince of Saudi Arabia, with Egypt joining these nations in pressuring the Palestinian Authority and Jordan to accept U.S.-led peace proposals.

On 22 March 2022, Sisi met with President of the United Arab Emirates Mohamed bin Zayed Al Nahyan and Naftali Bennett in Egypt. They discussed trilateral relations, Russo-Ukrainian War and the Iran nuclear deal.

==== Gaza war ====
Following the start of the Gaza war in October 2023, the Egyptian government organized nationwide protests against Israel, reflecting growing public anger and signaling a sharp escalation in its stance. As the war progressed, Egypt feared that Israel might attempt to expel Gaza’s population—either directly or by making life untenable through widespread and indiscriminate attacks on civilian infrastructure. In response, Egypt firmly opposed suggestions by some Israeli officials that Palestinians should relocate to Sinai and has sought to prevent such displacement.

Egypt’s stance reflects both its longstanding support for the Palestinian cause and deep-rooted mistrust of Israeli intentions. Egyptian authorities also fear that a mass influx of Palestinians—potentially including militants—could destabilize the Sinai region and reignite the jihadist insurgency that plagued it in previous years. Furthermore, Egyptian officials have long feared a repeat of the 1948 Nakba—when Palestinians were expelled from their homeland and prevented from returning by the newly established Israeli state.

Egypt played an active diplomatic role in efforts to end the war, working alongside Qatar to mediate between Israel and Hamas. Their joint efforts focused on securing a ceasefire, facilitating hostage and prisoner exchanges, and enabling a significant increase in humanitarian aid to Gaza. According to multiple sources familiar with the negotiations, Egyptian intelligence quietly altered the terms of a ceasefire proposal that had already been approved by Israel, derailing a potential agreement that might have secured the release of hostages and prisoners and paused the fighting in Gaza. The version later announced by Hamas on 6 May did not match what U.S. and Qatari officials believed had been submitted for final review. The unreported changes sparked frustration among negotiators from the U.S., Qatar, and Israel, contributing to a breakdown in the talks. Egypt rejected the allegation.

Tensions between Egypt and Israel escalated over the issue of cross-border tunnels. In January 2024, Israel signaled its intention to seize control of the Philadelphi Corridor, a 14 km stretch along Gaza’s border with Egypt. The corridor had been patrolled by Israeli forces until their 2005 withdrawal under the Philadelphi Accord, after which Egypt and the Palestinian Authority assumed control. Israel cited the need to stop weapons smuggling to Hamas, but Egypt firmly rejected the idea, viewing any Israeli presence in the corridor as a breach of the accord and a threat to its national security. Egyptian officials stated that over 1,500 tunnels had already been destroyed.

Israeli-Egyptian relations worsened further in May 2024, when Israeli forces entered parts of Rafah. On 7 May, Israeli troops seized the Palestinian side of the Rafah crossing, temporarily closing it along with the Kerem Shalom crossing. The flow of humanitarian aid into Gaza dropped sharply, deepening the crisis in Gaza. Egypt issued a formal protest condemning Israel’s occupation of the Rafah crossing. Around the same time, Israeli forces reported discovering at least fifty tunnels extending into Egyptian territory—an embarrassment for Egypt that led to allegations of negligence or corruption in failing to stop the continued smuggling.

Humanitarian aid also became a source of tension between Egypt and Israel. Both sides have blamed each other for prolonged delays in delivering assistance to Gaza, with disputes intensifying after Israel's Rafah offensive. In response, Egypt halted aid shipments waiting at the border, with officials insisting that no trucks would be sent as long as Israel occupied the crossing. A U.S. official stated that Egypt was withholding UN aid to avoid appearing complicit in Israel’s control of the gateway. While Egypt later allowed some trucks to reroute through the Kerem Shalom crossing, it maintained the closure of Rafah, previously the primary entry point for international assistance. This move was widely seen as a form of protest against Israel’s actions in Rafah, further straining bilateral relations amid a worsening humanitarian crisis.

Also in May 2024, Egypt decided to support South Africa’s case against Israel at the International Court of Justice, accusing Israel of committing “genocide” against the Palestinians.

On 27 May, Egyptian border forces opened fire on Israeli troops operating in Rafah, reportedly reacting to what they perceived as a massacre unfolding nearby. The exchange resulted in the death of an Egyptian soldier. While such clashes have occurred in the past, this incident marked a serious deterioration in Egypt–Israel relations, reversing years of rapprochement as the Gaza war strains bilateral ties.

On 29 May 2024, the Israeli military announced that it had established “operational control” over the Philadelphi Corridor. Egypt maintained that the Philadelphi Corridor was protected under the 1979 peace treaty and called on Israel to withdraw. Border security is a critical concern for Egypt, driven by fears that Israel’s military offensive could force large numbers of Palestinians into Sinai and trigger renewed militant activity. As of July 2025, Israel continues to occupy the corridor.

In July 2026, Egyptian Foreign Minister Badr Abdelatty explicitly rejected the "Greater Israel" project, asserting that unilateral attempts to redraw the Middle East's map would ultimately fail. He emphasized that no country, regardless of its power, could impose its will on others through coercion or military force. Abdelatty also announced Egypt's opposition to any arrangement that would place Palestinian arms under Israeli control, insisting that such matters must be resolved through internal Palestinian consensus. Additionally, he warned that the deteriorating humanitarian conditions in Gaza—marked by a lack of reconstruction and collapsing infrastructure—could force residents to leave under the guise of "voluntary departure," effectively amounting to forced displacement.

== Border incidents ==
The 2011 southern Israel cross-border attacks took place in August; attackers from Egypt killed eight Israelis. Eight attackers were reportedly killed by Israeli security forces, and two more by Egyptian security. Five Egyptian soldiers were also killed. In response, protesters stormed the Israeli embassy. During the protests, Ahmad Al-Shahhat climbed to the roof of the Israeli Embassy and removed the Israeli flag, which was then burned by protesters.

On 5 August 2012, the a cross-border attack occurred, when armed men ambushed an Egyptian military base in the Sinai Peninsula, killing 16 soldiers and stealing two armored cars, which they used to infiltrate into Israel. The attackers broke through the Kerem Shalom border crossing to Israel, where one of the vehicles exploded. They then engaged in a firefight with soldiers of the Israel Defense Forces, during which six of the attackers were killed. No Israelis were injured.

On 2 June 2023, three Israeli soldiers and an Egyptian policeman were killed in an exchange of fire near the Egyptian-Israeli border. It was the first fatal incident between the two countries in more than a decade.

On 27 May 2024, an Egyptian soldier was killed after a clash between Egyptian and Israeli forces near the Rafah Border Crossing.

== Security cooperation ==
Security cooperation was increased as a result of the 2012 Egyptian–Israeli border attack against Egyptian soldiers in the Sinai and the ensuing Operation Eagle. Egyptian Colonel Ahmed Mohammed Ali said that "Egypt is co-ordinating with the Israeli side over the presence of Egyptian armed forces in Sinai. They know this. The deployment of the armed forces on all the territory of Sinai is not a violation of the peace treaty between Egypt and Israel."

== Economic ties ==
According to the Israel Export & International Cooperation Institute, there were 117 exporters to Egypt active in Israel in 2011 and exports of goods from Israel to Egypt grew by 60% in 2011, to $236 million.

The pipeline which supplies gas from Egypt to Jordan and Israel was attacked eight times between Mubarak's ousting on February 11 and November 25, 2011. Egypt had a 20-year deal to export natural gas to Israel. The deal is unpopular with the Egyptian public and critics say Israel was paying below market price for the gas. Gas supplies to Israel were unilaterally halted by Egypt in 2012 because Israel had allegedly breached its obligations and stopped payments a few months prior. Critical of the decision, Israeli Prime Minister Benjamin Netanyahu also insisted the cut-off was not to do with the peace treaty but rather "a business dispute between the Israeli company and the Egyptian company"; Egyptian Ambassador Yasser Rida also said the Egyptian government saw it as a business disagreement, not a diplomatic dispute. Foreign Minister Avigdor Lieberman said the same, adding that perhaps the gas supplies were being used as campaign material for the Egyptian presidential election. Minister of National Infrastructure Uzi Landau dismissed claims that the dispute was purely commercial in nature.

In December 2025, Israel signed the country's largest gas deal in history, an agreement worth $34.7 billion (₪112 billion) with Egypt.

== See also ==
- History of the Jews in Egypt
- Taba Border Crossing

== Bibliography ==
=== Books ===
- Barnett, Michael N. (1992). Confronting the Costs of War : Military Power, State, and Society in Egypt and Israel. Princeton University Press. ISBN 9781400800292.
- Friedlander, Melvin A. (1983). Sadat and Begin: the Domestic Politics of Peacemaking. Westview Press. ISBN 9781400800292.
- Gat, Moshe (2012). In Search of a Peace Settlement: Egypt and Israel between the Wars, 1967–1973. Princeton University Press. ISBN 9781349350872.
- Gawrych, George W. (2000). The Albatross of Decisive Victory: War and Policy Between Egypt and Israel in the 1967 and 1973 Arab–Israeli Wars. Bloomsbury Academic. ISBN 9780313313028.
- Kilot, Nurit (1995). The Evolution of the Egypt-Israel Boundary: From Colonial Foundations to Peaceful Borders. International Boundaries Research Unit. ISBN 9781897643174.
- Laqueur, Walter, and Dan Schueftan, eds. The Israel–Arab Reader: A Documentary History of the Middle East Conflict (8th ed. Penguin, 2016). online 2001 edition
- Lee, Lai M. (2012). Historical Review of U.S. Foreign Aid as a Tool of Foreign Policy in Israel and Egypt During 1952–1969 (Thesis). School of Advanced Military Studies, United States Army Command and General Staff College.
- Oren, Michael B. (1993). The Origins of the Second Arab-Israel War: Egypt, Israel and the Great Powers, 1952–56. Routledge. ISBN 9781138977792.
- Podeh, Elie (2015). Chances for Peace: Missed Opportunities in the Arab-Israeli Conflict. University of Texas Press. ISBN 9781477312223.
- Sachar, Howard M. (1981). Egypt and Israel. Richard Marek Publishers. ISBN 9780399901249.
- Shalom, Zaki (1999). The Superpowers Israel and the Future of Jordan 1960–63: The Perils of the Pro-Nasser Policy. Sussex Academic Press. ISBN 9781902210148.
- Sharnoff, Michael (2017). Nasser's Peace Egypt's Response to the 1967 War With Israel. Transaction Publishers. ISBN 9781412865159.
- Stein, Kenneth W. (1999). Heroic Diplomacy : Sadat, Kissinger, Carter, Begin and the Quest for Arab–Israeli Peace. Routledge. ISBN 9780415921558.
- Steinberg, Gerald M.; Rubinovitz, Ziv (2017). Menachem Begin and the Israel-Egypt Peace Process: Between Ideology and Political Realism. Indiana University Press. ISBN 9780253071279.
- Sultan, David (2007). Between Cairo and Jerusalem: The Normalization between Arab States and Israel – The Egyptian Case. Tel Aviv University. ISBN 9789657443033.
- Wright, Lawrence (2014). Thirteen days in September : Carter, Begin, and Sadat at Camp David. Oneworld. ISBN 9780385352031.

=== Journal articles ===
- Barak, Eitan (2004). "On the Power of Tacit Understandings – Israel, Egypt and Freedom of Passage through the Suez Canal, 1957-1960". The Middle East Journal. 58 (3): 444–468. doi:10.3751/58.3.6. ISSN 0026-3141.
- Blanga, Yehuda U. (2015). "Nasser's Dilemma: Egypt's Relations with the United States and Israel, 1967–69". Middle Eastern Studies. 51 (2). Routledge: 301–326. doi:10.1080/00263206.2014.942648. ISSN 0026-3206.
- Cohen, Stephen P.; Azar, Edward E. (1981). "From War to Peace: The Transition between Egypt and Israel". The Journal of Conflict Resolution. 25 (1). Sage Publications, Inc.: 87–114. doi:10.1177/002200278102500104. JSTOR 173749.
- Haron, Miriam Joyce (1988). "Note: Israel and the Anglo-Egyptian Negotiations, 1953–1954". Jewish Social Studies. 50 (1). Indiana University Press: 111–116. JSTOR 4467410.
- Landau, Emily B. (2013). "Egypt, Israel, and the WMDFZ Conference for the Middle East: Setting the Record Straight" (PDF). Israel Journal of Foreign Affairs. 7 (1): 13–16. doi:10.1080/23739770.2013.11446529.
- Maoz, Zeev; Astorino, Allison (1992). "The Cognitive Structure of Peacemaking: Egypt and Israel, 1970–1978". International Society of Political Psychology. 13 (4): 647–662. doi:10.2307/3791495. JSTOR 3791495.
- Oren, Michael B. (1989). "Escalation to Suez: The Egypt–Israel Border War, 1949–56". Journal of Contemporary History. 24 (2): 347–373. doi:10.1177/002200948902400208. JSTOR 260827.
- Oren, Michael B. (1990). "Secret Egypt–Israel Peace Initiatives Prior to the Suez Campaign". Middle Eastern Studies. 26 (3): 351–370. doi:10.1080/00263209008700822. JSTOR 4283378.
- Porat, Lian (2014). "The Muslim Brotherhood and Egypt–Israel Peace" (PDF). Begin-Sadat Center for Strategic Studies. JSTOR resrep04744.
- Shikaki, Khalil (1985). "The Nuclearization Debates: The Cases of Israel and Egypt". Journal of Palestine Studies. 14 (4): 77–91. doi:10.2307/2537124. JSTOR 2537124.
- Stein, Janice Gross (2007). "Deterrence and Learning in an Enduring Rivalry: Egypt and Israel, 1948–73". Security Studies. 6 (1): 104–152. doi:10.1080/09636419608429301.
- Yahel, Ido (2016). "Covert Diplomacy Between Israel and Egypt During Nasser Rule: 1952-1970". SAGE Open. 6 (4). doi:10.1177/2158244016667449. ISSN 2158-2440.<
- Zimmerman, John (1979). "The Origins of the Fedeyeen in Nasser's Weltpolitik: Prelude to the Suez War". The Historian. 42 (1). Taylor & Francis, Ltd: 101–118. doi:10.1111/j.1540-6563.1979.tb00576.x. JSTOR 24445290.
