= Eliyahu Ben-Elissar =

Israeli politician and diplomat

Eliahu Ben Elissar
- אליהו בן אלישר
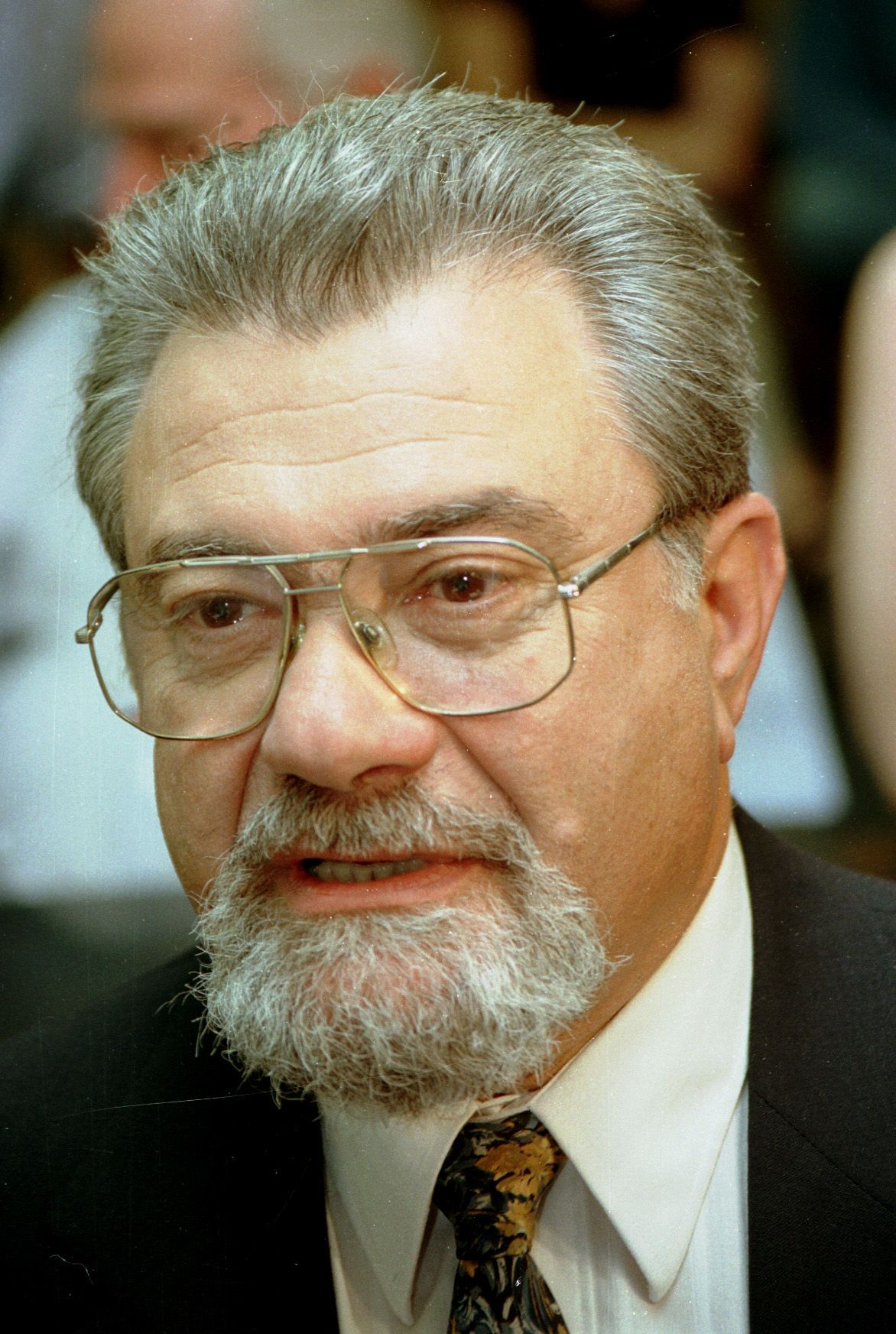

Ambassador of Israel to Egypt
- In office 1980–1981
- Succeeded by: Moshe Sasson

Member of the Knesset for Likud
- In office 1981–1996

Ambassador of Israel to the United States
- In office 1996–1998
- Preceded by: Itamar Rabinovich
- Succeeded by: Zalman Shoval

Ambassador of Israel to France
- In office 1998–2000

Personal details
- Born: 2 August 1932 Radom, Poland
- Died: 12 August 2000 (aged 68) Paris, France
- Party: Likud
- Height: 183 cm (6 ft 0 in)
- Education: University of Paris; University of Geneva; Graduate Institute of International Studies
- Occupation: Politician, Statesman, Author

Eliyahu Ben-Elissar (Hebrew: אליהו בן אלישר; 2 August 1932 - 12 August 2000) was an Israeli politician and diplomat.

== Biography ==
Born Eli Gottlieb in Radom in Poland in 1932, Ben-Elissar was the son of a distinguished family. His parents were Eliezer and Hela (née Dobrzynska) Gottlieb. Eliezer and his brother, Jacob, owned and operated Brago, a successful foundry. Eli was the youngest of three siblings. The eldest, a sister Diana, was born on 7 August 1923, and a brother, Nathan, was born on 21 November 1925.

Ten-year-old Gottlieb immigrated to Mandate Palestine in 1942 with some members of a Radomer family named Graucher using a visa originally obtained for a son who had already been deported by the Nazis. Ironically, the name of the child whose death allowed Eli to survive was named Natan Chaim (Hebrew for "he gave life"). Gottlieb attended the Bilu School in Tel Aviv, joined the Irgun, and served in the IDF until 1965. He subsequently graduated from the University of Paris with a BA in Social Sciences and an MA in International Law and later earned a PhD at the University of Geneva-affiliated Graduate Institute of International Studies.

Being in Palestine during the latter years of the Holocaust, Ben-Elissar did not know the fate of his family until the war's end in 1945. With his father's death in the Flossenbürg concentration camp, and his mother's demise due to a tragic road accident in Germany after the war, Ben-Elissar was orphaned at the age of 14. The effects of the Holocaust were always of great and enduring significance in his life.

In 1947, Ben Elissar's sister, Diana, immigrated to the United States with her new husband, Moshe (Murray) Weinstock. Raising three children, Leo, Allen, and Elaine in Philadelphia, Pennsylvania, Diana remained a steadfast fixture in Ben-Elissar's life. His brother, Nathan, served in the IDF during the 1948 Arab-Israeli War, studied in Vienna, and emigrated to the United States in 1967 where he served as a cantor for many years. Nathan married Rochelle Kelman, and they had a daughter, Nechama.

Ben-Elissar married Diana (née Dudel), and his second wife was Nitza (née Efroni). After receiving his doctorate, Ben Elissar became a journalist and then a spokesman for the Herut party. He was appointed Director-General of the Prime Minister's Office of Menachem Begin in 1977, a position he held until 1980 when he was appointed as Israel's first ambassador to Egypt following the Israel-Egypt Peace Treaty.

In 1981 he left his ambassadorial post, and was elected to the Knesset on the Likud list. During his first Knesset term he chaired the Foreign Affairs and Defense Committee. He was re-elected in 1984, 1988, 1992, and 1996, and again chaired the Foreign Affairs and Defense Committee between 1988 and 1992.

Four months after the 1996 elections he left the Knesset to become ambassador to the United States. In 1998, he was appointed ambassador to France. He authored several books in Hebrew and in French.

He died in Paris on 12 August 2000 of cardiac arrest. He is buried in the Mount of Olives Jewish Cemetery in Jerusalem, next to his mother, sister, brother, sister-in-law, brother-in-law and uncle.

== Bibliography ==
- (with Zeev Schiff) La guerre israelo-arabe 5-10 juin 1967, 1967.
- La diplomatie du Troisieme Reich et les Juifs

Diplomatic posts
Preceded by First post-holder	Israeli Ambassador to Egypt; 1980-1981	Succeeded by Moshe Sasson
Preceded by Avi Pazner	Israeli Ambassador to France; 1998-2000	Succeeded by Élie Barnavi
