= Basel Street =

Street in Tel Aviv, Israel

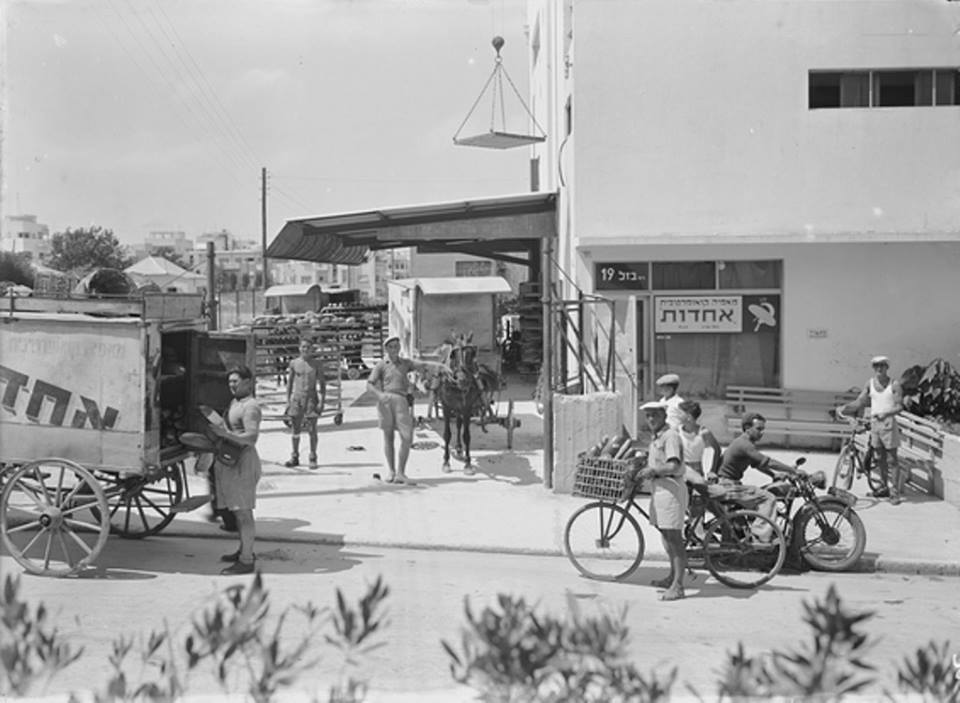
Basel Street (1939)

Basel Street (Hebrew: רחוב בזל, romanized: Rehov Basel) is a major street in Tel Aviv, Israel, named after the Swiss city of Basel, where the First World Zionist Congress took place in 1897 as well as ten subsequent congresses from 1898 until 1946.

Known for its many fashionable boutiques and coffee shops, the 650-meters-long street runs from Dizengoff Street to Ibn Gabirol Street. The area in the vicinity of the street is commonly referred to as the "Basel Compound" (Hebrew: מתחם בזל, romanized: Mitham Basel).

== History ==
The street is part of the historical development of what is now known as the Old North neighborhood in Tel Aviv. The neighborhood was built between the 1930s and 1940s and with its wide streets and numerous green spaces immediately became one of the most fashionable districts for the affluent population of the city. The street was named in honor of the city of Basel in Switzerland and Theodor Herzl's quote after the first World Zionist Congress of 1897: "I founded the Jewish state in Basel".

Today the street is known for its upscale shops and restaurants.
