= Einat Shlain =

Israeli diplomat

Einat Shlain (Hebrew: עינת שליין) is an Israeli diplomat.

Shlein was the first woman to serve as an Israeli Ambassador to an Arab country. She was appointed ambassador to Jordan in 2014.
