= David Govrin =

Israeli diplomat

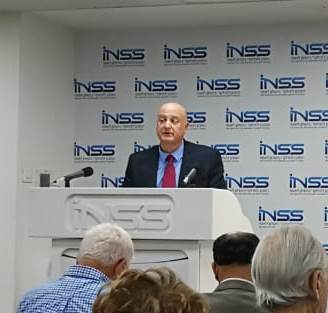
- Born: 23 August 1963 (age 62)
- Occupation: Diplomat
- Years active: 1989–present
- Known for: The Journey to The Arab Spring: The Ideological Roots of the Middle East Upheaval in Arab Liberal Thought (2016)
- Father: Yosef Govrin

David Govrin (born 1963) is an Israeli writer, lecturer and former diplomat, served as an Israeli ambassador to Egypt and Morocco. Since 2025 he serves as a lecturer at the Reichman University and at Ariel University on Diplomacy and Middle East.

== Career ==
Govrin has served as an Israeli diplomat since 1989. He served as the First Secretary at the Israeli Embassy in Egypt (1994–1997) and as a Political Counselor in the Permanent Mission of Israel to the UN. In addition, he has served in a variety of positions in the Israeli Ministry of Foreign Affairs, including that of Head of the Jordanian Department and Head of department in the Ministry's Planning Bureau. He speaks fluent Arabic, and served as Israel's ambassador to Egypt from 2016 to 2020.

In January 2021, the Israeli Ministry of Foreign Affairs nominated Govrin as Israel's permanent ambassador to Morocco after the two countries agreed to normalize ties in a US-brokered agreement in December 2020.

On 5 September 2022, it was announced that Govrin was suspected, following a report by one of the employees, of financial irregularities at the Israeli Mission in Morocco and sexual harassment As a result, the Israeli Ministry of Foreign Affairs decided to return him to Israel for inquiry. After the conclusion of the inquiry, Govrin's name was cleared and he resumed his diplomatic duty in Morocco on 9 July 2023. Following this publication, Govrin filed a defamation lawsuit in the amount of 2.5 Million NIS against Michael Shemesh and the Israeli Public Broadcasting Corporation. As part of a settlement agreement, Shemesh and the Corporation deleted twenty-four publications on the matter and committed to refrain from reporting on Govrin's case in the future.

In March 2026, the President of the Jerusalem District Labour Court, Judge Sarah Breuiner, ruled in favor of Govrin in a lawsuit filed against the Israeli Ministry of Foreign Affairs regarding his recall from Morocco. The court ordered the state to compensate Govrin in the amount of several tens of thousands of shekels.

In 2023, Govrin published his 2nd book Partnership in the Shadow of Rivalry. The book presents and analyzes the relations between Egypt and Israel through Egyptian eyes.

== Education ==
Govrin holds a PhD from the Department of Middle Eastern and Islamic Studies at the Hebrew University of Jerusalem and was a research fellow at the Harry S. Truman Research Institute for the Advancement of Peace until 2016.

== Selected works ==
- The Journey to The Arab Spring: The Ideological Roots of the Middle East Upheaval in Arab Liberal Thought
- Partnership in the Shadow of Rivalry: the relations with Israel through Egyptian eyes
- "Love in the Middle of the Road", a modern Israeli Novel.

== Warning against Egypt's Military buildup ==
Following the launch of his book "Partnership in the Shadow of Rivalry" Govrin gave several interviews to the media in which he warned that Egypt was investing huge sums of money in military buildup, although no country threatened it and despite its difficult economic situation. At the same time, Egypt was investing in military and civilian infrastructure east of the Suez Canal. Israel, he said, must address the capabilities that Egypt is building and not rely on an interpretation of its intentions or interests at present. Intentions and interests can easily change with a change of regime. Govrin pointed to the ongoing erosion of the military annex of the peace agreement and emphasized that "the existence of a hostile public bordering Israel, denying its right to exist and opposing normalization, alongside a massive process of strengthening the Egyptian army, which sees Israel as its main threat – all of these could pose a danger to the State of Israel in a situation of changing circumstances and/or a change of regime, as happened in Egypt in 2012 with the rise of the Muslim Brotherhood." One of the important lessons we learned from 7 October is that we cannot rely on our interpretation of the other side's intentions. We must study its culture, language, and way of thinking, and closely monitor its capacity building.

== Moroccan-Israeli relations in the shadow of the Iron Swords War ==
In an article published at Ariel University, Govrin wrote that the war brought cooperation in many areas to a halt, except security cooperation. The war exposed the gap between the regime, which is interested in continuing ties with Israel, and the general public, which shows deep sympathy for the Palestinians. The Moroccan regime, to Israel's chagrin, refrained from condemning the 7 October massacre, adopted the Arab position expressing solidarity with the Palestinian people, and publicly criticized Israel for harming innocent people. Yet, Govrin assessed that Morocco is still interested in continuing the cooperation with Israel, and that the evidence of this is that Morocco refrained from recalling its ambassador from Israel throughout the war and that it continues with full vigor to promote security cooperation.
