= Hyundai-Kia Y platforms =

Overview
- Manufacturer: Hyundai; Kia Motors
- Production: 1986–2024

Body and chassis
- Class: Mid-size car (D) / Executive car (E); Mid-size crossover SUV; Minivan (M)
- Layout: Transverse front-engine, front-wheel-drive; Transverse front-engine, all-wheel-drive

Chronology
- Successor: Hyundai-Kia N platforms (mid-size cars)

The line-up of Hyundai-Kia Y platforms is a list of platforms used by Hyundai Kia Automotive Group for its mid-size cars. It is succeeded by Hyundai-Kia N platforms.

== Hyundai Y2 ==
- Hyundai Sonata Y2 (1988–1993)
- Hyundai Grandeur L (1986–1992)
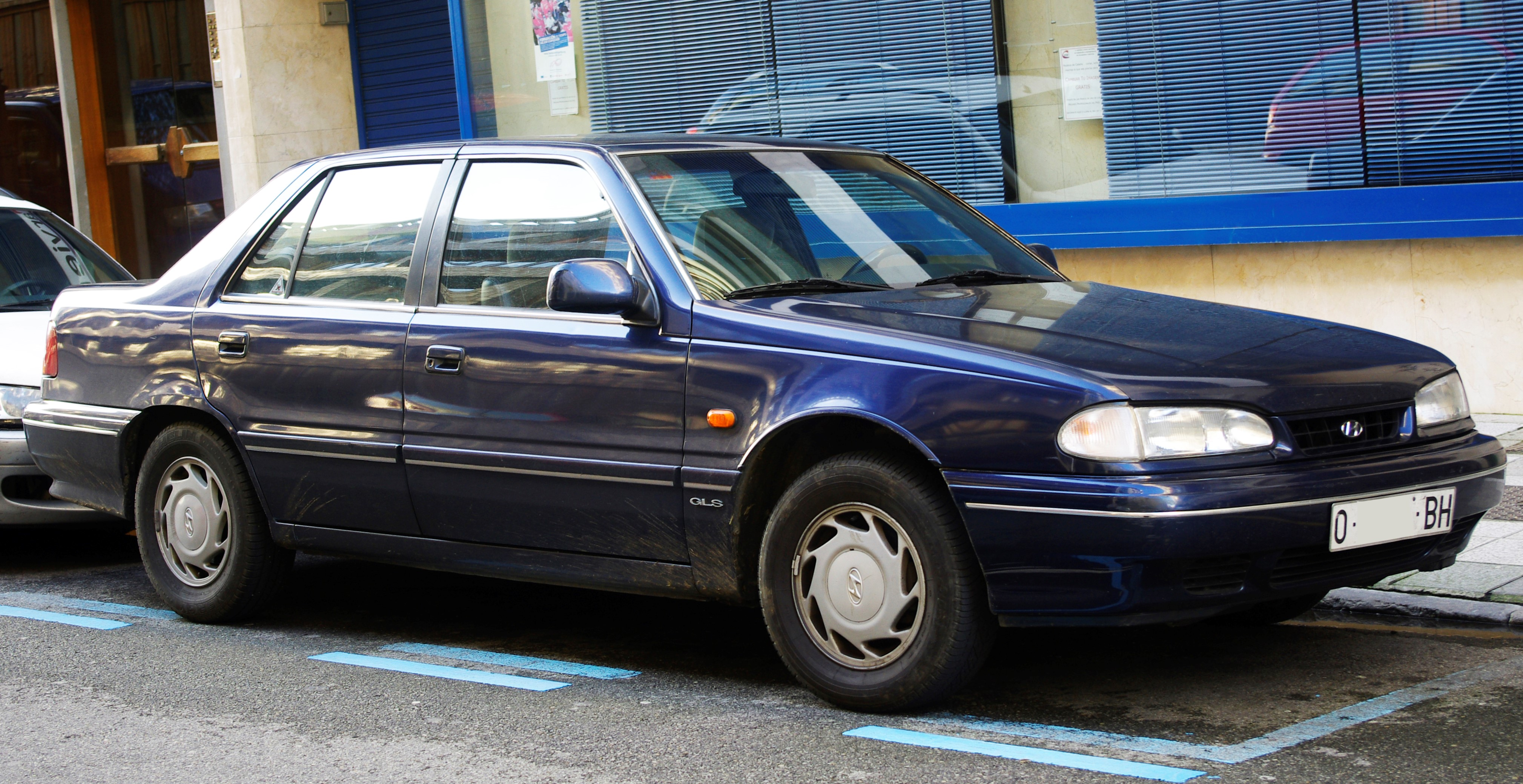
Hyundai Sonata Y2

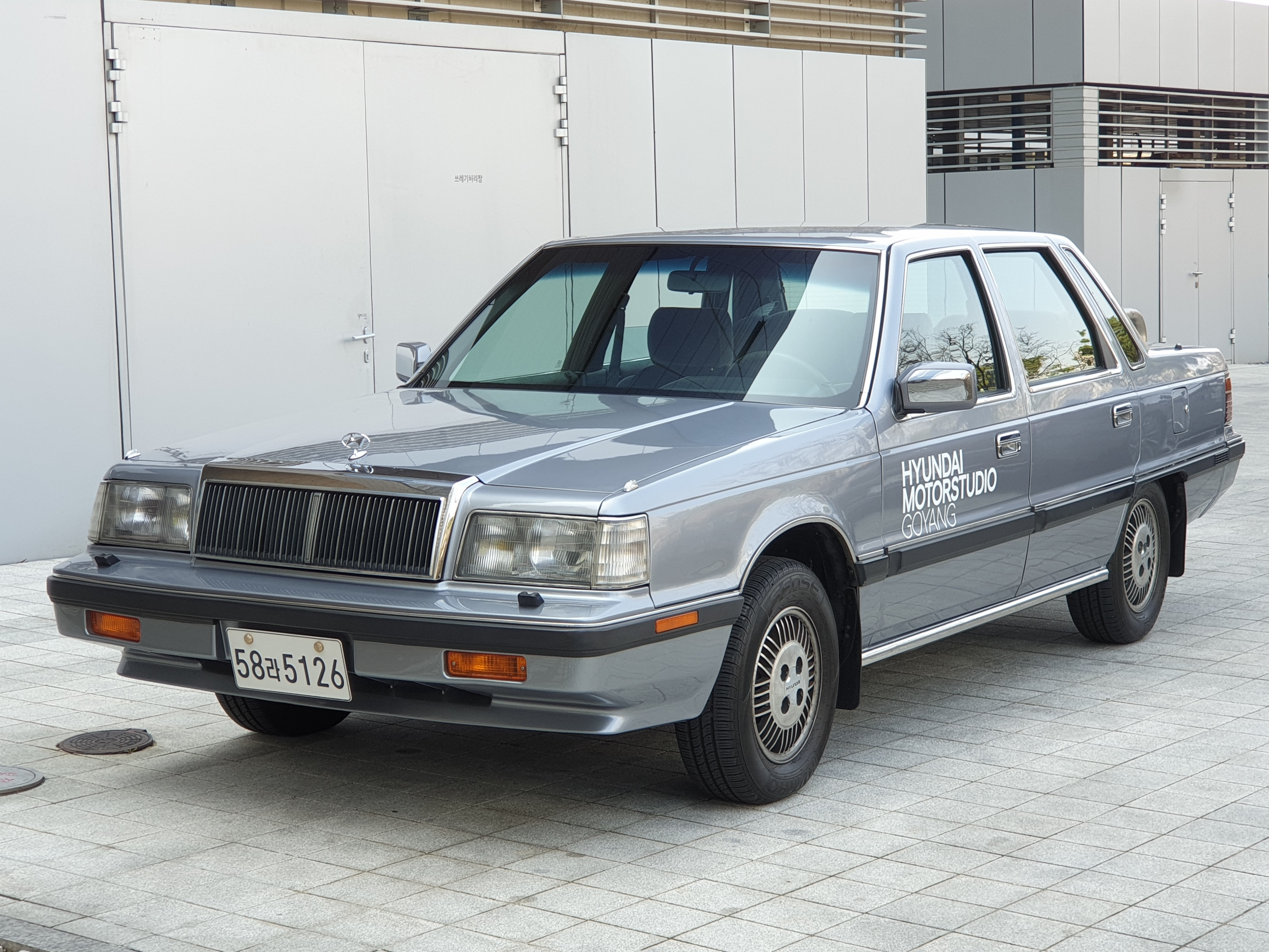
Hyundai Grandeur L

== Hyundai Y3 ==
- Hyundai Sonata/Marcia (Y3) (1993–1999)
- Hyundai Grandeur LX (1992–1998)
- Hyundai Dynasty (1997–2005)
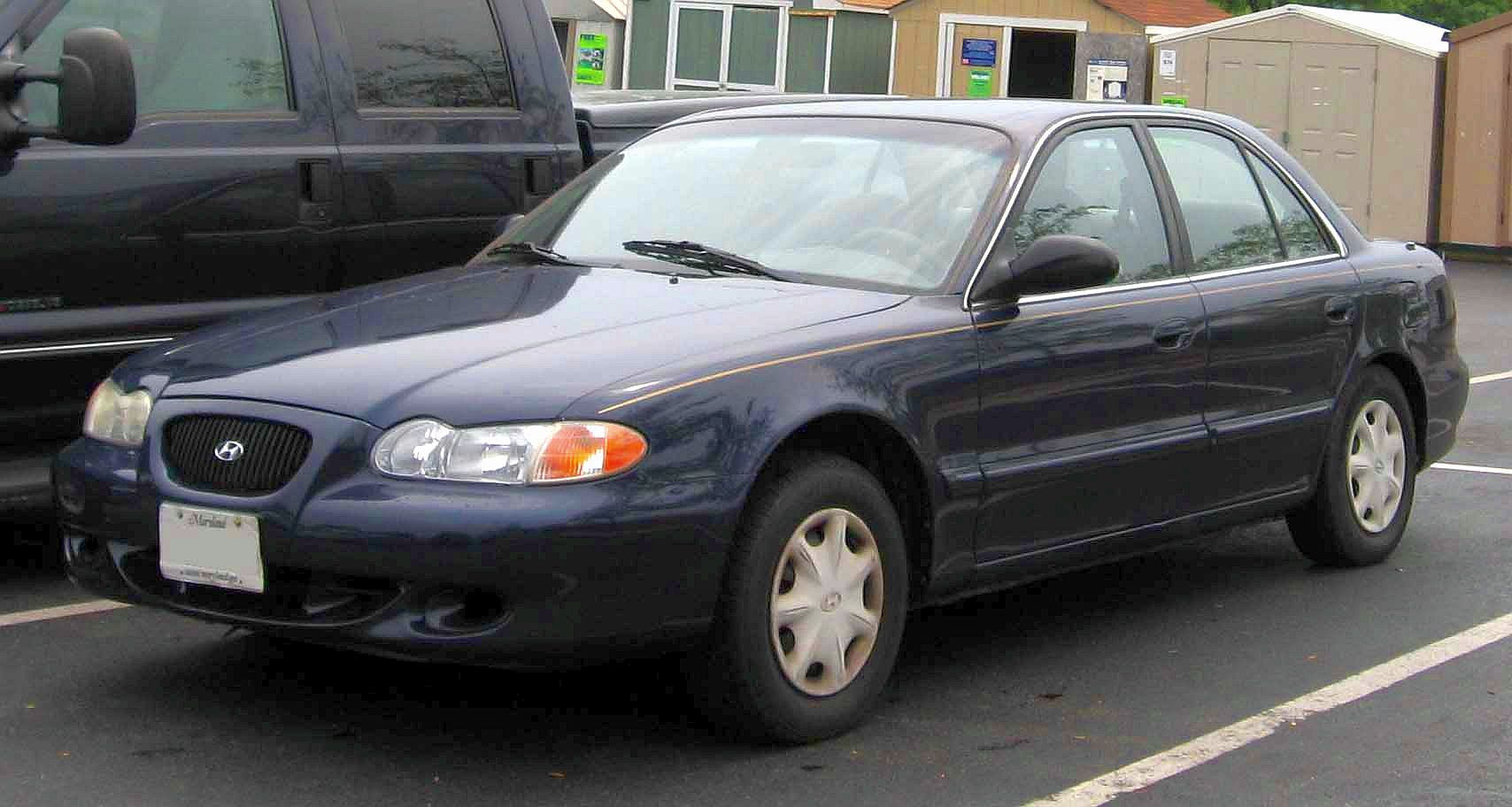
Hyundai Sonata/Marcia (Y3)

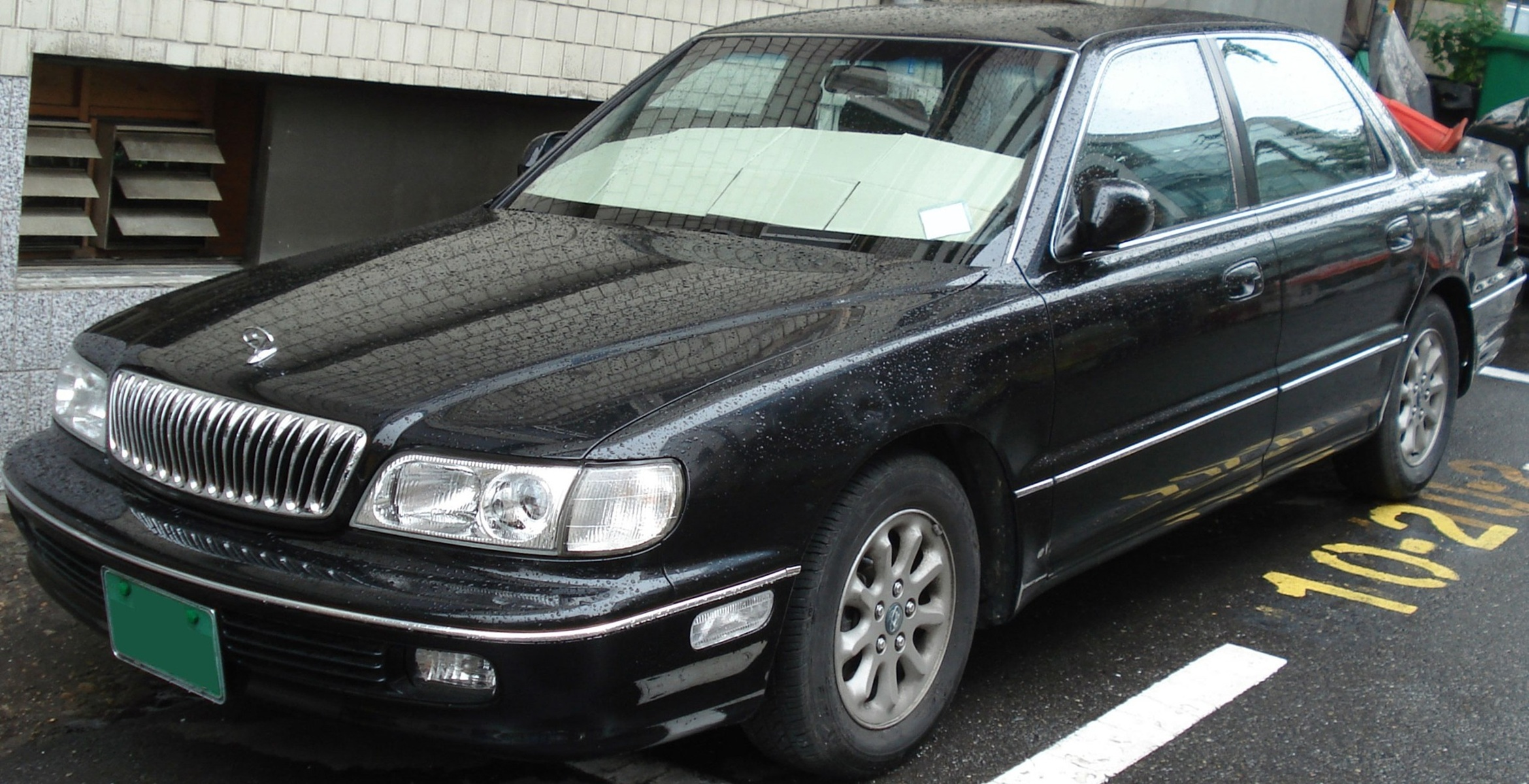
Hyundai Grandeur LX

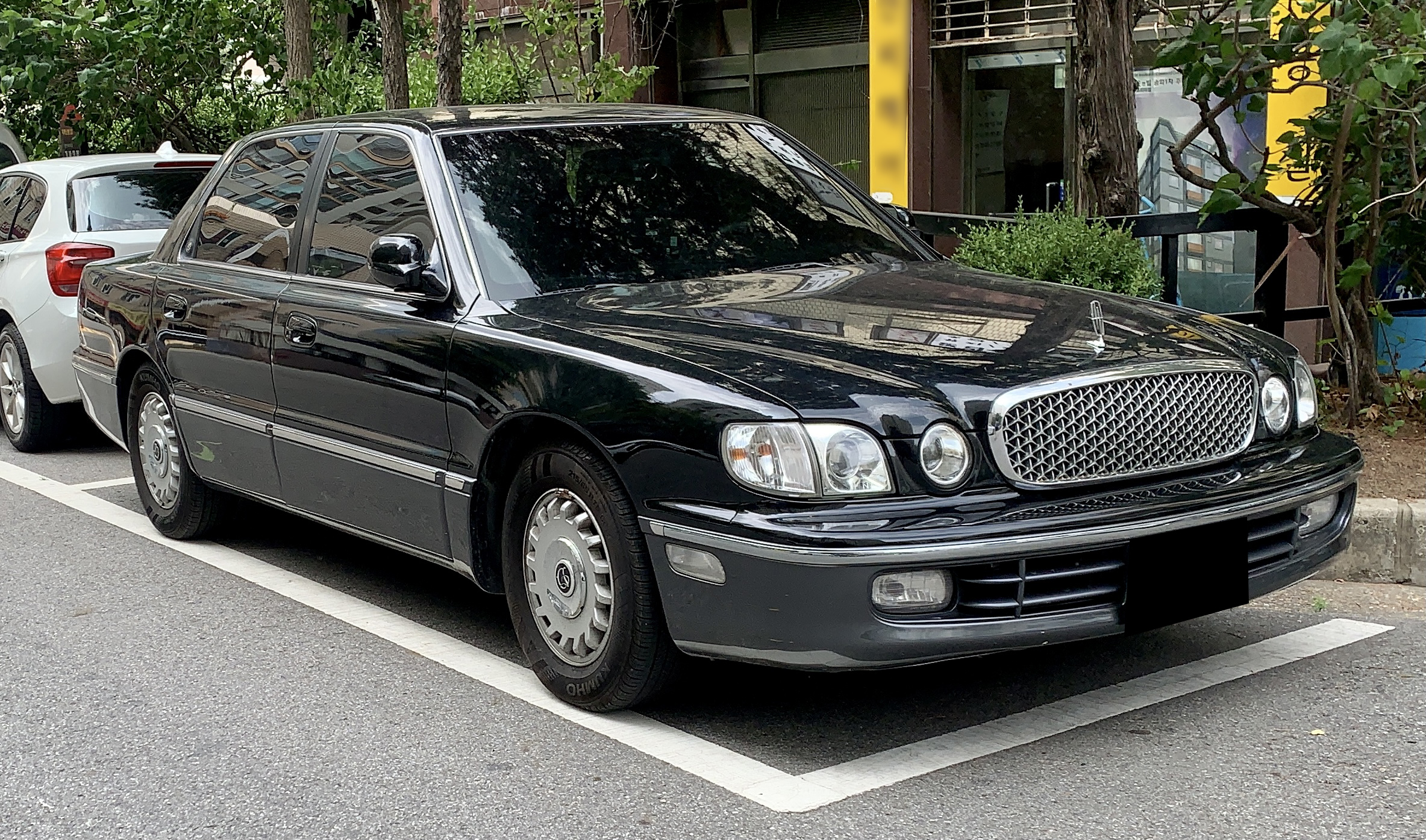
Hyundai Dynasty

== Hyundai-Kia Y4 ==
- Hyundai Sonata (EF) (1999–2005)
- Hyundai Grandeur/XG (XG) (1998–2005)
- Hyundai Santa Fe (SM) (2000–2006)
- Hyundai Trajet (FO) (1999–2008)
- Kia Optima (MS) / Magentis (2000–2005)
- Kia Opirus (2003–2010)
- Kia Carens (1999–2006)
- Hawtai Shengdafei (2006–2015)
- JAC Rein (2007–2013)
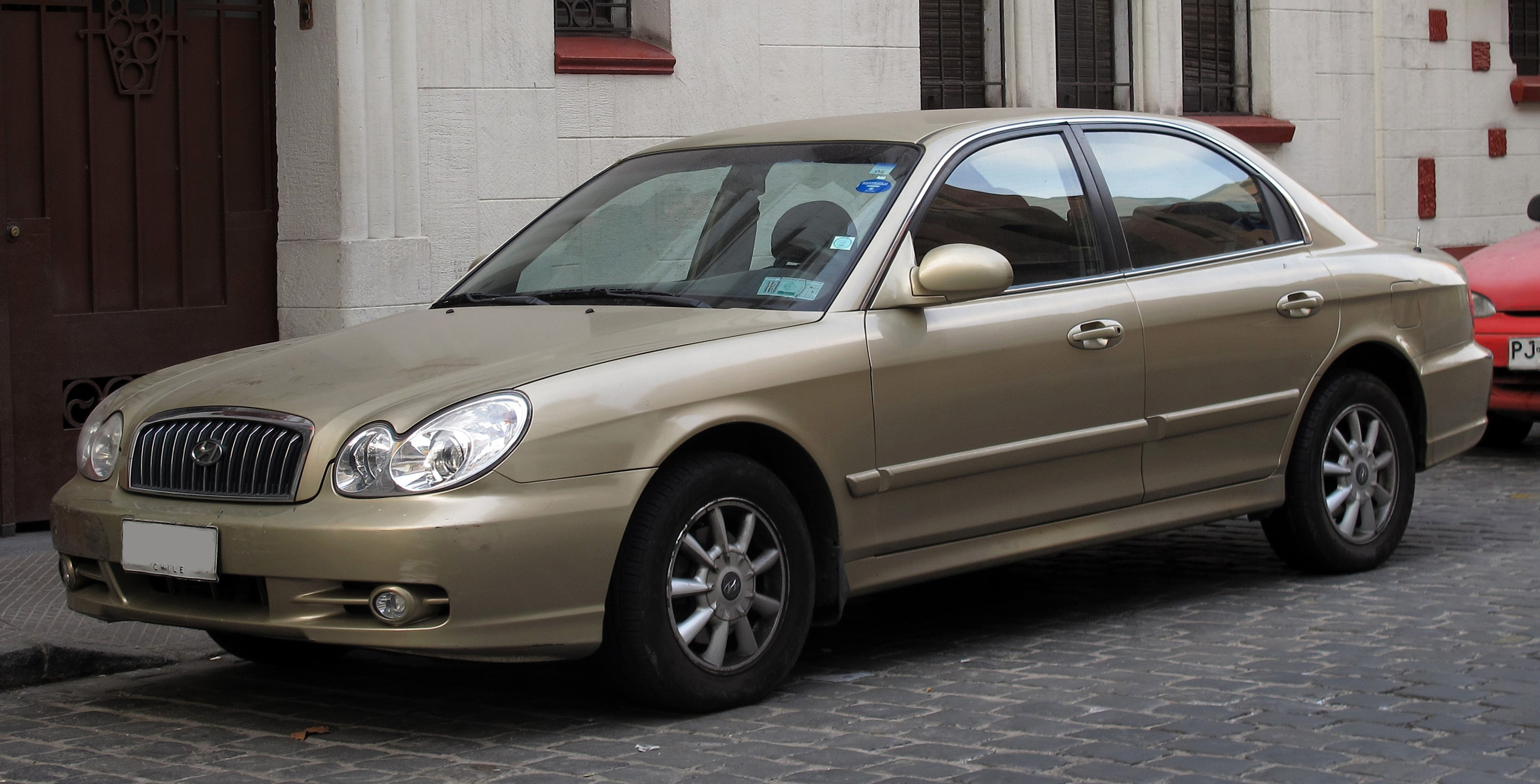
Hyundai Sonata (EF)

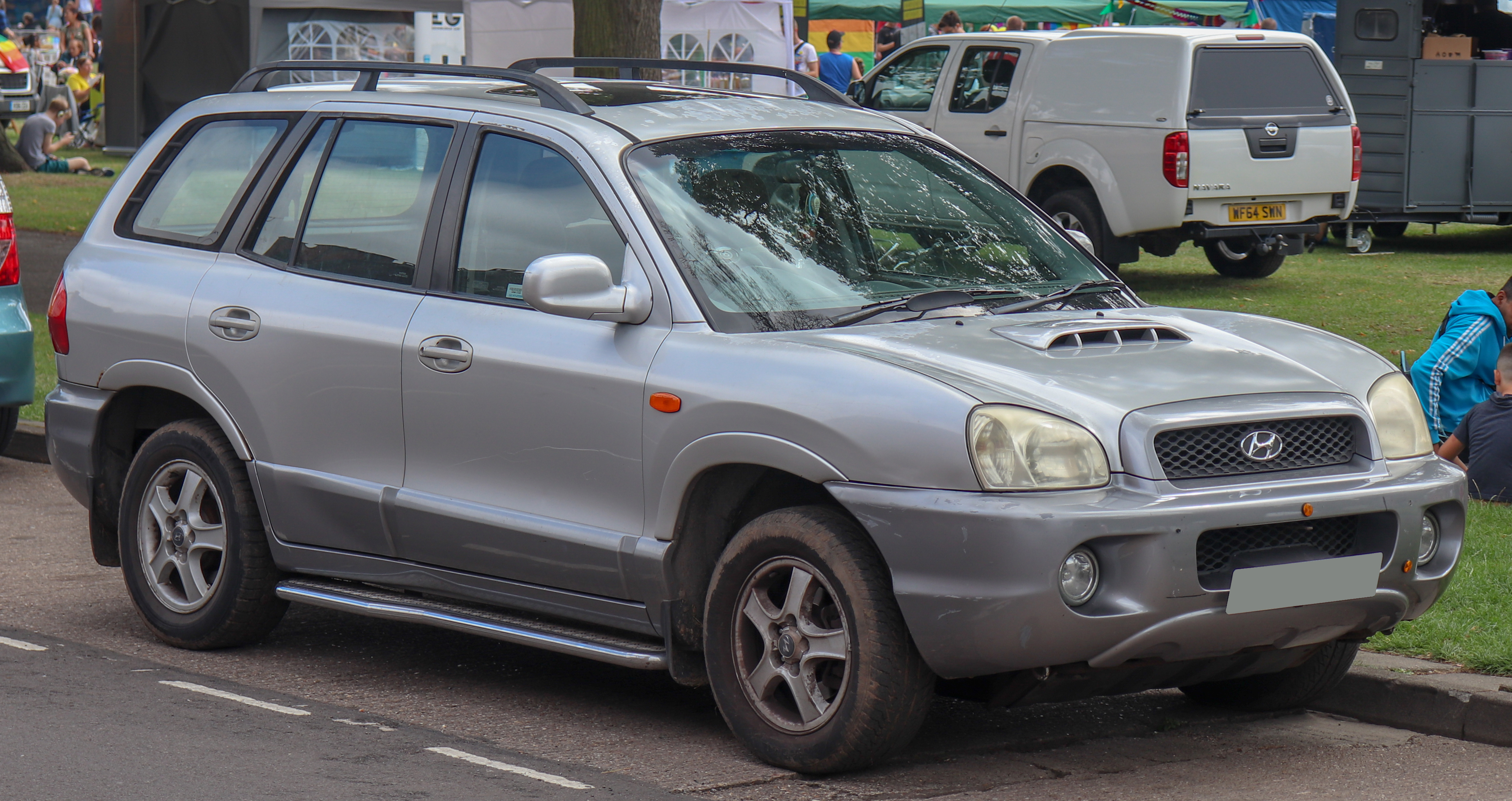
Hyundai Santa Fe (SM)

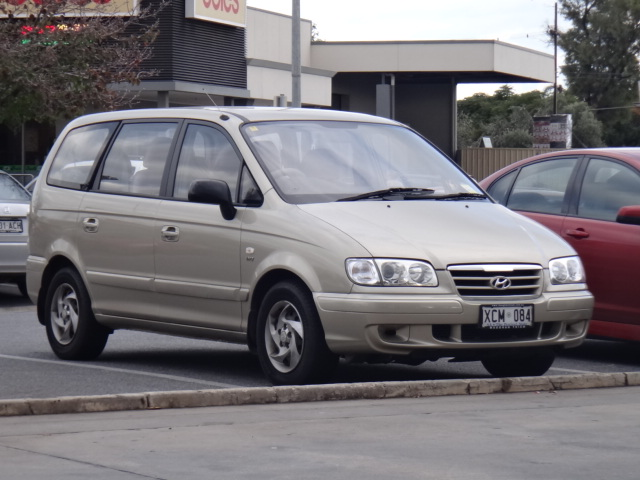
Hyundai Trajet (FO)

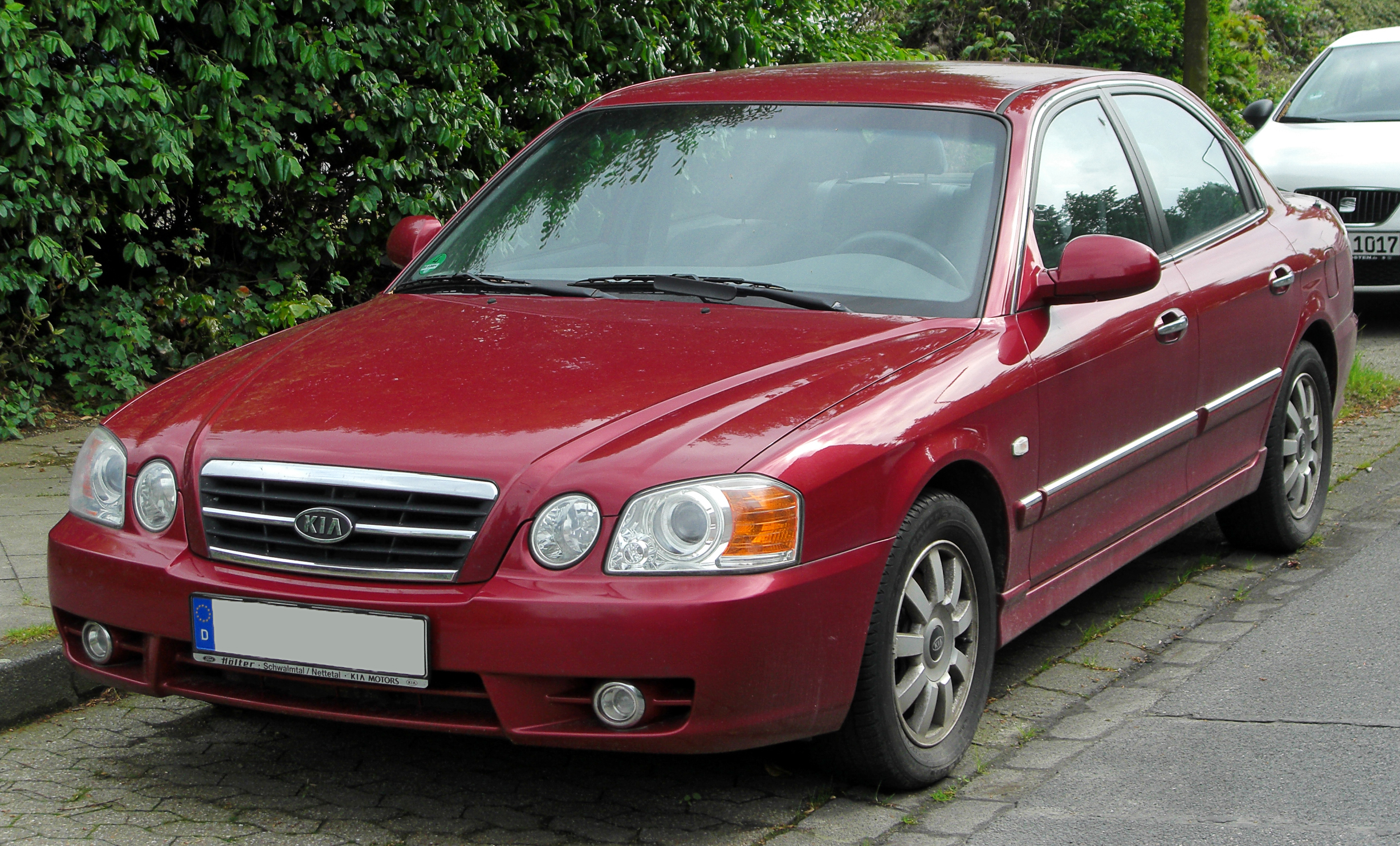
Kia Optima (MS)

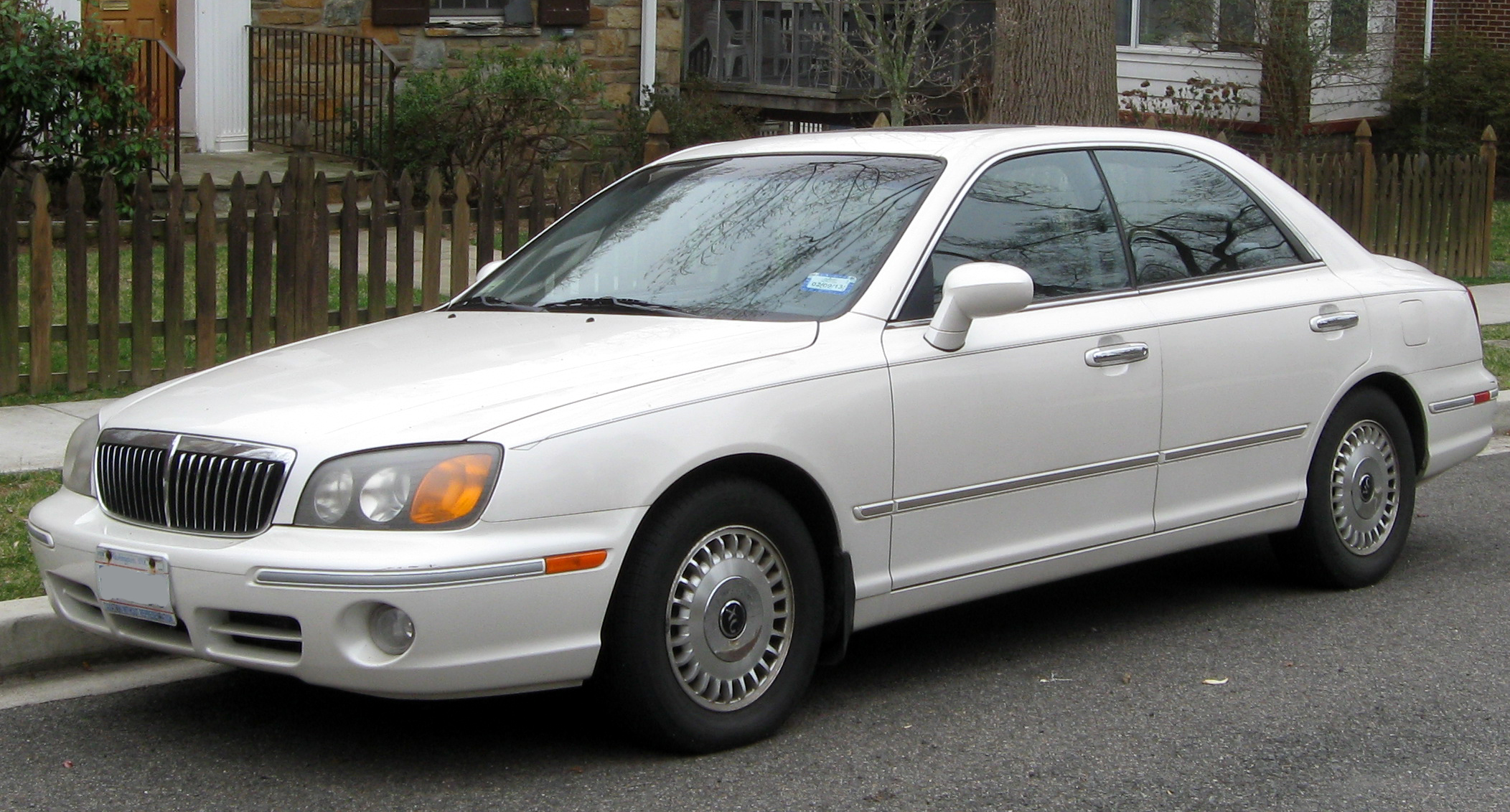
Hyundai Grandeur/XG (XG)

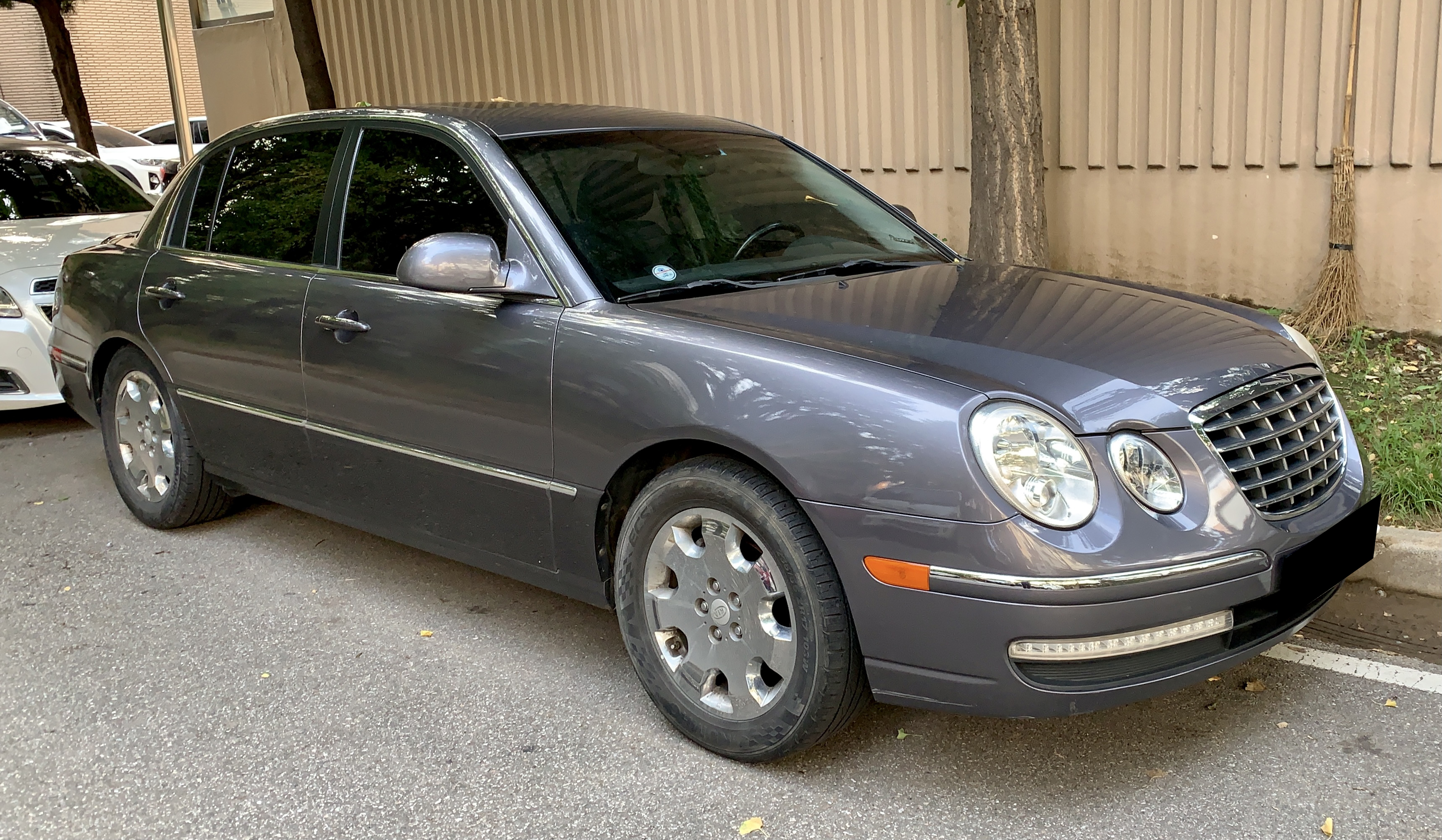
Kia Opirus

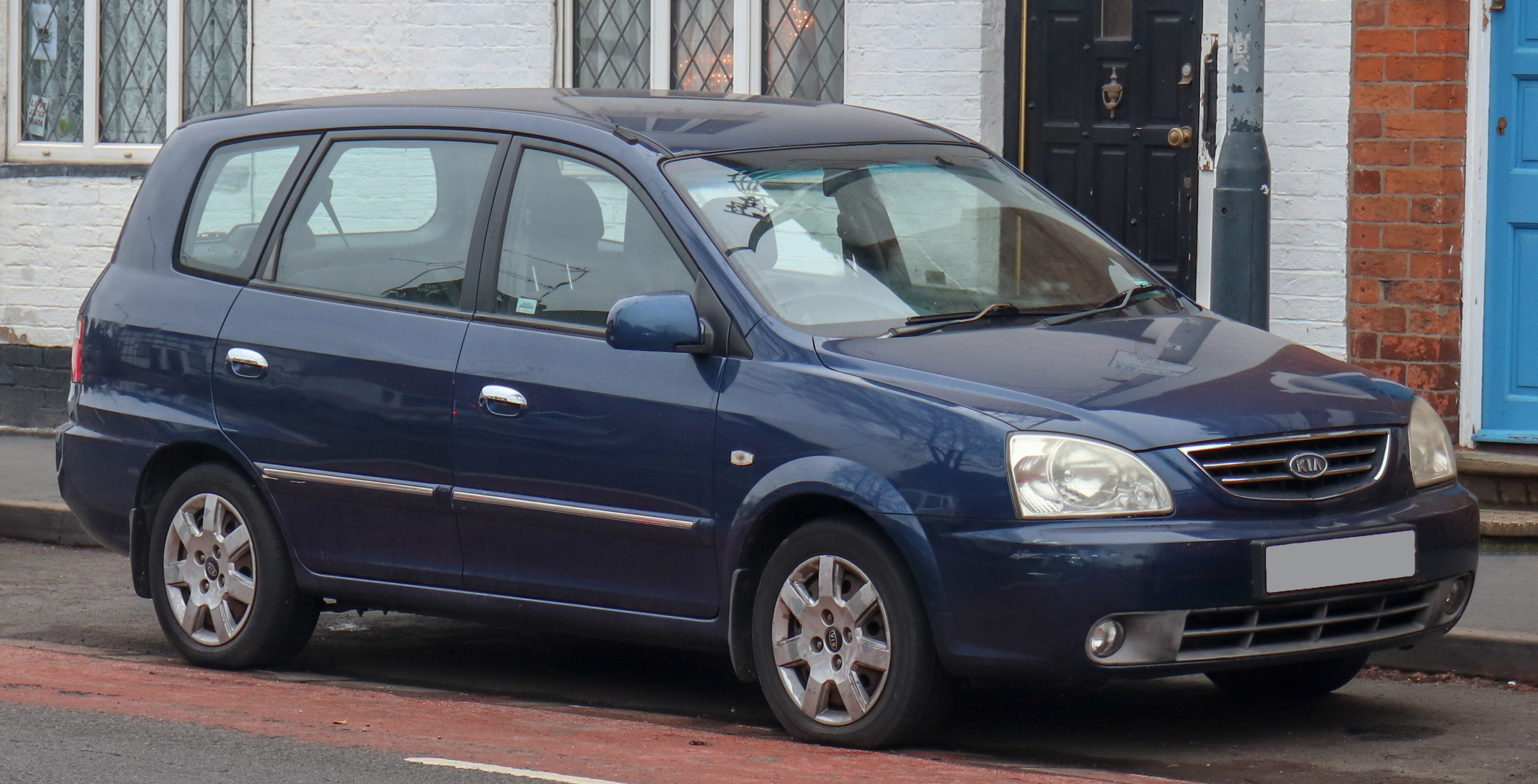
Kia Carens

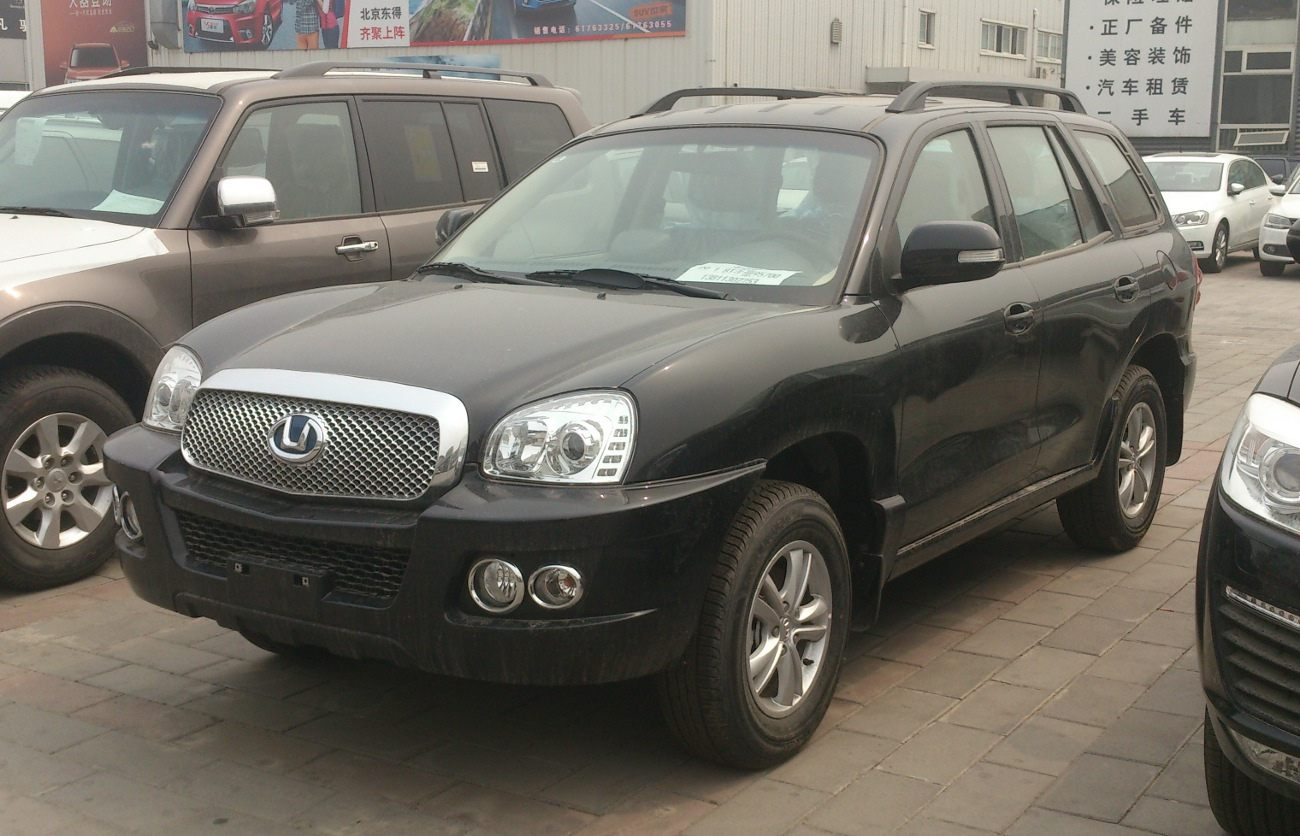
Hawtai Shengdafei

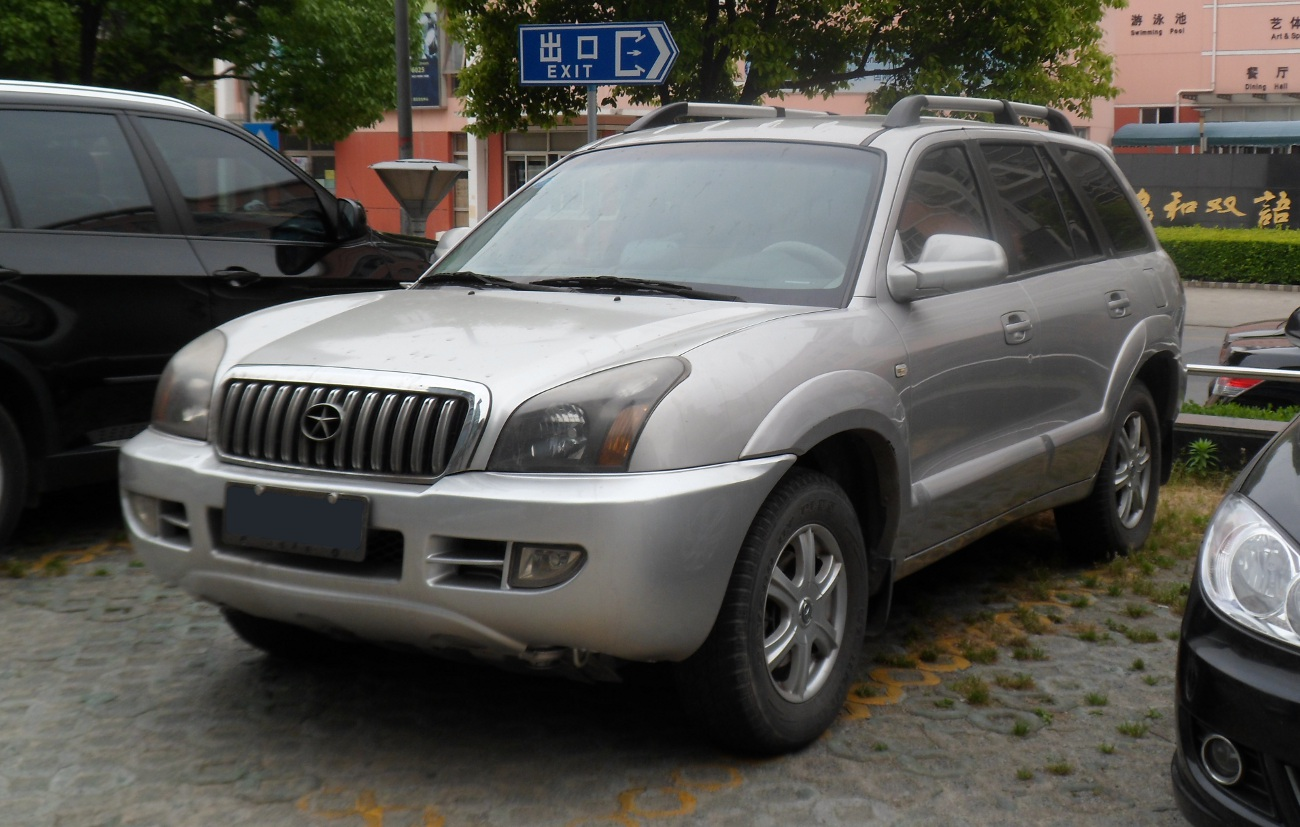
JAC Rein

== Hyundai-Kia NF/CM (Y5) ==
Sources:

- Hyundai Sonata (NF) (2004–2010)
- Hyundai Grandeur IV (TG) / Azera (2005–2011)
- Hyundai Santa Fe II (CM) (2006–2012)
- Hyundai Veracruz / ix55 (EN) (2006–2015)
- Kia Optima II (MG) / Magentis / Lotze (2005–2010)
- Kia Sorento II (XM) (2009–2012)
- Kia Carnival II (VQ) / Sedona (2006–2014)
- Kia Carens II (UN) / Rondo (2006–2012, hybrid between J2/J3 and NF/CM platforms)
- Hyundai i40 (VF) (2011-2019)
- Hyundai Mistra (CF) (2013–2020, hybrid between J5 and NF/CM platforms)
- Hyundai Sonata/i45 (YF) (2009–2014)
- Hyundai Aslan (AG) (2014–2017)
- Hyundai Grandeur/Azera (HG) (2011–2017)
- Hyundai Santa Fe/Santa Fe Sport (DM) (2012–2018)
- Hyundai Maxcruz/Santa Fe/Grand Santa Fe/Santa Fe XL (NC) (2012–2019)
- Kia Optima/K5 (TF) (2011–2015)
- Kia K4 (PF) (2014-2020)
- Kia K7/Cadenza (VG) (2009–2016)
- Kia Carnival/Sedona (YP) (2014–2020)
- Kia Carens (RP) (2013–2020)
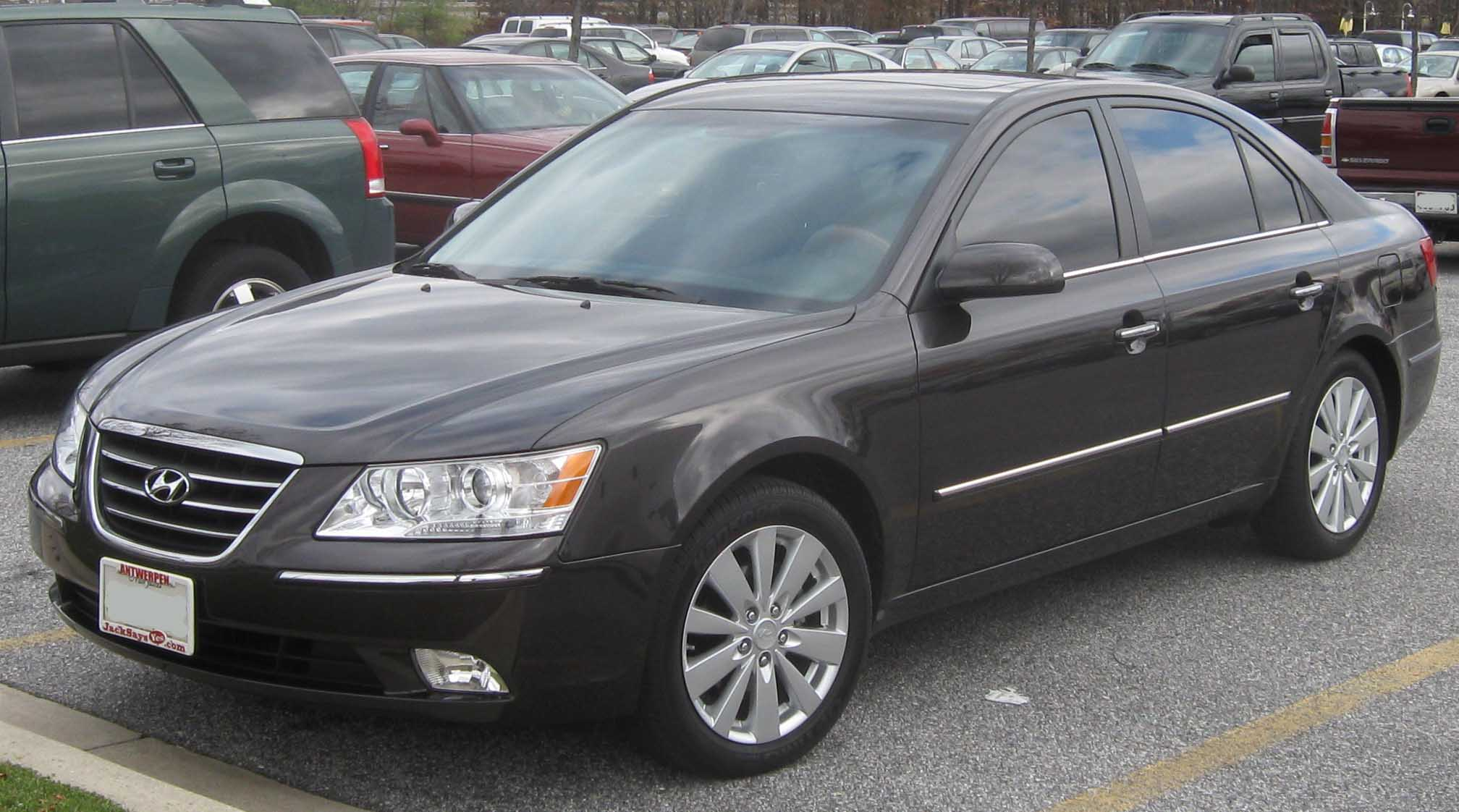
Hyundai Sonata (NF)

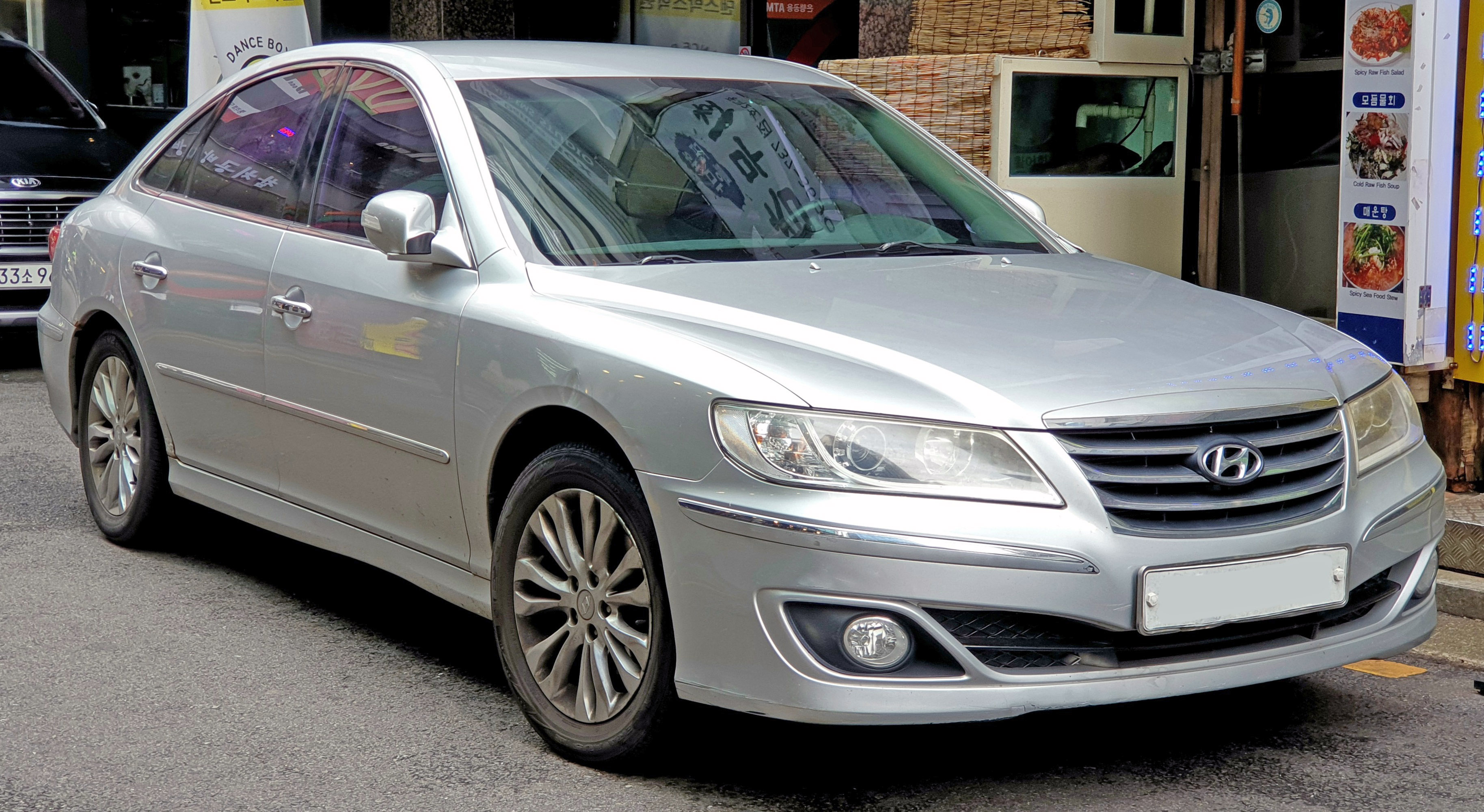
Hyundai Grandeur IV (TG)

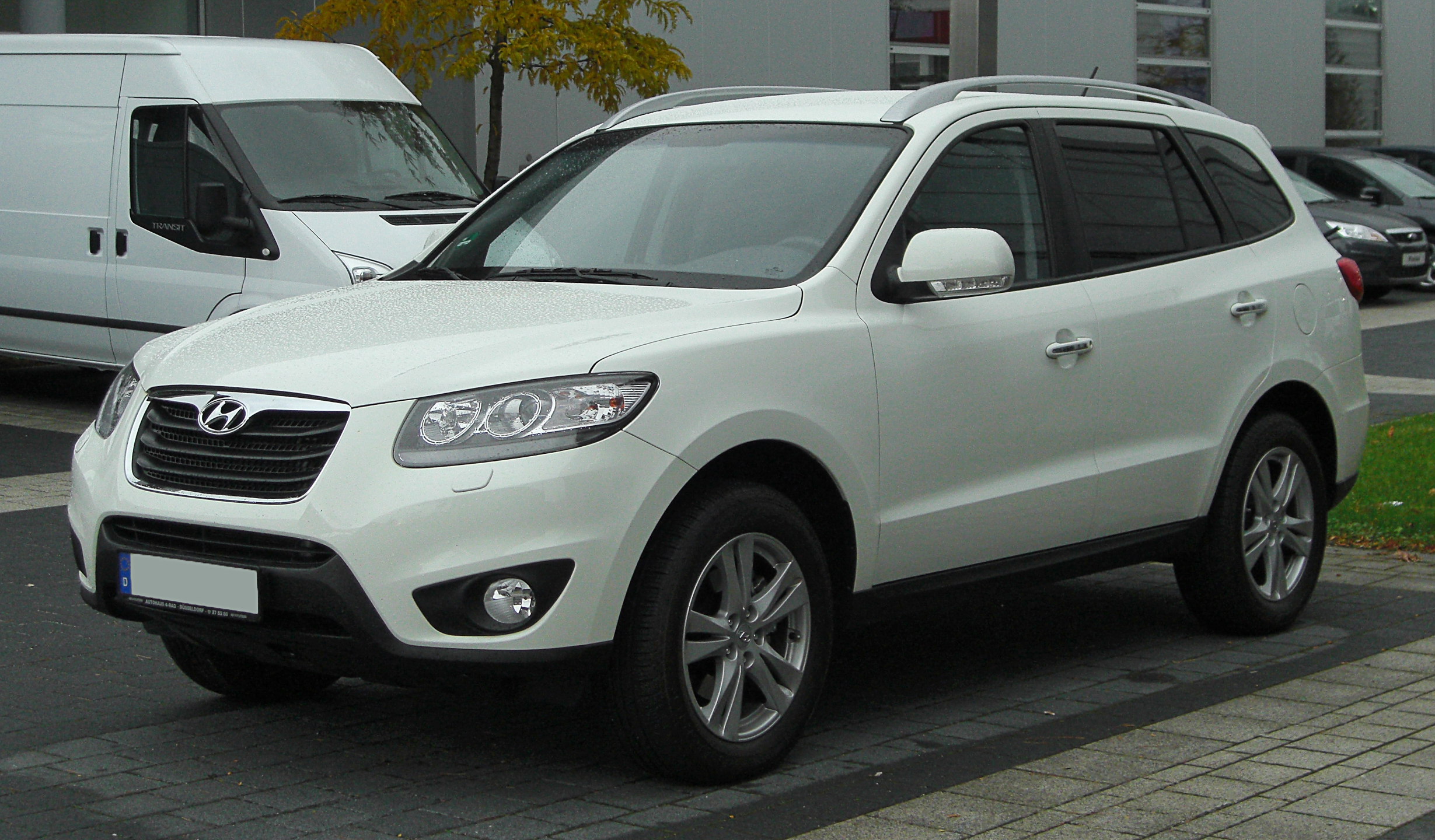
Hyundai Santa Fe II (CM)

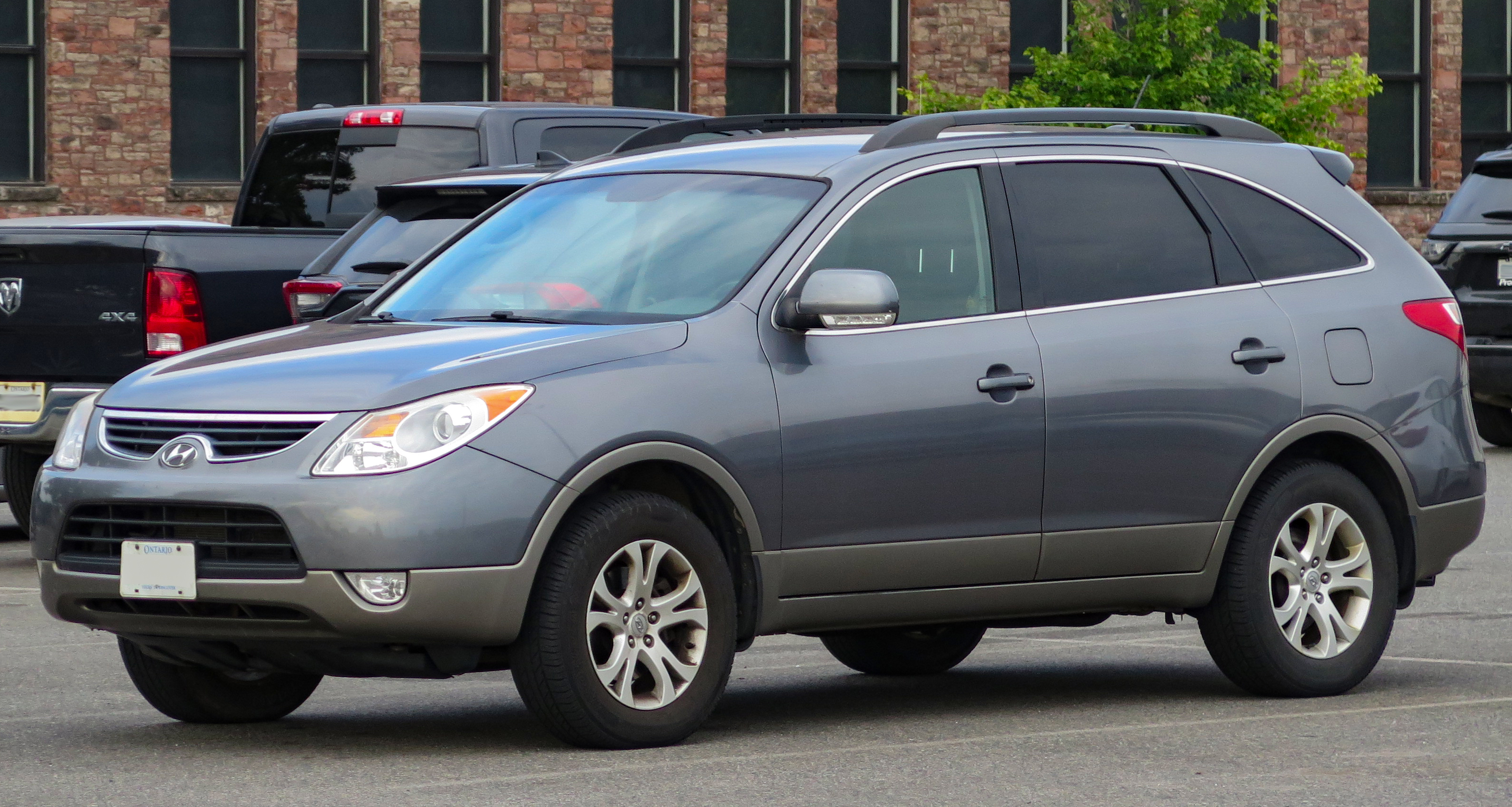
Hyundai Veracruz

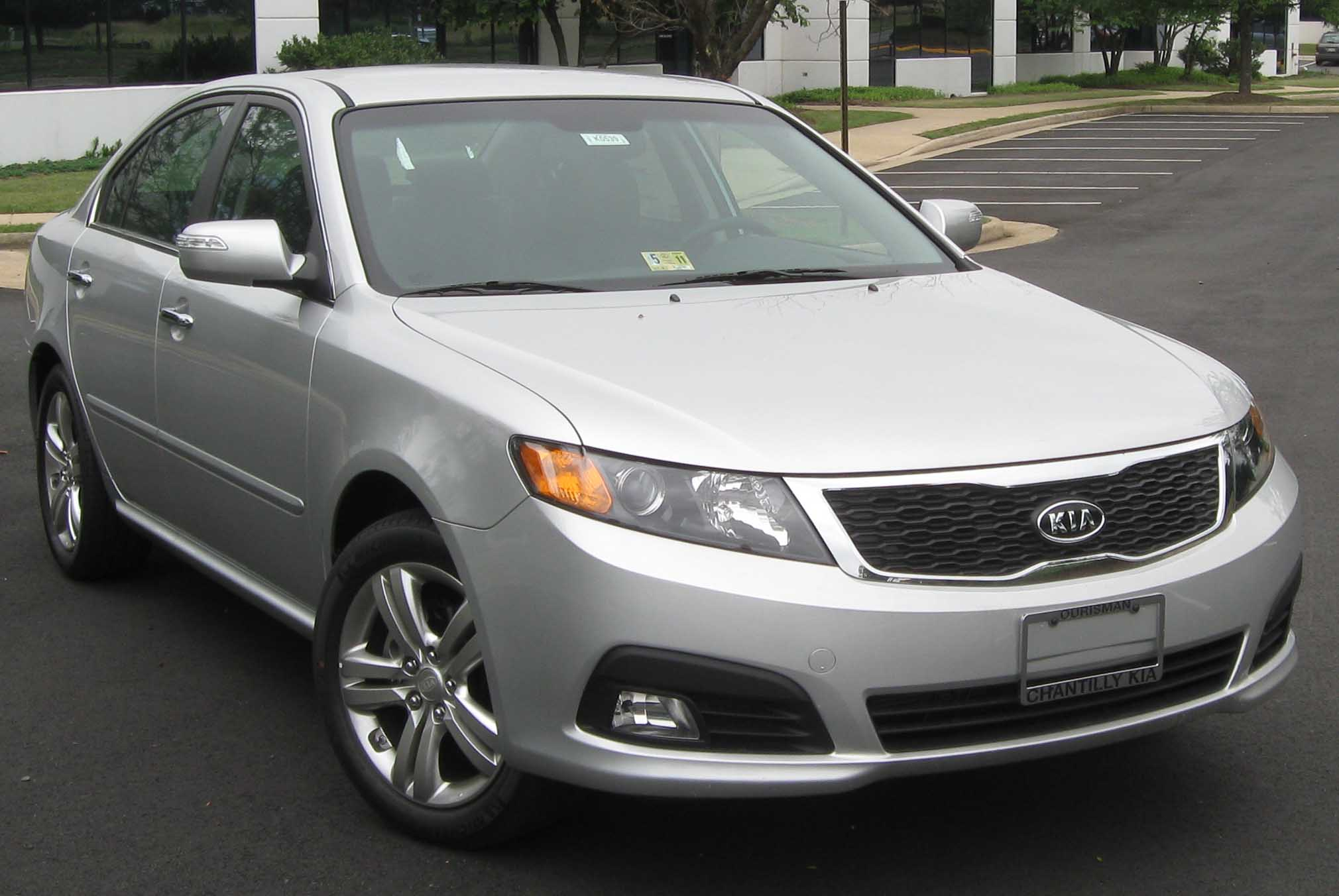
Kia Optima II (MG)

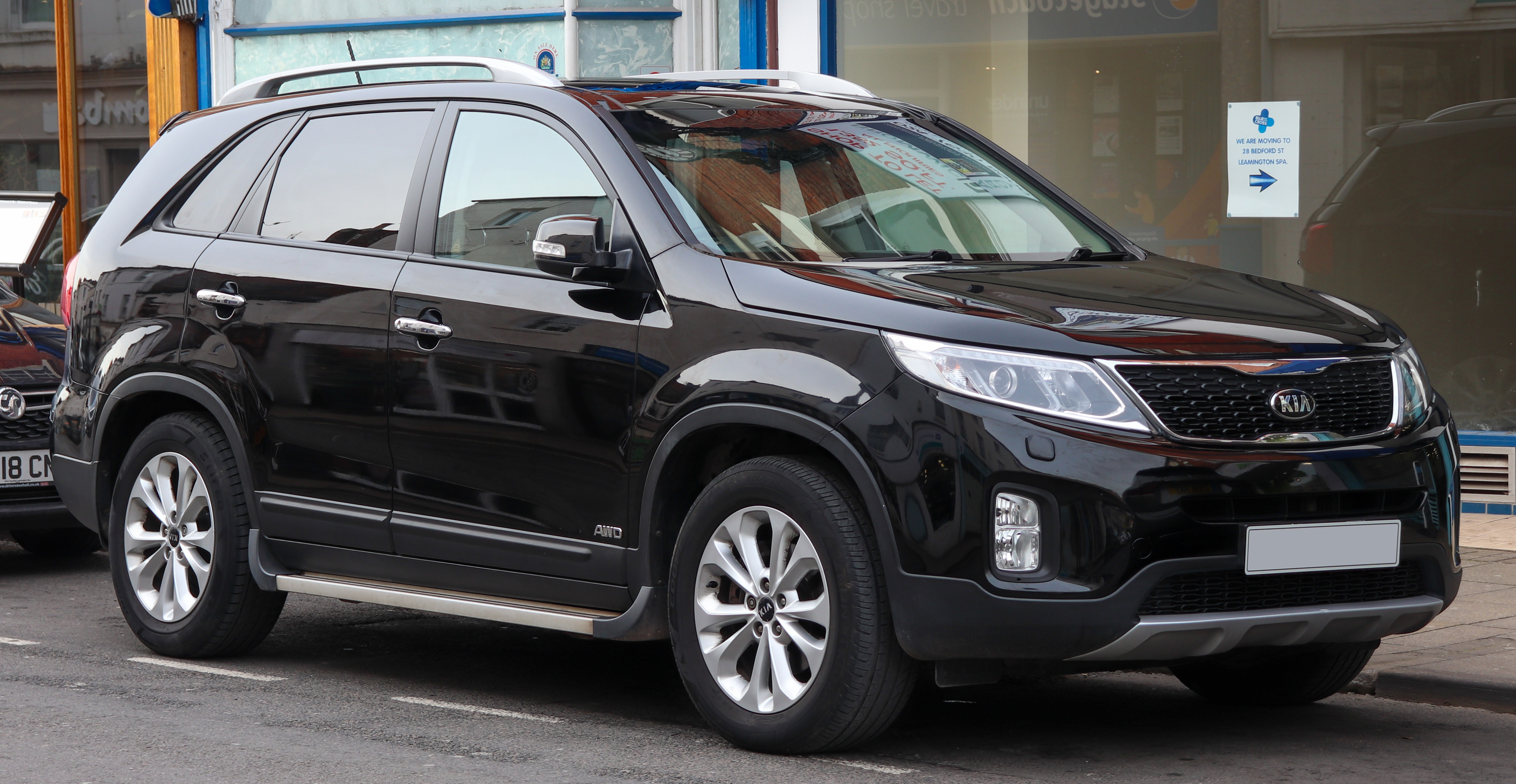
Kia Sorento II (XM)

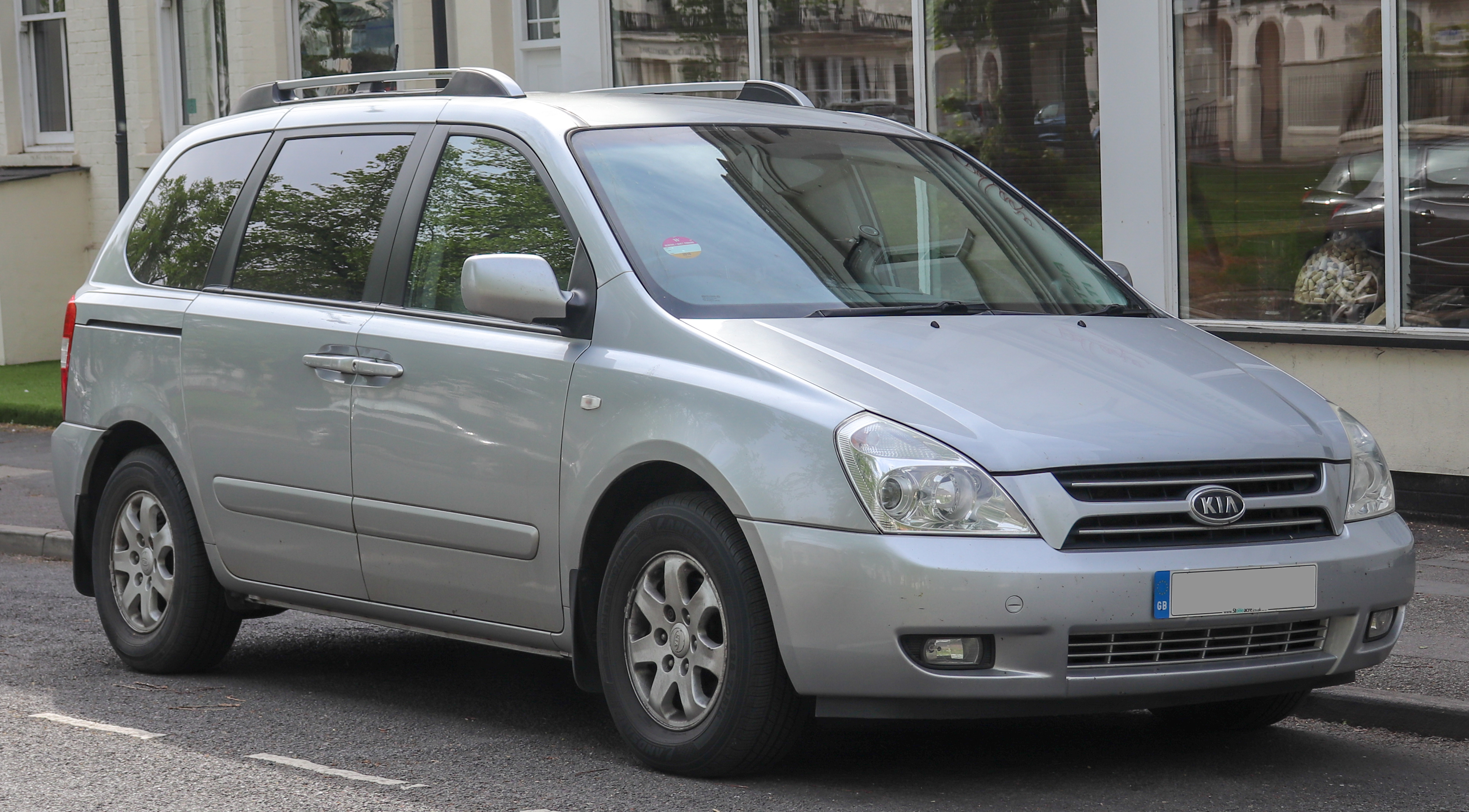
Kia Carnival II (VQ)

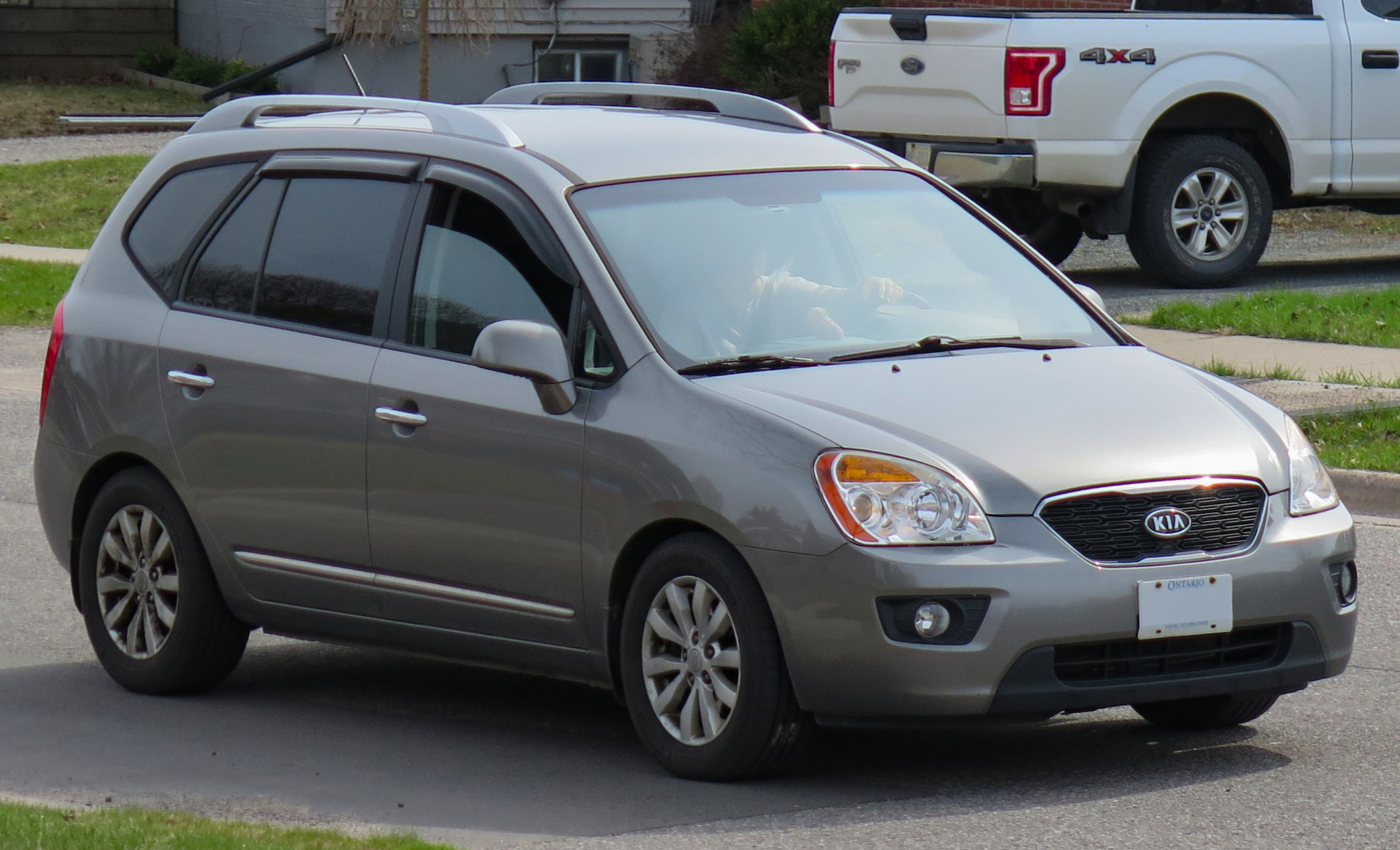
Kia Carens II (UN)

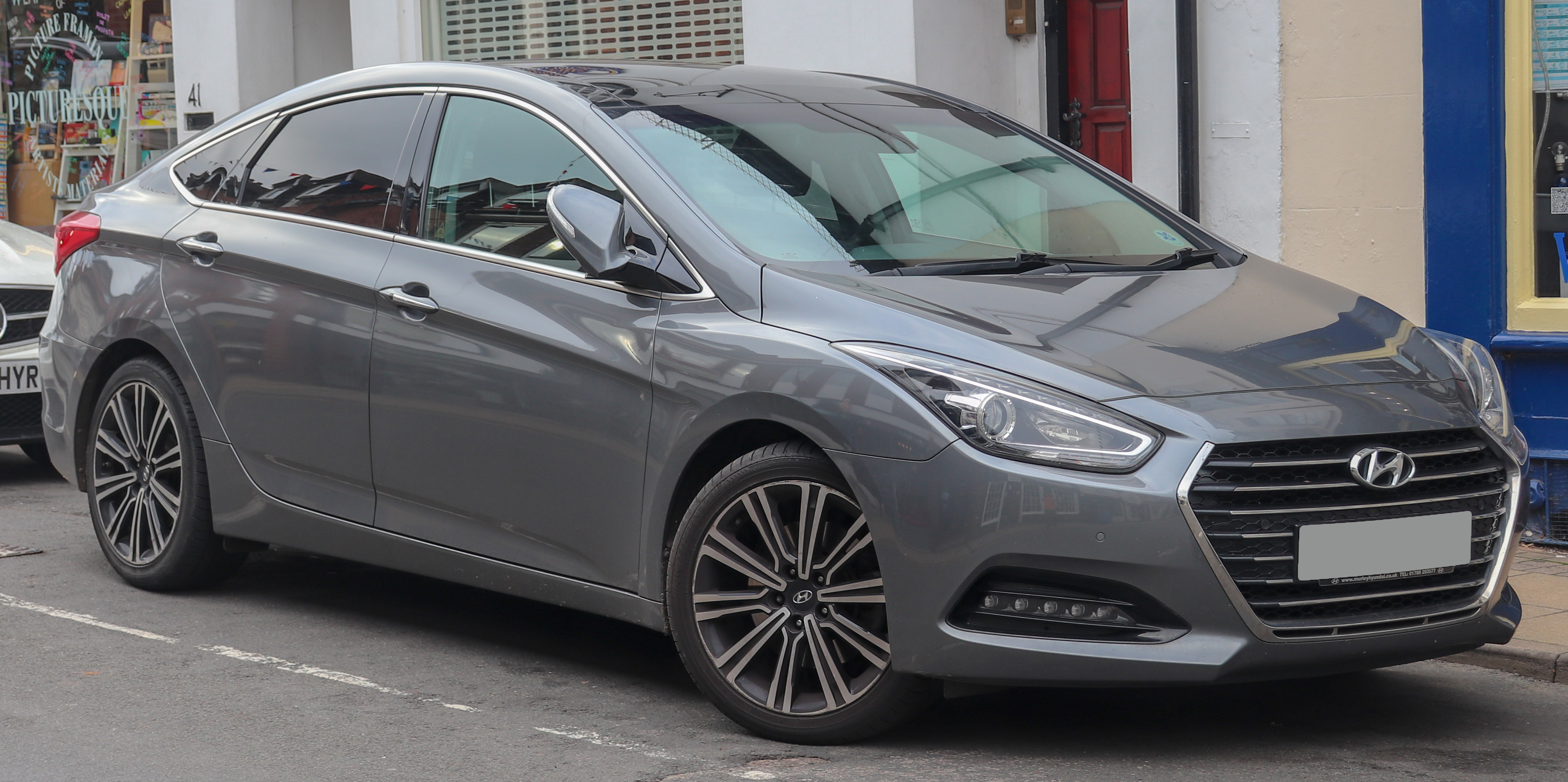
Hyundai i40 (VF)

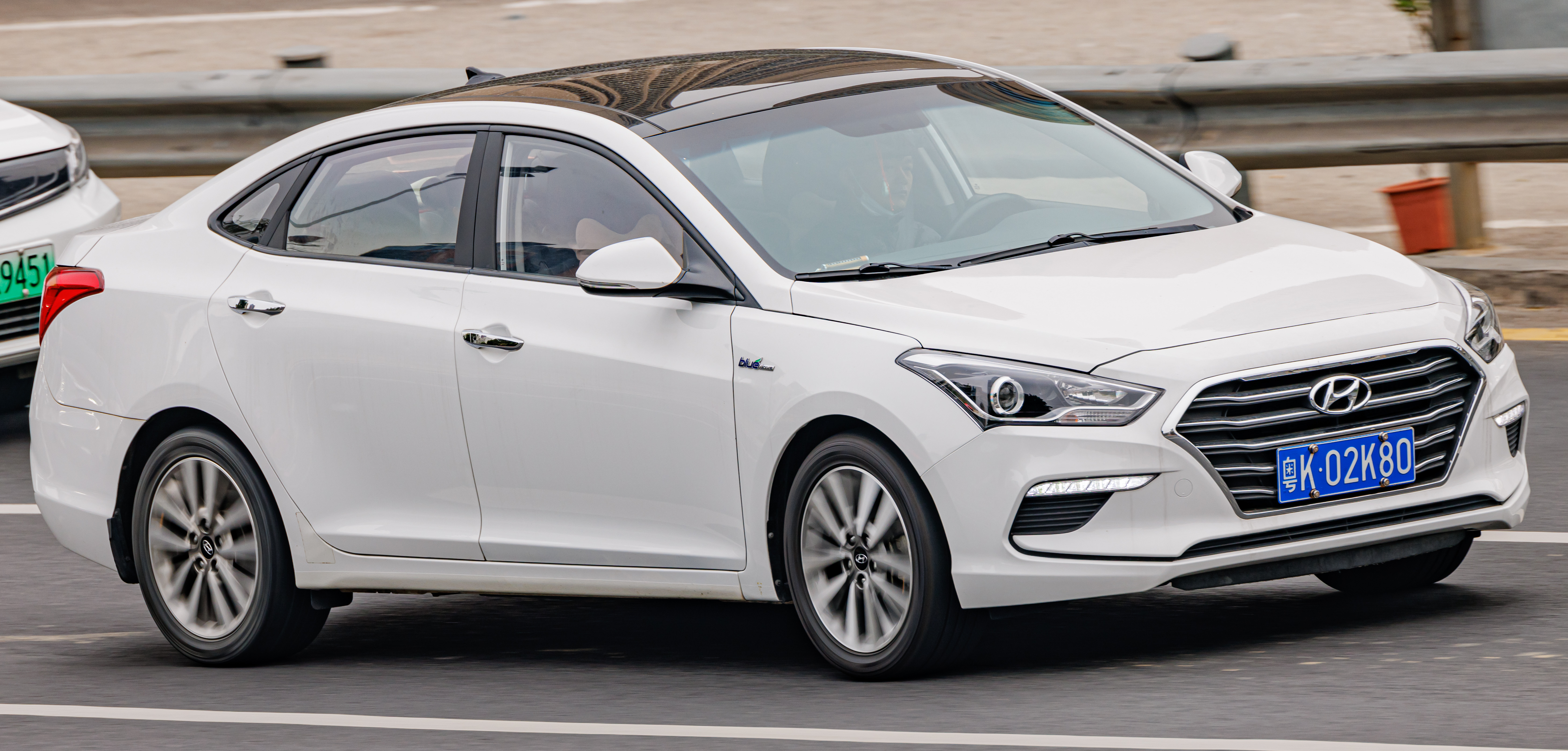
Hyundai Mistra (CF)

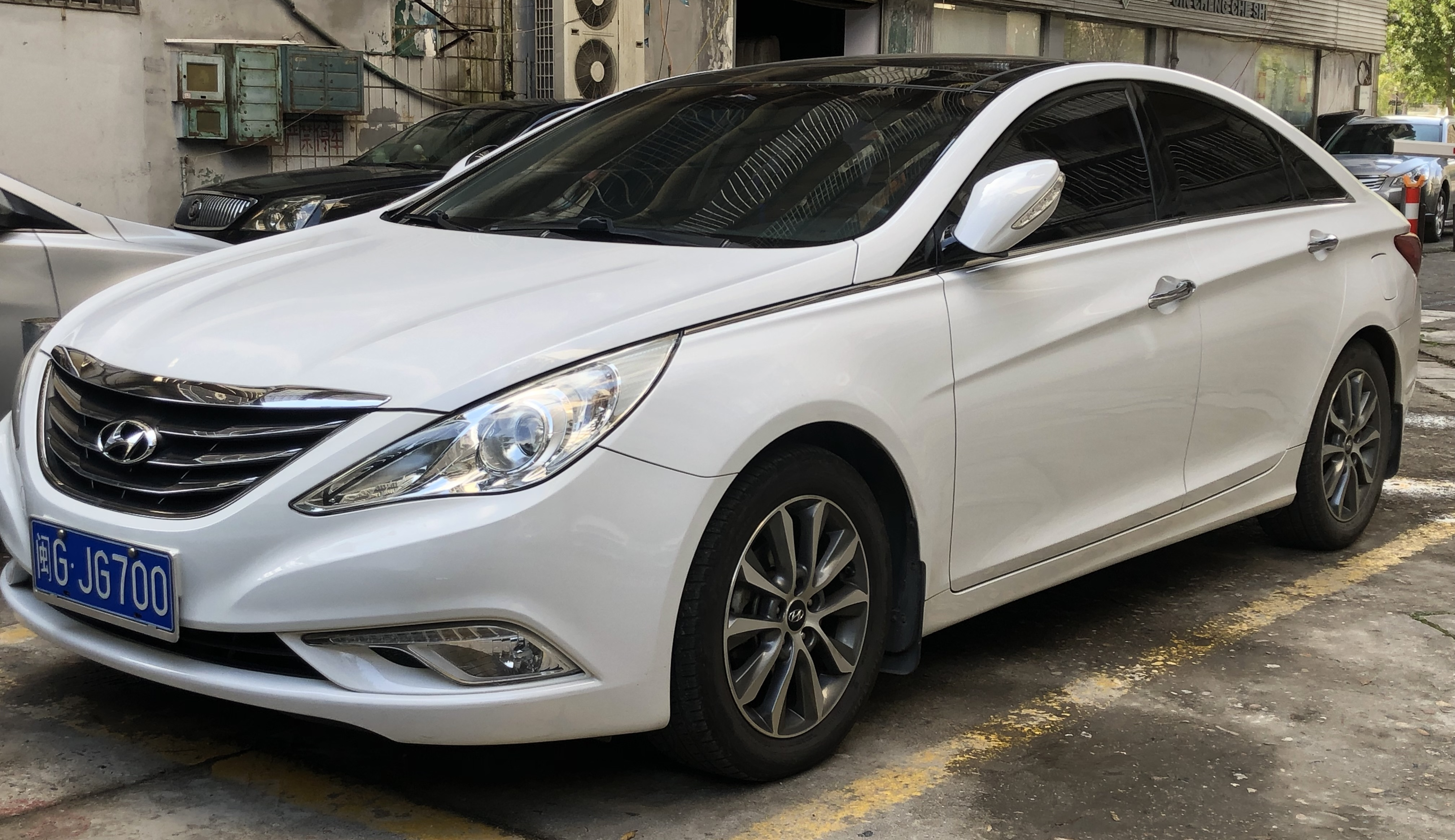
Hyundai Sonata/i45 (YF)

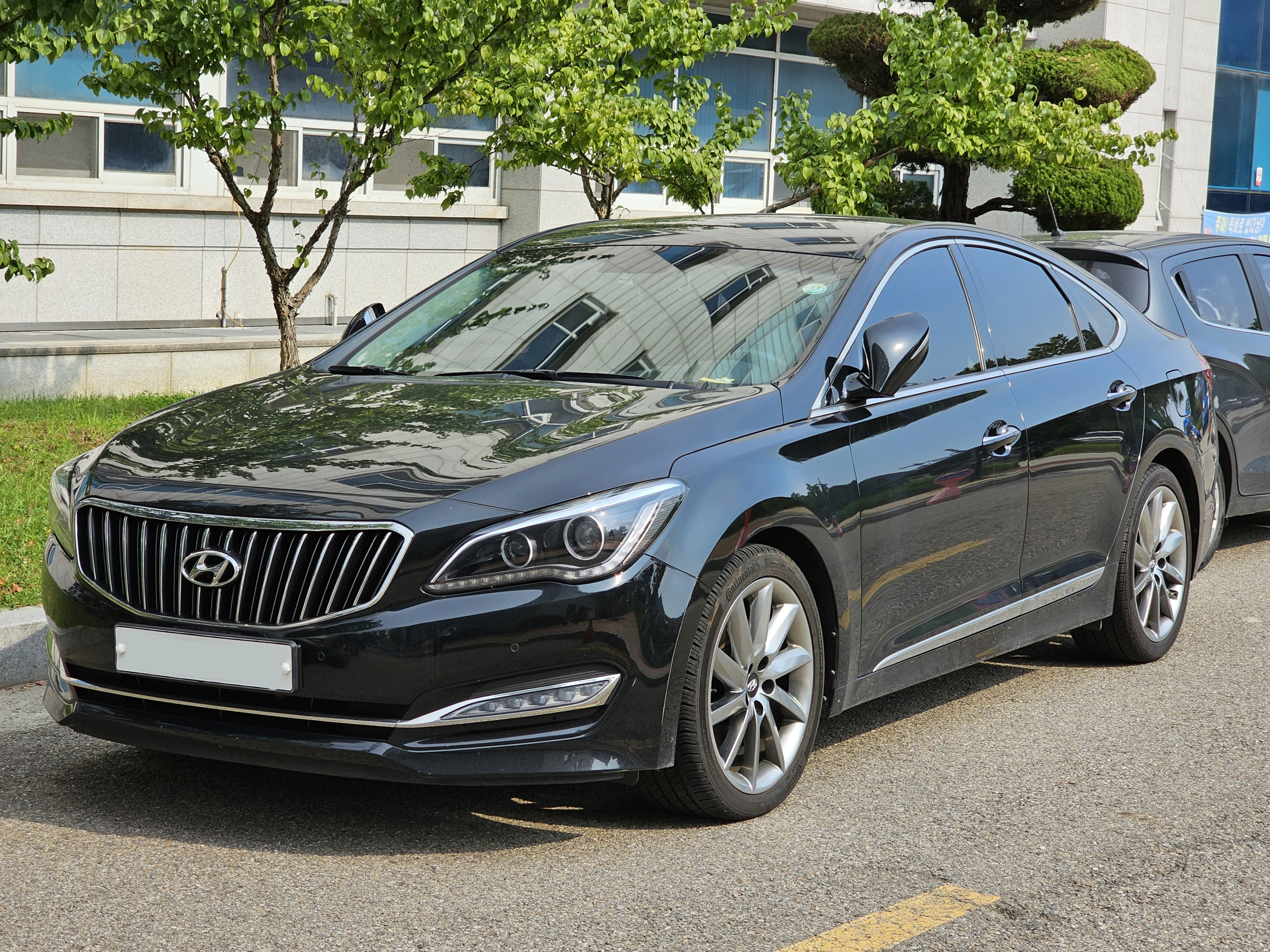
Hyundai Aslan (AG)

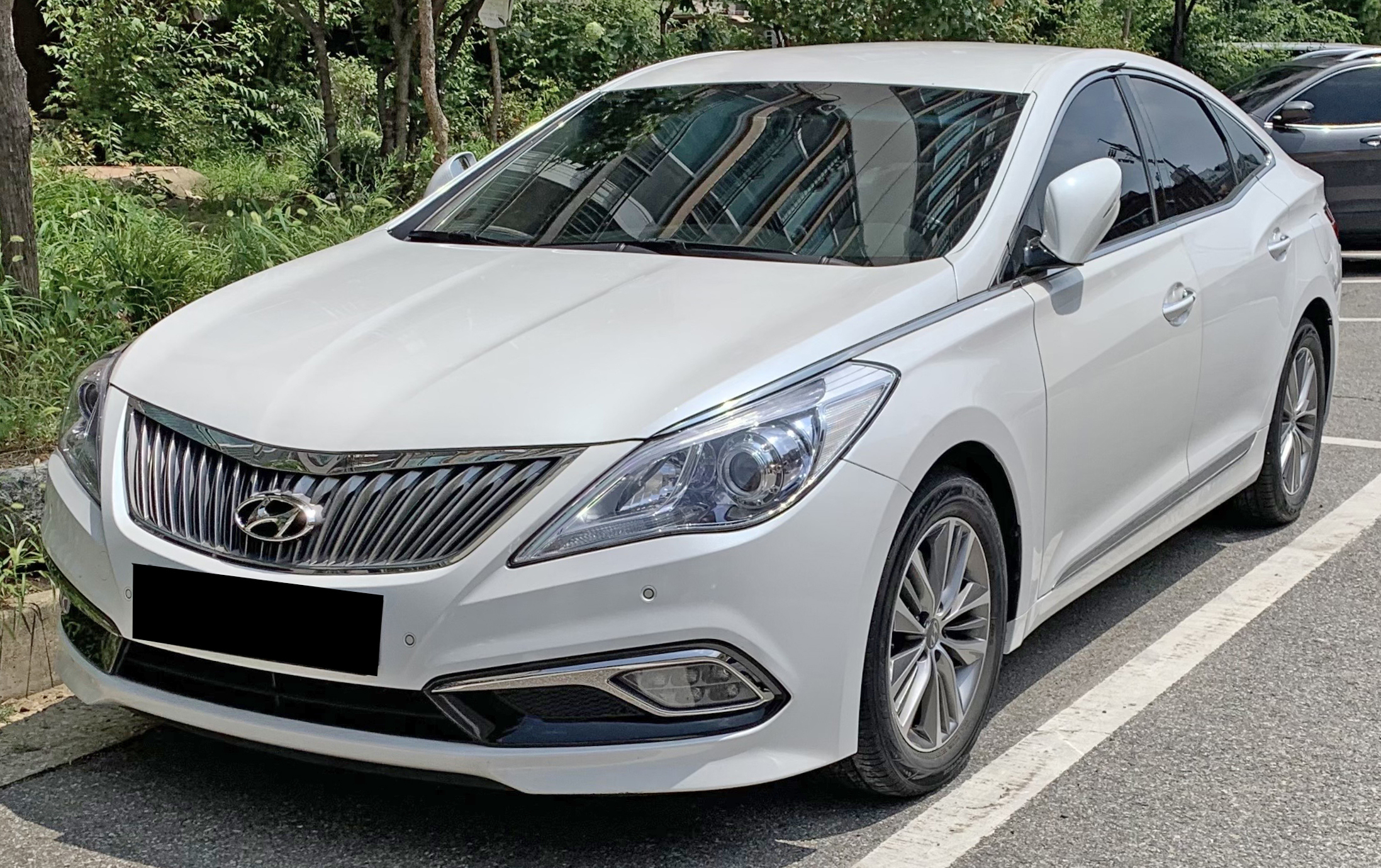
Hyundai Grandeur/Azera (HG)

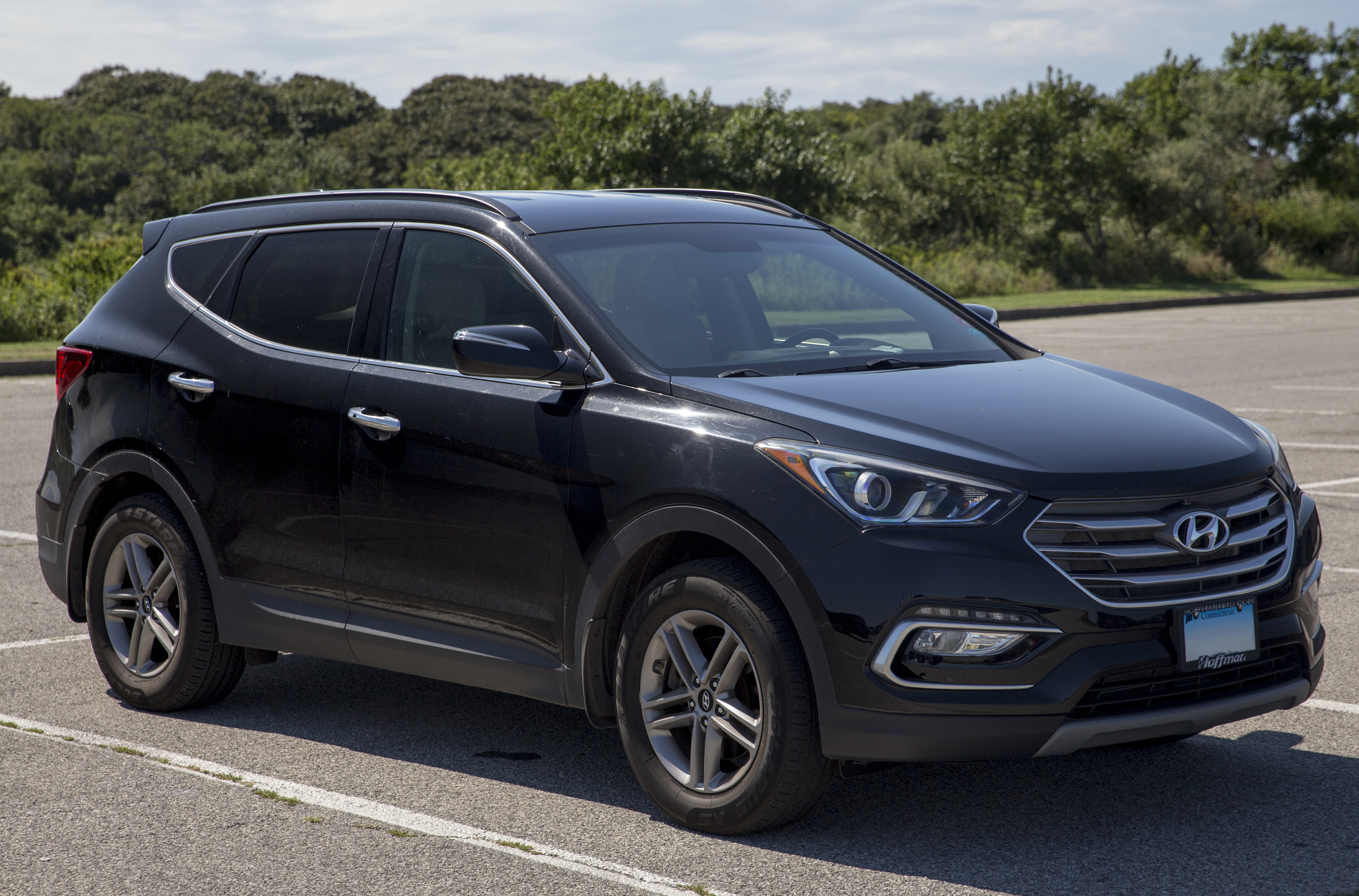
Hyundai Santa Fe/Santa Fe Sport (DM)

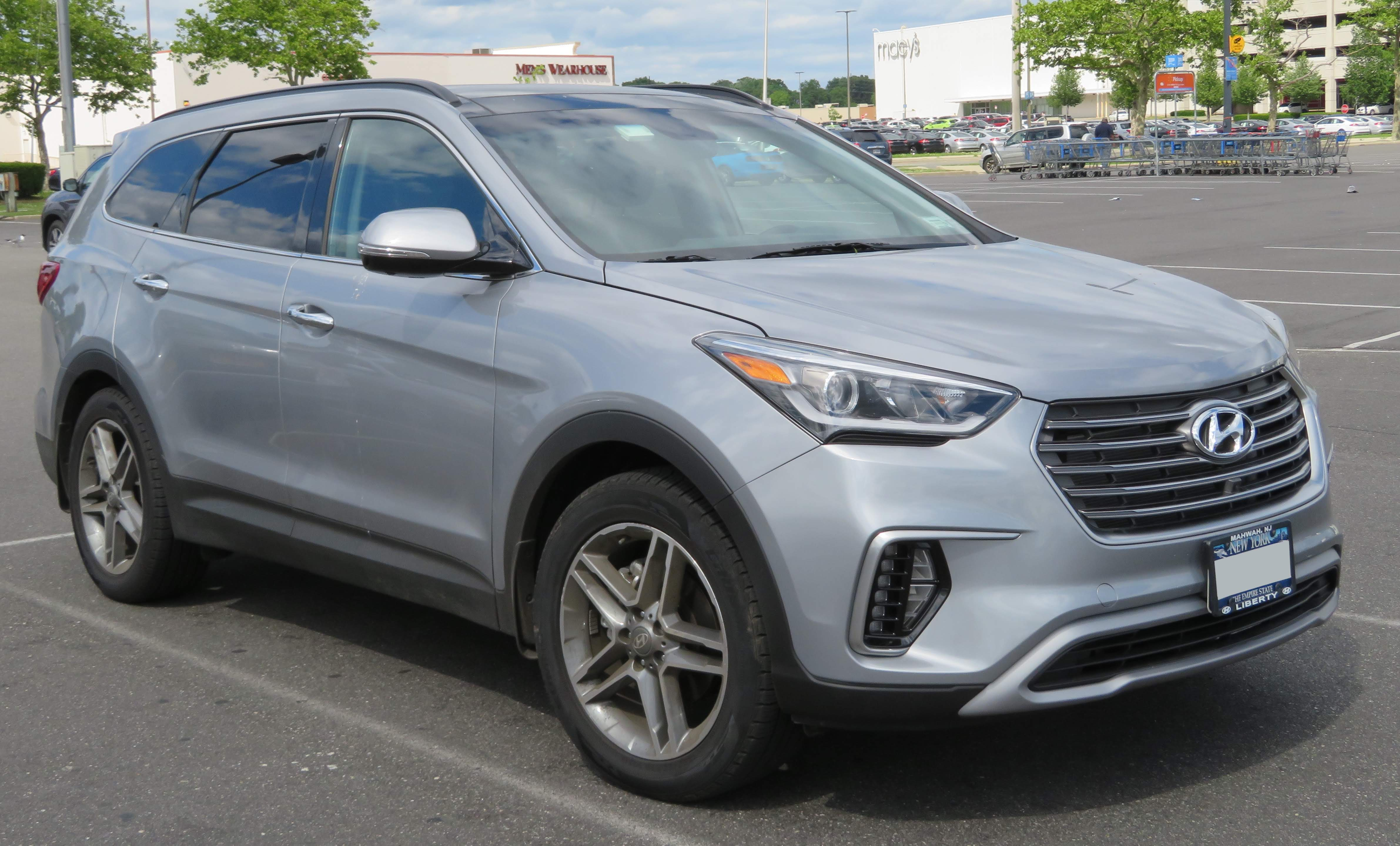
Hyundai Maxcruz/Santa Fe/Grand Santa Fe/Santa Fe XL (NC)

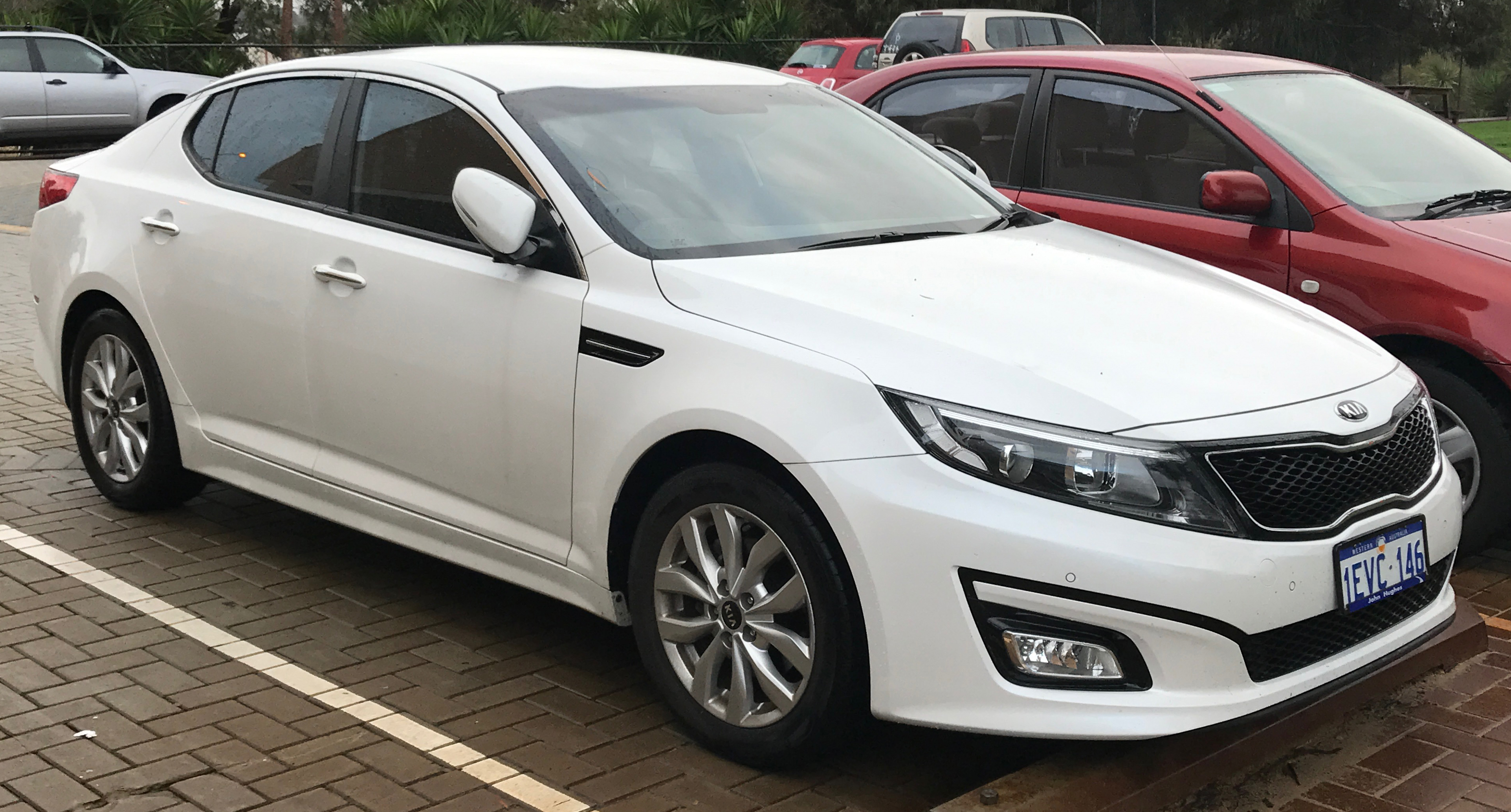
Kia Optima/K5 (TF)

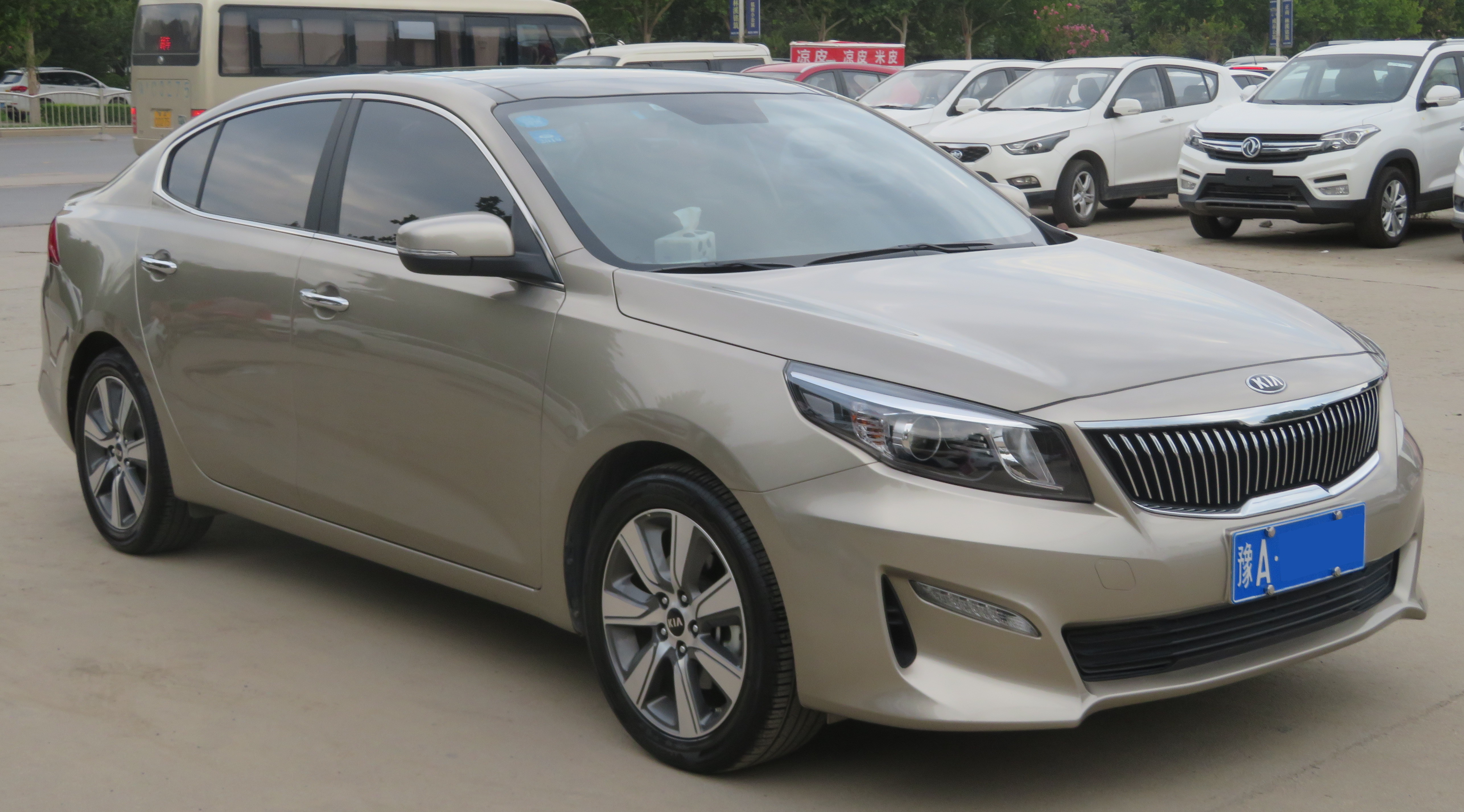
Kia K4 (PF)

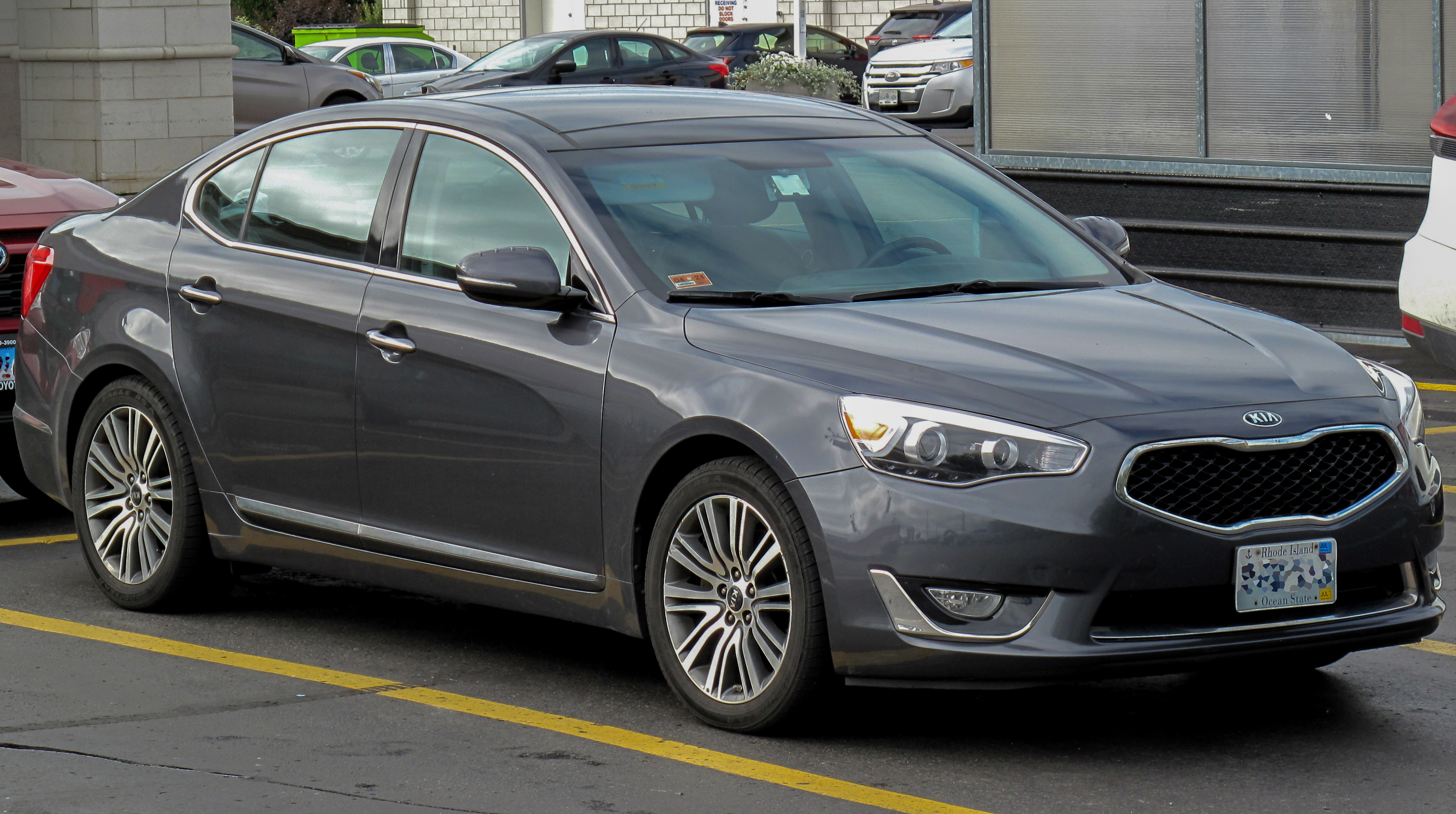
Kia K7/Cadenza (VG)

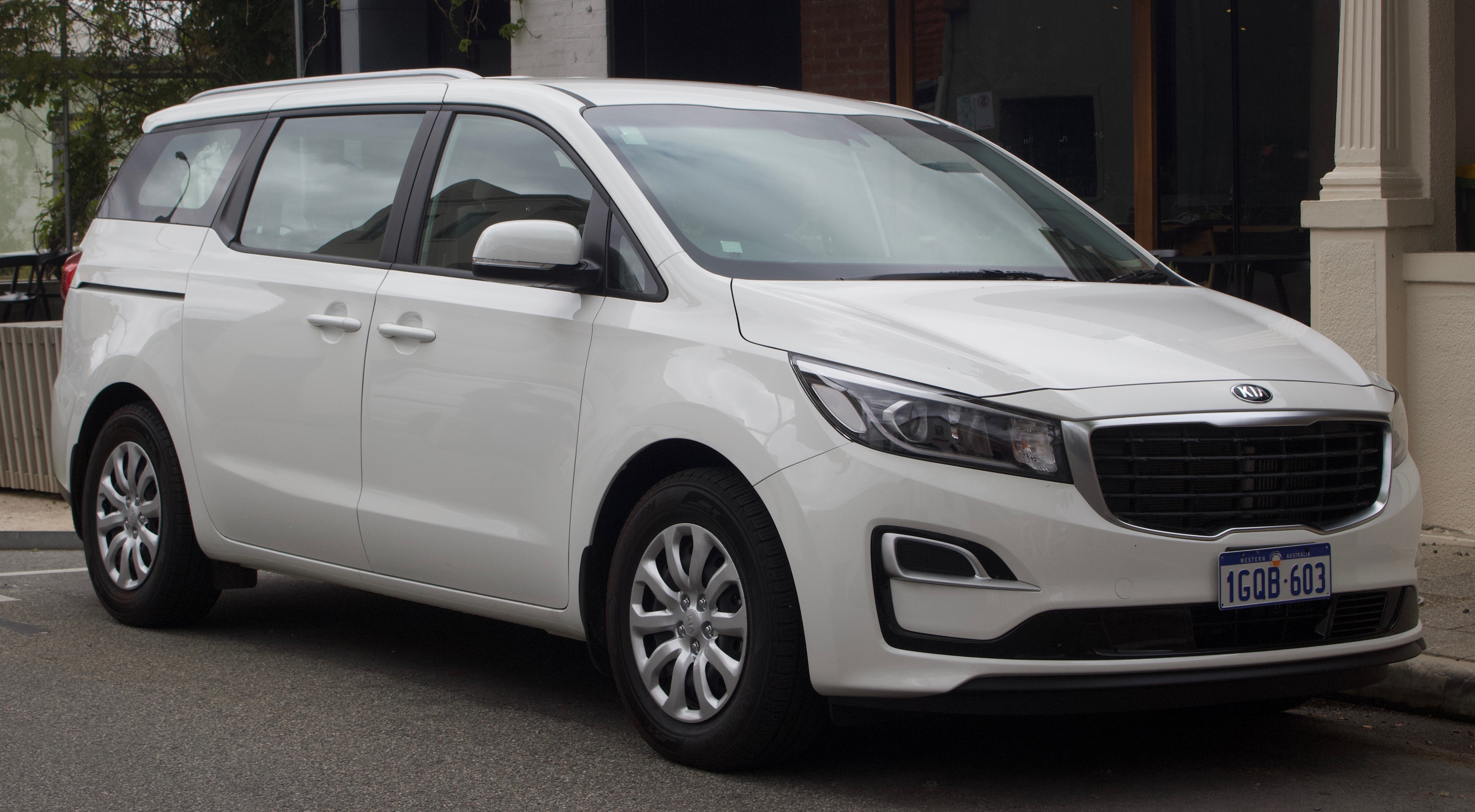
Kia Carnival/Sedona (YP)

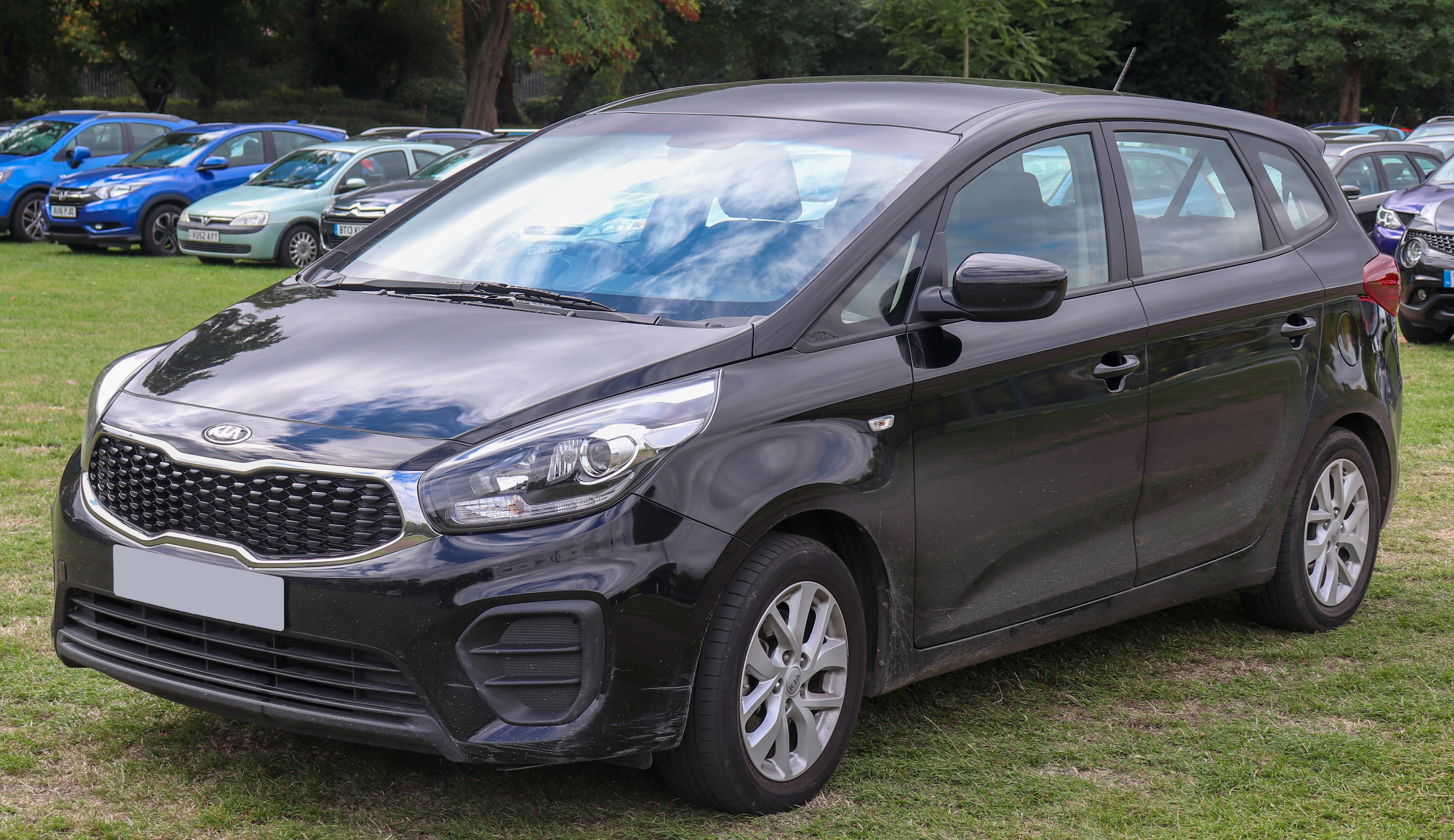
Kia Carens (RP)
