= Hyundai IHL =

Hyundai IHL Co., Ltd.
- Formerly: Inhee Industries Co., Ltd. (1993–1997); Inhee Lighting Co., Ltd. (1997–2005); IHL Corp (2005–2011)
- Company type: Subsidiary
- Industry: Automotive
- Founded: October 1993
- Headquarters: Gyeongju, South Korea
- Area served: Worldwide
- Key people: Chyu Hyun-dok (CEO)
- Products: Automotive lighting
- Parent: Hyundai Motor Group
- Website: www.ihl.co.kr

Hyundai IHL Co., Ltd. is an automotive components manufacturing company headquartered in Gyeongju, South Korea. It was established in 1993 as Inhee Industrial Co. and changed its name to IHL in 2005. Its principal products are car lights.
