= Hyundai AutoEver =

South Korean automotive software company

Hyundai AutoEver Corporation
- Native name: 현대오토에버 주식회사
- Company type: Public
- Traded as: KRX: 307950
- Founded: 2000; 26 years ago
- Headquarters: Seoul, South Korea
- Parent: Hyundai Motor Group
- Website: hyundai-autoever.com

Hyundai AutoEver Corporation (Korean: 현대오토에버 주식회사), a Hyundai Motor Group affiliate, is a mobility software company headquartered in Seoul, South Korea. Founded in 2000, Hyundai AutoEver specializes in software development and system integration, providing IT services throughout the entire group.

== See also ==
- Automotive navigation system
