= Hyundai Motor Group =

South Korean multinational conglomerate

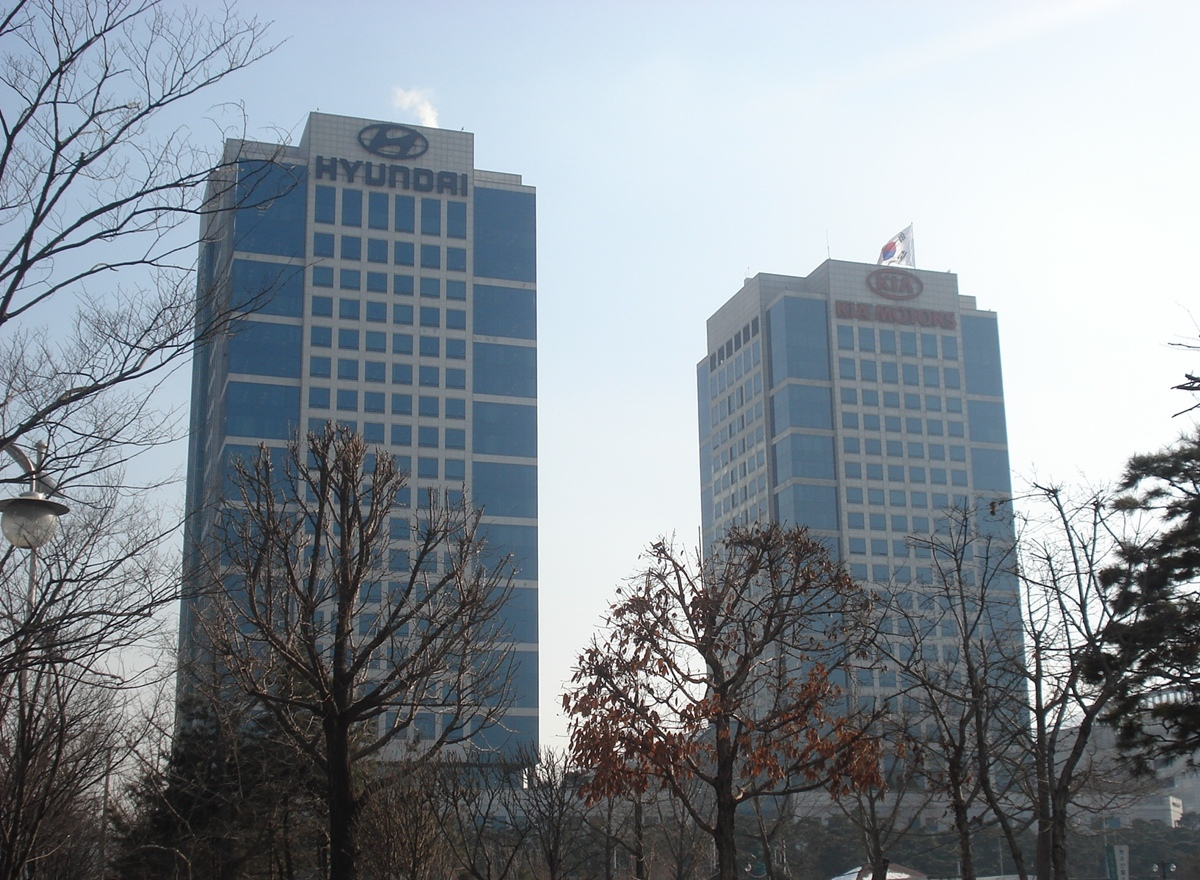
- Global headquarters in Seoul (2011)
- Native name: 현대자동차그룹
- Type: Public
- Founded: 1998; 28 years ago
- Headquarters: Seoul, South Korea
- Area served: Worldwide
- Key people: Chung Mong-koo (honorary chairman); Chung Eui-sun (Executive Chairman & CEO); Chang Jae-hoon (Vice Chairman)
- Production output: ▲7,272,453 vehicles (2025)
- Revenue: ₩295.1 trillion (2025) (US$207.6 billion)
- Operating income: ₩15.8 trillion (2025) (US$11.1 billion)
- Net income: ₩15.3 trillion (2025) (US$10.8 billion)
- Total assets: ₩320.8 trillion (2025) (US$225.7 billion)
- Number of employees: 292,575 (2021)
- Subsidiaries: See § Affiliates
- Website: www.hyundaimotorgroup.com

- Hyundai Motor Group
- Hangul: 현대자동차그룹
- Hanja: 現代自動車그룹
- RR: Hyeondae jadongcha geurup
- MR: Hyŏndae chadongch'a kŭrup
- IPA: [hjəːndɛ]

The Hyundai Motor Group (HMG; IPA: [ˈçjəːndɛ]; stylized as HYUNDAI) is a South Korean chaebol (loosely similar to a multinational conglomerate but without a central holding company or ownership structure) headquartered in Seoul, South Korea.

The HMG also refers to the group of affiliated companies interconnected by complex shareholding arrangements, with Hyundai Motor Company regarded as the de facto representative of the group. It is the third-largest South Korean chaebol, after Samsung and SK Group, related to other Hyundai-name industries following a specialized development split and restructuring which resulted in the creation of Hyundai Motor Group, Hyundai Heavy Industries Group, Hyundai Development Company Group, Hyundai Department Store Group, and Hyundai Marine & Fire Insurance.

== History ==
The group was formed through the purchase of 51% of Kia by Hyundai Motor Company in 1998. As of 2011, Hyundai owns 33.7% of Kia Motors.

In June 2021, Hyundai Motor, Hyundai Mobis, Hyundai Glovis, and Hyundai Motor Group Executive Chair Chung Eui-sun collectively purchased an 80% stake in Boston Dynamics, which had been under SoftBank Group's ownership.

On May 22, 2022, the Hyundai Motor Group announced the company would invest an additional $5 billion in the United States by the year 2025. The investment would strengthen collaboration with US firms in areas such as urban air mobility, autonomous driving, artificial intelligence, and robotics. The investments were announced during a visit to South Korea by former President Joe Biden.

On December 10, 2024, Hyundai allowed customers to buy Hyundai cars on Amazon. They could pick it up at their local Hyundai dealership.

In August 2026, 40,000 Hyundai Motor union members in South Korea held a one-day strike, seeking higher pay.

== Businesses ==
The largest member of the chaebol, Hyundai Motor Company, has a stake in Kia, and they are the largest and second largest car manufacturers in the country respectively. Following several years of rapid growth, the Group sold 8.01 million vehicles in 2015, falling short of its sales target. In 2017 the Group sold 7.25 million vehicles, the lowest in five years at that point. From 2022 to 2024 it was the world's third-largest automaker by sales, behind Toyota and Volkswagen Group. In 2024 Hyundai and Kia sold 7.23 million vehicles combined.

On 17 June 2024, Hyundai Motor India announced its commencement of an initial public offering (IPO) process to list on the Mumbai-based Bombay Stock Exchange.

Hyundai Motor Group announced plans to invest a record $16.7 billion in South Korea in 2024, focusing on green technologies and future mobility, marking its largest annual investment commitment.

Hyundai Motor Group Chairman Chung Eui-sun announced that he would invest 31 trillion won in the U.S. over four years, and Trump responded by saying he would exempt the company from tariffs.

In August 2026, Hyundai Motor and Kia were reported to have obtained a U.S. patent for a shared vehicle system that detects inattentive driving and automatically switches to autonomous mode, with fares calculated based on manual and autonomous driving time. The invention, first filed in South Korea in 2020, remained under examination by the Korean Intellectual Property Office as of August 2026 after a November 2025 rejection for lack of inventive step and a March 2026 rebuttal narrowing the patent claims.

== Affiliates ==
Automobile

- Hyundai Motor Company
- Kia Corporation
- Genesis Motor
- Ioniq

Manufacturing

- Hyundai Steel
- Hyundai Rotem
- Hyundai Translead

Auto parts

- Hyundai Mobis
- Hyundai IHL
- Hyundai WIA

Construction

- Hyundai Engineering & Construction
- Hyundai Engineering (HEC)

Finance

- Hyundai Capital
- Hyundai Card

Others

- Boston Dynamics
- Hyundai AutoEver
- Hyundai Glovis
- Ionna (Joint venture)
- Motional
- INNOCEAN
- Supernal

== Hydrogen ==
The Hydrogen Wave global online forum was held on 7 September 2021. Hyundai Motor Group set out the vision of the hydrogen business and the substance of hydrogen fuel cells and hydrogen mobility. In addition, the Group has set out Hydrogen Vision 2040.

Vision FK, a high-performance hydrogen fuel cell vehicle, was unveiled. Vision FK does not use standard, common vehicle parts and combines the Hydrogen Fuel Cell System and PE System developed under collaboration with Limak. The Hydrogen Fuel Cell System is utilized as a main power source during FK's low speed driving or for the management of battery condition. Two 2 kg hydrogen fuel tanks are located above the rear axle. The 2nd generation fuel cell stacks, with average power of 85 kW to maximum 95 kW, are located above the front axle. The PE System, which consists of two motor drives, a decelerator, inverter, and battery, helps to exercise power during the high speed or dynamic driving. The total output of two motor drives applied to the rear-wheel is over 500 kW.

In December 2021, Hyundai suspended development of its Genesis, and possibly its other, hydrogen cars.

== Sports marketing ==
=== Hyundai Motor Company ===
- Jeonbuk Hyundai Motors FC
- FIFA World Cup
- UEFA Euro
- Korea Football Association
- International Ski Federation
- International Cricket Council
- Indian national cricket team
- A-League
- Olympique Lyonnais
- PFC CSKA Moscow
- Millonarios Fútbol Club
- National Football League
- Super Bowl MVP presentation during the years CBS airs the Super Bowl
- Hyundai Motorsport
- ICC Champions Trophy
- Hyundai Tournament of Champions
- FIS Ski Jumping World Cup
- FIS Ski-Flying World Championships
- FIS Nordic World Ski Championships
- Carlton Football Club
- Brisbane Lions
- Raja Club Athletic
- Wydad Athletic Club
- Chelsea Football Club
- Major League Baseball
- ASEAN Hyundai Cup

=== Kia ===
- Kia Tigers
- FIFA World Cup
- UEFA European Championship
- Copa America
- National Basketball Association
- Liga ACB
- FITA Archery World Cup
- Kia Classic (LPGA)
- Australian Open
- South Korea national speed skating team
- Sociedade Esportiva Palmeiras
- Surrey County Cricket Club
- Essendon Football Club
- Greater Western Sydney Giants
- Rafael Nadal
- Kia World Extreme Games
- AC Monza
- NBA
- WNBA
- G League

=== Other affiliate teams ===
- Ulsan Mobis Phoebus
- Cheonan Hyundai Capital Skywalkers
- Suwon Hyundai E&C Volleyball Team
- Incheon Hyundai Steel Red Angels

== See also ==
- 2025 Georgia Hyundai plant immigration raid
- Hyundai
- Hyundai and unions
- List of manufacturers by motor vehicle production
- List of Korean car makers
- List of automotive manufacturers by production
