= Hyundai and unions =

South Korean company's labor relations

Workers at various companies with roots in South Korea's chaebol owned Hyundai began to establish labor unions following the June 29 Declaration in 1987. Hyundai executives have been arrested for arranging violent attacks on labor organizers.

== History ==
Employees of Hyundai Engine registered the first union in the corporate group on July 6, 1987. Similar attempts by workers at Hyundai's shipyards and Hyundai Motors were thwarted by the registration of yellow unions, triggering demonstrations across the group in August 1987.

In response, Chung Ju-yung, the founder of Hyundai, reportedly called upon his employees who had served in the Marine Corps, declaring union riots to be a part of a communist plot and appealing for the Marine Corps to once more “come to the defense of the motherland by defeating the labor union at Hyundai” (Ogle 1990: 120). Hyundai’s labour issue soon spread to other conglomerates.

Mr. Chung once said, “I can allow labor unions in my company, but only over my dead body.”

The South Korean government urged Hyundai to recognize the workers's new unions. Hyundai Precision Industry workers held executives hostage in its 1988 strikes.

In 2016, the unions of Hyundai Motor and Hyundai Heavy Industries staged their first collective strike in 23 years.

=== HD Hyundai ===
Manual workers were seen as ‘slaves’ or ‘animals’ by managers who wielded unchecked power like a ‘god’; they ‘would not dare to confront their shop-floor managers’ due to fear of retaliation (Ulsan Labor Oral History, 2007, pp. 1779–1781).

In July 1987, thousands of workers at Hyundai Heavy Industries (HHI) staged unauthorized strikes for days during the Great Workers' Struggle. Regular workers demanded the abolition of precarious employment due to the potential of non-regular workers breaking the 1987 strike. By 1988, most regular and non-regular workers had joined the HHI labor union. In 1989, a 3-month strike at the HHI shipyard was ended by a police raid. The police also cracked down on a three-day strike in 1990, arresting union leaders.

Although regular workers did gain improved conditions, HHI began to expand by increasing non-regular workers, to whom 3D jobs were relegated.

In 1993, HHI workers approved a new wage contract after the government threatened to force a settlement. Starting that year, HHI's management imposed a "no labor, no wages" rule, discouraging walkouts. HHI had a period of no wage-related disputes from the mid-1990s into the late 2000s.

According to a militant union activist, ‘as regular workers became better off, their consciousness changed dramatically; they supported pro-employer business unionists while we militant unionists lost power on the shop floor’ (Interviewee #17, regular worker, 14 September 2017).

In 2003, an independent non-regular workers union was launched at HHI. In 2004, the Korean Confederation of Trade Unions expelled HHI's union for its behavior after a suicide by a contract worker in protest of discrimination against temporary workers. Business unionists, managers, and company police attacked non-regular worker protests and destroyed the funeral parlor. Unionized non-regular workers who protested HHI's reaction to the suicide were dismissed and blacklisted from the industry.

HHI's union was criticized by the Korean Metal Workers’ Union (KMWU) for voluntarily yielding decisions to the company during the 2008 financial crisis. In 2014, unionized workers at HHI staged a partial strike for the first time in 20 years. In 2016, HHI's union rejoined the KMWU after 12 years amidst the company's restructuring. In 2017, HHI's union staged its first full walkout in 23 years amidst the proposed splitting of the firms' units in preparation for merging with Daewoo Shipbuilding & Marine Engineering. In 2019, unionized HHI workers went on strike in opposition to the company's plan to merge with DSME. In 2022, unionists at HHI went on joint strike with Hyundai Mipo Dockyard and Hyundai Samho Heavy Industries for collective bargaining. Workers at HD Hyundai Heavy Industries and HD Hyundai Mipo went on strike to protest merging the two in 2025. In an unusual move, hundreds of foreign workers joined the HD HHI chapter of the KMWU in 2026.

=== Hyundai Motor Group ===
Hyundai Motor Group affiliates have gone on strike for reasons beyond wage negotiations, in instances such as the 1996–1997 strikes in South Korea, the sale of Daewoo Motors, the U.S.-South Korea free trade agreement, the impeachment of President Park Geun-hye, and President Yoon Suk Yeol's declaration of martial law.

==== Hyundai Motor Company ====
===== Domestic =====
The Hyundai Motor union was the largest workplace union in South Korea until 2026. The Hyundai Motor Company union joined the more specialized Federation of Korean Metal Workers Trade Unions in 2006 after it voted to leave the Korean Confederation of Trade Unions. As of 2018, there were strikes by the union every year except for four. Full-day strikes have been less frequent.

====== Strike timeline ======
(Note: Year-straddling is indicated if only sources from one year describing the crossover were located.) (Note: Although the singular tense "strike" is used, there may have been multiple strikes, depending on the year.)
Year	Union action	Ref.
1988	Strike	
1989	Strike	(Note: WP:RSP exclusively describing strikes in 1989 not yet located.)
1990	Strike	
1991	Strike	
1992	Strike	
1993	Strike	
1994	No strike	
1995	Strike	
1996	Strike	
1997	Strike	
1998	Strike	
1999	Strike canceled	
1999	Strike	
2000	Strike	
2001	Strike	
2002	Strike	
2003	Strike	
2004	Strike	
2005	Strike	
2006	Strike	
2007	Strike	
2008	Strike	
2009	No strike	
2010	No strike	
2011	No strike	
2012	Strike	
2013	Strike	
2014	Strike	
2015	Strike	
2016	Strike	
2017	Strike	
2018	Strike	
2019	No strike	
2020	No strike	
2021	No strike	
2022	No strike	
2023	Strike	(Note: Although the source for 2024 says that the union did not strike, it describes it in a wage-related context, as other sources sometimes specify. Another source describes an unrelated political strike in 2023.)
2024	Strike	
2025	Strike	
2026	Strike	

====== Contract workers' union ======
In 2010, Hyundai Motor's contract workers' union went on strike to demand permanent jobs while the Supreme Court's creation of a status change threshold was under review. As such protests were illegal under South Korean labor law, the police requested arrest warrants. Hyundai Motor sought compensation from the workers for strike-related losses for such strikes. Two such cases were eventually reviewed by the Supreme Court. In 2014, the Seoul Central District Court ruled that hundreds of subcontracted workers should be regarded as direct Hyundai Motor employees. The settlement included compensation for delinquent wages.

===== International =====
In March 2002, Hyundai Motor Company retracted a statement that they would seek a relationship with the United Automobile Workers (UAW) in the US.

In 2009 and 2010, workers at Hyundai Motor India went on strike to demand "the rehiring of laid off workers" and the recognition of the labor union rather than "an existing worker's committee". The sacked employees were rehired.

In 2024, more than 30% of Hyundai Motor Manufacturing Alabama plant workers signed cards for joining the UAW.

==== Kia Motors ====
The union of Kia Motors went on strike every year between its formation in 1991 and Hyundai's takeover in 1999. It continued to go on regular strikes until 2010 and started again after 2011. The next period of strike-free negotiations started in 2021.

==== Hyundai Steel ====
Hyundai Steel made a labor deal with unions in 2026, the first such agreement with subcontracted workers after the Yellow Envelope law took effect.

== See also ==
- HD Hyundai
