= Hyundai Motor Company =

South Korean multinational automaker

Coordinates: 35.544890°N 129.372108°E

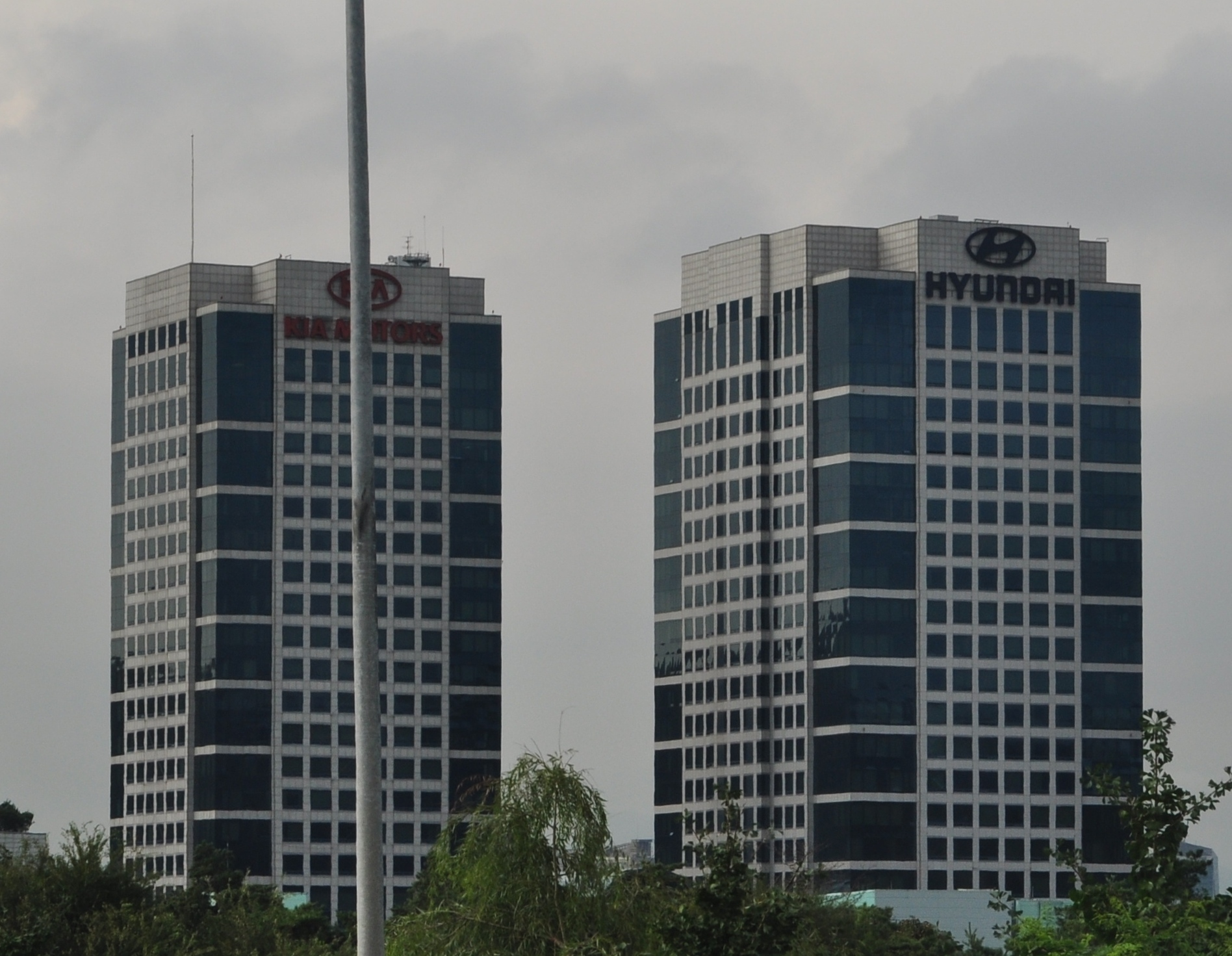
- Headquarters (right) in Seoul, South Korea
- Native name: 현대자동차
- Type: Public
- Traded as: KRX: 005380; LSE: HYUD
- Industry: Automotive
- Founded: 29 December 1967; 58 years ago
- Founder: Chung Ju-yung
- Headquarters: Seoul, South Korea
- Area served: Worldwide
- Key people: Chung Eui-sun (Executive Chair of Hyundai Motor Group); Jaehoon Chang (Vice Chair of Hyundai Motor Group); Jose Muñoz (President & CEO of Hyundai Motor Company); SangYup Lee (Chief Designer)
- Production output: ▼4,146,335 vehicles (2024)
- Revenue: ▲ ₩186.25 trillion (US$138.97 billion) (2025)
- Operating income: ▼ ₩11.47 trillion (US$8.56 billion) (2025)
- Net income: ▼ ₩10.36 trillion (US$7.73 billion) (2025)
- Total assets: ▲ ₩368.84 trillion (US$275.2 billion) (2025)
- Total equity: ▲ ₩127.65 trillion (US$95.24 billion) (2025)
- Owners: Hyundai Mobis (22.36%); National Pension Service (7.76%); Chung Mong-koo (5.57%); Chung Eui-sun (2.73%); (Note: As of 18 March 2026)
- Number of employees: 126,407 (2024)
- Parent: Hyundai Motor Group
- Divisions: Genesis; Ioniq
- Subsidiaries: List: Hyundai Motor India Hyundai Motors Indonesia Hyundai Motor America Hyundai of Canada Hyundai Motor of South America Hyundai do Brasil Hyundai China Beijing Hyundai Hyundai Japan Hyundai Motor Philippines Hyundai Motor Europe
- Website: hyundai.com

- Hyundai Motor Company
- Hangul: 현대자동차
- Hanja: 現代自動車
- RR: Hyeondae jadongcha
- MR: Hyŏndae chadongch'a
- IPA: [çəːndɛ]

Hyundai Motor Company, often referred to as Hyundai Motors (Korean: 현대자동차) and commonly known as Hyundai (현대; [çəːndɛ] (Note: Pronunciations in English vary, and include: /ˈh(j)ʌndeɪ/ H(Y)UN-day; /ˈh(j)ʌndaɪ/ H(Y)UN-dye; /haɪˈuːndaɪ/ hy-OON-dye; /hiˈʌndeɪ/ hee-UN-day; The closest English pronunciation to the original Korean would be /ˈhjʌndɛ/ HYUN-deh, but the final vowel is checked and cannot occur word-final in English.); 'modernity'), is a South Korean multinational automotive manufacturer established in 1967. Currently, the company owns 33.88 percent of Kia Corporation, and owns a luxury cars subsidiary, Genesis. The three brands altogether make up the Hyundai Motor Group.

Headquartered at the Hyundai Motor Group complex in Seoul, Hyundai operates the world's largest single integrated automobile manufacturing facility in Ulsan, South Korea. Established in 1968, the Ulsan plant spans approximately 5,000,000 m²—about 670 football fields—and employs around 31,000 workers, with an annual completed-vehicle production capacity of 1.52 million units. The company employs approximately 75,000 people worldwide. Hyundai vehicles are sold in 193 countries through 5,000 dealerships and showrooms. As of November 2024, Hyundai is the world's third-largest carmaker in terms of production, behind competitors Toyota and Volkswagen.

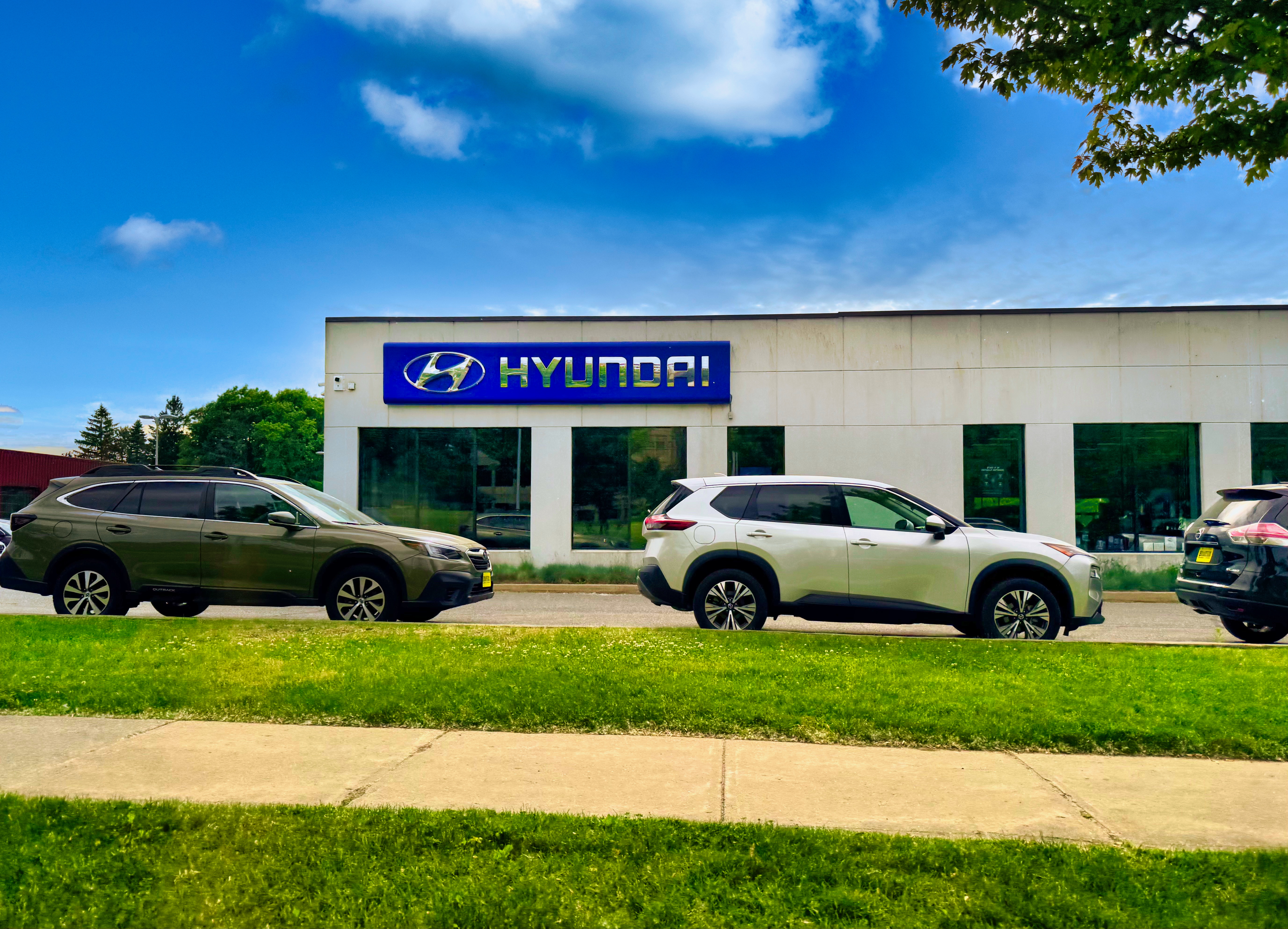
A Hyundai dealership in Burlington, Vermont

Hyundai's product portfolio includes passenger cars, SUVs, commercial vehicles and hydrogen fuel-cell vehicles sold under the Hyundai marque alongside its Genesis luxury division and the Ioniq and N sub-brands. Recent technology and product initiatives include battery-electric vehicles based on the Electric-Global Modular Platform (E-GMP) and continued hydrogen fuel-cell development. In 2025, Hyundai sold about 4.14 million vehicles worldwide and reported record annual revenue of ₩186.3 trillion, while operating profit declined to ₩11.47 trillion amid tariff and competitive pressures.

== History ==
=== Early years ===
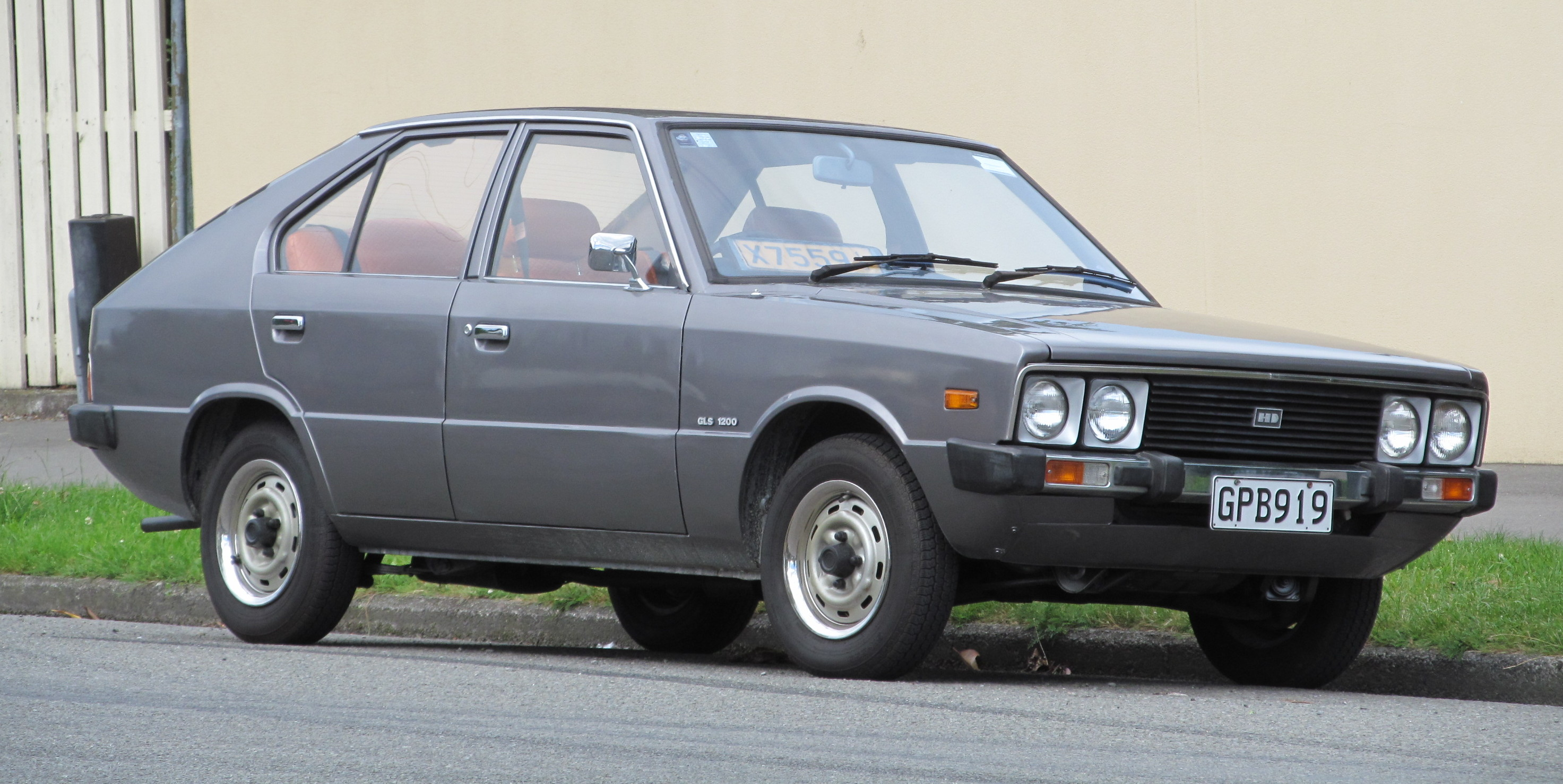
1982 Hyundai Pony

Chung Ju-yung (1915–2001) founded the Hyundai Engineering and Construction Company in 1947. Hyundai Motor Company was founded in 1967 with his brother Chung Se-yung. and the company's first model, the Cortina, was released in cooperation with Ford Motor Company in 1968. When Hyundai wanted to develop its own car, it hired George Turnbull in February 1974, the former managing director of Austin Morris at British Leyland. He in turn hired five other top British car engineers. They were body designer Kenneth Barnett, engineers John Simpson and Edward Chapman, John Crosthwaite, formerly of BRM, as chassis engineer and Peter Slater as chief development engineer. In 1975, the Pony, the first South Korean car, was released, with styling by Giorgio Giugiaro of Italdesign and powertrain technology provided by Japan's Mitsubishi Motors. Exports began in the following year to Ecuador and soon thereafter to the Benelux countries. Hyundai entered the British market in 1982, selling 2993 cars in its first year there.

In 1984, Hyundai began exporting the Pony to Canada, but not to the United States, as the Pony would not pass emissions standards there. Canadian sales greatly exceeded expectations, and it was at one point the top-selling car on the Canadian market. In 1985, the one millionth Hyundai car was built. Until the 1986 introduction of the larger Hyundai Grandeur, Hyundai offered a locally assembled Ford Granada for the South Korean executive market. The import of these knocked down kits was permitted as long as Hyundai exported five cars for every single Granada brought in (the same demands were placed on Kia).

=== Overseas expansion ===
In 1986, Hyundai began to sell cars in the United States, and the Excel was nominated as "Best Product #10" by Fortune magazine, largely because of its affordability. The company began to produce models with its own technology in 1988, beginning with the midsize Sonata. In the spring of 1990, aggregate production of Hyundai automobiles reached the four million mark. In 1991, the company succeeded in developing its first proprietary gasoline engine, the four-cylinder Alpha, and also its own transmission, thus paving the way for technological independence.

In 1996, Hyundai Motor India Limited was established with a production plant in Irungattukottai near Chennai, India.

In 1998, after a shake-up in the South Korean auto industry caused by overambitious expansion and the Asian financial crisis, Hyundai acquired the majority of rival Kia Motors.

=== Design and quality improvements ===
In 1998, Hyundai began to overhaul its image in an attempt to establish itself as a world-class brand. Chung Ju-yung transferred leadership of Hyundai Motor to his son, Chung Mong-koo, in 1999. Hyundai's parent company, Hyundai Motor Group, invested heavily in the quality, design, manufacturing, and long-term research of its vehicles. It added a 10-year or 100,000-mile (160,000 km) warranty to cars sold in the United States and launched an aggressive marketing campaign.

In 2004, Hyundai was ranked second in "initial quality" in a survey/study by J.D. Power and Associates in North America. Hyundai is now one of the top 100 most valuable brands worldwide according to Interbrand. Since 2002, Hyundai has also been one of the worldwide official sponsors of the FIFA World Cup.

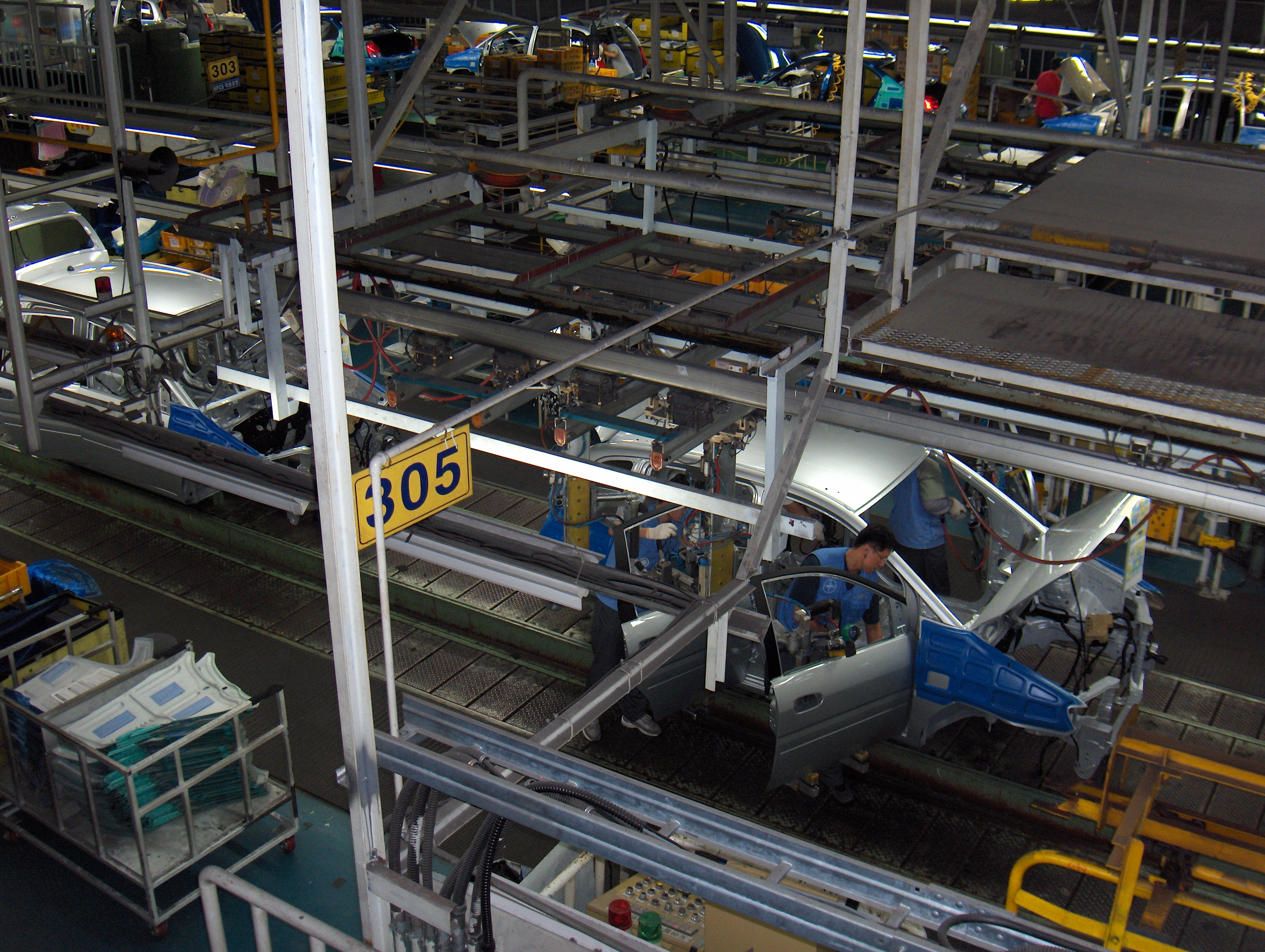
The world's largest automobile manufacturing plant in Ulsan, South Korea, produces over 1.6 million vehicles annually.

In 2004, Hyundai Motor Company had $57.2 billion in sales in South Korea making it the country's second largest corporation, or chaebol, after Samsung. Worldwide sales in 2005 reached 2,533,695 units, an 11% increase over the previous year.

In 2006, the South Korean government initiated an investigation of Chung Mong-koo's practices as head of Hyundai, suspecting him of corruption. On 28 April 2006, Chung was arrested, and charged for embezzlement of 100 billion South Korean won (US$106 million). As a result, Hyundai vice chairman and CEO, Kim Dong-jin, replaced him as head of the company.

In 2011, Hyundai sold 4.05 million cars worldwide and the Hyundai Motor Group was the world's fourth largest automaker behind GM, Volkswagen and Toyota. On 30 September 2011, Yang Seung-suk announced his retirement as CEO of Hyundai Motor Co. In the interim replacement period, Chung Mong-koo and Kim Eok-jo divided the duties of the CEO position.

In 2014, Hyundai started an initiative to focus on improving vehicle dynamics in its vehicles and hired Albert Biermann, former Vice President of Engineering at BMW M, to direct chassis development for Hyundai vehicles, stating: "The company intends to become a technical leader in ride and handling, producing vehicles that lead their respective segments for driver engagement."

=== 2020–present ===
On 14 October 2020, Euisun Chung was inaugurated as the new chairman of the Hyundai Motor Group. His father, Chung Mong-koo, has been made Honorary Chairman.

In April 2021, the company said that its profits rose by 187%, the highest rise in four years. The company recorded a profit of $1.16 billion from the beginning of 2021 until March.

In May 2023, Hyundai established a joint venture with LG Energy Solution to manufacture electric vehicle batteries in the US.

In October 2024, Hyundai Motor said it had signed a 610-gigawatt-hour (GWh) power purchase agreement (PPA) with SK E&S and other partners, the latest in its renewable energy transition efforts. In November 2024, the company announced that its Global Chief Operating Officer, Jose Munoz will hold the new role of global co-CEO beginning 1 January 2025. Munoz will be the first foreigner to hold such a high executive post in a giant South Korean conglomerate. The promotion is said to be credited to Munoz's resilience and strategies in pushing for record sales in the North America region.

== Design emphasis ==
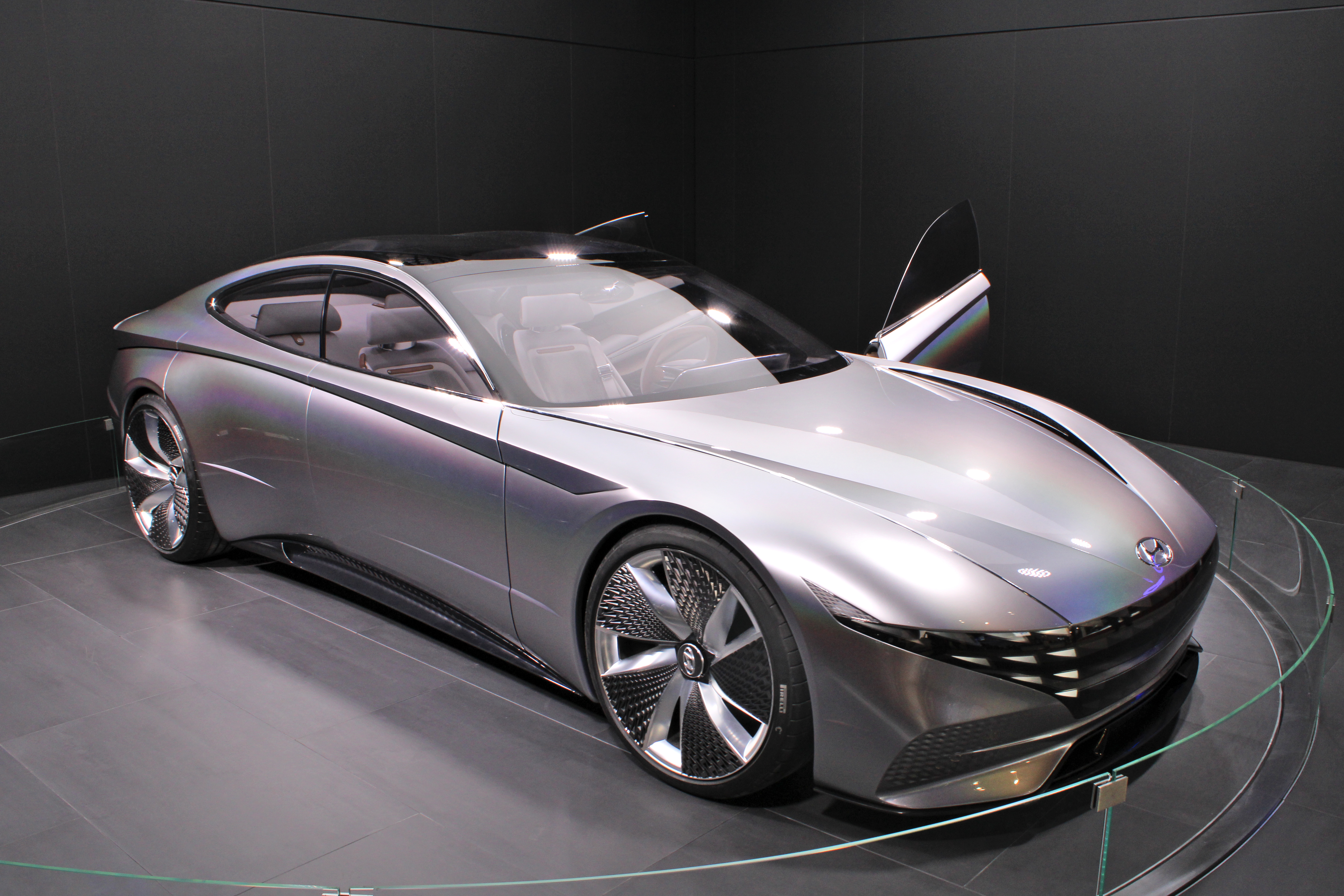
Hyundai Le Fil Rouge concept car

Hyundai's Fluidic Sculpture design philosophy, heavily inspired by nature, was introduced in the early 2000s. In 2006, Hyundai hired Thomas Bürkle as head of the company's design center in Rüsselsheim, Germany. Bürkle had previously worked for BMW, having designed the BMW 3 Series (E46), and the BMW 6 Series (E63).

In 2018, the company announced the Sensuous Sportiness next-generation design direction. The design philosophy was unveiled at the 2018 Geneva Motor Show demonstrated by the Le Fil Rouge concept car, and has been rolled out into its recent models, ranging from sedans to SUVs. The front grille was first introduced with the 2022 NX4 Generation Tucson. The Sensuous Sportiness design identity and strategy has won Design Management Institute's (DMI) Design Value Award 2020.

In 2024, Hyundai showcased a new design language called 'Art of Steel' with its Intium hydrogen fuel cell electric concept vehicle. Under this philosophy, Hyundai unveiled the Concept THREE in 2025, which featured sharper lines.

== Research and development ==
Hyundai operates research and development centres in South Korea, Germany, the United States (California), Japan, India and China.

Hyundai established the Hyundai Design Center in Fountain Valley, California in 1990. The center moved to a new $30 million facility in Irvine, California in 2003, and was renamed the Hyundai Kia Motors Design and Technical Center. The facility also housed Hyundai America Technical Center, Inc, a subsidiary responsible for all engineering activities in the U.S. for Hyundai. Hyundai America Technical Center moved to its new 200,000-square-foot (19,000 m^{2}), $117 million headquarters in Superior Township, Michigan (near Ann Arbor) in 2005.

In 2004, Hyundai America Technical Center completed construction of its Hyundai/Kia proving ground in California City, California. The 4,300-acre (17 km^{2}) facility is located in the Mojave Desert and features a 6.4-mile (10.3 km) oval track, a Vehicle Dynamics Area, a vehicle-handling course inside the oval track, a paved hill road, and several special surface roads. A 30,000-square-foot (2,800 m^{2}) complex featuring offices and indoor testing areas is located on the premises as well. The facility was built at a cost of $50 million.

In the 2021 review of WIPO's annual World Intellectual Property Indicators Hyundai ranked as 4th in the world for its 141 industrial design registrations being published under the Hague System during 2020. This position is up on its previous 7th-place ranking for 57 industrial design registrations being published in 2019.

== Regional operations ==
Top 10 Hyundai and Genesis vehicle production by country, 2024
Rank	Country	Vehicle production (by units)
1	South Korea	1,862,403
2	India	764,108
3	United States	361,073
4	Czech Republic	326,660
5	Turkey	245,660
6	Brazil	214,130
7	China	169,765
8	Indonesia	85,052
9	Vietnam	56,889
10	Mexico	16,490

Hyundai has invested in manufacturing plants in USA, India, the Czech Republic, Russia, China and Turkey as well as research and development centers in Europe, Asia, North America and the Pacific Rim.

=== North America ===
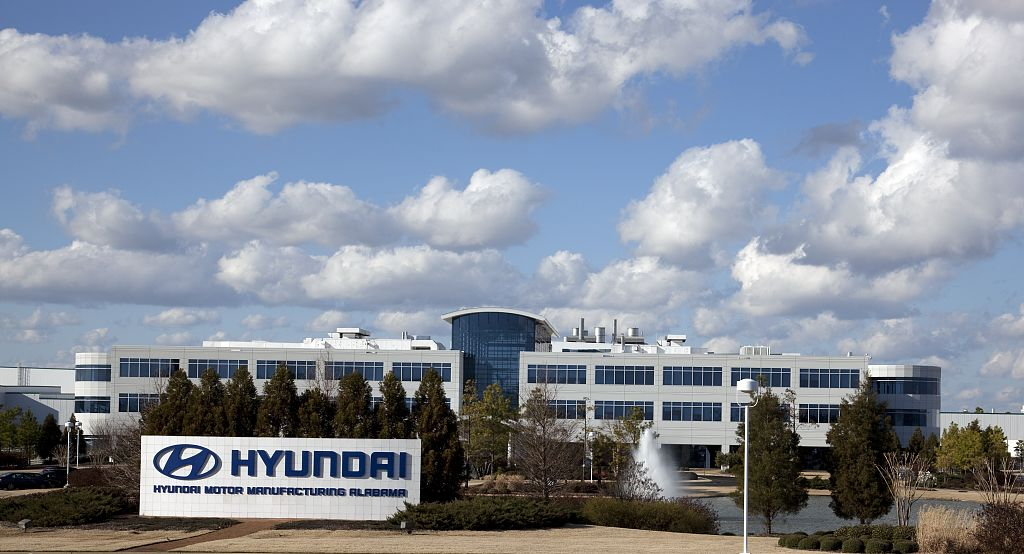
Hyundai Motor Manufacturing Alabama

==== United States ====
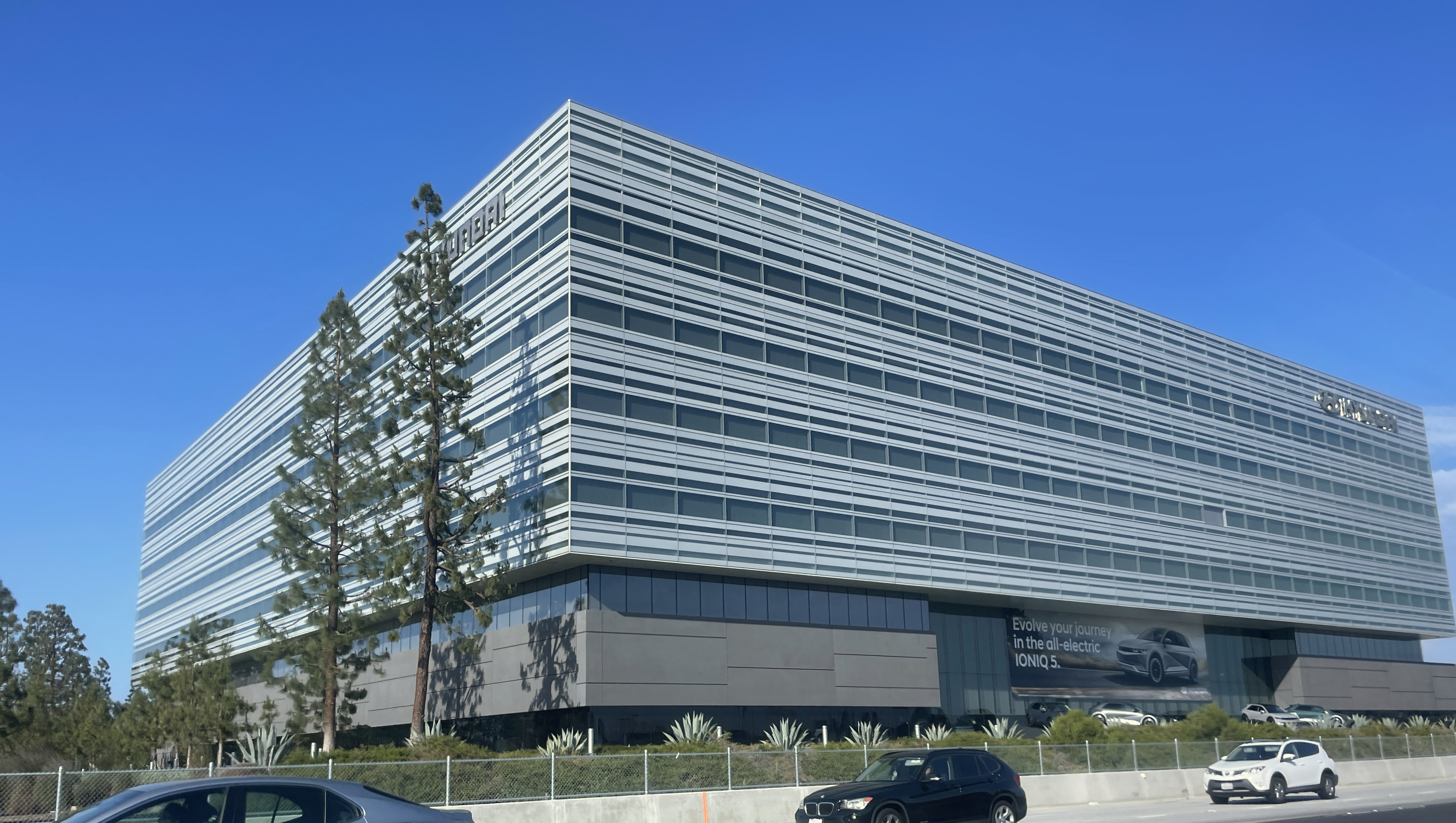
Hyundai Motor America headquarters in Fountain Valley, California

Hyundai Motor America began selling cars in the United States on 20 February 1986, with a single model, the Hyundai Excel. That year, Hyundai set a record of selling the most automobiles in its first year of business in the United States compared to any other car brand; total sales in 1986 were 168,882.

Initially well received, the Excel's faults soon became apparent; cost-cutting measures caused reliability to suffer. With an increasingly poor reputation for quality, Hyundai sales plummeted, and many dealerships either earned their profits on repairs or abandoned the product. At one point, Hyundai became the butt of many jokes (i.e. Hyundai stands for "Hope you understand nothing's driveable and inexpensive").

In response, Hyundai began investing heavily in the quality, design, manufacturing, and long-term research of its vehicles. The company added free maintenance for the first 2 years or 24,000 miles for all its new cars sold, starting with the 1992 model year. It also added a 10-year or 100,000-mile (160,000 km) powertrain warranty (known as the Hyundai Advantage) to its vehicles sold in the United States.

Hyundai incorporated a new manufacturing facility, Hyundai Motor Manufacturing Alabama, in April 2002. The new plant in Montgomery, Alabama, was completed during 2004, at a cost of $1.7 billion. Production started in May 2005. It employed more than 3,000 workers in 2012.

By 2004, sales had dramatically increased, and the reputation of Hyundai cars improved. In 2004, Hyundai tied with Honda for initial brand quality in a survey/study from J.D. Power and Associates, for having 102 problems per 1000 vehicles. This made Hyundai second in the industry, only behind Toyota, for initial vehicle quality. The company continued this tradition by placing third overall in J.D. Power's 2006 Initial Quality Survey, behind only Porsche and Lexus.

In 2009, the Hyundai Genesis luxury sedan was named 2009 North American Car of the Year, the first for Hyundai. It also won the 2009 Canadian Car of the Year after winning its category of Best New Luxury Car under $50,000. The Hyundai's V8 Tau engine in the Genesis received 2009 Ward's 10 Best Engines award.

In January 2012, the Hyundai Elantra was named the North American Car of the Year at the North American International Auto Show, selling more than 200,000 cars since the model's redesigned debut.

===== Supernal =====
Supernal
- Industry: Urban air mobility
- Founded: 2020
- Headquarters: Washington, D.C.
- Revenue: 117.61 won (2021)
- Operating income: 6.68 won (2021)
- Parent: Hyundai Motor Company
- Website: supernal.aero

The Hyundai Motor Company established Supernal, an urban air mobility (UAM) subsidiary, in the United States in 2020. The name means "Best Quality" and "Heavenly". On 8 November 2023, Hyundai announced plans to build a plant in the US to produce flying taxis. As of February 2025, a full-scale technology demonstrator was undergoing ground testing.

The prototype uses wingtip tilting rotors and four propellers fixed on booms that connect the wing to a "Bronco tail"—named after the Rockwell OV-10 Bronco tail. In 2023, Supernal established its headquarters in Washington, D.C., its research and development facility is in Fremont, California, and its engineering headquarters is in Irvine, California.

==== Canada ====
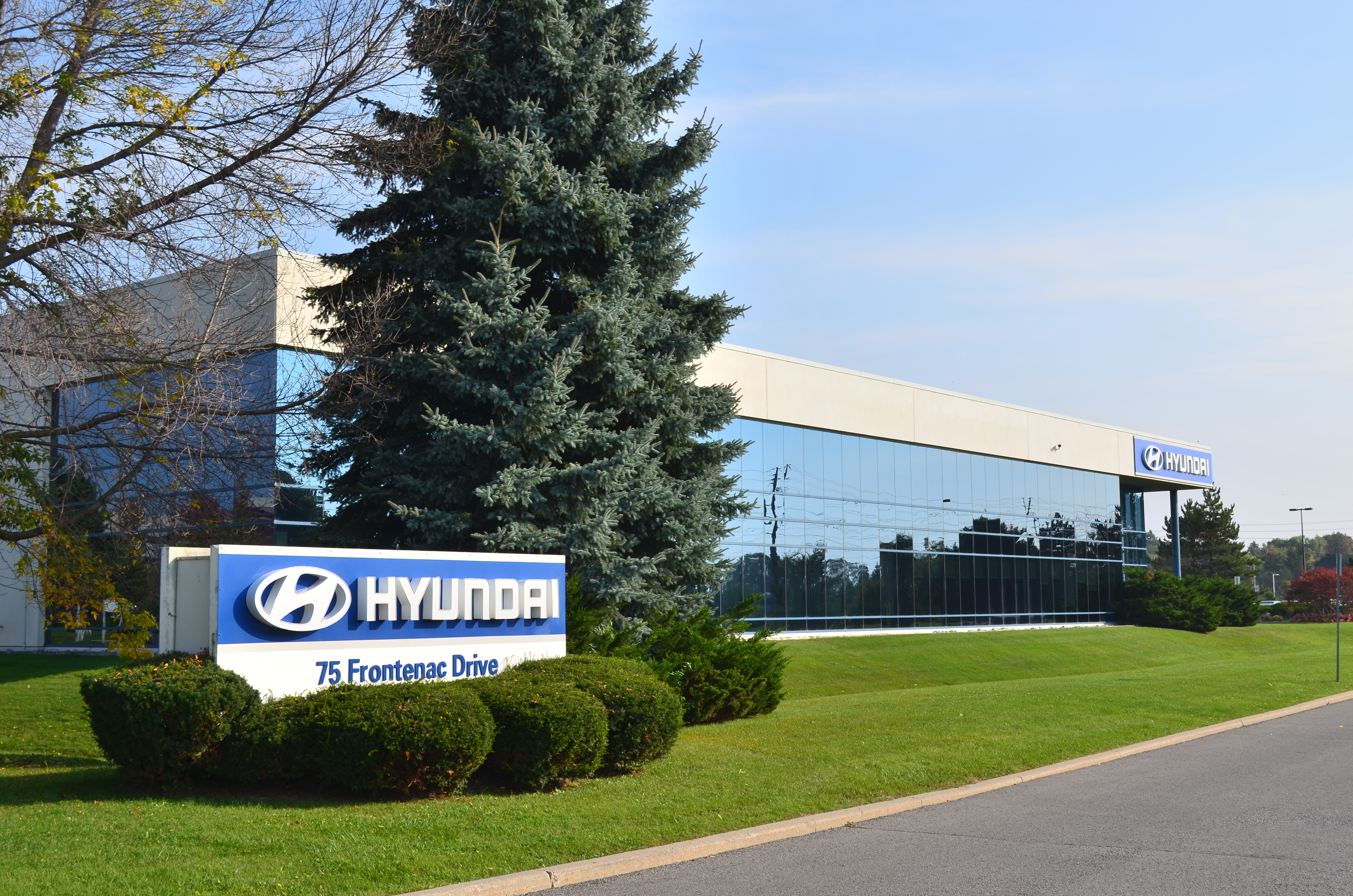
Hyundai Auto Canada office in Markham

In 1989, Hyundai Auto Canada Inc. opened a stamping and assembly plant in Bromont, Quebec, employing 800. The plant cost $387.7 million, with Quebec and Canadian federal government subsidies of $131 million. The plant was designed to manufacture approximately 2000 Hyundai Sonatas per week. Subsequently, Chrysler and Hyundai considered a joint venture that would have Chrysler rebranding the Sonata manufactured at Bromont – only to later announce the deal had failed. The Bromont plant was operational for four years before it closed – with Hyundai's sales unable to support the plant.

In 2009, Hyundai Auto Canada Inc. planned to open a new plant in Canada and resume production in Canada. Hyundai subsequently sold the plant, which was eventually purchased by Olymbec inc, a Quebec real estate developer.

Hyundai is the No. 1 import car brand in Canada without a local plant. Sales over 100,000 cars-per-year mark in 2012.

==== Mexico ====
Hyundai Motor Mexico entered the Mexican market in 2014 with the imported vehicles such as Grand i10, the Elantra, and the ix35. Soon afterwards, the Hyundai Sonata joined the lineup. Prior to the introduction of the Hyundai brand for non-commercial vehicles, Hyundai passenger vehicles, light-duty cargo vans, and passenger vans were distributed by Chrysler de México, branded as Dodge.

=== South America ===
==== Brazil ====
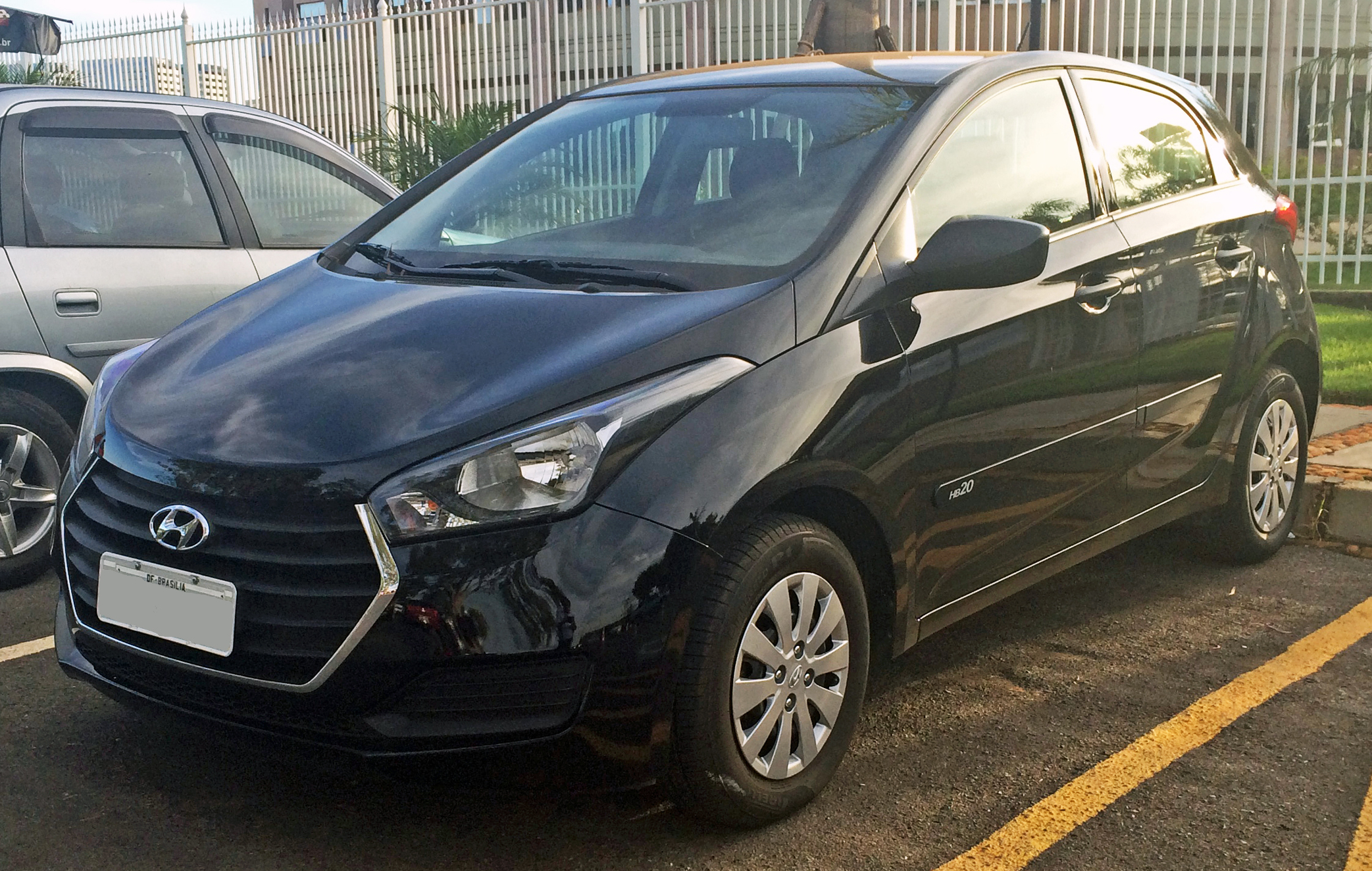
Hyundai HB20, the first model exclusively introduced for the Brazilian market. 'HB' in HB20 stands for Hyundai Brasil.

In October 2012, Hyundai launched a new small bi-fuel car, the HB20, designed specifically for the Brazilian mass-market. The car was developed under the "Projeto HB" (Hyundai Brazil) project, and is built at a new Hyundai factory in Brazil, located in Piracicaba, São Paulo. The plant is the first wholly owned Hyundai plant in Latin America. With an investment of around R$1.2 billion, the plant has the capacity to produce 180,000 cars per year under three shifts.

Hyundai vehicles have also been produced in Brazil by local partner, Caoa Group at a plant located in Anápolis, Goiás. Production here started with the HR model in 2007, and continued with the Tucson in 2010, the HD78 truck in 2011, and the ix35 in 2013.

=== Asia ===
==== China ====
Hyundai formed a 50-50 joint venture with Beijing Automotive Group since 2002 to produce cars in China. The joint venture is called Beijing Hyundai, which also manufactures several models which are exclusive to the Chinese market. It began operations in China by producing Sonata in December 2002. The joint venture sold 700,000 passenger cars in 2010, 855,995 car sales in 2012, and 2014 saw the company sell 1,120,000 vehicles. At its peak, the company had five plants: three located in Beijing, one in Hubei, and one in Chongqing.

Hyundai cars sold well in China until 2016, when sales fell by half because of its over-reliance on sedans, poor brand images and local Chinese automakers compete with price-competitive SUVs. It marked the start of a slump that continued into 2019, when the company announced plans to cut jobs in the region.

===== Hawtai partnership =====
Between 2002 and 2010, Hawtai Motor had produced Chinese-market versions of the Hyundai Matrix, the Hyundai Santa Fe and the Hyundai Terracan. The Santa Fe was the fifth most-purchased SUV in China in 2010, and some of Hawtai's versions may greatly differ from those sold in other markets. Hyundai ended its partnership with Hawtai in 2010.

===== Commercial vehicles =====
In October 2010, Hyundai signed an agreement with Sichuan Nanjun Automobile on setting up a commercial vehicle joint venture called Sichuan Hyundai Motor Co. Ltd.

==== India ====
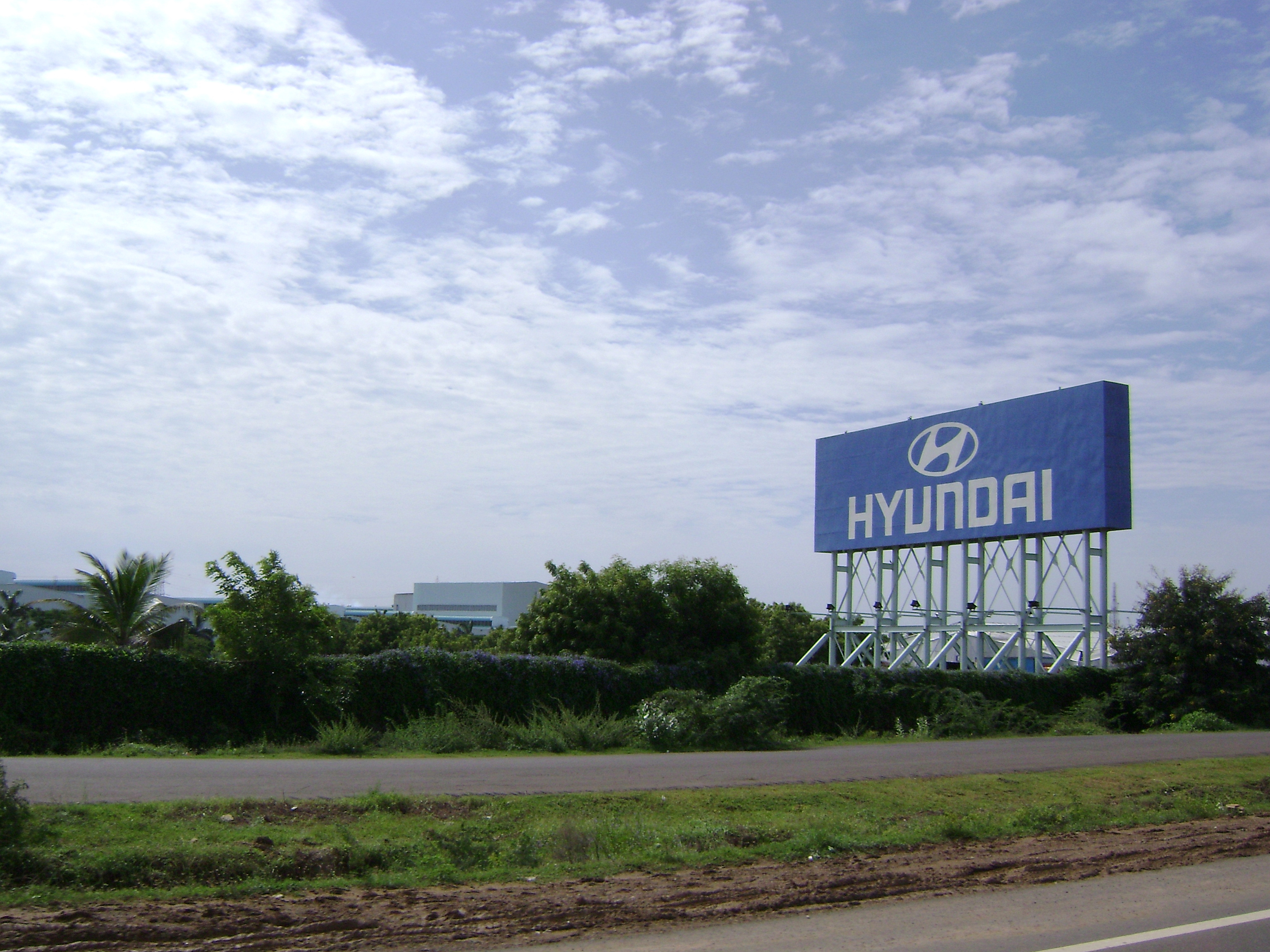
Hyundai's manufacturing plant at Irungattukottai near Chennai, India

Hyundai Motor India Limited (HMIL) was formed on 6 May 1996. During the entry of Hyundai in 1996, fellow South Korean Daewoo had entered the Indian automobile market just three years before, while Ford, Opel and Honda had entered less than a year back. Hyundai's first car in the country, the Hyundai Santro was launched on 23 September 1998 and was considered a success. It became the second best-selling car in the country from 2000.

Hyundai has two manufacturing plants in India located at Sriperumbudur in the Indian state of Tamil Nadu. Both plants have a combined annual capacity of 600,000 units. In the year 2007, Hyundai opened its R&D facility in Hyderabad, employing now nearly 450 engineers from different parts of the country. Hyundai Motor India Engineering (HMIE) gives technical & engineering support in vehicle development to Hyundai's main R&D centre in Namyang, Korea. Hyundai is currently the second largest auto exporter from India. It is making India the global manufacturing base for small cars.

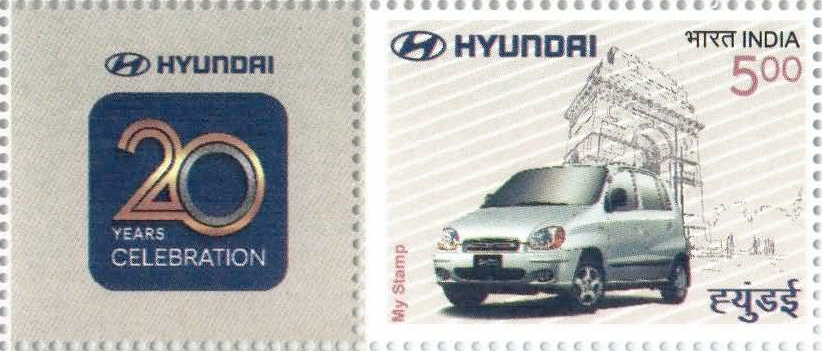
A stamp released to commemorate the 20th anniversary of Hyundai in India

In June 2017, The Competition Commission of India imposed ₹87 crore ($13.6 million) penalty for unfair business practices with respect to providing discounts for cars.

==== Bangladesh ====
Hyundai vehicles are assembled in Bangladesh with local partner, Fair Technology. Its manufacturing plant in Bangabandhu Hi-Tech Park was opened on 19 January 2023. The current focus is on importing completely knocked down (CKD) parts and assembling those in the facility. The plant is expected to manufacture 10,000 cars per year.

==== Japan ====
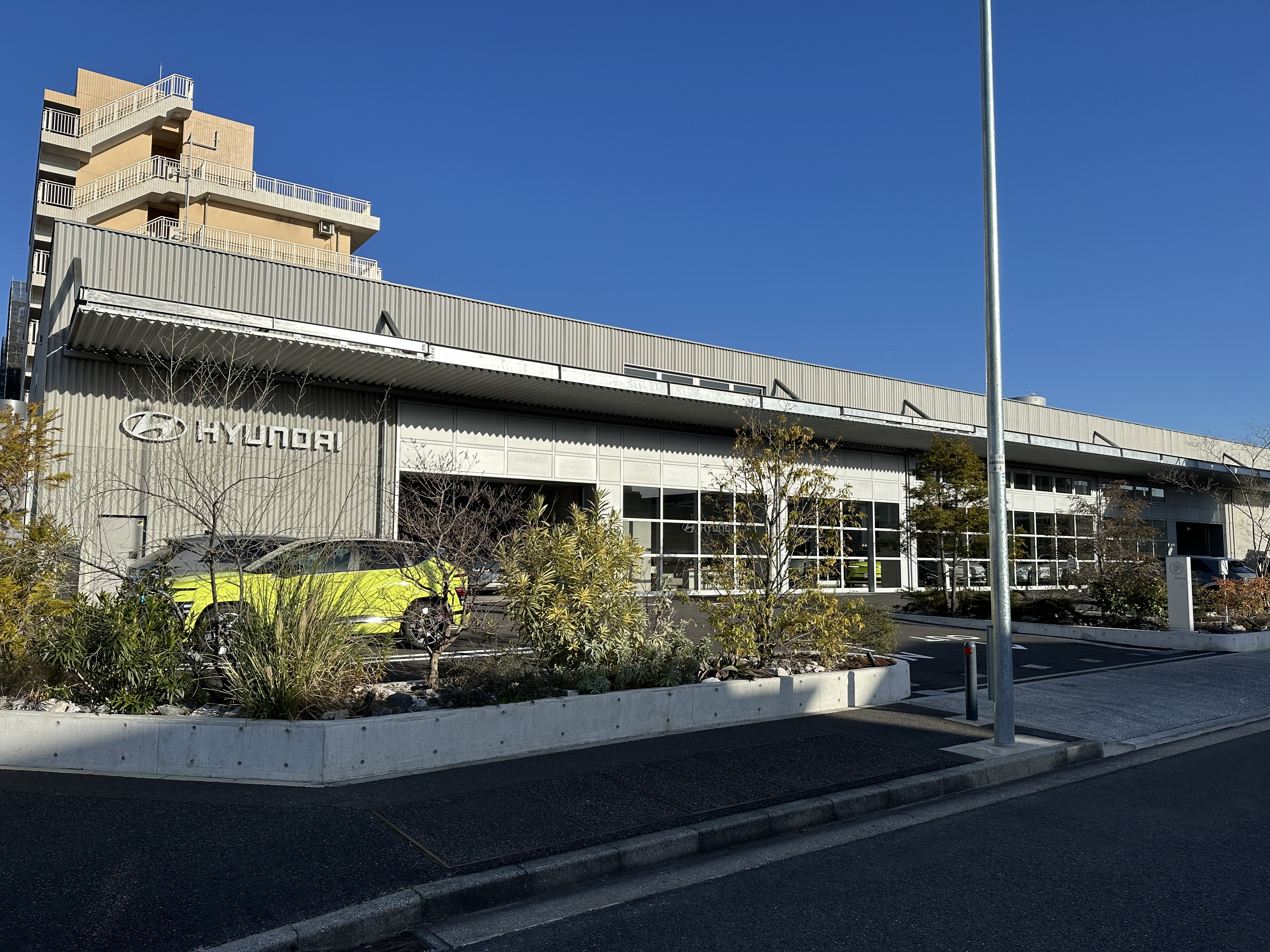
Hyundai Customer Experience Center in Yokohama, Japan

Hyundai started to market its vehicles in 2001. Despite having growing sales worldwide, Hyundai struggled in Japan, having sold only 15,095 passenger cars from 2001 to 2009. Following an announcement in November 2009, Hyundai pulled its passenger car division out of the Japanese market and focused on its commercial vehicle division instead.

According to the newspaper The Chosun Ilbo, the reason for Hyundai's failure in the car market was due to the company's inability to recognize the value of small cars due to parking spaces. For instance, actor Bae Yong-joon was hired to endorse the mid-sized Sonata in Japan to appeal to housewives who watched the drama Winter Sonata in 2003. In addition, the Sonata was priced too similarly to its Japanese rivals, which resulted in poor sales. The company said that it is possible for them to come back to Japan fully if market conditions continue to improve.

On 9 February 2022, Hyundai announced a comeback to Japan by marketing eco-friendly vehicles like the Ioniq 5 and Nexo with pre-orders from May 2022 for delivery beginning in July 2022 under the company name Hyundai Mobility Japan. As of 2022, Hyundai Mobility Japan operates an office and R&D center in Yokohoma. In addition, it only operates its sales through online means only.

==== Philippines ====
Hyundai first entered the Philippine market with the Hyundai Excel compact car and the Hyundai Grace van in the early 1990s, later introducing the Hyundai Starex and the second generation Hyundai Elantra towards the end of the decade. Hyundai Asia Resources, Inc. (HARI) was the distributor of Hyundai passenger cars and currently the official distributor of Hyundai commercial vehicles in the country. The company was appointed by Hyundai Motor Company of South Korea in August 2001 as the official distributor of Hyundai vehicles in the Philippines. In early 2022, Hyundai Motor Philippines, Inc. (HMPH) became the official distributor of Hyundai passenger cars in the country after the company took over its passenger car operations from HARI, It started its operations on 1 June 2022.

==== Indonesia ====
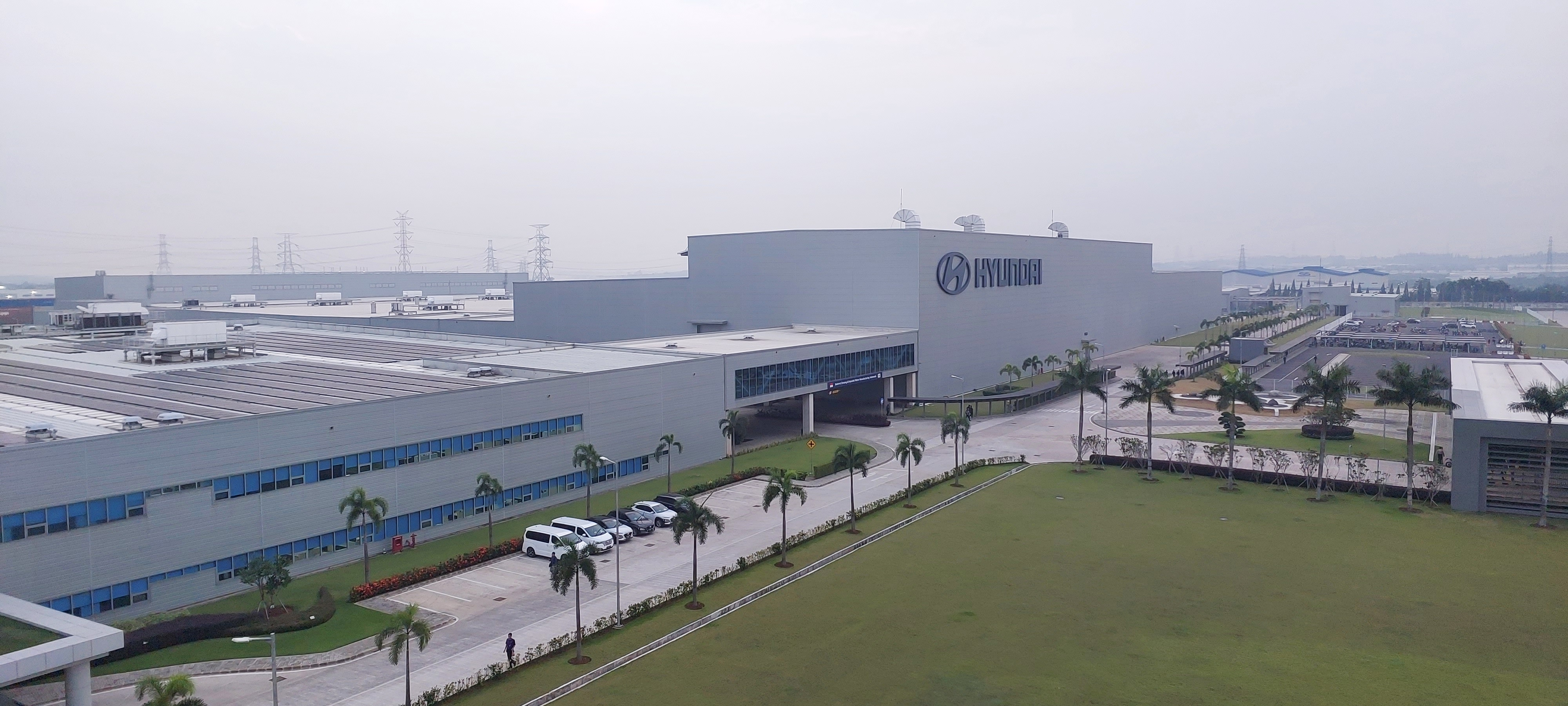
Hyundai Motor Manufacturing Indonesia, Hyundai's largest manufacturing plant in Southeast Asia

In November 2019, Hyundai announced that it is building the first wholly owned Southeast Asian car plant located in Indonesia. Known as Hyundai Motor Manufacturing Indonesia (HMMI), it is built in Cikarang, Bekasi and will fully operate in the second half of 2021 with the annual capacity of 150,000 vehicles. Half of the output would be exported to the neighbouring countries in Southeast Asia. A total of US$1.55 billion (Rp 21.7 trillion) would be invested to the plant along with the future product developments until 2030. HMMI would produce a region-specific compact MPV among other models.

==== Vietnam ====
In Vietnam, Hyundai operates as a joint venture with Thanh Cong Group, establishing Hyundai Thanh Cong Vietnam (HTV). According to the data of the Vietnam Association of Automobile Manufacturers (VAMA), Hyundai was the best-selling car brand in Vietnam in 2023 with 67,450 vehicles sold, followed by Toyota with 57,414 vehicles, and Kia with 40,773 vehicles.

==== Turkey ====
In September 1997, Hyundai opened a manufacturing plant in Turkey, located in İzmit, Kocaeli Province. The facility, named Hyundai Assan Otomotiv, was built as a 50-50% joint venture between the Hyundai Motor Company and the Kibar Holding of Turkey, the first stage investment raising to US$180 million. It currently has an annual production capacity of 125,000 units and it manufactured the Accent, the H-100, the Starex, the Matrix and since 2010, the i20. In May 2013, Hyundai Turkey Izmit plant capacity was increased to up to 200,000 units with 470 million Euro investment. The i10 and i20 were started to be produced in the plant.

==== Malaysia ====
In November 2024, it was reported that Hyundai Motor will be investing RM2.16 billion to set up a manufacturing plant in Kulim, Kedah. It is the largest investment by the South Korean automakers in the country to date. The plant is anticipated to produce 7 models within the space of 5 years and is scheduled to open for business in 2025.

Singapore

Hyundai Motor Group Innovation Centre Singapore HMGICS is Hyundai Motor Group’s open innovation hub to support research and development in advanced mobility ecosystems. The center aims to explore new business ideas and technologies.

=== Europe ===
==== Germany ====
Hyundai has been operating an R&D centre in Frankfurt, Germany since 1994, that has been responsible for monitoring technology developments in Europe and designing and engineering new cars for the European market. In September 2003, the company opened its new European headquarters in Rüsselsheim, after an investment worth 50 million euro. The site became the new location for the R&D centre and for the world rally team of the company.

==== Czech Republic ====
In November 2008, Hyundai opened its European plant in Nošovice, Czech Republic, following an investment of over 1 billion euros and over two years of construction. The plant, which mainly manufactures the i30, ix20, ix35 for the European market, has an annual capacity of 300,000 cars. The new Hyundai plant is 90 kilometres north of Kia Motors' Žilina Plant in Slovakia.

==== Russia ====
In Russia, the production of the Hyundai Accent, Sonata, Elantra and Santa Fe models has been taking place at the TagAZ plant, located in Taganrog, since 2001, in the form of complete knock-down kits assembly. Since 2006, the factory has also been assembling the Hyundai Porter, County, Aero Town and the HD 500 commercial vehicles. In June 2008, Hyundai started the construction of a new manufacturing plant in Saint Petersburg with a planned yearly capacity of 100,000 cars, that will eventually be increased to 200,000 units. It started mass production in January 2011, with two models: the Hyundai Solaris and the Kia Rio. In September 2021, Hyundai Wia division opened a car engine manufacturing plant in Saint Petersburg, the biggest in Russia and the fifth in the world. The new plant is designed to produce about 330.000 engines for Hyundai Solaris and Creta as well as for Kia Rio by the end of the year 2021. The construction of the plant began in December 2019. In 2022, the company's revenue amounted to 112 billion rubles. In January 2024 Hyundai sold its two plants in Russia, enabling the company to exit the Russian market at a cost of $214.7 million.

=== Africa ===
==== Southern Africa ====
In Botswana, the assembly of Hyundai Accent, Sonata, and Elantra models was undertaken by the Motor Company of Botswana at its Gaborone plant, since February 1993, in the form of complete knock-down kits. Almost all of the finished vehicles were exported across Botswana's border to South Africa, where the vast majority of dealerships are situated.

==== Egypt ====
Hyundai cars are also manufactured in Egypt, the local manufacturer is the Ghabbour Group, which is located in Cairo. They have a big model range and offers sports models of some car models which are only offered on the Egypt market. Formerly, the company had assembled vehicles such as the Verna.

== Product line ==
Hyundai produces sedans, hatchbacks, crossover SUVs, vans, pickups, heavy trucks and buses in numerous plants worldwide.

=== Cars ===
Best-selling Hyundai models in 2024
Rank	Model	Global sales
1	Tucson	634,297
2	Elantra / Avante / i30 Sedan	368,402
3	Creta/Alcazar	348,740
4	Kona/Kauai	285,233
5	Santa Fe	279,886
6	i10/Xcent/Aura	279,687
7	Venue	192,027
8	i20	169,013
9	Sonata	167,634
10	Palisade	165,745

Its top-selling sedan, according to the company's sales data in 2021 was the Elantra (Avante in South Korea), which recorded 380,907 units. This model was produced in several plants, including in South Korea, United States, China, among others. Another popular sedan model is the Accent/Verna, which is popular in emerging markets including China, India, Middle East, as well as developed markets like North America. This model ceased to be produced in South Korea in 2019, as its production base were moved to Mexico and India.

Other sedan models are the mid-size Sonata, executive Grandeur, and several China-oriented models which consist of Reina, Celesta, Lafesta, and Mistra.

Some hatchback models developed by Hyundai have been divided into models developed to cater to the Indian market and the European market. Both the i10 and i20 are models built in India and Europe, with several changes between the Indian and European versions to ensure the model could fit according to each market. Other hatchback models include the entry-level Santro first introduced in 1998 for the Indian market, i30 C-segment car for developed markets, the HB20 for the Brazilian market, and the hatchback version of Accent for markets outside India and Europe.

=== Crossovers/SUVs ===
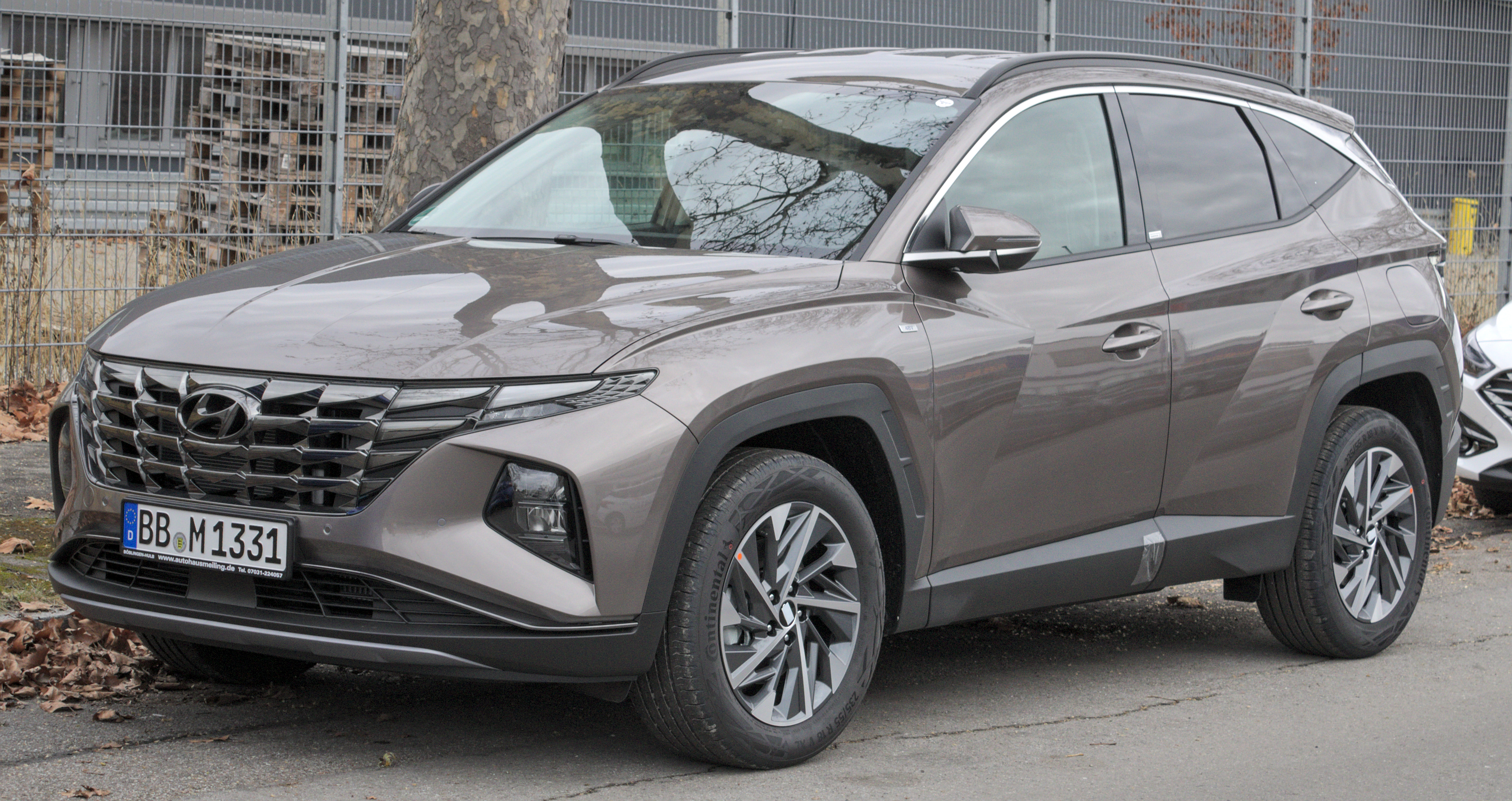
The Tucson is currently the best-selling Hyundai vehicle.

Hyundai entered the crossover SUV market early with the Santa Fe in 2000, followed by the smaller Tucson in 2004. The Santa Fe was a huge hit with American and European markets, despite receiving criticism in the past for Hyundai's obscure looks. It quickly became Hyundai's best seller and was one of the reasons Hyundai survived despite having its sales declined. As of 2020, Hyundai has sold more than 5,260,000 units of Santa Fe globally.

The first-generation Tucson shared its Elantra-based platform with the Kia Sportage. In most countries apart from South Korea and the United States, the Tucson was retired for the Hyundai ix35 from 2009 to 2015. However, the Tucson name was restored for the third generation, where it was to be used across all markets. It was unveiled at the Geneva Motor Show in 2015. The Tucson is the fourth best-selling SUV in the world in 2020, with a total sales of 451,703 units, below the Toyota RAV4, Honda CR-V, and Volkswagen Tiguan.

By mid-2010s, Hyundai moved into developing smaller crossover SUV models, starting from the Creta (ix25 in China) from 2014, and the Kona in 2017. The Kona is also consisted of a hybrid electric and a pure battery electric variant. By 2019, both model became the third and fourth-best selling vehicle of the brand, while the Creta has been the best-selling SUV in Russia since 2016, and India in 2020. In 2021, Hyundai released its first crossover SUV model in the South Korean light car segment, the Casper. It is the first venture of the brand in the segment in 15 years, and also the smallest automobile the brand produces of any kind.

Currently, Hyundai produces 12 crossover SUV models in different markets.

=== Hybrid and electric vehicles ===
Hyundai Motor Company began developing flexible-fuel vehicles (FFVs) in 1988. The test vehicle was 1991 MY Scoupe FFV. Since March 1992, in Seoul, Korea, through at least November 1993, field trials of several FFVs had been performed over more than 30,000 miles.

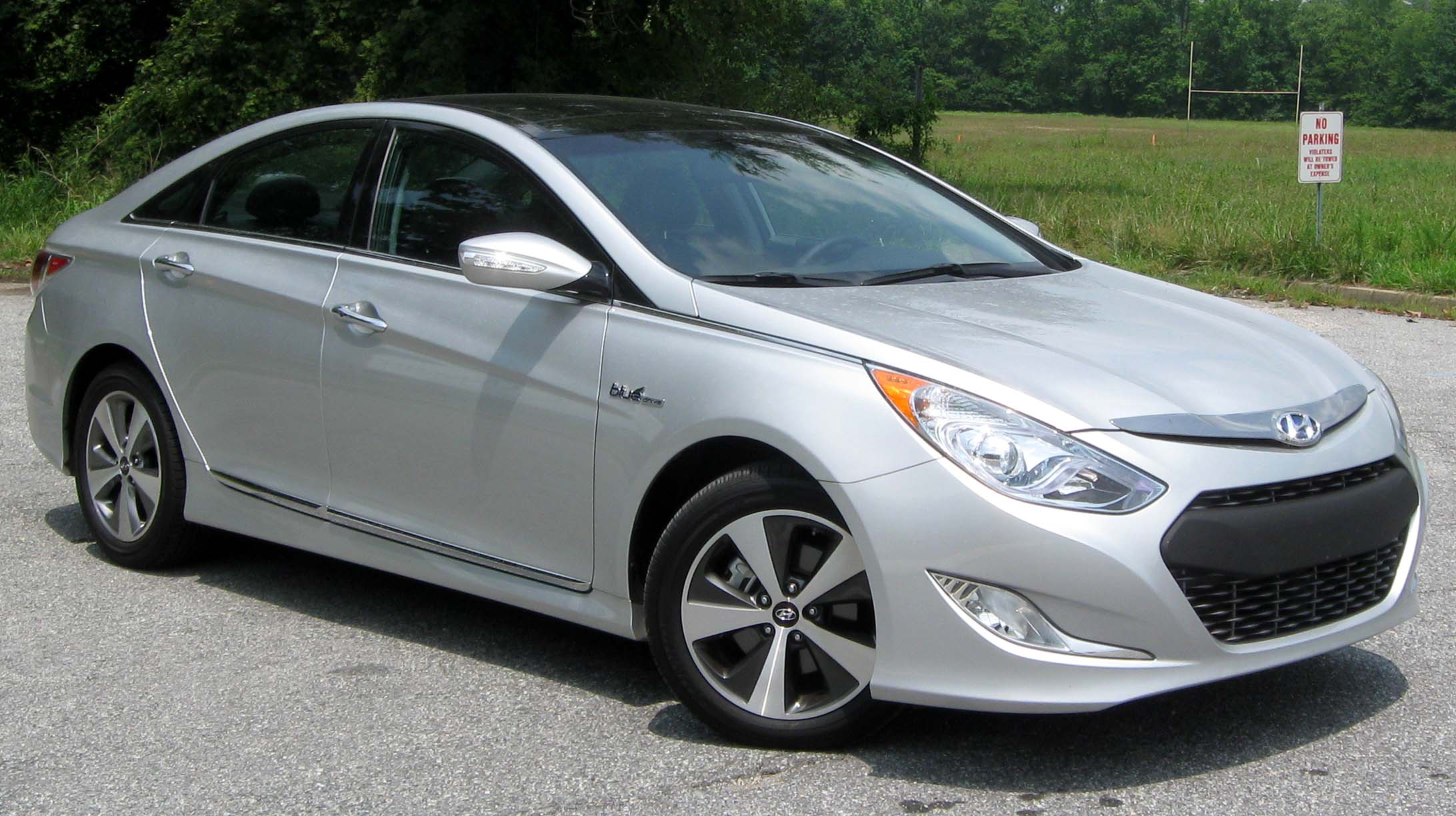
The Hyundai Sonata Hybrid uses a lightweight lithium polymer battery.

The new hybrid-electric FGV-1 was unveiled at the Seoul Motor Show in 1995 which featured full-time electric drive technology. The 1995 FGV-1 was the result of Hyundai's first experiments with hybrid propulsion systems in 1994. The FGV-2 was the second vehicle to be produced. The company is using the "parallel" type design, which utilizes either the internal combustion engine or the electric motor. Others are the Elantra HEV and the Hyundai Accent HEV, which were unveiled in 1999 and 2000, respectively.

The first pure electric car developed by Hyundai was the Sonata Electric Vehicle in 1991. The car started as a Sonata sedan-based model. Hyundai planned to have six electric vehicles available for testing by the end of 1992.

Hyundai began mass-producing hybrid electric vehicles in 2008. The company is using Hybrid Blue Drive, which includes lithium polymer batteries, as opposed to lithium-ion. The new hybrid Sonata made its debut at the Los Angeles International Auto Show in November 2008. The 2011 Sonata Hybrid sales in the U.S. began in February 2011.

In 2009, Hyundai released the Avante LPI Hybrid in the South Korean domestic market in July. Hyundai showcased also the Hyundai BlueOn, an electric prototype of i10, was first unveiled at the Frankfurt Motor Show in 2009. At the 2010 Geneva Motor Show, Hyundai unveiled the i-flow, a concept car using a variant of the BLUE-WILL hybrid system.

As of March 2014, cumulative global sales of hybrid models totaled 200,000 units, including both Hyundai Motors and Kia Motors hybrid models.

In 2016, Hyundai revealed the Ioniq five-door liftback to rival the Toyota Prius. The nameplate Ioniq is a portmanteau of ion and unique. It is the first automobile to be offered in hybrid, plug-in hybrid, and all-electric variants with no "standard" internal combustion engine only version. The hybrid variant launched in its home market in February 2016, followed by the electric model in July 2016. The plug-in hybrid version followed in February 2017.

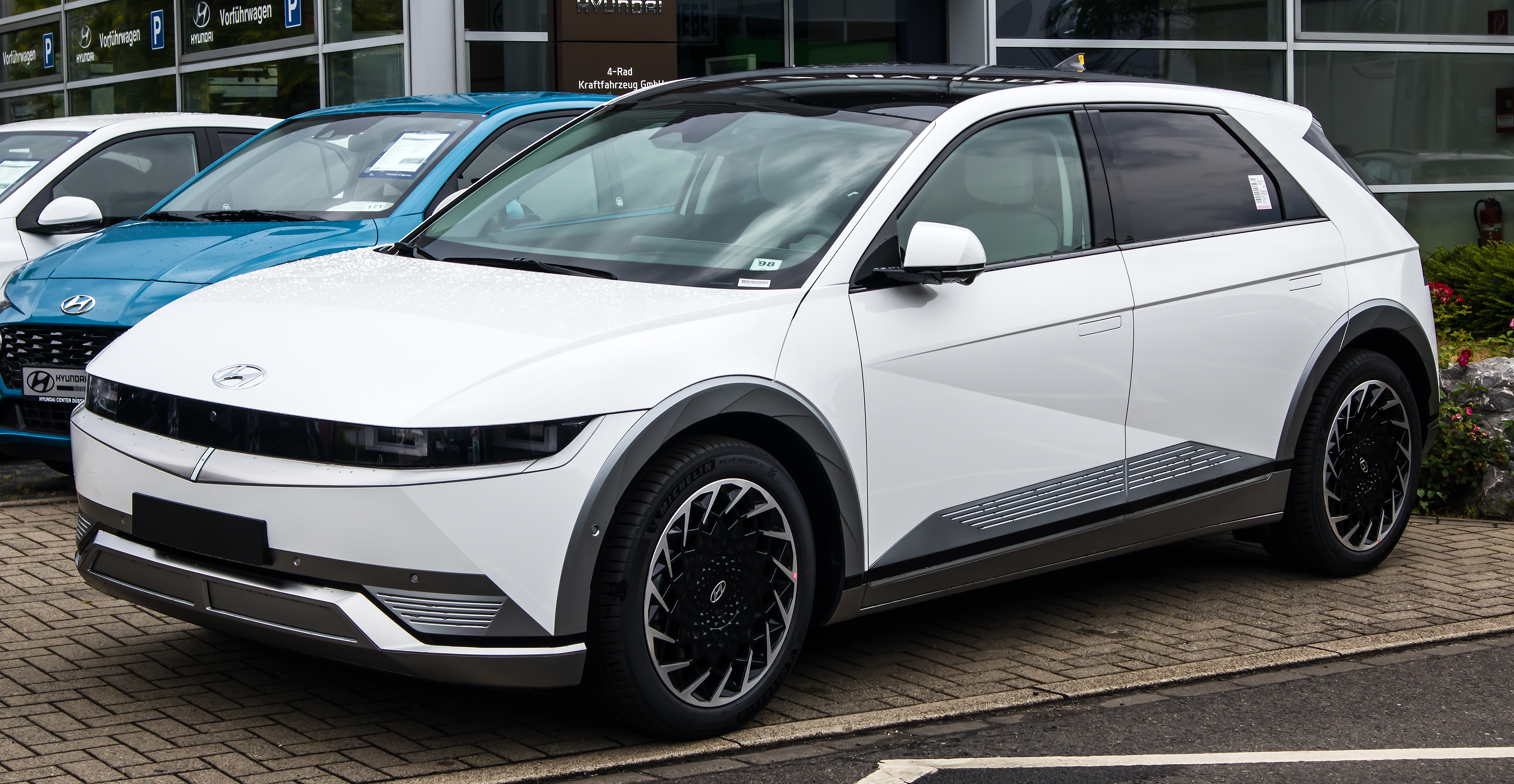
The Hyundai Ioniq 5 is the first Hyundai model developed on the E-GMP platform.

In August 2020, the company announced the launch of Ioniq as its own new electric brand and confirmed three new electric cars that will be sold under the sub-brand. Ioniq is Hyundai's second stand-alone brand after the Genesis. The new brand is going to utilise Hyundai's Electric Global Modular Platform (E-GMP), which it claims will enable "fast charging capability and plentiful driving range." Hyundai Motor Group's dedicated battery-electric vehicle platform, E-GMP, underpins models including the Ioniq 5, Ioniq 6 and Ioniq 9 and supports both 400-volt and 800-volt charging.

In December 2020, Hyundai Motor Group announced details about its E-GMP platform that will be the underpinning of new Hyundai and Kia electric vehicles starting in 2021. The platform's main components is a battery pack under the cabin and an all-in-one motor, transmission, and inverter designed and developed by Hyundai. By bundling the components, Hyundai said, it raised the maximum speed of the motor by up to 70 percent compared to existing motors, despite its small size. The company claimed that it is capable to handle power output up to 600 hp (608 PS; 447 kW) from the system.

In February 2021, Hyundai launched its first vehicle built on the E-GMP platform, the Ioniq 5, following the platform's detailed unveiling in December 2020. It is the first product to be marketed under the Ioniq sub-brand. At its introduction, it is the most advanced electric vehicle produced by Hyundai. Its battery can be charged from 10 to 80 percent in 18 minutes with its 800 V charging capabilities by using a 350-kW charger. A five minutes charge will add 100 km (62 mi) to its range by WLTP standards. Its claimed maximum range is 480 km (298 mi) for the rear-wheel-drive 72.6 kWh variant.

In July 2022, Hyundai announced its new automotive factory in South Korea, solely dedicated for electric vehicles and with production set to begin in 2025. It will be the first Hyundai plant to open in South Korea since 1996.

The Ioniq 5 was followed by the Ioniq 6 (2022; with a facelift unveiled in 2025) and the three-row flagship Ioniq 9, unveiled in Los Angeles ahead of the 2024 Los Angeles Auto Show and produced from 2025 at Hyundai Motor Group Metaplant America in Georgia. In 2025, Hyundai sold 961,812 electrified vehicles globally, including 275,669 EVs and 634,990 hybrids, a 27% year-on-year increase.

=== Hydrogen vehicles ===
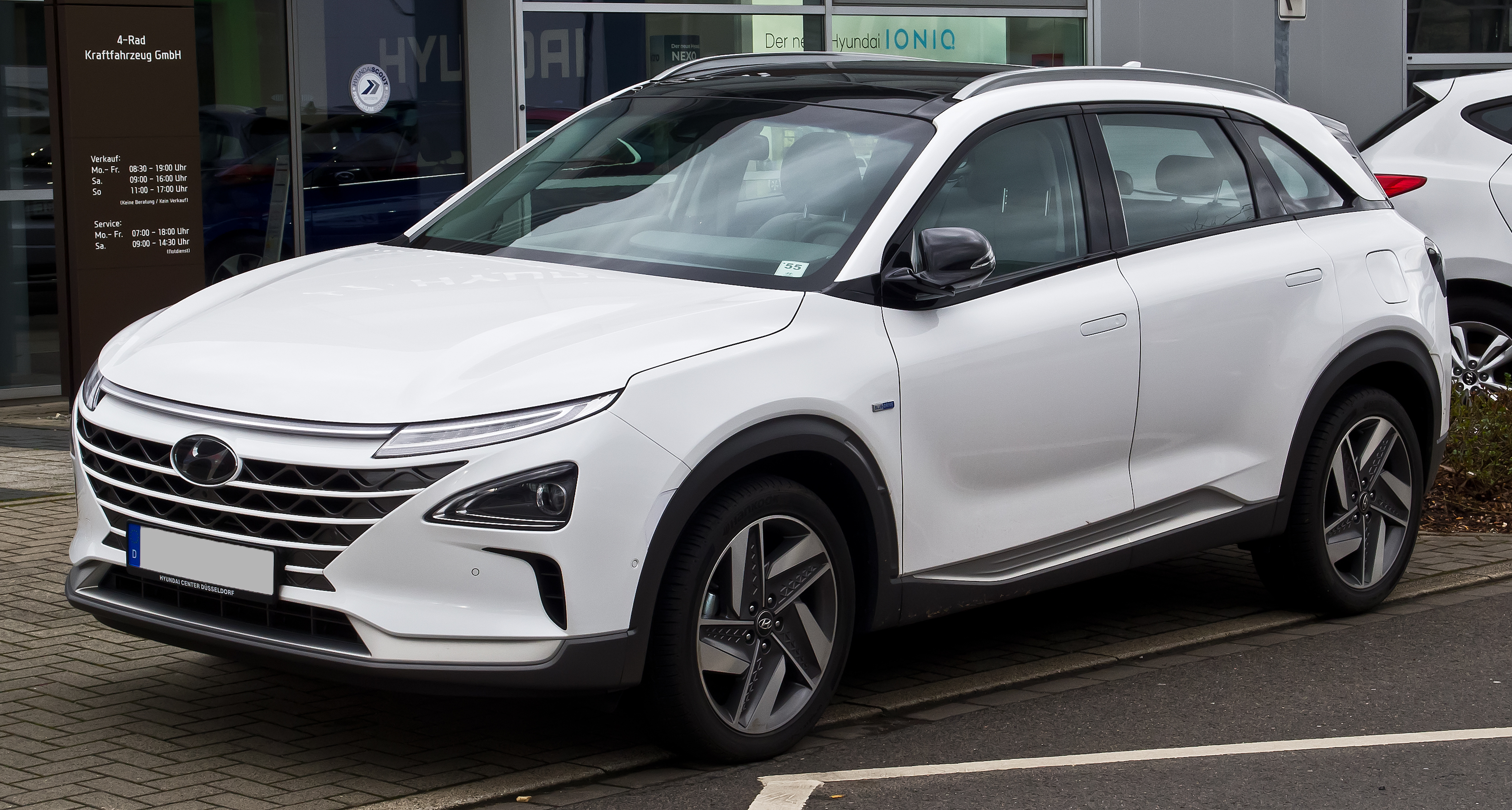
Hyundai Nexo

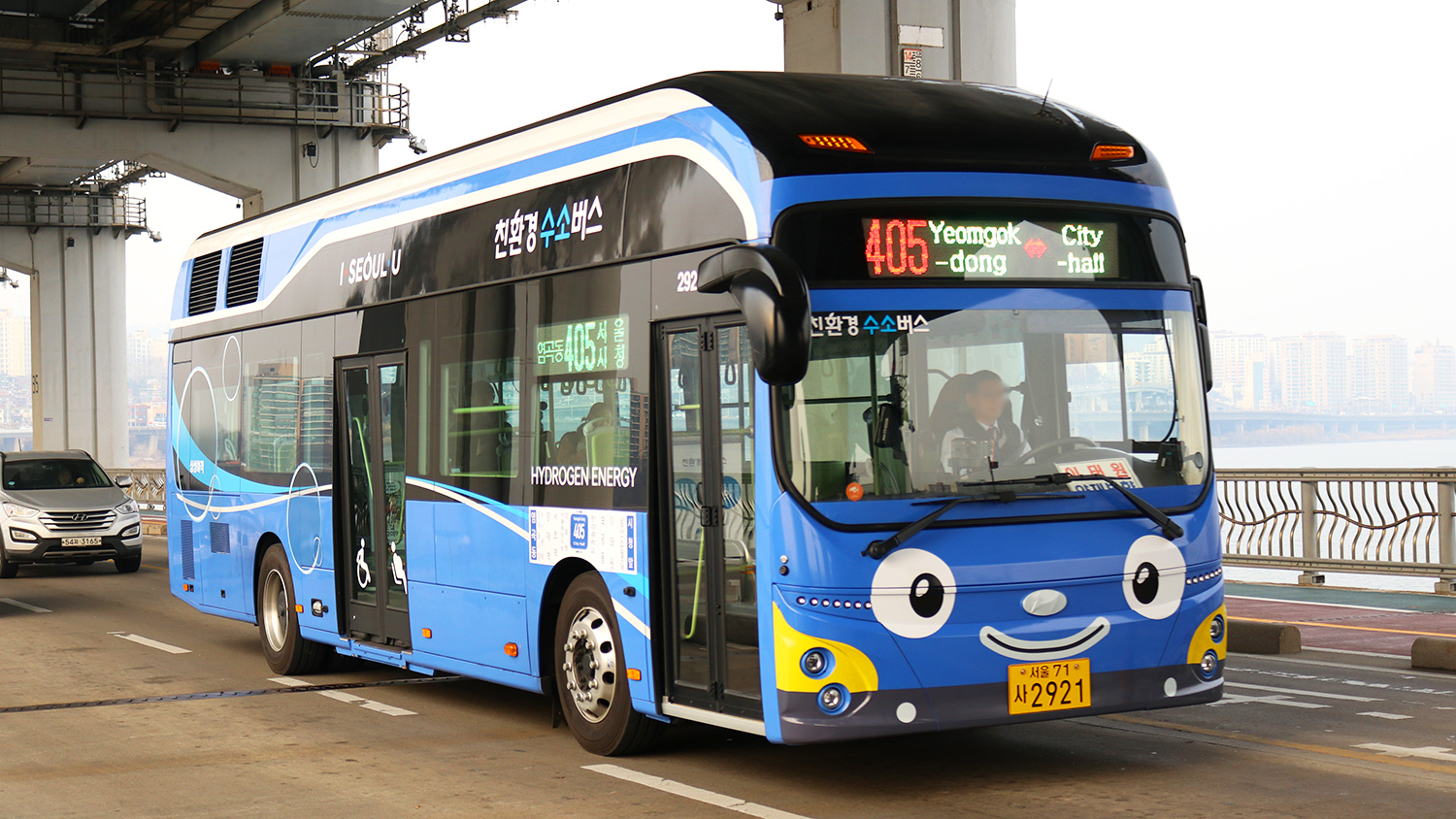
Hyundai Elec City FCEV

Hyundai has developed fuel-cell technology since 1998. In March 2018, Hyundai launched a hydrogen powered crossover SUV the Nexo. In October 2020, South Korean domestic sales of the Nexo exceeded 10,000 vehicles. As of July 2020, Hyundai had exported only 769 vehicles to the United States and Europe with supply limited due to domestic demand.

In 2020, Hyundai launched a hydrogen powered version of its Xcient truck the Xcient Fuel Cell delivering seven vehicles to customers in Switzerland. The Xcient Fuel Cell is the world's first production hydrogen fuel cell truck. In 2019, Hyundai formed Hyundai Hydrogen Mobility (HHM) together with Swiss company H2 Energy to lease trucks to Swiss customers with plans to deliver 50 trucks by 2020. Hyundai chose to launch in Switzerland as its road tax does not apply to zero-emission trucks and for its ability to produce hydrogen using hydropower. HHM formed a partnership with Hydrospider, a joint venture of H2Energy, Alpiq and Linde to produce hydrogen and to build hydrogen refuelling infrastructure in Switzerland. The 34-ton Xcient Fuel Cell has a 190 kW fuel cell supported by a 73 kW battery pack that stores energy from the fuel cell and from braking, seven hydrogen tanks, a maximum speed of 85 km/h (53 mph), a driving range of about 400 kilometres (250 mi) and a refueling time of between 8 and 20 minutes.

In 2020, Hyundai launched a hydrogen powered version of its Elec City bus the Elec City FCEV that has a capacity of 44 passengers with 24 seats and 20 standing seats. The bus has a 180 kW fuel cell supported by a 156 kW battery pack, five hydrogen tanks, a driving range of 434 kilometres (270 mi) and a refuelling time of 15 minutes. In 2020, Hyundai exported two buses to Saudi Arabian oil company Saudi Aramco for demonstration.

The second-generation Nexo was unveiled at the Seoul Mobility Show in April 2025, based on the Initium concept unveiled in October 2024 and the "Art of Steel" design language. In November 2025, Hyundai stated that the model had a projected WLTP range of 826 km and could be refueled in about five minutes.

=== Light commercial vehicles ===
Hyundai's light commercial range includes the Staria van/MPV, the Porter light truck (also offered with a battery-electric powertrain), and the Solati (H350) large van, sold in Turkey from 2015.

=== Trucks and buses ===
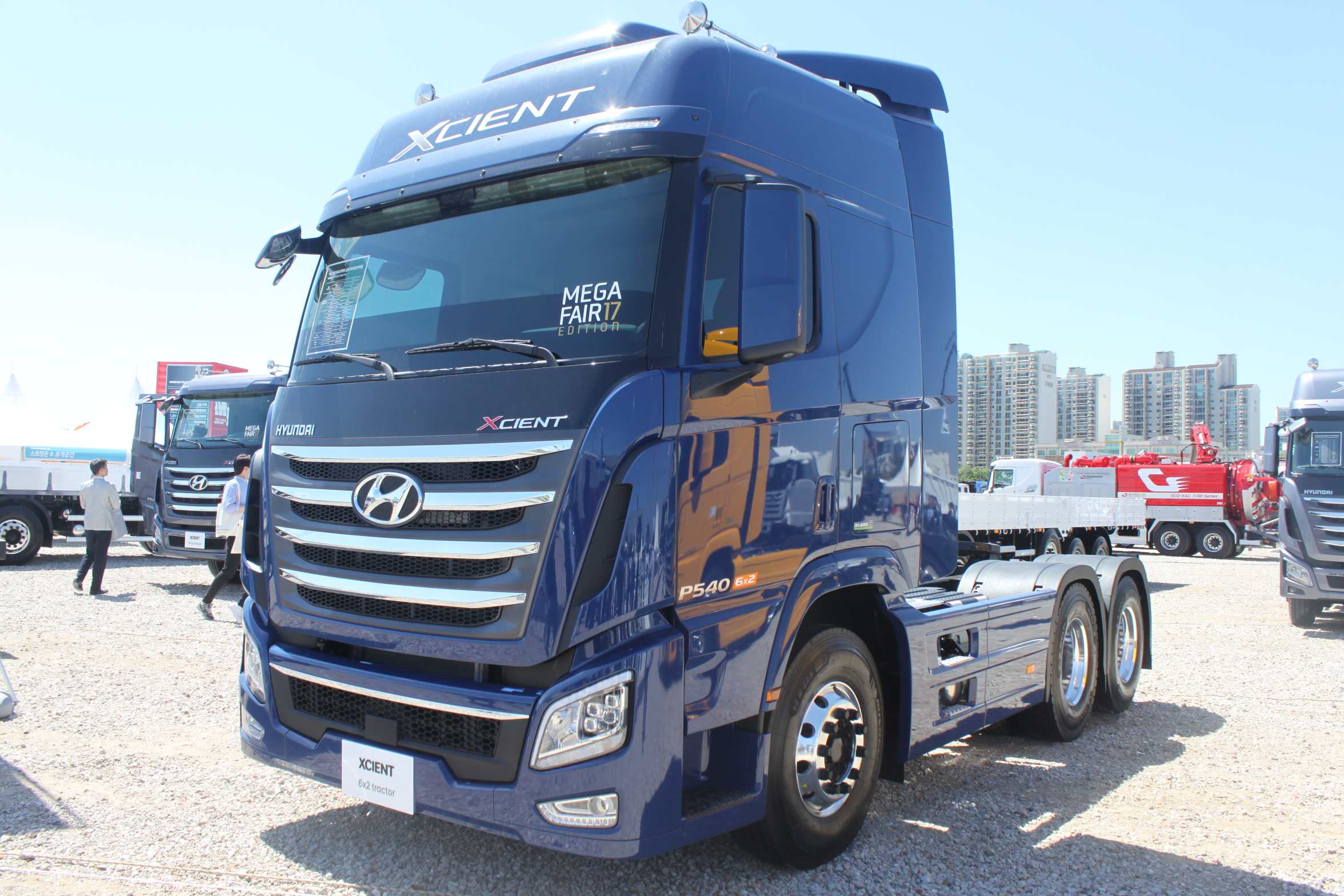
The Hyundai Xcient 6x2 truck

The Truck & Bus division produces heavy trucks including the Xcient (offered as a fuel-cell model), the Pavise heavy truck and the Mighty medium-duty truck, and buses such as the Universe coach and the all-electric Elec City.

A joint venture called the Daimler-Hyundai Truck Corporation was established between Hyundai and Daimler AG in 2000 to produce high-tech middle-range trucks and buses in the Korean market beginning in 2004. However, after numerous delays and disputes, the planned venture was cancelled in 2004, with DaimlerChrysler selling its 10.65 percent stake in Hyundai Motor.

At ACT Expo 2025, Hyundai and Plus AI unveiled an autonomous hydrogen-powered freight vehicle, combining Hyundai's XCIENT Fuel Cell truck technology with Plus' autonomous driving software, SuperDrive.

== Partnerships ==
In 2000, the company established a strategic alliance with DaimlerChrysler and severed its partnership with the Hyundai Group. In 2001, the Daimler-Hyundai Truck Corporation was formed. In 2004, however, DaimlerChrysler divested its interest in the company by selling its 10.5% stake for $900 million.

In February 2021, CNBC reported that Apple and Hyundai-Kia were close to finalizing a deal to build an autonomous Apple car. The vehicle was said to be completely designed by Apple and would be built in Hyundai or Kia plants; it could potentially have gone into production in 2024. However, Hyundai announced shortly after that it was no longer in talks with Apple.

== Heavy industries ==
Hyundai Rotem is a subsidiary, for manufacturing rolling stock, military equipment, and plant engineering.

Hyundai Translead manufactures semi-trailers, and heavy duty trucks for the North American market.

== Motorsport ==
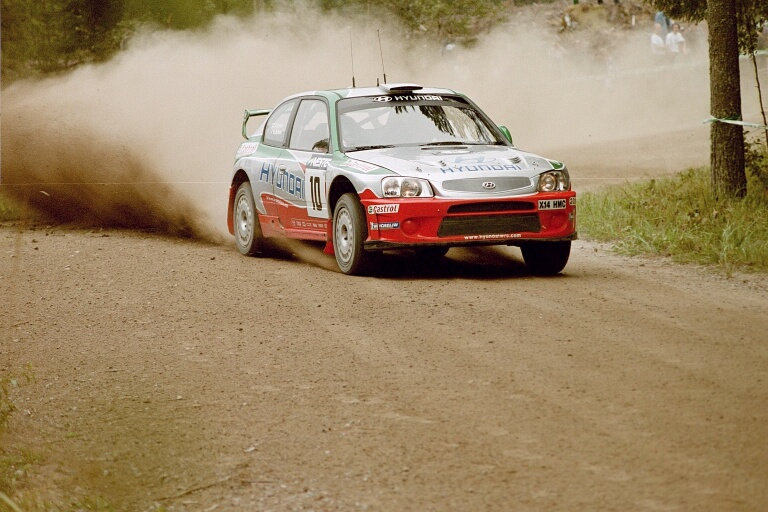
Alister McRae driving an Accent WRC at the 2001 Rally Finland

The Hyundai World Rally Team has competed in the World Rally Championship since 2000, and every season since 2014. For the 2002 World Rally Championship season, Hyundai hired the four-time world champion Juha Kankkunen, along with Freddy Loix and Armin Schwarz. Kankkunen's fifth place in New Zealand was the team's best result, but they managed to edge out Škoda and Mitsubishi by one point in the battle for fourth place in the manufacturers' world championship. In September 2003, after a season hampered by budget constraints, Hyundai announced withdrawal from the WRC and planned to return in 2006, which did not happen. The team returned to the series in 2014. In 2012, Hyundai Motorsport, based in Alzenau, was founded to manage Hyundai's global motorsport activities.

In 2006, following the announcement that Korea was scheduled to host a Formula One Grand Prix, Hyundai planned to enter the championship. The Korean Grand Prix was first held in 2010, but Hyundai did not enter.

== Marketing ==
=== Corporate social responsibility ===
In 2008, Hyundai Motors established a committee to oversee its Corporate Social Responsibility programme. Among the programme's initiatives have been the "Happy Move Global Youth Volunteers Program".

The Hyundai Motors' India Foundation (HMIF) has invested more than 20 million rupees in various corporate social responsibility programmes in India. In 2011, it started the "Go Green" village adoption project in Tamil Nadu. Its aim was to promote environmentally friendly products, increase the forest cover in Tamil Nadu, and improve living and hygiene conditions in the region's villages. A number of schools have been adopted for improvement with the HMIF donating around 450 benches to government schools and drilling 10 bore wells.

In 2020, Hyundai Motors signed a contract with UN Development Programme and launched a campaign 'for Tomorrow' in 2021 to create and realize a solution for problems that global society faces. In 2022, the documentary film 'for Tomorrow' was released which contains the main story of the 'for Tomorrow' project.

=== Sports sponsorship ===
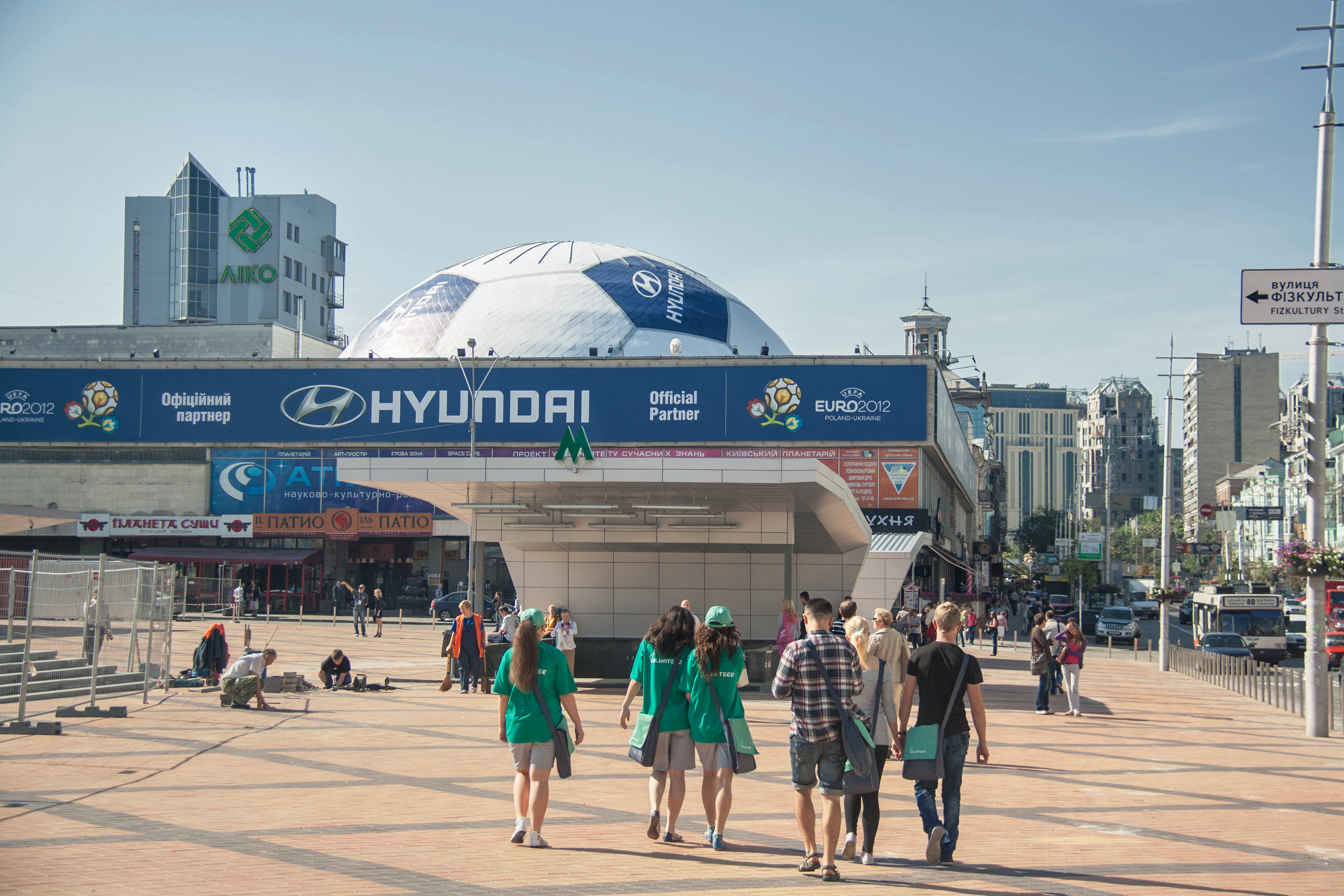
Hyundai as a UEFA Euro 2012 sponsor

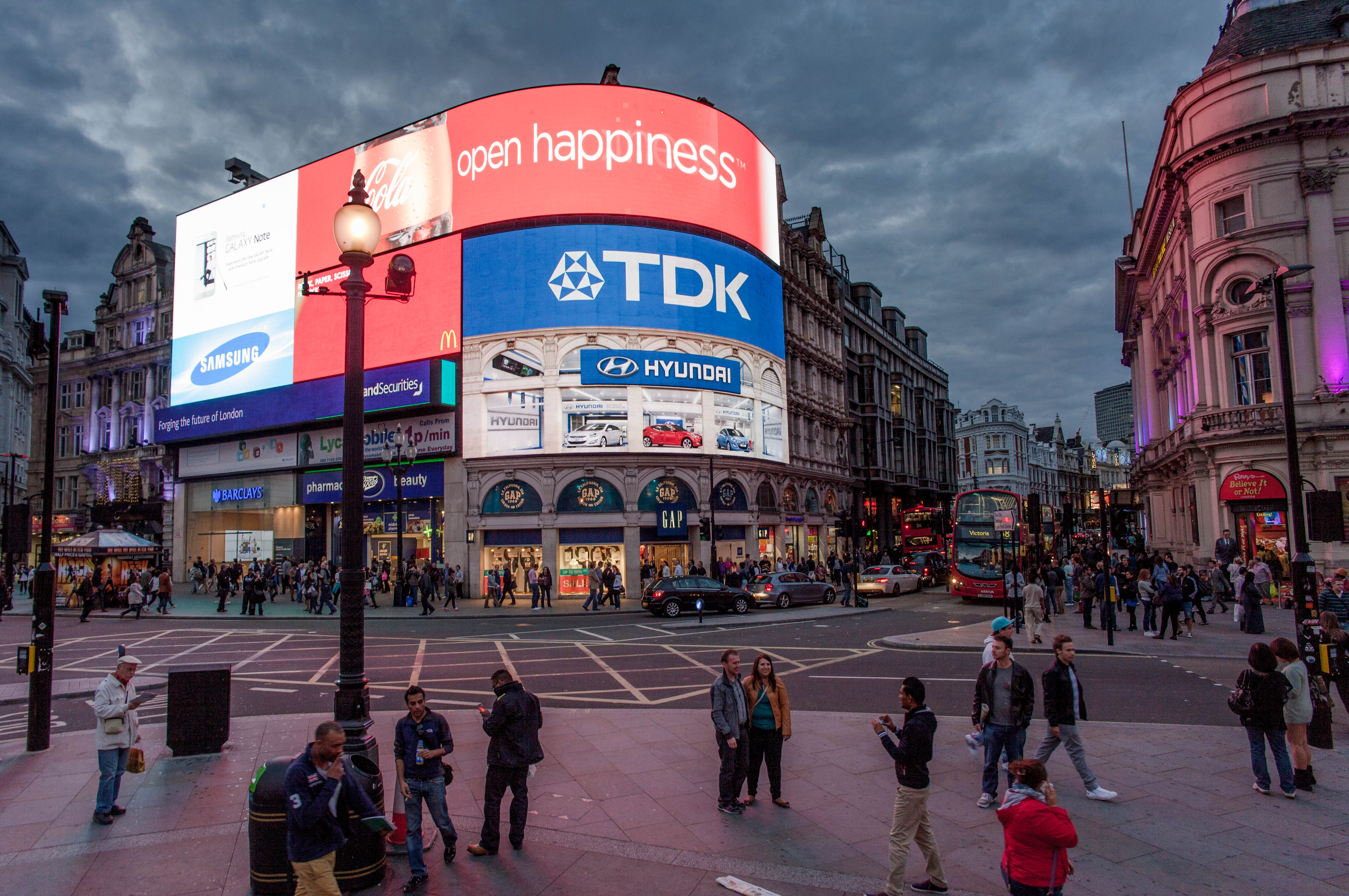
Hyundai in Piccadilly Circus Advertising

- BCCI
- Jeonbuk Hyundai Motors FC
- FIFA (Since 1999, except the FIFA Club World Cup)
- International Cricket Council
- UEFA (from 2000 to 2017)
- UEFA Champions League(Since 2026/2027)
- Cricket World Cup (Until 2015)
- Korea Football Association
- A-League
- Inside the NBA
- National Football League
- Sun Bowl
- Hyundai Tournament of Champions
- Olympique Lyonnais (from 2013 to 2020)
- PFC CSKA Moscow
- Millonarios Fútbol Club
- Club Universitario de Deportes
- Tampines Rovers FC
- Al-Fateh SC
- Moroka Swallows F.C.
- Mandurah City FC
- Park United FC
- Carlton Football Club
- Brisbane Lions
- Brisbane Broncos
- AS Cannes Volley-Ball
- Hyundai Hockey Helpers
- Rhys Millen
- Atlético Madrid
- Hertha BSC
- Chelsea FC
- AS Roma

=== Other sponsorships ===
- Academy Awards
- CNN Worldwide
- Hyundai Auto Club Philippines
- Country Calendar

== Board of directors ==
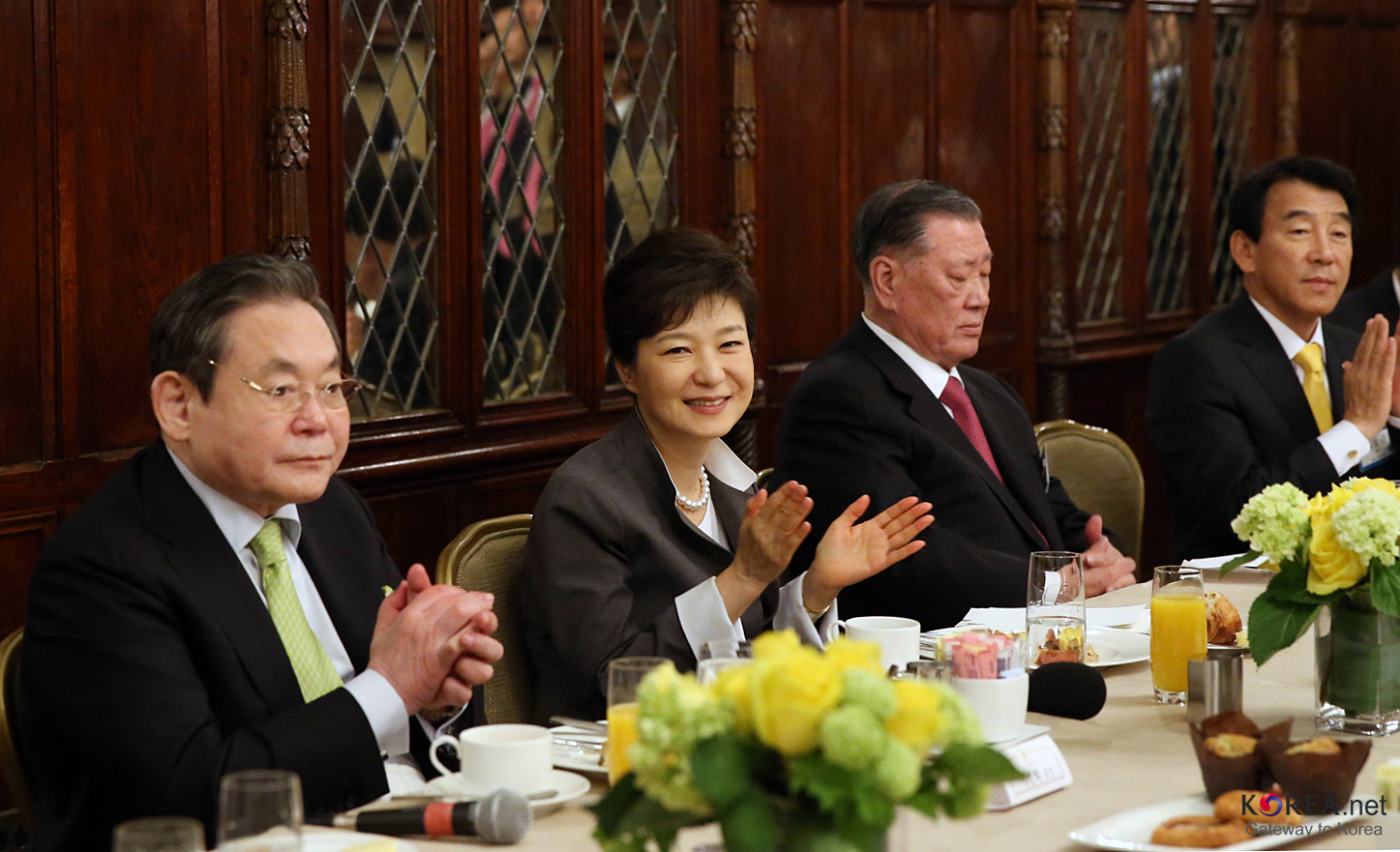
Hyundai Motor Group chairman Chung Mong Koo (right) sitting next to South Korean president Park Geun-hye in 2013

- Chung Eui-sun, Executive Chairman of Hyundai Motors
- Chang Jae-hoon, Vice Chairman of Hyundai Motor Group
- Lee Dong-seock, Vice President
- José Muñoz, President and Chief Executive Officer
- Gang Hyun-seo, Executive Vice President
- Yoon Chi-won, Former Chairman of EQONEX
- Eugene M. Ohr, Former Partner of Capital International, Inc.
- Sang Seung Yi, Professor of Economics of Seoul National University (Head of Department)
- Dal Hoon Shim, Representative of Woorin Tax Partners
- Lee Ji-yun, Professor of Department of Aerospace Engineering of KAIST
- Seung Wa Chang, Professor of Graduate Law School of Seoul National University
- Yoon Hee Choi, Professor of Graduate Law School of Konkuk University

=== Previous Chairmans ===
- Chung Ju-Yung (1967–1999)
- Chung Mong Koo (1999–2020) (Currently he is the brand's Honorary Chairman)

== Finances ==
The key trends for Hyundai Motor are (as of the financial year ending 31 December):

	Revenue (US$ bn)	EBIT (US$ bn)	Total assets (US$ bn)	Market cap (US$ bn)	Employees (k)
2015	80.0	7.6	141	39.4	
2016	81.4	6.6	148	34.4	
2017	86.3	4.2	167	41.1	
2018	88.0	2.6	162	25.7	69
2019	90.9	3.9	168	26.4	70
2020	89.5	2.1	193	40.2	72
2021	101.4	7.2	197	40.3	72
2022	109.6	8.9	203	27.7	
2023	123.6	14.0	218	36.9	74
2024	127.4	13.3	232	38.5	75

== Scandals and controversies ==
=== Inflated fuel economy numbers ===
After an investigation in 2012, the EPA found that 35% of all 2011–2013 Hyundai and Kia vehicles had inflated fuel economy numbers; by as much as six miles per gallon. Currently, Hyundai and Kia have started a reimbursement program for the owners of the 2011–2013 affected vehicles. In 2014 the company was issued $350 million in penalties by the US government, agreed to pay $395 million in 2013 to resolve claims from vehicles owners, and agreed to pay $41.2 million to cover the "investigative costs" of 33 US state attorneys general.

=== Wrongly advertised engine and horsepower ===
Several consumers complained that the engine delivered with the Hyundai Veloster in Brazil was inferior to the one advertised. Independent tests confirmed that it was not the same engine, and it delivered only 121 CV (119 hp) instead of the advertised 140 CV (140 hp), with the car earning derogatory nicknames like Slowster in the Brazilian market.

=== Marketing controversy ===
In April 2013, Hyundai Motors UK released a commercial depicting a man attempting to commit suicide via carbon monoxide poisoning in an ix35, only to fail to do so because of the vehicle's non-toxic emissions. The advert, produced by Hyundai's in-house agency Innocean Worldwide, received widespread criticism for promoting suicide. Hyundai has since taken down the video and issued a formal apology.

=== Vehicle security vulnerability ===
Since October 2022, following a TikTok trend, Hyundai vehicles especially in North America are highly targeted for theft due to their weaker security systems. Hyundai vehicles manufactured from 2016 to 2021 for the U.S. market that are not equipped with optional key fob and a push-button start mechanism lack immobilizers, a system that prevent the engine from being started unless a proper key is inserted. A video posted on TikTok depicted the theft process, which involves inserting a USB connector on a naked key slot and successfully starts a car. The vulnerability also affects vehicles produced by sister company Kia.

Hyundai and Kia acknowledged the vulnerability. Hyundai introduced a free anti-theft software patch starting 14 February 2023, with all eligible vehicles patched by 23 June 2023. Models that cannot be upgraded will have steering wheel lock reimbursements. Both companies also agreed to pay about $200 million to settle a U.S. class-action lawsuit, including up to $145 million for car owners' out-of-pocket losses. The settlement, announced on 18 May 2023, was rejected by a federal judge.

According to U.S. authority National Highway Traffic Safety Administration, the trend has led to eight fatalities in the country.

=== U.S. child labor allegations ===
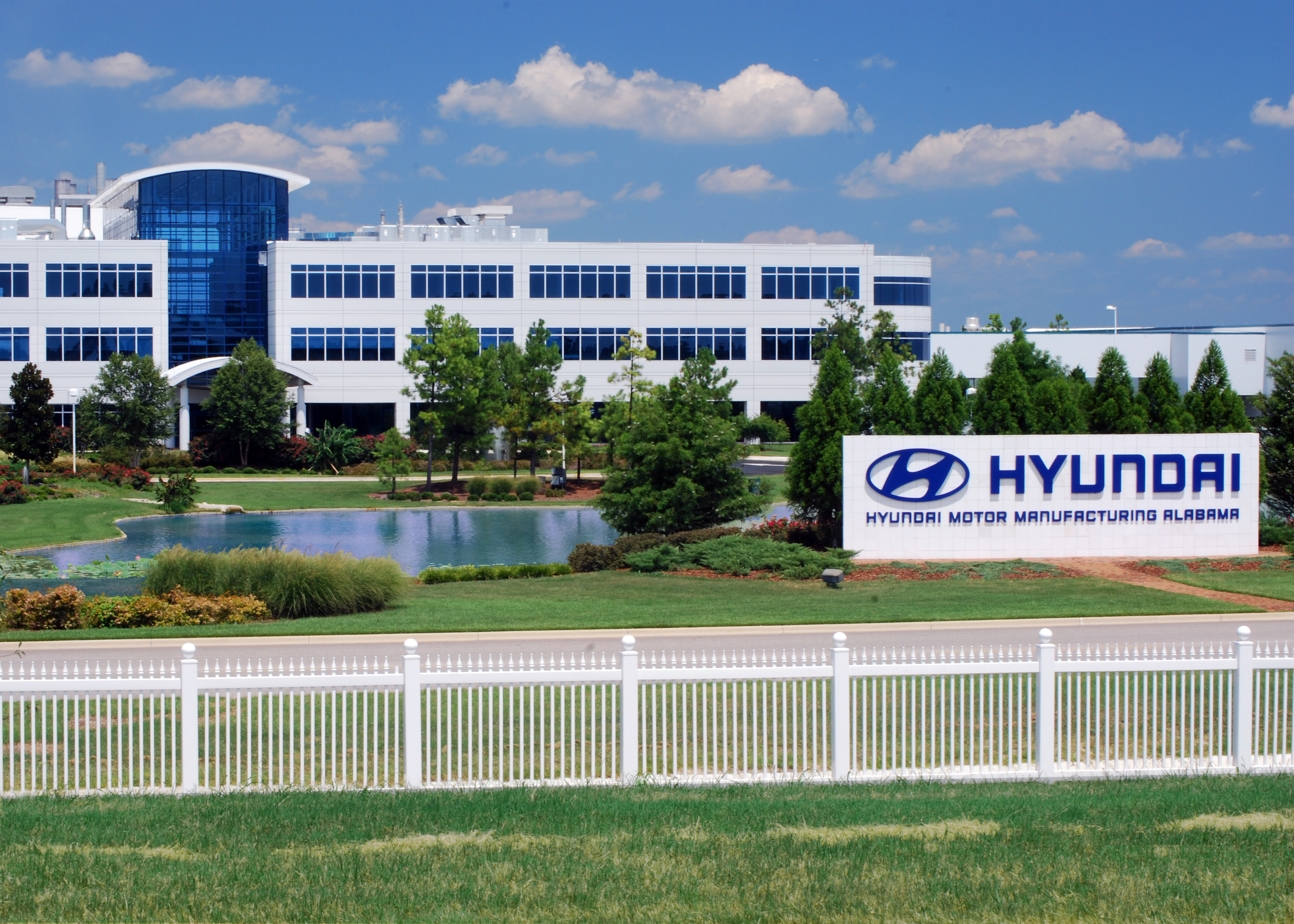
Hyundai Alabama child labor allegations HQ

In 2022, Hyundai and its parts suppliers in the U.S. were discovered to be illegally employing child labor, primarily involving refugees from Central America. This issue involved parts suppliers, including Hyundai subsidiaries Hyundai Glovis and SMART, SL, Hwashin, and AJIN, many of which used temporary work agencies to recruit underage workers. These suppliers hired minors, some as young as 12, to operate heavy machinery, in direct violation of child labor laws. Following a Reuters report in July 2022, investigations confirmed these illegal practices, leading to fines and sanctions against several suppliers. In response to the scandal, Hyundai announced plans to divest its controlling stake in SMART.

== Slogans ==
- New Thinking, New Possibilities (Worldwide)
- We make WAH (Canada)

=== United States ===
- Drive your way
- We make things better (2016-2019)
- Better drives us (2019)

== See also ==
- 2025 Georgia Hyundai plant immigration raid
- Bering Truck Corporation
- Hyundai Group
- Hyundai Mobis
- Hyundai Motor Group
- Kia Motors
- Hyundai and unions
- List of Hyundai engines
- List of Korean car makers
- List of Hyundai Motor Company transmissions
- List of Hyundai Motor Company manufacturing facilities
