= June 29 Declaration =

1987 speech by Roh Tae-woo

The June 29 Declaration (Korean: 6.29 선언; Hanja: 六二九宣言; RR: Yug-igu seoneon), officially titled the Special Declaration for Grand National Harmony and Progress Towards a Great Nation (Korean: 국민들의 민주화와 직선제 개헌요구를 받아들여 발표한 특별선언), was a speech by Roh Tae-woo, presidential candidate of the ruling Democratic Justice Party of South Korea, on 29 June 1987. In the declaration, Roh promised significant concessions to opponents of the incumbent authoritarian regime of Chun Doo-hwan who had been pressing for democracy. Roh went on to win the open presidential elections that were held that year, the first for at least the fifteen years since the October Yushin of 1972.

The question of the role of the June 29 Declaration is important in the historiography of South Korean democratization. According to proponents of the view that this was a "pacted" transition, achieved by calculated compromise by the ruling elite, the June 29 Declaration was the crucial turning point in the development of these calculations. "Pacted" transition theorists point to the authoritarian methods of Roh's subsequent regime, which continued the political manipulation and trasformismo of the Chun government, as evidence for the thesis that the June 29 Declaration was simply a tactic that enabled the perpetuation of authoritarian rule. "Mass" transition theorists, by contrast, believe that the Declaration was merely a response to the June Democracy Movement, and the democratization process was driven by the force of popular demand rather than elite bargaining.

The Declaration comprised eight points, in which Roh promised to:

- amend the constitution to provide for the direct election of the president;
- revise the presidential election law to ensure free candidature and genuinely competitive elections;
- grant amnesty to political prisoners, including Kim Dae-jung;
- protect human dignity and extend the right of habeas corpus;
- abolish the Basic Press Law and restore the freedom of the press;
- strengthen local and educational autonomy;
- move the political climate towards dialogue and compromise; and
- achieve substantial social reform.

The declaration began to be realized later that year with the promulgation of the constitution of the Sixth Republic of Korea in October.
