= Korean Metal Workers' Union =

South Korean labor union

- Founded: February, 2001
- Headquarters: Seoul, South Korea
- Location: South Korea
- Key people: Jeon Gyu-seok, president
- Affiliations: KCTU
- Website: kmwu.kr

Korean name
- Hangul: 전국금속노동조합
- Hanja: 全國金屬勞動組合
- RR: Jeonguk geumsok nodongjohap
- MR: Chŏn'guk kŭmsok nodongjohap

The Korean Metal Workers' Union (KMWU; Korean: 전국금속노동조합) is a labor union of metal workers in South Korea. The KMWU was founded in February, 2001 as part of the Korean Confederation of Trade Unions.
