= List of companies of South Korea =

Location of South Korea

South Korea is a sovereign state in East Asia, constituting the southern part of the Korean Peninsula. Highly urbanized at 92%, South Koreans lead a distinctive urban lifestyle; half of them live in high-rises concentrated in the Seoul Capital Area with 25 million residents and the world's sixth-leading global city with the fourth-largest economy and seventh-most sustainable city in the world.

Driven by a highly educated and skilled workforce, it has the world's eighth-highest median household income, the highest in Asia, and its singles in particular earn more than all G7 nations. Globally, it ranks highly in personal safety, job security, and healthcare quality, with the world's third-highest health adjusted life expectancy and fourth-most efficient healthcare system. It is the world's largest spender on R&D per GDP, leading the OECD in graduates in science and engineering and ranking third in the Youth Wellbeing Index. Home of Samsung, POSCO, LG and Hyundai-Kia, South Korea was named the world's most innovative country in the Bloomberg Innovation Index, ranking first in business R&D intensity and patents filed per GDP. As of 2014, it has the world's fastest Internet speed and highest smartphone ownership, ranking first in ICT Development, e-Government and 4G LTE coverage.

For further information on the types of business entities in this country and their abbreviations, see "Business entities in South Korea".

== Largest firms ==
This list shows firms in the Fortune Global 500, which ranks firms by total revenues reported before 1 February 2025. Only the top five firms (if available) are included as a sample.

Rank	Image	Name	2024 revenues (US$M)	Employees	Notes
31		Samsung	198,257	267,860	Multinational electronics conglomerate, and one of the world's largest information technology firms. Closely branded subsidiaries include Samsung Electronics, Samsung C&T Corporation, Samsung Electro-Mechanics, Samsung Heavy Industries, Samsung Life Insurance, and Samsung Fire & Marine Insurance
73		Hyundai Motor Company	124,577	73,502	Third-largest automotive manufacturer, including its Kia Motors and Genesis Motors brand divisions, and regional subsidiaries Hyundai Motor India Limited, Beijing Hyundai, Hyundai Motor America, and Hyundai Motor Europe GmbH
100		SK Group	101,969	114,950	Diversified conglomerate with more than 95 subsidiaries and affiliates, including SK Innovation (Energy), SK Telecom (telecommunications), SK Hynix (semiconductors), and SK C&C (consulting)
162		Kia	76,419	52,871	Multinational automobile manufacturer, 34% owned by Hyundai Motor
201		Korea Electric Power Corporation	66,977	48,696	Korea's largest electrical utility, majority-owned by the Korean state. The firm provides for generation, distribution, and major development projects.

== Notable firms ==
This list includes notable companies with primary headquarters located in the country. The industry and sector follow the Industry Classification Benchmark taxonomy. Organizations which have ceased operations are included and noted as defunct.

English	Korean	Group	Industry	Sector	Headquarters	Founded	Notes
5Rocks	-	-	Technology	Software	Seoul	2010	Mobile analytics
Aju Group	아주그룹	Aju Group	Conglomerates	-	Seoul	1960	Industrial conglomerate
AKOM	애이콤프로덕션	-	Consumer services	Media	Seoul	1985	Animation
Amorepacific Corporation	아모레퍼시픽	-	Consumer goods	Personal goods	Seoul	1945	Cosmetics
Asia Cement	아세아시멘트	-	Industrials	Cement	Seoul	1965	Cement
Asiana Airlines	아시아나항공	Kumho Asiana Group	Consumer services	Airlines	Seoul	1988	Airline
BC Card	비씨카드	KT Corporation	Financials	Financial services	Seoul	1982	Payment processor
Bexel	벡셀	SM Group	Industrials	Electronic & electrical equipment	Seoul	1978	Batteries
Binggrae	빙그레	-	Consumer goods	Food & beverage	Seoul	1967	Dairy
Busan Bank	부산은행	-	Financials	Banks	Busan	1967	Bank
Busan Transportation Corporation	부산교통공사	-	Industrials	Transportation services	Busan	2006	Transit authority
CAS Corporation	캐스	-	Industrials	Electronic & electrical equipment	Seoul	1983	Electronic scales
Celltrion	셀트리온	-	Industrials	Biopharmaceutical	Incheon	2002	Pharmaceutics (KRX: 068270)
Celltrion Entertainment	셀트리온 엔터테인먼트	-	Consumer services	Entertainment	Seoul	2012	Broadcasting
Channel A	채널에이	The Dong-a Ilbo Media Group	Consumer services	Media	Seoul	2011	Broadcasting
Cheil Industries	제일모직	Samsung	Industrials	Textile products	Seoul	1954	Merged with Samsung C&T, defunct 2014
Cheil Worldwide	제일기획	Samsung	Industrials	Advertising	Seoul	1954	Advertising & marketing
Chosun Broadcasting Company	주식회사조선방송	-	Consumer services	Media	Seoul	2011	Television broadcasting
CJ CGV	씨제이 씨지브이	CJ Group	Consumer services	Media	Seoul	1996	Theater chain
CJ E&M Film Division	CJ E&M 영화사업부문	CJ Group	Consumer services	Media	Seoul	1995	Film production
CJ Group	CJ그룹	CJ Group	Conglomerates	-	Seoul	1953	Holding company
Com2uS	컴투스	Gamevil	Technology	Software	Seoul	1998	Video games (KRX: 078340)
Cowon	코원시스템	-	Consumer goods	Consumer electronics	Seoul	1995	Consumer electronics
Crown Confectionery	크라운제과	Crown Confectionery	Consumer goods	Food & beverage	Seoul	1947	Confectionery
CT&T United	씨티엔티	-	Consumer goods	Automobiles	Seoul	2002	Electric vehicles
CU	씨유	-	Consumer services	Retail	Seoul	1990	Convenience stores
Cuckoo Electronics	쿠쿠전자	-	Consumer goods	Consumer electronics	Seoul	1978	Cooking appliances
Cyworld	싸이월드	SK Group	Technology	Internet	Seoul	1999	Social network
Daehan Tire	대한타이어	-	Consumer goods	Tires	Seoul	1990	Tires
Daewoong Pharmaceutical	대웅제약	-	Industrials	Biopharmaceutical	Seoul	1945	Pharmaceutics (KRX: 069620)
DL E&C	디엘이앤씨 주식회사	DL Group	Industrials	Construction & materials	Seoul	1962	Construction
DL Group	디엘 주식회사	DL Group	Conglomerates	-	Seoul	1939	Automotive, construction, industrials, oil and gas, financials
DASAN Networks	다산네트웍스	-	Telecommunications	Telecommunications equipment	Seoul	1993	Telecommunications equipment manufacturer
DI Corporation	디코퍼레이션	-	Technology	Semiconductors	Seoul	1955	Semiconductor testing equipment
DNA Motors	DNA 모터스	DL Group	Consumer goods	Automobiles	Changwon	1978	Motorcycles
Dohwa	술공사		Industrials	Construction & materials	Gangnam district	1957	Engineering design
DB Group	DB그룹	DB Group	Conglomerates	-	Seoul	1969	Steel, financials, chemicals, industrials
Dongkuk Steel	동국제강	-	Basic materials	Steel	Seoul	1954	Steel
Dongwon Industries	동원산업주식회사	-	Consumer goods	Food & beverage	Seoul	1969	Fishery
Doosan Enerbility	두산중공업	Doosan Group	Industrials	Industrial engineering	Changwon	1962	Heavy industrial construction, heavy machinery, power plants, generators, turbines
Doosan Engineering & Construction	두산건설	Doosan Group	Industrials	Construction & materials	Seoul	1960	Construction
Doosan Fuel Cell	두산퓨얼셀	Doosan Group	Industrials	Renewable energy	Iksan	2019	Fuel cell
Doosan Group	두산그룹	Doosan Group	Conglomerates	-	Seoul	1896	Energy, industrials, infrastructure, engineering
Doosan Robotics	두산로보틱스	Doosan Group	Industrials	Industrial engineering	Suwon	2015	Cobot, service robot
Eastar Jet	이스타 항공	-	Consumer services	Airlines	Seoul	2007	Low-cost airline
E-Land Group	이랜드그룹	E-Land Group	Conglomerates	-	Seoul	1980	Retail, travel & leisure
EcoPro	에코프로		Industrials	Electronic & electrical equipment	Seoul	1998	Batteries
ESA	주식회사 이에스에이	-	Technology	Software	Seoul	1994	Video games (KRX: 052190)
Eugene Basic Materials Company	유진기초소재	Eugene Group	Basic materials	Chemicals	Seoul	1999	Chemicals
Eugene Concrete	유진콘크리트	Eugene Group	Industrials	Cement	Seoul	1979	Cement, concrete
Eugene Group	유진그룹	Eugene Group	Conglomerates	-	Seoul	1954	Industrials, media, food & beverage
Eugene Koryeo Cement	고려시멘트	Eugene Group	Industrials	Cement	Gwangju	1962	Cement
EUKOR	유코어	-	Industrials	Marine transportation	Seoul	2002	Shipping line
Fila	휠라	-	Consumer goods	Recreational products	Seoul	1911	Sports goods, sportswear
Game Park	게임파크	-	Technology	Software	Seoul	1996	Video games, defunct 2007
Gamevil	게임빌	Gamevil	Technology	Software	Seoul	2000	Video games (KRX: 063080)
Genesis Motor	제네시스	Hyundai Motor Group	Consumer goods	Automobiles	Seoul	2015	Luxury vehicles
GM Korea	한국지엠	General Motors (USA)	Consumer goods	Automobiles	Incheon	1937	Automobile manufacturer
Gravity	그라비티	SoftBank Group (Japan)	Technology	Software	Seoul	2000	Video games (Nasdaq: GRVY)
Green Optics	그린광학	Hanwha	Technology	Semiconductors	Seoul	1997	Optics, semiconductors
GS Caltex	GS칼텍스	GS Group; Chevron Corporation (USA)	Oil & gas	Oil & gas exploration & production	Seoul	1967	Petroleum products, chemicals
GS Group	지에스홀딩스	GS Group	Conglomerates	-	Seoul	2005	Petroleum, retail, construction, sports
Haitai	해태제과식품	Crown Confectionery	Consumer goods	Food & beverage	Seoul	1945	Instant foods
HL Group	한라그룹	HL Group	Conglomerates	-	Seoul	1962	Automotive, construction, financials
HMM	에이치엠엠	Hyundai Group	Industrials	Marine transportation	Seoul	1976	Shipping line
Hana Financial Group	하나금융그룹	-	Financials	Financial services	Seoul	1971	financial services
Hanjin	한진 그룹	Hanjin	Conglomerates	-	Seoul	1945	Airlines, tourism, travel
Hanjin Shipping	한진 해운	Hanjin	Industrials	Marine transportation	Seoul	1977	Defunct 2017
Hankook Ilbo	한국일보	-	Consumer services	Publishing	Seoul	1954	Publishing
Hankook	한국타이어	-	Consumer goods	Tires	Seoul	1941	Tires
Hansol	한솔	Hansol	Conglomerates	-	Seoul	1965	Construction, chemicals, telecom
Hanwha	한화그룹	Hanwha	Conglomerates	-	Seoul	1952	Aerospace, industrials, chemicals, defense, financials, petroleum
Hanwha Aerospace	한화에어로스페이스	Hanwha	Industrials	Aerospace & defense	Seoul	1977	Aircraft parts & accessories, electronics, engines, rockets, military vehicles
Hanwha Life Insurance	한화생명	Hanwha	Financials	Insurance	Seoul	1946	Life insurance
Hanwha Ocean	한화오션	Hanwha	Industrials	Industrial engineering	Geoje	1978	Shipyard
Hanwha Total	한화토탈	Hanwha; TotalEnergies (France)	Oil & gas	Oil & gas exploration & production	Seoul	2003	Petroleum products, chemicals
Hanwha Vision	한화비전	Hanwha	Industrials	Electronic & electrical equipment	Seongnam	1977	Opto electronics, surveillance systems
HCT Co., Ltd.	에이치시티	-	Technology	Semiconductors	Icheon	2000	Semiconductor, testing equipment
HDC Hyundai Development Company	HDC현대산업개발	Hyundai Group	Industrials	Real estate	Seoul	2018	
Hite Brewery	하이트맥주	Hite Brewery	Consumer goods	Brewers	Seoul	1933	Brewery (KRX: 103150)
HiteJinro	하이트진로	Hite Brewery	Consumer goods	Brewers	Seoul	1924	Distillery
Hotel Shilla	신라호텔	Samsung	Consumer services	Travel & leisure	Seoul	1979	Hotels
Humax	휴맥스	-	Telecommunications	Telecommunications equipment	Seoul	1989	Broadband equipment manufacturer
Hybe Corporation	주식회사 HYBE	-	Consumer services	Media	Seoul	2005	Record label
Hyosung	효성그룹	Hyosung	Conglomerates	-	Seoul	1966	Chemical, industrials, construction
Hyundai Amco	엠코건설	Hyundai Motor Group	Industrials	Construction & materials	Seoul	2002	Construction and materials
Hyundai Asan	현대아산	Hyundai Group	Industrials	Real estate	Goseong	1998	Development
Hyundai Capital	현대캐피탈	Hyundai Motor Group	Financials	Financial services	Seoul	1993	Financial services
Hyundai Corporation	현대종합상사	Hyundai Heavy Industries Group	Industrials	General industries	Seoul	1976	Trading, logistics
Hyundai Department Store Group	현대백화점그룹	Hyundai Group	Consumer services	Retail	Seoul	1971	Retail holding company
Hyundai Engineering & Construction	현대 건설	Hyundai Motor Group	Industrials	Construction & materials	Seoul	1947	Construction and engineering
Hyundai Glovis	현대글로비스 주식회사	Hyundai Motor Group	Industrials	Delivery services	Seoul	2001	Logistics
Hyundai Group	현대	Hyundai Group	Conglomerates	-	Seoul	1947	Construction, transportation, power
Hyundai Heavy Industries Group	현대중공업그룹	Hyundai Heavy Industries Group	Conglomerates	-	Ulsan	1972	Industrials, construction, defense, transportation, oil & gas
HD Hyundai Heavy Industries	현대중공업 (주)	Hyundai Heavy Industries Group	Industrials	Industrial engineering	Ulsan	1972	Shipyard, engine & heavy machinery manufacturer
Hyundai IHL	현대	Hyundai Motor Group	Consumer goods	Auto parts	Seoul	1993	Parts and services
Hyundai Marine & Fire Insurance	현대해상화재보험 주식회사	Hyundai Group	Financials	Insurance	Seoul	1955	General insurance
Hyundai Mobis	현대모비스 주식회사	Hyundai Motor Group	Consumer goods	Auto parts	Seoul	1977	Parts and services
Hyundai Motor Company	현대자동차	Hyundai Motor Group	Consumer goods	Automobiles	Seoul	1967	Automobile manufacturer
Hyundai Motor Group	현대자동차그룹	Hyundai Motor Group	Conglomerates	-	Seoul	2000	Holding group
Hyundai Oilbank	현대오일뱅크	Hyundai Heavy Industries Group	Oil & gas	Oil & gas exploration & production	Seoul	1964	Petroleum products
Hyundai Rotem	현대로템 주식회사	Hyundai Motor Group	Industrials	Industrial engineering	Seoul	1999	Defense, military vehicles, railway vehicles, plant engineering
Hyundai Samho Heavy Industries	현대삼호중공업	Hyundai Heavy Industries Group	Industrials	Industrial engineering	Yeongam	1998	Shipyard
Hyundai Sungwoo Holdings	현대성우홀딩스(주)	Hyundai Group	Consumer goods	Auto parts	Seoul	1987	Parts and services
Hyundai Steel	현대제철	Hyundai Motor Group	Basic materials	Steel	Incheon	1953	Steel
Hyundai WIA	현대위아	Hyundai Motor Group	Industrials	Industrial engineering	Changwon	1976	Defense, military vehicles, automotive
Iconix Entertainment	㈜아이코닉스	-	Consumer services	Media	Seoul	1996	Media company
IDIS	주식회사 아이디스	IDIS Holdings	Technology	Electronic & electrical equipment	Yuseong District	1997	Video surveillance
Iljin Group	일진홀딩스 주식회사	Iljin Group	Conglomerates	-	Seoul	1968	Industrial conglomerate
INCA Internet	잉카인터넷	-	Technology	Software	Seoul	2000	Software
Industrial Bank of Korea	기업은행	-	Financials	Banks	Seoul	1961	Bank (KRX: 024110)
Innospace	이노스페이스	-	Industrial	Aerospace	Sejong	2017	Rocket (KRX: 462350)
iRiver	아이리버	SK Group	Consumer goods	Consumer electronics	Seoul	1999	Digital audio & video equipment manufacturer
Isu Group	이수 그룹	Isu Group	Conglomerates	-	Seoul	1996	Chemical, financials, oil & gas
Jeju Air	제주항공	-	Consumer services	Airlines	Jeju City	2005	Airline
Jin Air	진에어	Hanjin	Consumer services	Airlines	Seoul	2008	Airline
Jinwoo SMC	진우에스엠씨	-	Industrials	Electronic & electrical equipment	Muju	1998	Aerial work platforms
JoongAng Ilbo	중앙일보	-	Consumer services	Publishing	Seoul	1965	Publishing
JTBC	제이티비씨	-	Consumer services	Media	Seoul	2011	Broadcasting
Jungheung Group	중흥그룹	Jungheung Group	Industrials	Construction & materials	Seoul	1983	Construction
JYP Entertainment	JYP 엔터테인먼트 or 제이와이피엔터테인먼트	-	Consumer services	Media	Seoul	1997	Record label
Kakao	카카오	-	Technology	Internet	Jeju City	2014	Internet conglomerate
KB Kookmin Bank	KB국민은행	-	Financials	Banks	Seoul	1963	Bank
KCC Corporation	주식회사 케이씨씨	-	Basic materials	Chemicals	Seoul	1958	Chemicals
KG Group	KG그룹	KG Group	Conglomerates	-	Seoul	2003	Automobiles, steel, financials, chemicals, industrials, media
KG Mobility	케이지모빌리티 주식회사	KG Group	Consumer goods	Automobiles	Seoul	1954	Automobile manufacturer
KG Steel	KG스틸 주식회사	KG Group	Basic materials	Steel	Seoul	1982	Steel
Kia Motors	기아자동차	-	Consumer goods	Automobiles	Seoul	1944	Automobile manufacturer, defense, military vehicles
Kolon Industries	코오롱인더스트리	-	Basic materials	Chemicals	Seoul	1957	Polyester and nylon
Korea Aerospace Industries	한국항공우주산업	-	Industrials	Aerospace & defense	Seoul	1999	Aircraft manufacturer, space systems
Korea Data Systems	코리아데이타시스템스	-	Technology	Computer hardware & peripherals	Seoul	1983	Monitors manufacturer, defunct 2003
Korea Development Bank	한국산업은행	-	Financials	Banks	Seoul	1954	Bank
Korea Electric Power Corporation	한국전력공사	-	Utilities	Electricity	Naju	1961	Electric utility
Korail	코레일	-	Consumer services	Rail transport	Daejeon	1963	Passenger railway services
Korean Air	대한항공	Hanjin	Consumer services	Airlines	Seoul	1969	Airline
Korea Zinc	고려아연 주식회사	Young Poong Group	Basic materials	Mining	Seoul	1974	Mining & metallurgy
Korean Broadcasting System	한국방송공사	-	Consumer services	Media	Seoul	1927	Television broadcasting
Koscom	코스콤	-	Financials	Financial services	Seoul	1977	Financial services technology
KOTRA	코트라	-	Industrials	Support services	Seoul	1962	Korea trade-investment promotion agency
KR Motors	KR모터스	Hyosung	Consumer goods	Automobiles	Changwon	1978	Motorcycles
KT Corporation	케이티 주식회사	KT Corporation	Telecommunications	Fixed line telecommunications	Seongnam	1885	Telecommunications
Korea Tobacco & Ginseng Corporation	한국담배인삼공사	-	Consumer goods	Tobacco	Daejeon	1899	Tobacco products
Krafton	크래프톤		Technology	Software	Seoul	2018	Video games
Kumho Asiana Cultural Foundation	금호아시아나문화재단	Kumho Asiana Group	Consumer services	Travel & leisure	Seoul	1977	Entertainment
Kumho Asiana Group	금호아시아나그룹	Kumho Asiana Group	Conglomerates	-	Seoul	1946	Airlines, tires, financials, leisure
Kumho Engineering and Construction	금호건설	Kumho Asiana Group	Industrials	Construction & materials	Seoul	1967	Construction and engineering
Kumho Petrochemical	금호석유화학 주식회사	Kumho Asiana Group	Basic materials	Chemicals	Seoul	1970	Rubber products
CJ KIFT	씨제이한국복합물류	Kumho Asiana Group	Industrials	Delivery services	Gunpo	1998	Logistics
Kumho Tire	금호타이어	Kumho Asiana Group	Consumer goods	Tires	Gwangju	1960	Tires
Kyobo Book Centre	교보문고	Kyobo Life Insurance	Consumer services	Retail	Seoul	1980	Bookseller
Kyobo Life Insurance	교보생명		Financials	Insurance	Seoul	1958	Life insurance
LG Chem	LG화학	LG Corporation	Basic materials	Chemicals	Seoul	1947	Chemicals
LG CNS	엘지 씨엔에스	LG Corporation	Technology	Computer services	Seoul	1987	I/T consulting
LG Corporation	주식회사 LG	LG Corporation	Conglomerates	-	Seoul	1947	Electronics, chemicals, telecom
LG Display	LG디스플레이	LG Corporation	Industrials	Electronic & electrical equipment	Seoul	1995	LCD panels
LG Electronics	LG전자	LG Corporation	Consumer goods	Consumer electronics	Seoul	1958	Consumer electronics
LG Uplus	LG유플러스	LG Corporation	Telecommunications	Mobile telecommunications	Seoul	1996	Mobile provider
LIG Nex1	엘아이지넥스원	-	Industrials	Aerospace & defense	Seoul	1976	Electronics, military equipment, munitions, rockets
LOEN Entertainment	로엔 엔터테인먼트	LOEN Entertainment	Consumer services	Media	Seoul	1978	Entertainment
Lotte Group	롯데	Lotte Group	Conglomerates	-	Seoul	1948	Food & beverage, financials, industrials
Lotte Biologics	롯데바이오로직스	Lotte Group	Industrials	Biopharmaceutical	Seoul	2022	Pharmaceutics
Lotte Capital	롯데캐피탈	Lotte Group	Financials	Financial services	Seoul	1995	Financial services
Lotte Card	롯데카드	Lotte Group	Financials	Financial services	Seoul	2002	Credit cards
Lotte Cinema	롯데쇼핑㈜롯데시네마	Lotte Group	Consumer services	Travel & leisure	Seoul	1999	Cinemas
Lotte Chemical	롯데케미칼	Lotte Group	Basic materials	Chemicals	Seoul	1976	Chemicals
Lotte Chilsung	롯데칠성음료	Lotte Group	Consumer goods	Food & beverage	Seoul	1950	Beverage
Lotte Confectionery	롯데제과	Lotte Group	Consumer goods	Food & beverage	Seoul	1967	Confections
Lotte Department Store	롯데백화점	Lotte Group	Consumer services	Retail	Seoul	1979	Department stores
Lotte Global Logistics	롯데글로벌로지스 and 롯데택배	Lotte Group	Industrials	Delivery services	Seoul	1988	Logistics
Lotte Hotels & Resorts	롯데호텔앤리조트	Lotte Group	Consumer services	Travel & leisure	Seoul	1973	Hotels
Lotte World	롯데월드	Lotte Group	Consumer services	Travel & leisure	Seoul	1989	Recreation complex
LS Cable & System	LS전선, 엘에스전선	LS Group	Industrials	Electrical components & equipment	Anyang	1936	Cables, industrial systems
LS Group	LS그룹	LS Group	Conglomerates	-	Anyang	1936	Electric equipment, metallurgy, heavy machinery, automation
LS Mtron	엘에스엠트론	LS Group	Industrials	Industrial engineering	Anyang	1977	Defense, military vehicles components, heavy machinery, tractors, electronic components
Mando Corporation	만도	Halla Group	Consumer goods	Auto parts	Seongnam	1962	OEM parts
Meritz Financial Group	주식회사 메리츠금융지주	-	Financials	Financial services	Seoul	2011	Financial support
Mirae Asset Group	미래에셋금융그룹	-	Financials	Financial services	Seoul	1997	Financial services
M-Pio	엠피오	-	Consumer goods	Consumer electronics	Seongnam	1998	Digital audio & video equipment manufacturer
MBC	문화방송주식회사	-	Consumer services	Media	Seoul	1961	Broadcasting
Namhae Chemical Corporation	남해화학	-	Basic materials	Chemicals	Yeosu	1974	Chemicals
Naver Corporation	네이버 주식회사	-	Technology	Internet	Seongnam	1999	Internet conglomerate
NCsoft	엔씨소프트	-	Technology	Software	Pangyo	1997	Video games
Netmarble Games	넷마블게임즈	-	Technology	Software	Seoul	2000	Video games
Nexen Tire	넥센타이어	-	Consumer goods	Tires	Yangsan	1942	Tires
Nexon	넥슨	-	Technology	Software	Seoul	1994	Video games
National Agricultural Cooperative Federation	농업협동조합	National Agricultural Cooperative Federation	Conglomerates	-	Seoul	1961	Agricultural & financial services
NongHyup Bank	농협은행	National Agricultural Cooperative Federation	Financials	Banks	Seoul	2012	Bank
Nongshim	농심	-	Consumer goods	Food & beverage	Seoul	1965	Food and beverage conglomerate, processed food
OCI	오씨아이 주식회사	-	Basic materials	Chemicals	Seoul	1959	Chemicals
On-Media	온 미디어	CJ Group	Consumer services	Media	Seongnam	2000	broadcasting
Oriental Brewery	오비맥주	Anheuser-Busch InBev (Belgium)	Consumer goods	Brewers	Seoul	1952	Brewery
Orion Confectionery	주식회사 오리온	-	Consumer goods	Food & beverage	Seoul	1956	Confectionery
Ottogi	주식회사 오뚜기	-	Consumer goods	Food & beverage	Seoul	1969	Instant food
Pantech	주식회사 팬택	-	Consumer goods	Consumer electronics	Seoul	1991	Mobile phones manufacturer
Perigee Aerospace	페리지에어로스페이스	-	Industrial	Aerospace	Daejeon	2018	Launch vehicle manufacturer (KRX: 462350)
Phantagram	판타그램	-	Technology	Software	Seoul	1994	Video games
Pledis Entertainment	플레디스 엔터테인먼트	-	Consumer services	Media	Seoul	2007	Record label
Poongsan Corporation	풍산	-	Industrials	Defense	Seoul	1968	Ammunitions, metals
POSCO	주식회사 포스코	-	Basic materials	Steel	Pohang	1968	Steel
Proto Motors	프로토자동차	-	Consumer goods	Automobiles	Seoul	1997	Automobile, defunct 2017
Renault Korea	르노코리아	Renault (France)	Consumer goods	Automobiles	Busan	1994	Automobile manufacturer
Samick	삼익악기	-	Consumer goods	Consumer electronics	Eumseong County	1958	Musical instruments
Sampyo	삼표	Sampyo	Conglomerates	-	Seoul	1966	Constructions conglomerate
Sampyo Cement	삼표시멘트	Sampyo	Industrials	Cement	Seoul	1957	Cement
Samsung	삼성	Samsung	Conglomerates	-	Seoul	1938	Electronics, financials, retail, media
Samsung Asset Management	삼성자산운용	Samsung	Financials	Financial services	Seoul	1998	
Samsung Biologics	삼성바이오로직스	Samsung	Industrials	Biopharmaceutical	Incheon	2011	Pharmaceutics (KRX: 207940)
Samsung Card	삼성카드	Samsung	Financials	Financial services	Seoul	1988	Credit cards
Samsung C&T Corporation	삼성물산	Samsung	Industrials	Construction & materials	Seoul	1938	Construction, engineering, trade, investments, fashion, real estate
Samsung Digital Imaging	삼성디지털이미징	Samsung	Industrials	Electronic & electrical equipment	Seoul	2009	Optoelectronics
Samsung Display	삼성디스플레이	Samsung	Industrials	Electronic & electrical equipment	Asan	2004	Display products
Samsung E&A	삼성이앤에이	Samsung	Industrials	Construction & materials	Seoul	1970	Construction
Samsung Electro-Mechanics	삼성전기	Samsung	Industrials	Electronic & electrical equipment	Suwon	1973	Electronic components
Samsung Electronics	삼성전자	Samsung	Consumer goods	Consumer electronics	Suwon	1969	Consumer electronics
Samsung Fire & Marine Insurance	삼성화재	Samsung	Financials	Insurance	Seoul	1952	General insurance
Samsung Heavy Industries	삼성중공업	Samsung	Industrials	Industrial engineering	Seoul	1974	Shipyard, engine & heavy machinery manufacturer
Samsung Life Insurance	삼성생명보험	Samsung	Financials	Insurance	Seoul	1957	Life and health insurance
Samsung Medical Center	삼성의료원	Samsung	Health care	Health care providers	Seoul	1994	Hospital
Samsung SDI	삼성SDI	Samsung	Industrials	Electronic & electrical equipment	Yongin	1970	Batteries, electronic materials
Samsung SDS	삼성에스디에스	Samsung	Technology	Computer services	Seoul	1985	I/T consulting
Samsung Securities	삼성증권	Samsung	Financials	Financial services	Seoul	1982	
Samyang Comtech	삼양컴텍	-	Industrials	Defense	Seoul	1962	Armor equipment, composite materials
Samyang Food	삼양식품	-	Consumer goods	Food & beverage	Seoul	1961	Food and beverage conglomerate, processed food
Satrec Initiative	쎄트렉아이		Industrials	Aerospace & defense	Daejeon	1999	Satellites & electronics systems
SeAH Aerospace & Defense	세아항공방산소재	Seah Holdings	Industrials	Aerospace & defense	Seoul	1945	Aluminum alloy materials and products
SeAH Besteel Holdings	세아베스틸지주	Seah Holdings	Basic materials	Steel	Seoul	2022	Steel
Seah Holdings	세아홀딩스	Seah Holdings	Conglomerates	-	Seoul	1960	Holding company
SeAh Steel Holdings	세아스틸홀딩스	-	Basic materials	Steel	Seoul	1960	Steel
Sindoh	신도	-	Technology	Computer hardware & peripherals	Seoul	1960	Computer printing equipment
SM Entertainment	SM엔터테인먼트	-	Consumer services	Media	Seoul	1989	Record label
SM Group	SM그룹 (대한민국 기업)	SM Group	Conglomerates	-	Seoul	1988	Industrial conglomerate, media
SNT Dynamics	SNT다이내믹스	-	Industrials	Industrial engineering	Changwon	1959	Defense, artillery, military vehicles components, automotive
SNT Motiv	SNT모티브	-	Industrials	Defense	Busan	1981	Firearms
Standard Chartered Korea	SC제일은행	Standard Chartered (UK)	Financials	Banks	Seoul	1929	Bank
Seoul Broadcasting System	에스비에스	-	Consumer services	Media	Seoul	1991	Broadcasting
Shinhan Bank	신한은행	-	Financials	Banks	Seoul	1897	Bank
Shinsegae	신세계	-	Consumer services	Retail	Seoul	1955	Department stores
SK Broadband		SK Group	Telecommunications	Fixed line telecommunications	Seoul	2008	Acquired by SK Group in 2008
SK ecoplant	SK에코플랜트	SK Group	Industrial	Renewable energy	Seoul	1962	Solar panels, offshore wind power structures (KRX: 003340)
SK C&C	에스케이씨앤씨	SK Group	Technology	Computer services	Seoul	1991	I/T consulting
SK Group	에스케이그룹	SK Group	Conglomerates	-	Seoul	1953	Energy, chemicals, telecom, semiconductors
SK Hynix	에스케이하이닉스 주식회사	SK Group	Technology	Semiconductors	Icheon	1983	Semiconductor (KRX: 000660)
SK Innovation	에스케이이노베이션 주식회사	SK Group	Oil & gas	Oil & gas exploration & production	Seoul	1967	Oil & gas exploration, petroleum products, batteries
SK Oceanplant	SK오션플랜트	SK Group	Industrials	Industrial engineering	Goseong	1996	Shipbuilding, steel pipe manufacturer, offshore wind power generation(KRX: 100090)
SK Telecom	에스케이텔레콤	SK Group	Telecommunications	Mobile telecommunications	Seoul	1984	Wireless
SL Corporation	에스엘코포레이션	-	Consumer goods	Auto parts	Gyeongsan	1954	Parts
S-Oil	에쓰오일	Saudi Aramco (Saudi Arabia)	Oil & gas	Oil & gas exploration & production	Seoul	1977	Petroleum products
Starship Entertainment	스타쉽 엔터테인먼트	LOEN Entertainment	Consumer services	Media	Seoul	2008	Record label
STX Corporation	에스티엑스	STX Corporation	Conglomerates	-	Changwon	1976	Industrials, construction, financials
STX Offshore & Shipbuilding	STX조선해양	STX Corporation	Industrials	Industrial engineering	Changwon	1962	Shipbuilder
TaeguTec	대구텍	Berkshire Hathaway (USA)	Industrials	Industrial machinery	Daegu	1916	Metals alloy tools manufacturer
Taekwang Group	태광그룹	Taekwang Group	Conglomerates	-	Seoul	1950	Clothing, chemicals, industrials, financials
Taekwang Industrial	태광산업	Taekwang Group	Basic materials	Textile products	Seoul	1950	Textiles, petrochemicals, wet weather and safety clothing
Tata Daewoo	타타대우상용차	Tata Motors (India)	Consumer goods	Automobiles	Gunsan	2002	Automobile manufacturer
The Chosun Ilbo	조선일보	-	Consumer services	Publishing	Seoul	1920	Publishing
The Dong-a Ilbo	동아일보	The Dong-a Ilbo Media Group	Consumer services	Media	Seoul	1920	Newspaper
TmaxSoft	티맥스소프트	-	Technology	Software	Seongnam	1997	Enterprise middleware
TriGem	삼보컴퓨터	-	Technology	Computer hardware & peripherals	Seoul	1980	Computer systems, electronics, telecommunications, defunct 2010
T'way Airlines	티웨이항공	-	Consumer services	Airlines	Seoul	2010	Airline
WeMade Entertainment	위메이드 엔터테인먼트	-	Technology	Software	Seoul	2000	Video games (KRX: 112040)
Woojin Industrial Systems	우진산전	-	Industrials	Commercial vehicles & parts	Goesan	1974	Buses, metros, monorails manufacturer
Woollim Entertainment	울림엔터테인먼트	SM Entertainment	Consumer services	Media	Seoul	2003	Record label
Woori Bank	우리은행	Woori Bank	Financials	Banks	Seoul	1899	Bank
NH Investment & Securities	NH투자증권, formerly 우리투자증권	Woori Bank	Financials	Financial services	Seoul	1969	Financial services
YG Entertainment	YG 엔터테인먼트	-	Consumer services	Media	Seoul	1996	Record label
Young Poong Group	영풍그룹	Young Poong Group	Conglomerates	-	Seoul	1949	Metallurgy, electronics, retail
Young Chang	영창뮤직	-	Consumer goods	Consumer electronics	Incheon	1956	Musical instruments
YTN	와이티엔	-	Consumer services	Media	Seoul	1993	Broadcasting
Yuhan	유한양행	-	Basic materials	Chemicals	Seoul	1926	Chemicals

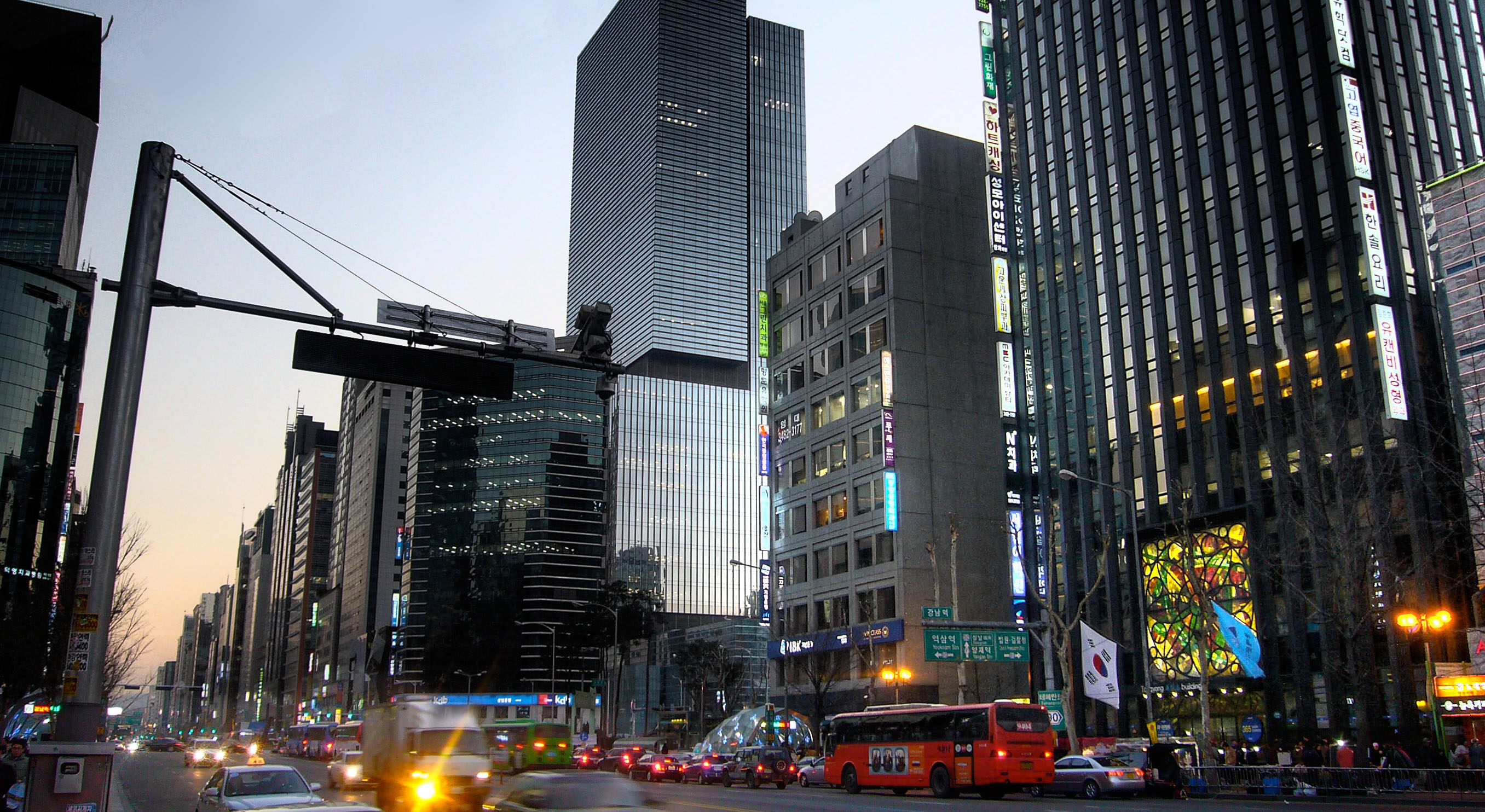
Gangnam Commercial Area

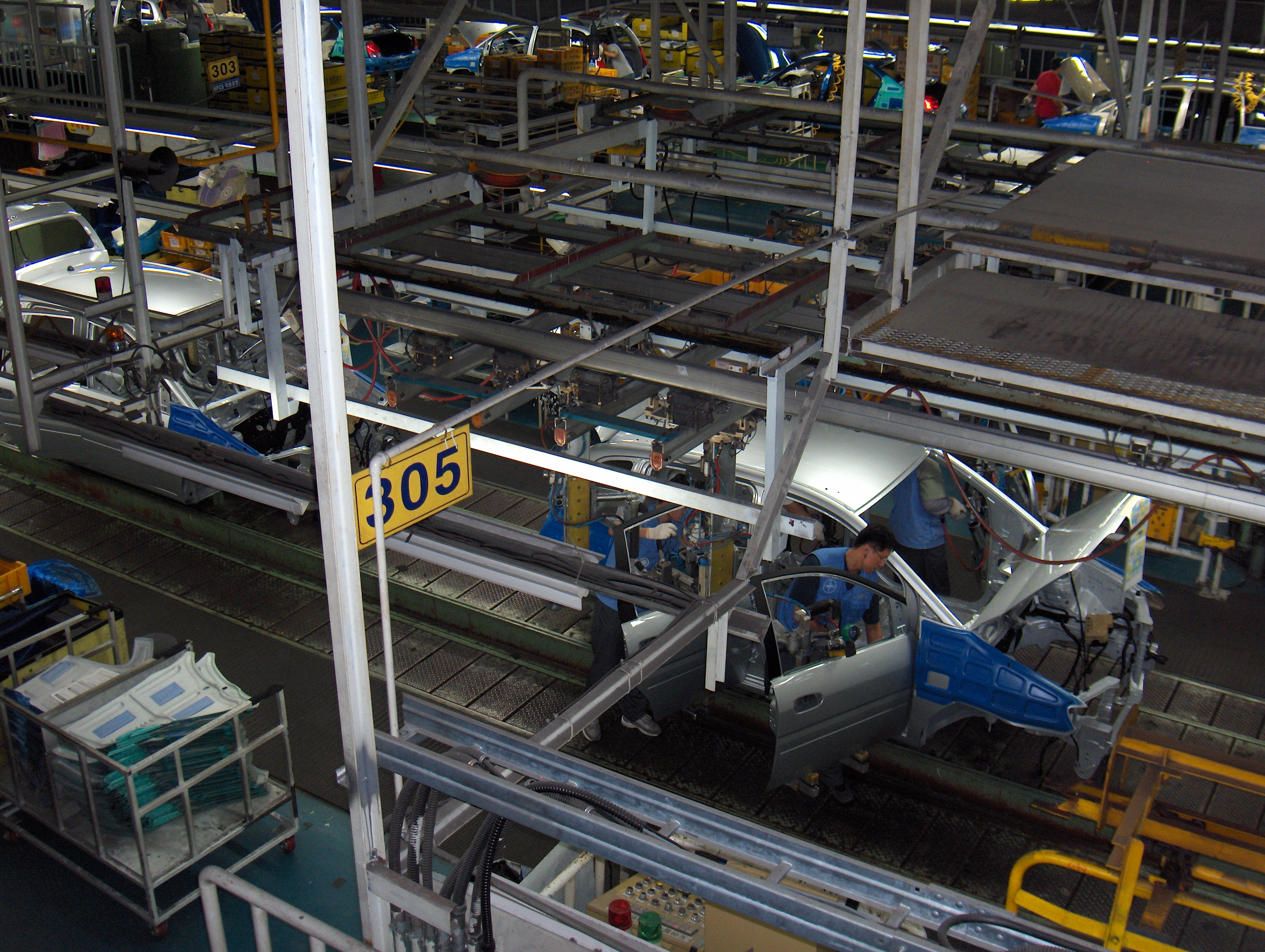
Hyundai automotive assembly line

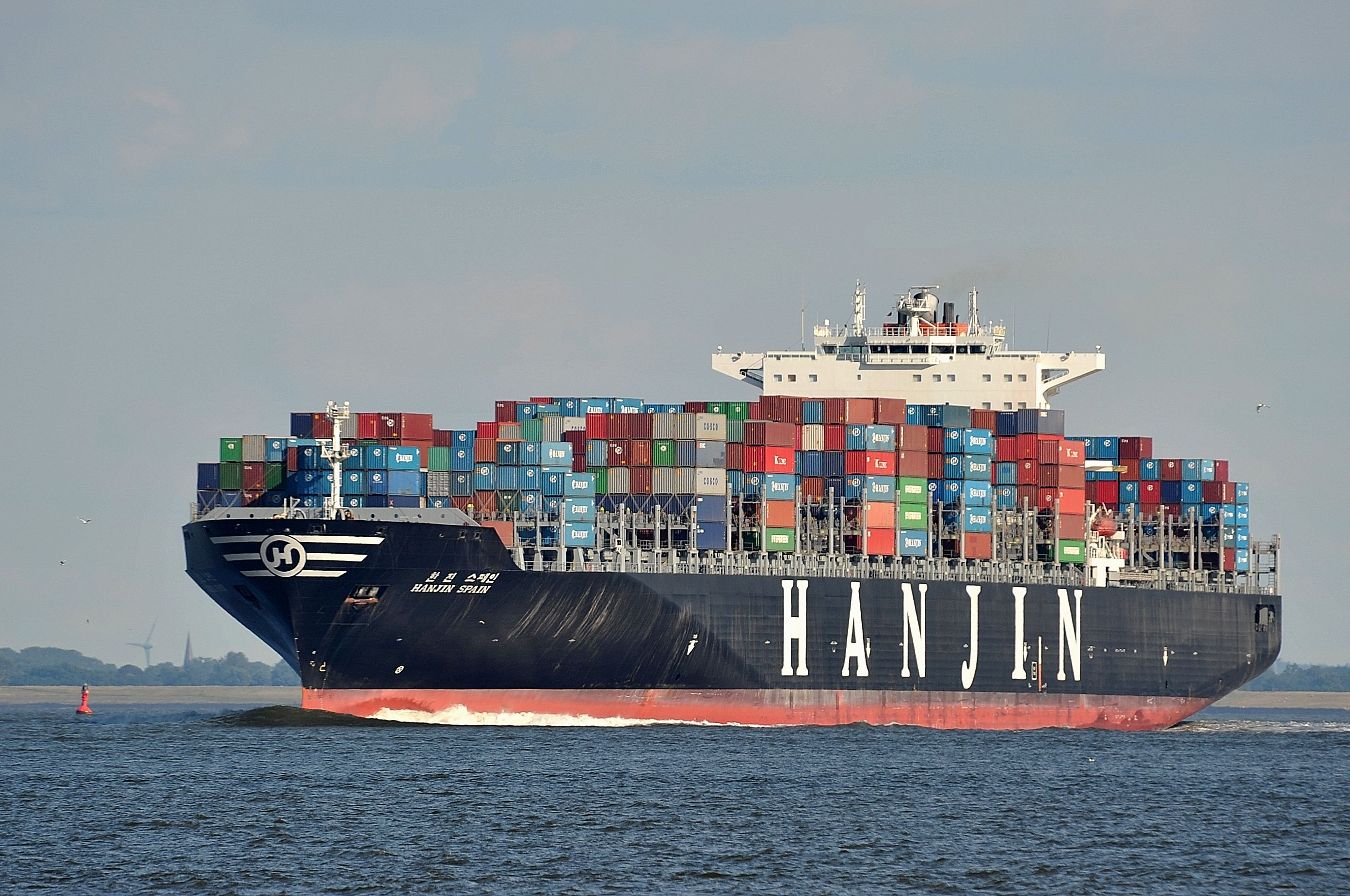
Hanjin Spain passing Hamburg

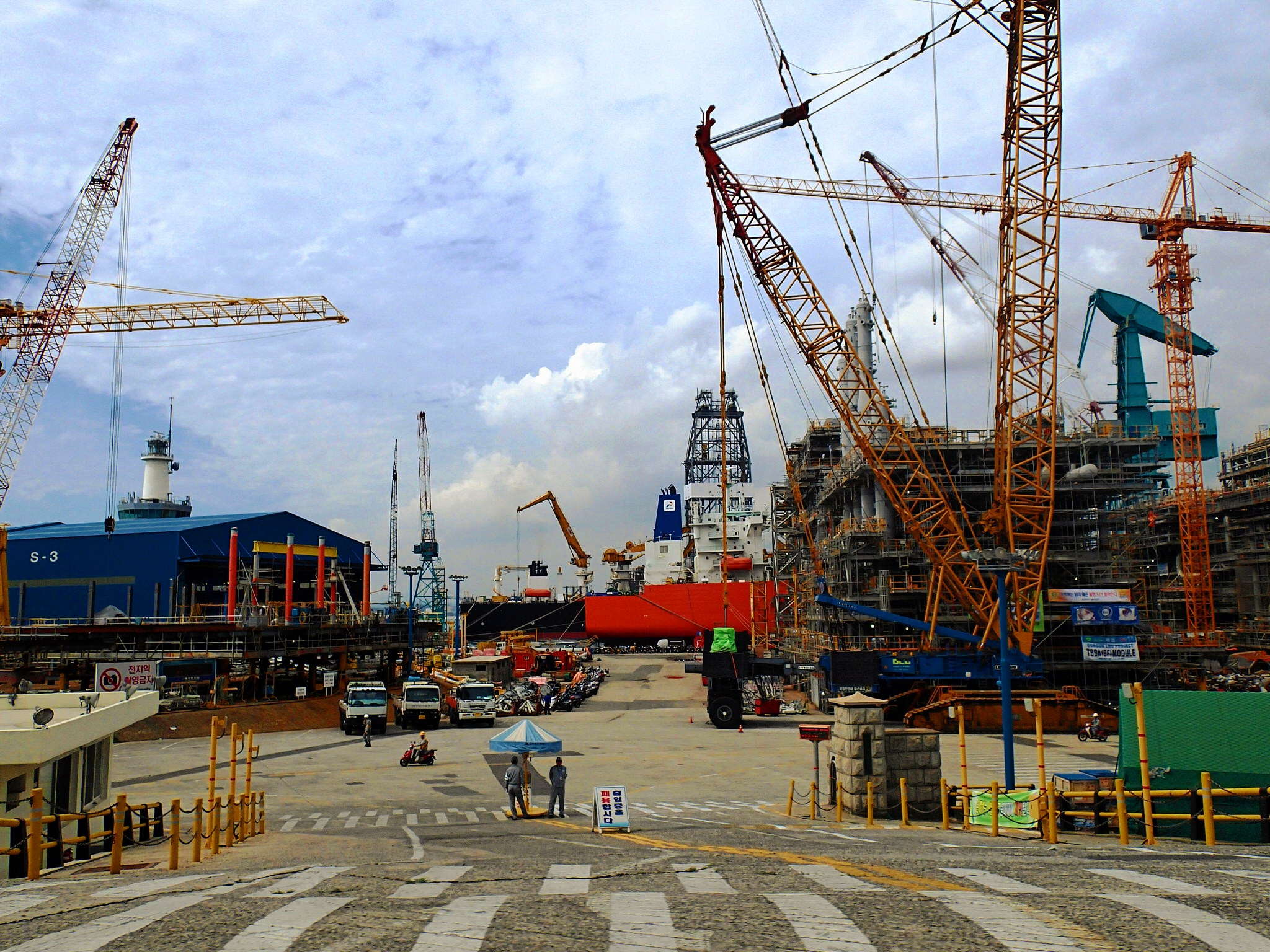
Hyundai Heavy Industries shipyard

== See also ==
- Chaebeol
- Economy of South Korea
- Education in South Korea
- KOSDAQ
- KOSPI
- Mobile phone industry in South Korea
- Green Optics Co., Ltd.
- Small and medium-sized enterprises in South Korea
