= Electronics industry in South Korea =

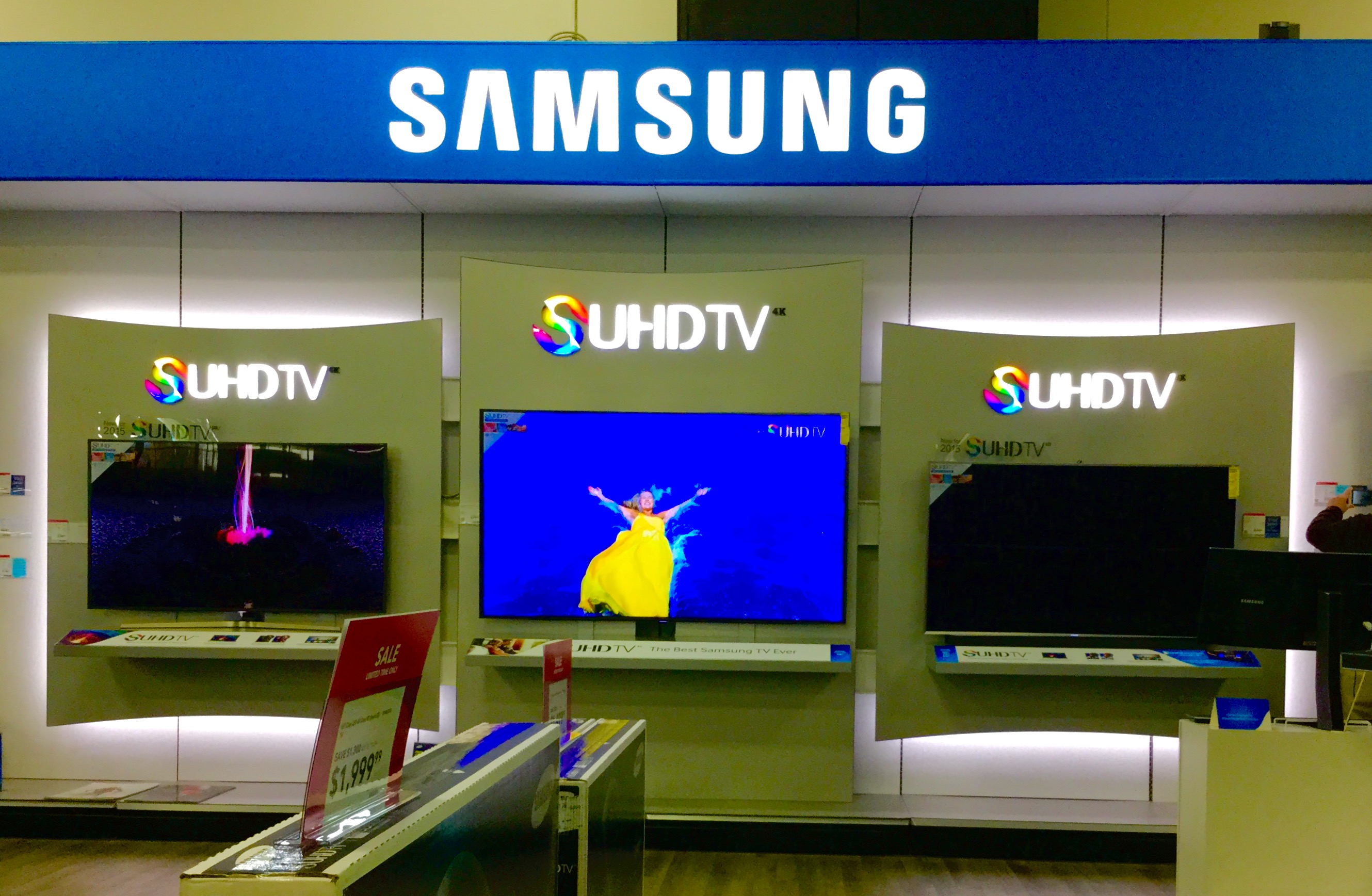
UHD TV by Samsung

South Korea is the world's third-largest producer of electronics after China and the United States, accounting for 6.8 percent of global production. South Korea's electronics industry ranked third by production last year, and fifth by consumption. As of 2017, South Korea's electronics industry recorded a production volume of $121.7 billion.

== History ==
For several years after Goldstar produced South Korea's first radio in 1959, the country's electronics industry was mainly focused on internally oriented import substitution, and there were no government agencies or policies to promote the electronics industry. However, the Park Chung-hee government drafted a comprehensive plan to foster the electronics industry as an export-oriented strategic industry in December 1966 after designating 'radio and electrical equipment' as one of 13 export-specialized industries in July 1965.

=== 1966–1979 ===
In the formative years of the electronics industry, the government strategically protected the domestic market and provided incentives for private companies to develop, produce, and export electronics for fostering. Technology has improved, ranging from assembling relatively basic products such as radios to producing more sophisticated products such as color TVs to preparing for the development of core components such as semiconductors.

=== 1980–1992 ===
After its formation, South Korea's electronics industry entered a period of rapid growth, during which the government shifted its focus from consumer electronics to information and communication technology, and South Korean companies greatly expanded their R&D to diversify their products and develop core components and materials. During the same period, private companies also greatly expanded their R&D. As a result, Korea developed a digital transformation system in 1982 and 64K DRAM (world's third largest after the United States and Japan) in 1983.

=== 1993–present ===
Then, during the period of sophistication, the government and the private sector actively invested in improving core competencies and quality, taking Korea's electronics industry to a world level. The government provided key infrastructure for informatization and e-government, and sought and promoted new growth engines in cooperation with the private sector.

South Korea's Ministry of Commerce reported on September 1, 2025, that semiconductor exports reached a record $15 billion in August 2025, an increase of nearly a third from 2024, contributing to total monthly exports of $58.4 billion.

== Manufacturers ==
The following electronics industry have marketed and sold within South Korea:

- Bexel
- CAS Corporation
- HCT Co., Ltd.
- Jinwoo SMC
- LG Display
- LG Electronics
- LG Energy Solution
- Samsung Electronics
- Samsung SDI
- Coway
- Cuckoo Electronics
- Winia Electronics

== See also ==
- Economy of South Korea
- Manufacturing in South Korea
