= Kim Sang-beom =

Kim Sang-beom or Kim Sang-bum may refer to:

- Kim Sang-bum (film editor) (born 1954), South Korean film editor
- Kim Sang-bum, birth name of the actor Kim Bum
- Kim Sang-beom, chief executive officer of the Isu Group
