= Universal Studios South Korea =

Cancelled theme park in Hwaseong

- Location: Hwaseong (planned), South Korea
- Owner: USK Consortium (let by K-water)
- Operated by: Universal Destinations & Experiences (licensed by)

Universal Studios South Korea (USSK; 유니버설 스튜디오 코리아) was a proposed Universal Studios theme park in the vicinity of Hwaseong, South Korea. Originally scheduled to open in 2020, a bid for the project was won by a Universal Studios Korea consortium in December 2015, led by China's largest state-run builder, China State Construction Engineering Corporation, and its largest state-run tourist agency, China Travel Services. K-Water, the owner of the project site, oversaw bidding. The consortium also includes the Korean construction firm Daewoo E&C and Korean engineering consulting firm Dohwa Engineering as well as Universal Studios Korea Property Holdings.

== Development history ==
Universal Studios South Korea was first announced on May 22, 2007 by Frank P. Stanek, the president of USKOR and Associates. While the announcement confirmed that they intended to construct a park in the country, USKOR declined to elaborate on other major details, such as a location and a construction budget, although local officials in the Gyeonggi Province stated that Ansan and Pyeongtaek were among the candidates to host the park. On November 27, 2007, Universal Destinations & Experiences announced that the park would be constructed in Hwaseong City, located south of Seoul and also near Incheon International Airport, and has been allotted a budget of US$3.1 billion.

The selection of South Korea for another theme park was based on many factors. Thomas L. Williams, president of Universal Parks and Resorts, specifically mentioned the country's strong economic growth and its love of American movies. He also noted that approximately half of South Korea's population lived near Seoul. The nation's proximity to China was not lost on the development team. Stanek said, "What we are hoping to do is to bring in a world class attraction not only for the Korean people but to draw tourism to this country." Gyeonggi Governor Kim Moon-soo estimates that Universal Studios South Korea could generate 2.9 trillion won (US$3.2 billion) in foreign investment, 190 million won per year in tax revenues and 60,000 new jobs.

In January 2010, developers of the Universal Studios theme park and resort in South Korea said the project was slated to open in early 2014, after being delayed by the 2008 financial crisis. Plans for Universal Studios Korea Resort, billed as the largest such Universal project in Asia, were originally announced in May 2007 amid hopes it would be up and running in 2012. Kim Moon-Soo, governor of the province in which the resort is set to be built, blamed the 2008 financial crisis for the delay, but said the large-scale project is back on track. Construction was scheduled to start at the beginning of the following year, according to a release.

Kim Moon-Soo stated that "Our Universal Studios in Korea is bigger than all the other studios combined" at a press event, referring to theme parks already operating in Orlando, Florida and Universal City, California in the United States, Osaka, Japan and the latest Universal Studios Singapore. "This will be a remarkable landmark in terms of tourism in Korea," he said. A total of 15 partners were participating in the development, including South Korean conglomerate Lotte Group and builder Posco E&C. They signed a framework agreement on January 19, 2010, to raise capital for the 3 trillion won ($2.7 billion) project expected to attract 15 million visitors a year in South Korea and from abroad.

On August 15, 2014, it was announced that the project ran by Lotte was cancelled and that K-Water will look for a new consortium. On July 13, 2015, the Gyeonggi province government announced that they are trying to restart development of Universal Studios Korea. On December 22, 2015, it was officially announced that plans for Universal Studios Korea were revived again and that it was slated to open in early 2020, before Universal Studios Beijing's opening date. On January 8, 2016, JoongAng Ilbo, a Korean news website, clarified that Universal replied to them via email, stating that they were "looking into the feasibility of a project in Korea but had no involvement in the project announced by K-Water last year". On June 21, 2016, details for the project were likely to be delayed until August, and that it would be announced after the appointment K-Water's new CEO that month.

In March 2018, Gyeonggi province government, Hwaseong City, K-Water announced that they were trying to restart development of Universal Studios Korea. In April 2020, the provincial government announced the Universal Studios Korea plan was scrapped; they instead signed a contract with Shinsegae Property Consortium to develop a new theme park.

== Park design ==
No specifics on the layout or attraction lineup were mentioned during the May 2007 press conference, although both USKOR and Universal suggested that the future park might be larger than both Universal Studios Hollywood and Universal Studios Japan.

Universal Parks & Resorts CEO Thomas L. Williams stated during the signing of the framework agreement that, in addition to the theme park, the project would include a water park, shopping center, hotels and a golf course and has renowned American director Steven Spielberg as creative consultant. It was also noted that the park would have been influenced not only by U.S. movie icons, but those of the South Korean film industry, as well.

== Competition ==
Universal Studios South Korea would have entered a competitive market, with both established theme parks and others future projects announced by rival studios. The day before the park was made public, MGM had announced plans for a future park in Incheon, which itself was unveiled after Viacom subsidiary Paramount Pictures announced it was exploring the potential for its own theme park near Seoul. Each of these parks would be going up against two popular local parks, Everland and Lotte World. Everland hosted 7.5 million guests in 2006, ranking it fourth in Asia behind the two Tokyo Disney Resort parks and Universal Studios Japan, while Lotte World attracted 5.5 million guests to land in fifth place.
