= Joas =

Korean electronics company

- Hangul: 조아스
- Revised Romanization: Joaseu
- McCune–Reischauer: Choasŭ

Joas is an electronics company headquartered in Seoul and Namyangju Gyeonggi-do, Korea. It was established in 1982 under the name SungJin Electronics but the name was changed in 1999 to Joas Electronics and in 2014 it became Joas. The company got a licensing deal with the global fashion brand Elle (magazine) for small appliances in 2015. It manufactures many electronic beauty products.

== Products ==
- Home appliances: Diamond peeling appliance, hair iron, hair dryer, electric hair clipper, electric shaver, wireless vacuum, as well as pet appliances.

== See also ==
- Economy of South Korea
- List of South Korean companies
