= SM Group =

SM Group may refer to:

- SM Group (South Korean company), a conglomerate based in Seoul, South Korea, founded in 1988
- SM Investments, a Filipino conglomerate founded in 1958
- SM Entertainment, a South Korean multinational entertainment agency established in 1995
