= Chaebol =

South Korean family-run business conglomerate

- Hangul: 재벌
- Hanja: 財閥
- RR: jaebeol
- MR: chaebŏl
- IPA: [tɕɛbʌɭ]

A chaebol (Note: (UK: /ˈtʃeɪbəl, ˈtʃeɪbɒl/ CHAY-bəl, CHAY-bol, US: /ˈtʃeɪboʊl, ˈdʒɛbəl/ CHAY-bohl, JEB-əl;.) (Korean: 재벌; [tɕɛbʌɭ]) is a type of large industrial South Korean conglomerate run and controlled by an individual or family. A chaebol often consists of multiple diversified affiliates, controlled by a person or group. Several dozen large South Korean family-controlled corporate groups fall under this definition. The term first appeared in English text in 1972.

Although chaebol have often accounted for a majority of South Korea's GDP, their share of employment has been much smaller. Chaebol have also played a significant role in South Korean politics. In 1988, a member of a chaebol family, Chung Mong-joon, president of Hyundai Heavy Industries, successfully ran for the National Assembly of South Korea. Other business leaders were also chosen to be members of the National Assembly through proportional representation. Hyundai has made efforts in the thawing of North Korean relations, despite some controversy. Many South Korean family-run chaebol have been criticized "for low dividend payouts and other governance practices that favor controlling shareholders at the expense of ordinary investors."

== Etymology ==
"Chaebol" is most likely derived from the McCune–Reischauer romanization of the Korean word 재벌 (chaebŏl), without the breve above the o.

The word originates from the Sino-Japanese term zaibatsu (財閥), where 財 means 'wealth' and 閥 means 'clan'. The Japanese zaibatsu dominated their economy from 1868 until they were dissolved under the American Occupation of Japan in 1945. The rise and proliferation of the Korean chaebol resembles the Japanese zaibatsu at their peak.

The word has been loaned into English since at least 1972.

== History ==
=== Formation and boom ===
Jinju, a medium-sized city in the southern part of the country, is gaining attention for its recognition as the birthplace of Korean entrepreneurship.

This reputation is largely rooted in the intriguing fact that a modest elementary school in the city is the alma mater of the founders of Samsung, LG, GS and Hyosung business groups.

South Korea's economy was small and predominantly agricultural well into the mid-20th century. However, policies of President Park Chung Hee spurred rapid industrialisation by promoting large businesses, following his seizure of power in 1961. The First Five Year Economic Plan by the government set industrial policy towards new investment, and chaebols were to be guaranteed loans from the banking sector. The chaebol played a key role in developing new industries, markets, and export production, helping make South Korea one of the Four Asian Tigers.

Some businesses that acquired former Japanese assets in South Korea later grew into chaebol. These and other businesses were closely tied to the Syngman Rhee government, allegedly trading favors for payments.

The Samsung Group differs from other Chaebols in that the Group established its flagship firms, Cheil Jedang (1953) and Cheil Industries (1954), without having received any ex-Japanese assets or enterprises.

The Japanese colonial government sometimes sought to co-opt local businessmen and wealthy individuals often linked to land ownership, and a significant minority of industries were jointly owned by Japanese and Korean businesses. A few Korean chaebols, such as Kyungbang, came into existence during this era.

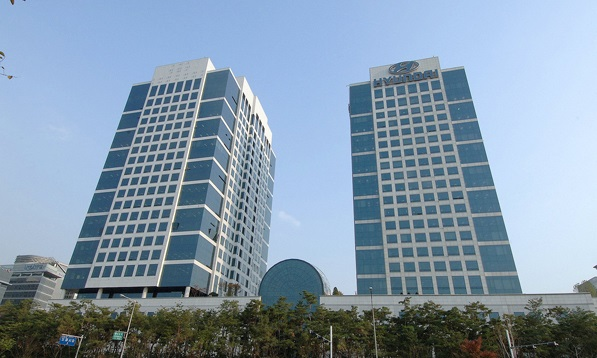
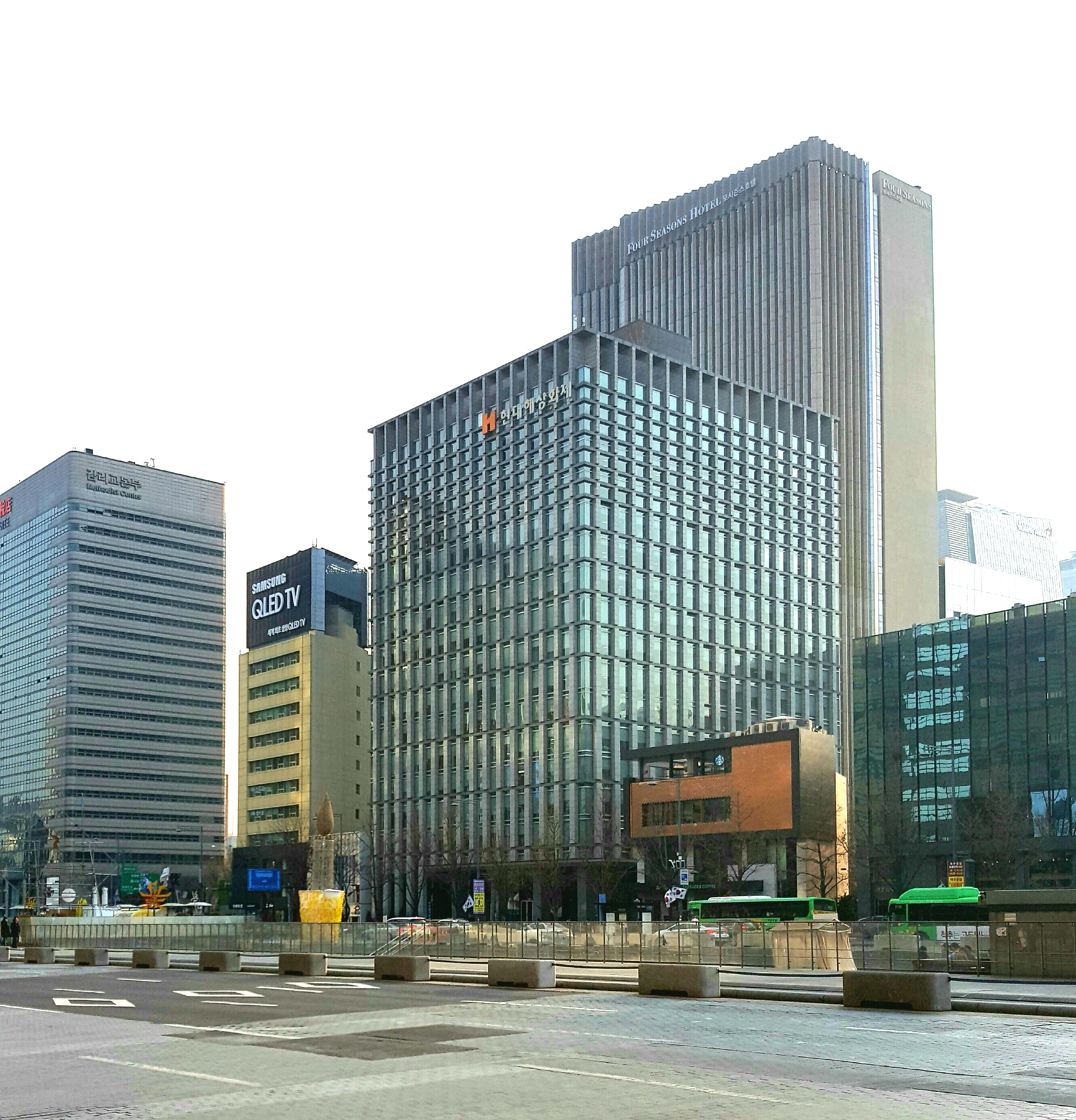
Hyundai Motor Company and Hyundai Marine & Fire Insurance

The military government aimed to eradicate the corruption that plagued Rhee's when they took over in 1961. Some arrests and corruption charges followed, but many of the accused only paid fines. Corporations and government would increasingly cooperate on the government's modernization plans. Although it led to economic growth, government reliance on chaebol accelerated the concentration of market power.

Park prioritized exports over imports and established performance quotas. The chaebol grew through foreign loans, special favors, and access to foreign technology. The government channeled funds to companies it selected for projects and guaranteed repayment to foreign creditors.

Chaebols expanded alongside South Korea's exports. Production diversified from wigs and textiles in the 1950s and 1960s to heavy, defense, and chemical industries by the 1970s and 1980s. Electronics and high-technology industries were growing by the 1990s. The financial growth of chaebol reduced the need for government assistance.

=== 1990–present ===
Former headquarters of the defunct Daewoo Group, once the second-largest conglomerate in South Korea

By the 1990s, South Korea was one of the largest newly industrialised countries and boasted a standard of living comparable to industrialized countries.

President Kim Young-sam began to challenge the chaebol, but it was not until the 1997 Asian financial crisis that the weaknesses of the system were widely understood. Initially, the crisis was caused by a speculative attack on the Thai baht, which lead to a sharp drop in its value and immediate cash flow concerns needed to pay foreign debts; widespread foreign investment and financial deregulation across East Asia allowed foreign investors to attack the values of the national currencies of other countries in the region, including South Korea, which spread the financial crisis to the affected countries and caused a downward spiral in the value of the South Korean won. As a result, chaebols, which at this point were overleveraged in short-term debts and already suffering from falling export prices, started going bankrupt: of the 30 largest chaebols, 11 collapsed during the financial crisis.

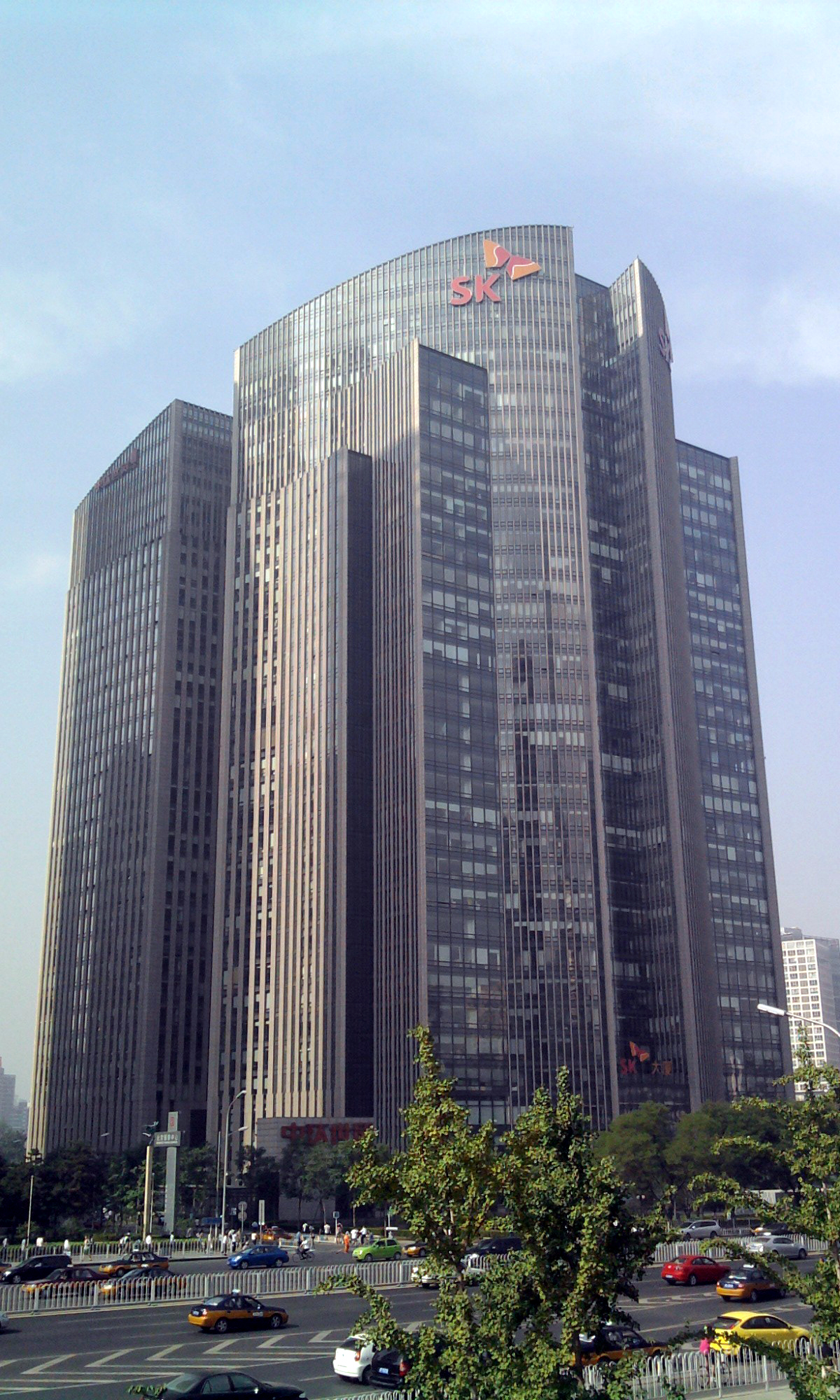
SK Group headquarters and SK Tower Beijing

The remaining chaebols also became far more specialized in their focus. For example, with a population ranked 26th in the world, before the crisis, the country had seven major automobile manufacturers. Afterward, only two major manufacturers remained intact, though two additional ones continued, in a smaller capacity, under General Motors and Renault. Chaebol debts were not only to state industrial banks but also to independent banks and their financial services subsidiaries. The scale of the loan defaults meant that banks could neither foreclose nor write off bad loans without themselves collapsing, so the failure to service these debts quickly caused a systemic banking crisis, and South Korea turned to the IMF for assistance. The most spectacular example came in mid-1999, with the collapse of the Daewoo Group, which had some US$80 billion in unpaid debt. At the time, it was the largest corporate bankruptcy in history. Investigations also exposed widespread corruption in the chaebols, particularly fraudulent accounting, and bribery.

South Korea recovered quickly from the crisis, and most of the blame for economic problems was shifted to the IMF, which had forced the government to adopt 30% interest rate in exchange for a US$55 billion bailout. The remaining chaebols have grown substantially since the crisis, but they have maintained far lower debt levels.

In 2019, the revenue of the largest chaebol, Samsung, was worth about 17% of the South Korean GDP with the company holding billions of dollars in cash. In 2023, the revenue of the top four chaebols (Samsung, SK, Hyundai, and LG) was 40.8% of the South Korean GDP, and the top thirty chaebol were 76.9% of GDP.

== Ranking ==
Ranking of Chaebols by assets as of 1 May 2025
2025 Rank	2024 Rank	Change	Group Name	Representative	Affiliates 2025	Affiliates 2024	Assets 2025 (trillion KRW)	Assets 2024 (trillion KRW)	Type
1	1	Steady	Samsung	Lee Jae-yong	63	63	589.1	571.4	limited assurance (Note: Chaebols whose assets exceed 0.5% of South Korea's GDP)
2	2	Steady	SK	Chey Tae-won	198	219	363	352.1	limited assurance
3	3	Steady	Hyundai Motor	Chung Eui-sun	74	70	306.6	297.4	limited assurance
4	4	Steady	LG	Koo Kwang-mo	63	60	186.1	180.5	limited assurance
5	6	▲1	Lotte	Shin Dong-bin	92	96	143.3	139	limited assurance
6	5	▼1	POSCO	POSCO	49	47	137.8	133.7	limited assurance
7	7	Steady	Hanwha	Kim Dong-kwan	119	108	125.7	122	limited assurance
8	8	Steady	HD Hyundai Heavy Industries	Chung Mong-joon	32	29	88.7	86.1	limited assurance
9	10	▲1	NongHyup	NongHyup	56	54	80.1	77.7	limited assurance
10	9	▼1	GS	Huh Chang-soo	98	99	79.3	76.9	limited assurance
11	11	Steady	Shinsegae	Chung Yong-jin	59	53	63.9	61.9	limited assurance
12	14	▲2	Hanjin	Walter Cho	42	34	58.2	56.4	limited assurance
13	12	▼1	KT	KT	47	48	46.3	44.9	limited assurance
14	13	▼1	CJ	Lee Jay-hyun	66	73	39.4	38.2	limited assurance
15	16	▲1	LS	Koo Ja-eun	72	67	36	34.9	limited assurance
16	15	▼1	Kakao	Kim Beom-soo	115	128	34.8	33.8	limited assurance
17	20	▲3	HMM	HMM	4	5	33.5	32.4	limited assurance
18	17	▼1	Doosan	Park Jeong-won	24	22	28.2	27.3	limited assurance
19	18	▼1	DL	Lee Hae-wook	45	45	27	26.2	limited assurance
20	21	▲1	Jeungheung	Jeong Chang-seon	51	53	26.7	25.9	limited assurance
21	19	▼2	Celltrion	Seo Jung-jin	9	8	26.7	25.9	limited assurance
22	23	▲1	Naver	Lee Hae-jin	45	54	25.5	24.7	limited assurance
23	25	▲2	S-Oil	S-Oil	2	2	24.5	23.8	limited assurance
24	22	▼2	Mirae-Asset	미래에셋	28	30	23.5	22.8	limited assurance
25	27	▲2	Coupang	Coupang	16	13	22.3	21.6	limited assurance
26	24	▼2	Hyundai Department Store	현대백화점	24	27	22.3	21.6	limited assurance
27	49	▲22	Hankook & Company	Jo Yang-Rae	25	24	21.5	20.9	limited assurance
28	26	▼2	Booyoung	Lee Joong-geun	21	21	21.5	20.8	limited assurance
29	32	▲3	Young Poong	Jang Hyung-jin	30	28	20.9	20.3	limited assurance
30	29	▼1	Harim	Kim Hong-guk	43	45	20	19.4	limited assurance
31	33	▲2	Hyosung	Cho Hyun-joon	60	57	19.8	19.2	limited assurance
32	38	▲6	Sinokor	Jeong Tae-soon	28	27	19.5	18.9	limited assurance
33	30	▼3	SM	Woo Oh-hyun	58	58	18.3	17.8	limited assurance
34	31	▼3	HDC	Chung Mong-gyu	34	35	17.5	17	limited assurance
35	34	▼1	Hoban	Kim Sang-yeol	40	39	16.9	16.4	limited assurance
36	53	▲17	Dunamu	Dunamu	11	12	15.9	15.4	limited assurance
37	36	▼1	KT&G	KT&G	17	14	15.7	15.3	limited assurance
38	40	▲2	Kolon	Lee Woong-yeol	45	48	15.2	14.7	limited assurance
39	37	▼2	KCC	Jeong Mong-jin	13	14	15	14.5	limited assurance
40	35	▼5	DB	Kim Jun-ki	24	25	14.8	14.4	limited assurance
41	43	▲2	Nexon	Yoo Jeong-hyeon	23	19	14.5	14.1	limited assurance
42	41	▼1	OCI	Lee Woo-hyun	24	24	13.8	13.4	limited assurance
43	45	▲2	LX	Bon-Joon Koo	17	17	12.7	12.3	limited assurance
44	44	Steady	SeAH Holdings	Lee Soon-hyung	24	26	12.4	12	limited assurance
45	46	▲1	Netmarble	Bang Jun-hyuk	31	35	11.8	11.4	limited assurance
46	48	▲2	E-Land	Park Seong-su	32	31	11.6	11.3	limited assurance
47	39	▼8	Kyobo	Shin Chang-jae	16	14	11.1	10.8	publicly disclosed corporate group (Note: Chaebols whose assets exceed 5 trillion won)
48	58	▲10	GM Korea	GM Korea	3	3	10.8	10.5	publicly disclosed corporate group
49	52	▲3	Daokuwoom	Kim Ik-rae	45	48	10.4	10.1	publicly disclosed corporate group
50	51	▲1	Kumho	Park Chan-gu	16	14	10	9.7	publicly disclosed corporate group
51	60	▲9	Daebang	Gu gyo-un	41	42	10	9.7	publicly disclosed corporate group
52	42	▼10	Taeyoung	Yoon Seyoung	51	82	9.8	9.5	publicly disclosed corporate group
53	54	▲1	Samchully	Lee Man-deuk	33	47	9.7	9.4	publicly disclosed corporate group
54	56	▲2	KG	Kwak Jae-sun	26	34	9.6	9.3	publicly disclosed corporate group
55	47	▼8	EcoPro	Lee Dong-chae	17	23	9.4	9.1	publicly disclosed corporate group
56	57	▲1	HL	Chung Mong-won	15	13	9.3	9	publicly disclosed corporate group
57	55	▼2	Dongwon	Kim Namjeong	23	26	8.9	8.6	publicly disclosed corporate group
58	59	▲1	Amorepacific	Suh Kyung-bae	15	13	8.7	8.4	publicly disclosed corporate group
59	50	▼9	Taekwang	Lee Ho-jin	20	20	8.7	8.4	publicly disclosed corporate group
60	64	▲4	Krafton	Chang Byung-gyu	9	8	8.5	8.3	publicly disclosed corporate group
61	70	▲9	Global Sae-A Group	Woonggi Kim	23	20	8.3	8	publicly disclosed corporate group
62	61	▼1	KAI	KAI	4	4	8.1	7.9	publicly disclosed corporate group
63	63	Steady	MDM	Moon Joo-hyun	19	15	8	7.8	publicly disclosed corporate group
64	86	▲22	Sono international	Park Chun-hee	25	23	7.4	7.2	publicly disclosed corporate group
65	62	▼3	Aekyung	Jang Young-shin	30	31	7.3	7.1	publicly disclosed corporate group
66	67	▲1	Dongkuk	Jang Se-ju	16	12	7.3	7.1	publicly disclosed corporate group
67	66	▼1	BS	Lee Ki-seung	66	65	7.3	7	publicly disclosed corporate group
68	65	▼3	Samyang	Kim Yun	13	13	7.1	6.9	publicly disclosed corporate group
69	-	New	LIG	Koo Bon-sang	18	-	7.1	6.9	publicly disclosed corporate group
70	69	▼1	Joongang	Hong Seok-hyun	57	54	6.9	6.7	publicly disclosed corporate group
71	72	▲1	Eugene	Yoo Kyung-seon	63	60	6.8	6.6	publicly disclosed corporate group
72	75	▲3	Korea HC	Park Jeong-seok	26	24	6.7	6.5	publicly disclosed corporate group
73	77	▲4	BGF	Hong Seok-jo	19	18	6.3	6.1	publicly disclosed corporate group
74	-	New	Daekwang	Cho Young-hoon	64	-	6.1	5.9	publicly disclosed corporate group
75	83	▲8	Bando	Kwon Hong-sa	15	18	6.1	5.9	publicly disclosed corporate group
76	78	▲2	Dashin	Yang Hong-seok	84	117	6	5.9	publicly disclosed corporate group
77	76	▼1	Okay	Choi Yun	16	16	5.8	5.6	publicly disclosed corporate group
78	79	▲1	HiteJinro	Park Mun-deok	12	11	5.7	5.6	publicly disclosed corporate group
79	80	▲1	Nongshim	Shin Dong-won	22	23	5.6	5.5	publicly disclosed corporate group
80	74	▼6	DN	Kim Sang-heon	7	8	5.6	5.5	publicly disclosed corporate group
81	68	▼13	Hyundai Marine & Fire Insurance	Jeong Mong-yoon	14	13	5.6	5.4	publicly disclosed corporate group
82	81	▼1	Shinyoung	Jeong Chun-bo	32	33	5.6	5.4	publicly disclosed corporate group
83	88	▲5	Paradise	Jeon Philip	11	14	5.4	5.3	publicly disclosed corporate group
84	71	▼13	IS	Gwon Hyuk-woon	32	36	5.4	5.2	publicly disclosed corporate group
85	85	Steady	Hybe	Bang Si-hyuk	12	15	5.4	5.2	publicly disclosed corporate group
86	82	▼4	Hansol	Jo Dong-gil	21	21	5.4	5.2	publicly disclosed corporate group
87	84	▼3	Sampyo	Jeong Do-won	28	33	5.3	5.2	publicly disclosed corporate group
88	-	New	Sajo	Joo Jin-woo	40	-	5.3	5.1	publicly disclosed corporate group
89	87	▼2	Wonik	Lee Young-han	47	54	5.3	5.1	publicly disclosed corporate group
90	-	New	Bithumb	Lee Jeong-hoon	20	-	5.2	5.1	publicly disclosed corporate group
91	-	New	EUKOR	EUKOR	2	-	5.1	5	publicly disclosed corporate group
92	73	▼19	Youngone	Sung Gi-hak	20	50	5	4.9	publicly disclosed corporate group
-	-	Excluded	Kumho Asiana	Park Sam-gu	-	24	-	17.4	publicly disclosed corporate group

== Corporate governance ==
=== Management structure ===
South Korea's chaebols are often compared with Japan's keiretsu business groupings, the successors of the pre-war zaibatsu, but they have had some major differences:

Differences	Chaebol	Keiretsu	Ref.
Control	mostly family	professional corporate management	
Banks	"prevented from buying controlling shares"	worked with affiliated bank, granting almost credit access	
Component sourcing	formed subsidiaries for export production	"often employed outside contractors"	

The chaebol model is heavily reliant on a complex system of interlocking ownership. The owner, with the help of family members, family-owned charities, and senior managers from subsidiaries, has to control only three or four public companies, which control other companies that in turn control subsidiaries. A good example of this practice would be the owner of Doosan, who controlled more than 20 subsidiaries with only minor participation in about 5 companies.

=== Equity ===
The chairman of a typical chaebol possesses a small portion of the equity in the companies under the large umbrella of the chaebol but is very powerful in making decisions and controls all management. For example, Samsung owns 0.5% of the group's listed firms. This demonstrates a weakness in the rule of law. The method that allows this type of possession is called cross-holding, which is a horizontal and vertical structure that enhances the control of the chairman.

=== Workplace culture ===
The typical culture of a chaebol is highly paternalistic. Much of the environment is defined by the chairman who acts as a "fatherly figure" to his subordinates. This can be traced back to Neo-Confucian values that permeate Korean society. A chaebol head's demeanour towards his employee can be described as "loving" while maintaining "sternness and a sense of responsibility". Workers commit to long hours, most notably on weekends and holidays, to appease their superiors. Company outings and drinking sessions tend to be compulsory to foster a sense of family and belonging among employees. Employers believe that enhancing a common bond between them will translate into prosperity and productivity for the company. Other practices that would be uncommon for Western workplaces to engage in include gift-giving to employees and arranging dates for workers in search of relationships or marriage.

Chaebols are notoriously hierarchical. As such, it is unusual for an individual to challenge or question the decision-making of his or her boss. This dynamic adds to the culture that orients itself around whoever is in charge but can lead to undesirable circumstances. For example, the Asiana flight 214 crash led critics to speculate that cultural factors prevented a pilot on board from aborting the low-speed landing and thus straying from his superior's commands. Promotion is rarely merit-based. Rather, it is through the order of age and time served to the conglomerate. This is reflected by the fact that most executives are far older than their employees. If a worker does not attain an executive or senior-management role by the age of fifty, he or she is commonly forced to resign. Again, this is attributable to the age-hierarchy dynamics in Korean Confucian culture. A typical firm heavily emphasizes loyalty to the firm, as demonstrated in the standard recruiting process. Newly acquired employees undergo an intense initiation that includes activities such as training camps and singing company-unique songs that reiterate the production goals of the firm.

=== Emergence and inflation ===
The origins of the modern chaebol system in South Korea came as a consequence of the Korean War. The war resulted in much destruction and halted industrial production, which led the government to print money to pay for the war and meet the requirements of the United Nations forces for the Korean currency, all of which caused mass inflation. This inflation caused many commodity prices to double every six months.

The government had to react and so devised a plan in providing strong financial incentives to private companies between the 1960s and 1970s. These included the government's choosing to select various family businesses to distribute the incentives (imported raw materials, commodities, bank loans). The impact was immediate, and most of the businesses flourished rapidly. The protection of infant companies allowed them to develop because of the highly regulated market, which prevented foreign companies from entering. Many companies that were not in the circle of businesses saw the system as flawed and corrupted. Corruption scandals have occurred periodically in all chaebols. Such incidents suggest a form of "crony capitalism" which is common in developing countries.

=== Internal market transactions accountability ===
Because the government gave out incentives to help businesses, it had a lot of control over them. However, there was no way to ensure the businesses would use the incentives effectively and efficiently. In other words, there was no external monitoring system to monitor chaebols and ensure that they were efficient in the allocation of resources. All businesses undertake internal market transactions, which constitute "purchase and sale of intermediate inputs, the provision and receipt of loan collaterals, and the provision and receipt of payment guarantees among member firms in a business group". There is the question of efficiency, especially in production and management. Therefore, the chaebol system was not very transparent. Behind the scenes, businesses were provided with subsidiary financing and intragroup transactions. This allowed them easy loans to cover their deficits, and before the 1997 Asian financial crisis, huge debts had accumulated, many of which were hidden. That gave the illusion that the system was flourishing into the 1990s.

=== Relationship with foreign investors ===
According to the Defense Language Institute Foreign Language Center, the majority of South Korea's economy is driven by exports. South Korea is one of the leading exporters worldwide. Additionally, the majority of investors in the Korean stock market are foreign investors. Out of 711 listed companies in the Korean stock market, approximately 683 have shares that are held by foreign investors. Nearly a third of the market's value is owned by foreigners, a trend that is expected to continue.

Because of their major role in the Korean stock market, foreign investors play a massive part in whether or not chaebol conglomerates remain financially successful. Foreign investors tend to avoid chaebols, especially those that displayed heavy political influence in South Korea, like Samsung and Hyundai. Investors are reluctant to invest in large control-ownership disparity businesses because these companies tended to cheat shareholders to have higher personal financial gain. This information is extremely helpful, especially when it comes to determining how these corrupt conglomerates are still heavily supported, considering foreign investors show little interest in them. However, a study published in the Journal of the Japanese and International Economies found that after the 1997 Asian financial crisis, foreign investment behavioural patterns changed drastically. While foreign investors like to hold shares in large companies with high profit and liquidity margins, they do not show any particular interest in either chaebol or non-chaebol companies. As of January 2025, many Chaebol corporations have a high share of foreign investors, with Samsung Electronics at 73%, Hyundai Motors at 50%, and SK Hynics at 55.8%. Nonetheless, chaebols are still able to survive, highlighting just how much power and aid they receive from the Korean government.

=== "Too big to fail" ===
During the 1997 Asian financial crisis, bankers feared that chaebols would go bankrupt so they allowed these businesses to roll over their loans each time they were unable to repay their debts. Many did not believe that the chaebols were capable of collapsing and that the more they borrowed, the safer they were.

However, the theory was proven wrong when many businesses collapsed during the crisis. Since they were linked through debt guarantees, many of the companies fell into a chain reaction. The focus on capacity expansion created debt that was manageable when the economy was growing. However, when the economy stalled, debt-to-equity ratios became a huge problem.

Since the crisis, chaebols had less debt and were less vulnerable to similar crises, as was demonstrated in the 2008 crisis. With the growth of the fewer remaining chaebols, however, each of them occupies a larger portion of the economy, with the largest chaebols making up (by sales revenue) a substantial portion of South Korea's GDP.

=== Monopolistic behavior ===
The protectionist policies and preferable government treatment granted chaebols the ability to exhibit monopolistic behaviour. The absence of a market free of intervention meant that "true competition" became a rarity in South Korea. Especially in the era before the 1997 Asian financial crisis, the only products available to the Korean people were those made by chaebols. Therefore, the social fabric of the country lacked a welcoming culture toward entrepreneurship. The intensity and extent of market concentration became evident as 80% of the country's GDP is derived from chaebols. The largest of the group, Samsung, exports 20% of South Korea's goods and services alone. Although no longer financially supported by the government, these firms have attained economies of scale on such a massive level that it is extremely difficult for a startup or small or medium enterprise (SME) to surmount the high barriers to entry. A majority of these smaller companies ended up becoming acquired by the chaebols, thereby further stacking their size and economic dominance. During recent years a growing trend to scale globally has increased among aspiring Korean entrepreneurs. Conversely, chaebols have also been moving money abroad with the tacit endorsement of the South Korean government and investing in commercial enterprises, particularly in Koreatown Manhattan, New York City.

To this day, chaebols maintain dominance across all industries. Reductions in tariffs and the removal of trade regulations designed to protect Korean conglomerates have led to increased competition from abroad. However, among domestic firms, chaebols have kept their market share intact. Most notably, Apple's entry into the smartphone market pressured rival Samsung into diversifying its revenue streams from overseas. All but 3 of the top 50 firms listed on the Korean Stock Exchange are designated as chaebols, and despite chaebols only accounting for just over 10 per cent of the country's workers, the four largest chaebols hold 70 per cent of total market capitalization, and all chaebols together holding 77 per cent as of the late 2010s. Consequently, chaebols have more bargaining power and often take pricing action that squeezes both suppliers and consumers. Typically the firms down the supply chain fail to increase their profit margins enough to expand and thus never see growth. Collusion among chaebols is commonplace. Price-fixing acts mean consumers expect to pay an inflated value for most goods and services. For instance, in 2012 Samsung and LG Electronics were fined for colluding to raise prices for home appliances.

=== Government ties, corruption, and abuse of power ===
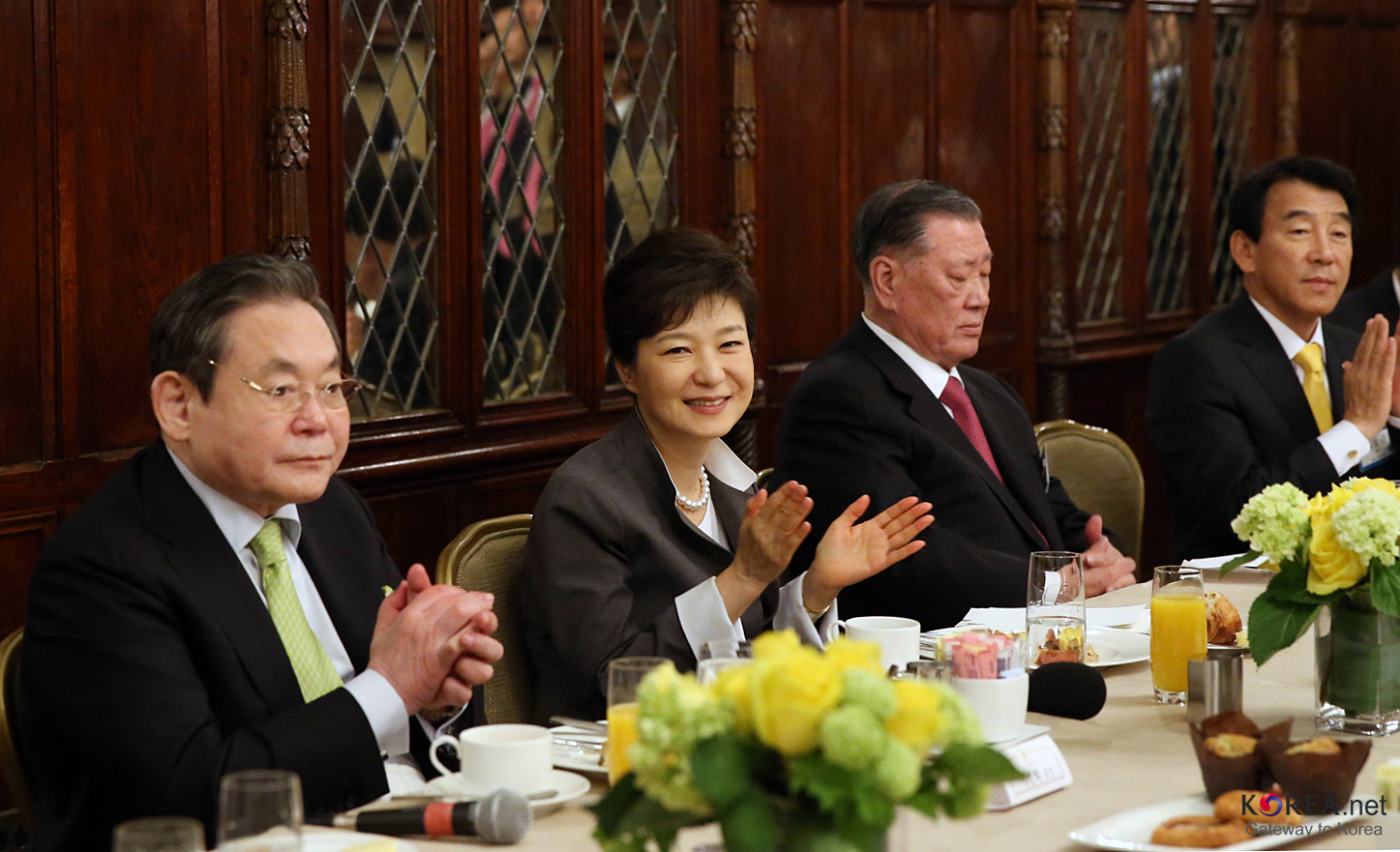
South Korean President Park Geun-hye at a breakfast meeting with business magnates Lee Kun-hee and Chung Mong-koo

Since the inception of the chaebol, the government has been closely involved in its affairs. Many of the reforms enacted over the years, especially those under President Kim Dae-Jung, have cracked down on kickbacks and preferential treatment. Moreover, the state is no longer a majority shareholder of any chaebol. But their sheer size and wealth have been used to gain influence. For the most part, the government sees the function of chaebols as crucial to the Korean economy. When President Lee Myung-Bak took office, he pardoned Samsung Group chairman Lee Kun-Hee for tax evasion. President Lee then proceeded to champion pro-chaebol deals, including a nuclear energy contract with the city of Abu Dhabi, and loosened laws preventing the conglomerates from owning financial services companies. Samsung's leader is not the only chaebol chairman to be excused from a criminal conviction. Choi Tae-Won of SK Group, Chung Mong-Koo of Hyundai, Kim Seung-Youn of Hanwha, and Shin Dong-bin of Lotte are a few examples of chairmen who have been charged, convicted, or are currently serving a prison sentence for white-collar crime. Accusations include bribery, tax evasion, accounting fraud, embezzlement, and violent crime. Typically chaebol chairmen are pardoned of any crimes. In the rare case that an executive is sentenced to prison, as the CEOs of SK and CJ Group were, it is typically a relatively light punishment of up to 4 years depending on the charge.

Collusion between chaebol members and the government granted preferential statuses to the companies. A chaebol would funnel bribes to politicians and bureaucrats through slush funds and illegal donations. This could help maintain the government's position of power, allowing them to secure contracts for major government projects and provide favourable treatment to the donor firm. Examples of this type of corruption were widespread in the years leading up to the 1997 Asian financial crisis. Many of the firms that benefited from this relationship were too indebted, had poor corporate governance, and were inefficient. There was a huge inflow of capital and a bending of regulation in favour of these problematic firms. For example, in the 1990s, Hanbo Group, formerly South Korea's second-largest steel-maker, paid for special arrangements with high-ranking politicians so that it could secure contracts for large government projects over its competitors. Hanbo went bankrupt in 1997 after defaulting on debt payments along with other governance issues. Numerous chaebol companies had similar private agreements with the government in this fashion. It would be most common in companies dealing with heavy industries or projects that involved government procurement and urban planning. In the past, most successful political elections were won with chaebol support. Each time a new administration or regime stepped in, it would gear its policy platform towards chaebol revitalization. This was under the claim that to be a competitive economy more power must be given to the chaebols. In recent years, the leading political parties of South Korea have shifted their focus from supporting large corporations to promoting economic diversification.

== Reforms ==
Different reforms have been proposed or enacted to deal with the influence, power, and corruption associated with the chaebols, though it has been questioned whether real reform is possible.

=== IMF agreement ===
Under Kim Dae-Jung and after the 1997 Asian financial crisis, many reforms were made to the chaebols. Most of these changes pertained to corporate structure, transparency in financial reporting, cuts in government subsidies, corporate governance, and debt stabilization. In 1997, the IMF provided a bailout loan of $60 billion conditional on revision. Distressed financial institutions were to be closed down and those that were deemed viable were to be restructured and recapitalized by the levels it set forth. This affected the chaebol because it severely restricted its easy access to financing which led to over-leveraged balance sheets. Lenient accounting practices and disclosure rules were to be strengthened and standardized for international practice. Hence, transparency was increased to what would be expected from a public company. The chaebols agreed to be subject to independent auditors and were obligated to provide consolidated financial statements regularly. The IMF agreement brought about the following changes. First, the authority to establish and implement accounting standards, previously centered on financial supervisory authorities and the government, was transferred to a private, independent organization. Second, the adoption of International Financial Reporting Standards (IFRS). Adapted to the domestic context, these standards were adopted as K-IFRS, which was selectively applied starting in 2009 and then expanded to include listed companies and others in 2011, gradually expanding their application. This brought about changes that enhanced the international comparability of financial information and the accuracy of disclosure. Third, the external audit and disclosure system was strengthened. The revision of the External Audit Act mandated consolidated financial statements, introduced provisions related to internal accounting management, and expanded auditors' responsibility for internal accounting audits. To overcome the chaebol-dominated oligarchy, the accounting and disclosure improvements introduced by the IMF agreement primarily reduced information asymmetry and strengthened external oversight. As accounting and disclosure standards were standardized, investors, creditors, and regulators were able to more accurately assess a company's financial status, which increased market surveillance pressure on insiders. Furthermore, the strengthened disclosure requirements for corporate transactions made it easier for external parties to verify abnormal transactions within the group, reducing incentives for insider-only (tunneling) activities. Finally, accurate accounting information helped supervisory agencies like the Financial Supervisory Service identify links between insolvent companies and affiliates, thereby weakening collusion between politics and business.

=== Government-led reforms and the 2008 crisis ===
Kim Dae-Jung enacted what is known as the "Five Principles of Corporate Governance". These were the enhancement of management transparency, strengthening owner-manager accountability, elimination of cross-debt guarantees among chaebol affiliates, improvement of capital structures, and consolidation of core business areas. In his plans, debt-to-equity ratios was to be below 200%. Chaebol subsidiaries that were debt-laden or on the verge of bankruptcy were instructed to be either liquidated, sold, or put up for merger. Each chaebol-holding group had to break up its subsidiaries and operations so that they were more manageable. By the end of 1997, each had an average of 26.8 subsidiaries. It was hoped that if there were fewer activities, the quality of the remaining businesses would see improvement. Many unrelated branches to their core competencies were swiftly shed. If any of the conglomerates failed to meet the conditions by the set deadlines, strict sanctions would be passed against them. During the 2008 financial crisis, many of these reforms ensured chaebols' quick recovery. Having had exposure to a massive recession before, they learned to cope better than those in foreign countries. With significantly healthier balance sheets and higher cash reserves, the chaebols were able to avoid any liquidity issues. Moreover, with fewer subsidiaries, they were less exposed to the full scope of the crisis and thus helped keep the Korean economy afloat. President Kim Dae-jung's five principles of corporate governance had several impacts on mitigating the chaebol oligarchy. First, they enhanced management transparency. Strengthening the board of directors and auditing functions, along with defining management accountability, could provide institutional restraints against the autocracy of the owner family. Second, they established a professional management system. The five principles of corporate governance created pressure to limit the direct management of the owner family and expand the decision-making power of professional managers. This can be seen in President Kim Dae-jung's strong insistence that Korean Air be transformed into a professional management system. This professional management system effectively limited the personal power of chaebol leaders, i.e., their political and economic oligarchy. Furthermore, the ban on cross-subsidy guarantees between affiliates and the strengthened disclosure of related-party transactions weakened the political and financial safeguards against excessive leverage by chaebols.

President Roh Moo Hyun pushed for even more extensive reform. His administration passed stringent regulations on fraudulent accounting, stock manipulation, and irregular wealth succession. Chaebols were forced to improve objectivity on their board of directors. Rather than having the decision-makers be insiders, affiliates, or family members, chaebols were expected to hold representation that reflected the interests of investors, especially minority shareholders who gained a significant number of rights. As a result, it became easier for chaebols to raise capital through equity rather than riskier debt. This is because the new transparency laws and restructuring boosted investor confidence from abroad. The Roh Moo-hyun administration also took steps to strengthen oversight and enhance transparency of corporations and chaebols. Specifically, it revised the Monopoly Regulation and Fair Trade Act (the Monopoly Regulation and Fair Trade Act). It also enacted the Securities Class Action Act. Furthermore, it revised the Inheritance Tax and Gift Tax Acts, demonstrating efforts to improve the governance, investment structure, and disclosure practices of chaebols. However, some argue that the pace of reform slowed in the latter half of his term, and the total investment limit system was never fully implemented.

== Regulation ==
Some competition laws were passed to attempt to limit the expansion of chaebol:

- Law for separate finance from industry (금산분리법; 金産分離法): Chaebols may no longer have banks since 1982
- Law for the limit of investment (출자총액제한; 出資總額制限): A chaebol's growth by M&A was limited until 2009
- Law for the limit of assurance (상호출자채무보증제한; 相互出資債務保證制限): Defends the insolvency of a chaebol's affiliates

=== Law for separate finance from industry ===
During the government-led growth process, a structure emerged in which industrial capital, such as conglomerates, owned or controlled financial companies, posing a risk of industrial capital dominating finance. This could lead to affiliate-centered internal transactions, low-interest loans, and preferential lending, further expanding the economic power and capital control of a small number of conglomerates. In essence, this would lead to an oligarchy-like governance structure centered on conglomerates, which could threaten the soundness of the entire financial system. To prevent this, the Financial and Industrial Separation Act was introduced to separate financial and industrial capital. This system began to be institutionalized in Korea in the 1980s, restricting industrial capital from owning a certain percentage of bank shares. Since then, the Financial Holding Companies Act and the Monopoly Regulation and Fair Trade Act have developed institutional frameworks to restrict industrial capital's control over financial companies and financial capital's control over industrial capital. Recent discussions are examining strengthening measures, such as the separation of financial affiliates and stock ownership restrictions for general and financial holding companies. These regulations on the separation of finance and industry have served to institutionally control the internal capital transfers, low-cost lending, and unfair support for affiliates that arise from the ownership and control of financial companies by conglomerates through industrial capital. These regulations have also served to limit the oligarchic structure in which conglomerates use financial companies as their private vaults to simultaneously expand their economic and political power.

=== Law for the limit of investment ===
The Investment Limit Act is more accurately known as the Total Investment Limit System. Korean conglomerates have created a structure in which minority owners and controlling shareholders control numerous affiliates with relatively small stakes through circular investment among affiliates, expanded equity investment, and a control structure through investment. This was recognized as an oligarchic concentration of economic power and a chain reaction of risks across the entire group. The Total Investment Limit System was introduced as an institutional mechanism to control this structural risk. This system was first introduced through the amendment to the Monopoly Regulation and Fair Trade Act in December 1986 and went into effect in April 1987. The core provision of the Act is a ceiling provision that prohibits companies belonging to large conglomerates from using more than a certain percentage of their net assets for equity investments in other domestic companies. This provision was later abolished in 1998 due to concerns about its effectiveness and changing economic conditions, but was reintroduced in 1999. Opinions are divided on the effectiveness of the system in alleviating oligarchy. Some argue that excessive investment by large conglomerates is gradually being curbed, with the investment-to-net-asset ratio approaching 25%. However, others argue that it is difficult to assess the improvement in investment behavior, as there are instances of intensified circular investment among affiliates.

=== Law for the limit of assurance ===
The correct name for the Guarantee Limit Act is the "Debt Guarantee Limit System." Debt guarantees and cross-guarantees among affiliates of Korean conglomerates were feared to pose risks to financial supervision and the concentration of economic power. To prevent this, the Debt Guarantee Limit System was introduced. Article 24 of the Monopoly Regulation and Fair Trade Act stipulates, "Domestic companies belonging to conglomerates subject to cross-shareholding restrictions shall not guarantee the debt of their affiliates." However, this prohibits "inter-affiliate debt guarantees" for conglomerates with a certain total asset value. For example, this applies to groups with total assets exceeding 5 trillion won. This system served to institutionally control the mechanism by which conglomerates, through guarantees between affiliates, transferred internal funds and shared risks across the entire group, thereby strengthening the concentration of economic power. Indeed, since the system's introduction in 1998, the amount of inter-affiliate debt guarantees within conglomerates subject to cross-shareholding restrictions has steadily declined. Previously, conglomerates provided low-interest guarantees to their affiliates, which in turn formed a circulating capital network for the entire conglomerate. Therefore, this system served as an institutional mechanism to weaken the oligarchic control established by a small number of conglomerate owners through guarantees and investment networks between affiliates.

Formally, the Korea Fair Trade Commission announces a limited chaebol list every year by size of industrial assets (not including financial companies).

- Appointment: Korea Fair Trade Commission
- Inclusion: industrial groups (assets: 5 trillion won or more)
- Exclusion: bank and financial groups

Chaebols with limited assurance (상호출자제한기업집단; 相互出資制限企業集團)
Year	Chaebols	Affiliates	Assets
2007	62	1,196 Ent	979.7 trillion won (Not including bank and financial group by South Korean law)
2008	79	1,680 Ent	1,161.5 trillion won (more than 2 trillion won)
2009	48	1,137 Ent	1,310.6 trillion won (more than 5 trillion won)
Samsung Group's total assets are 317 trillion won, but the FTC recognizes only 174 trillion won, which excludes financial subsidiaries.

== Education ==
Most chaebol founders did not study abroad. By the 2000s, it had become increasingly common for chaebol children to study at foreign universities. The proportion for bachelor’s degrees was approximately 50% by the late 2010s, with rates for master’s degrees being much higher.

Universities with the most chaebol attendees (Note: alumni included)
Year	Domestic	Foreign	Ref.
2018	Yonsei University	Boston University	
2026	Korea University	Columbia University	

== Lists of chaebols ==
The following tables list chaebols by category.

=== Owned by family groups ===
List of major chaebols by family group
Family group	Operating groups
Lee Byung-chul family group	Samsung Group, Shinsegae Group, CJ Group, JoongAng Group, BGF Group, Hansol Group, and others
Chung Ju-yung family group	Hyundai Motor Group, Hyundai Heavy Industries Group, Hyundai Department Store Group, Hyundai Marine & Fire, Hyundai Sungwoo Holdings, Halla Group, HDC Group, HL Mando, KCC Corporation, and others
Koo In-hwoi family group	LG, GS Group, LS Group, LX Group, LIG Group, Ourhome Corp, LF Group, LT Group, Heesung Electronics, and others
Shin Kyuk-ho family group	Lotte Group, Nongshim, Pulemil, and others
Cho Choong-hoon family group	Hanjin Group, Meritz Financial Group, and others
Park In-chon family group	Kumho Asiana Group, Kumho Petrochemical, Kumho Tire, and others
Chaebols that are not in any family group	SK Group, Hanwha Group, Doosan Group, Hankook, HiteJinro, Kakao, Naver, Amorepacific Corporation, Hybe, E-Land Group, Samyang Group, Orion Corporation, Ottogi, KG Group, OCI Group, Kyobo Life Insurance, Hyosung Group, Daelim Group, Young Poong Group, Dongwon Group, DB Group, Kolon Industries, Taekwang Group, Seah Holdings, SeAh Steel Holdings, Dongkuk Steel, Aekyung Group, Eugene Group, Iljin Group, Booyoung Group, Harim Group, Taeyoung Engineering, Hoban Group, and others.

=== Multiple monopolies ===
Business area: chaebols that have several monopolies
Group	Number of affiliates	Major businesses
Samsung Group	60	Electronics, semiconductors, batteries, IT Solutions, construction, shipbuilding, insurance
SK Group	186	Energy, chemicals, telecom, semiconductors, batteries, trading, biopharmaceuticals
Hyundai Motor Group	57	Automobiles, auto parts, steel, construction, logistics, credit card
LG	73	Electronics, batteries, chemicals, telecom, display, food, cosmetics
Lotte Group	85	Retail, food, entertainment, hotels, chemicals, construction, tourism
Hanwha Group	91	Explosives, aerospace, energy, insurance, chemicals, hotels, construction
GS Group	93	Energy, retail, hotels, construction, trading
Hyundai Heavy Industries Group	36	Shipbuilding, engineering, heavy industries, construction equipment, energy, robotics
Shinsegae Group	53	Retail, food, hotels, entertainment, fashion
CJ Group	85	Food, retail, logistics, biopharmaceuticals, entertainment
Hanjin Group	33	Aviation, logistics, transportation, hotels, info systems, airports

=== Affiliates ===
List of well-known chaebol affiliates (revenue and assets in 2021)
Unit	Parent	Revenue (trillion KRW)	Total assets (trillion KRW)	Industries
Samsung Electronics	Samsung Group	279.6	426.6	Electronics, semiconductors, smartphones, appliances
Samsung Life Insurance	Samsung Group	35.1	341.4	Insurance
Samsung C&T	Samsung Group	34.5	55.2	Construction, trading, hotels
Samsung Fire & Marine Insurance	Samsung Group	24.4	94.9	Insurance
Samsung SDI	Samsung Group	13.6	25.8	Batteries
Samsung SDS	Samsung Group	13.6	10.5	IT Solutions
Samsung Electro-Mechanics	Samsung Group	9.7	9.9	Electronics, electronic components
Hotel Shilla	Samsung Group	3.8	2.6	Hotels, duty-free, entertainment
Hyundai Motor Company	Hyundai Motor Group	117.6	233.6	Automobiles
Kia	Hyundai Motor Group	69.9	66.8	Automobiles
Hyundai Mobis	Hyundai Motor Group	41.7	51.5	Auto parts
Hyundai Steel	Hyundai Motor Group	22.8	37.1	Steel
Hyundai Engineering & Construction	Hyundai Motor Group	18.1	19.6	Construction
Hyundai Glovis	Hyundai Motor Group	21.8	12.2	Logistics
SK Hynix	SK Group	42.9	96.3	Semiconductors
SK Innovation	SK Group	46.8	49.5	Energy, batteries,
SK Telecom	SK Group	16.7	30.9	Telecom
SK Networks	SK Group	11.1	9.4	Trading, logistics
LG Electronics	LG Group	74.7	53.5	Electronics
LG Chem	LG Group	42.7	51.1	Chemicals
LG Display	LG Group	29.8	38.2	Display
LG Energy Solution	LG	17.9	23.8	Batteries
LG Uplus	LG	13.9	19.4	Telecom
Lotte Shopping	Lotte Group	15.6	33.4	Retail
Lotte Chemical	Lotte Group	18.1	22.9	Chemicals
Lotte Hotels & Resorts	Lotte Group	4.2	18.3	Hotels
Lotte Life Insurance	Lotte Group	3.5	18.9	Insurance
Lotte Chilsung	Lotte Group	2.5	3.6	Food
Hanwha Corporation	Hanwha Group	52.8	202.3	Defense systems, explosives, aerospace
Hanwha Life Insurance	Hanwha Group	27.1	163.6	Insurance
Hanwha Solutions	Hanwha Group	10.7	20.0	Renewable energy
GS Caltex	GS Group	34.5	23.6	Energy
GS Construction	GS Group	9.1	15.2	Construction
GS Retail	GS Group	9.8	9.5	Retail
Hyundai Heavy Industries	Hyundai Heavy Industries Group	8.3	13.8	shipbuilding, heavy industries
Hyundai Mipo Dockyard	Hyundai Heavy Industries Group	2.9	4.3	shipbuilding, heavy industries
Hyundai Samho Heavy Industries	Hyundai Heavy Industries Group	4.1	5.0	shipbuilding, heavy industries
Hyundai Oilbank	Hyundai Heavy Industries Group	20.6	18.2	Energy
Shinsegae	Shinsegae Group	6.3	13.6	Retail, duty-free, department stores
E-mart	Shinsegae Group	24.9	31.2	Retail, food
Josun Hotels & Resorts	Shinsegae Group	0.3107	1.6	Hotels
CJ CheilJedang	CJ Group	26.3	26.9	Food, biochemicals
CJ Daehan Express	CJ Group	11.3	8.9	Logistics
CJ E&M	CJ Group	3.6	7.9	Entertainment
CJ CGV	CJ Group	0.736	3.8	Movie theaters
Korean Air	Hanjin Group	9.1	26.7	Airlines
Asiana Airlines	Hanjin Group	4.3	13.1	Airlines
Hanjin	Hanjin Group	2.5	3.9	Logistics

== Depictions in popular culture ==
Like many other conglomerates across the world, Korean chaebols have a presence in popular media. There are a large number of K-dramas that feature chaebols and chaebol family members. Some of these dramas, including Business Proposal, Coffee Prince, What's Wrong with Secretary Kim, King the Land, and Strong Girl Boon-soon, depict chaebol family members being humble and kind. Other dramas including Innocent Defendant, Remember, Vincenzo, Reborn Rich, Big Mouth, Queenmaker and Marry My Husband depict chaebol family members being materialistic and arrogant. The differences in the depiction of chaebol family members across dramas reflects the income inequality and political corruption associated with chaebols in South Korea.

In addition, many chaebol family members have taken to social media outlets like Instagram and Twitter, where they publish snippets of their personal lives. Some chaebols also partake in popular social media trends like mukbangs, as seen on Ham Yon-Ji's YouTube channel, 햄연지 YONJIHAM. Some have suggested that these attempts at humanizing chaebols are purely financial strategies.

In 1998, the Swedish pop band Vacuum released its second studio album, titled Seance at the Chaebol.

== See also ==
- Conglomerate
- Economy of South Korea
- Family business
- Four big families of Hong Kong
- Four big families of the Republic of China
- Holding company
- Horizontal integration
- Keiretsu
- List of South Korean companies
- Megacorporation
- Miracle on the Han River
- National champions
- Vertical integration
- Zaibatsu
