= DL Group =

South Korean conglomerate

DL Holdings Co., Ltd.
- Native name: 디엘 주식회사
- Company type: Public
- Traded as: KRX: 000210
- Founded: October 1939; 86 years ago
- Headquarters: Seoul, South Korea
- Subsidiaries: DL E&C
- Website: www.dlholdings.co.kr

Daelim logo until 2020

DL Group or DL Holdings Co., Ltd. (Korean: 디엘 주식회사) is a conglomerate based in Seoul, South Korea. DL's major business includes chemical and construction.

== See also ==
- List of South Korean companies
- Chaebol
