= Namhae Chemical Corporation =

- Hangul: 남해화학
- Hanja: 南海化學
- RR: Namhae hwahak
- MR: Namhae hwahak

Namhae Chemical Corporation is a large South Korean company which produces fertilizers and chemicals. The company, established in 1974, is headquartered in Yeosu, Jeollanam-do, and operates a branch office in Jung-gu, Seoul.

== See also ==
- List of South Korean companies
- Economy of South Korea

== Notes ==
1. "본사와 영업소". Namhae Chemical Corporation website.
