= Small and medium enterprises in South Korea =

Small and medium-sized enterprises (SMEs) form the backbone of South Korea’s economy, accounting for 99.9% of all businesses in the country and employing over 80% of the workforce. As of recent estimates, there are more than 7.7 million SMEs in South Korea, employing approximately 18.49 million people, or 81% of the total workforce. In 2021, SMEs generated total revenues of 3,017 trillion KRW, representing a 12.8% increase from the previous year and contributing 46.9% of the nation’s total corporate revenue. Notably, since 2015, the classification criteria for SMEs have shifted from employee count to annual revenue, reflecting their growing significance in the economy.

== Scope of SME ==
Scope of Small and Medium Enterprises
Main Business		Code	Small and Medium Enterprises (Average Sales)	Small Enterprise (Average Sales)
Manufacturing (6 business types)	Manufacturing of clothing, clothing accessories, and fur products	C14	KRW 150 billion or less	KRW 12 billion or less
Manufacturing (6 business types)	Manufacturing of leather, bags, and shoes	C15	KRW 150 billion or less	KRW 12 billion or less
Manufacturing (6 business types)	Manufacturing of pulp, paper, and paper products	C17	KRW 150 billion or less	KRW 12 billion or less
Manufacturing (6 business types)	Primary metal manufacturing	C24	KRW 150 billion or less	KRW 8 billion or less
Manufacturing (6 business types)	Electrical equipment manufacturing	C28	KRW 150 billion or less	KRW 8 billion or less
Manufacturing (6 business types)	Furniture manufacturing	C32	KRW 150 billion or less	KRW 8 billion or less
Agriculture, forestry, and fisheries		A	KRW 100 billion or less	KRW 8 billion or less
Mining		B	KRW 100 billion or less	KRW 8 billion or less
Manufacturing (12 business types)	Food manufacturing	C10	KRW 100 billion or less	KRW 12 billion or less
Manufacturing (12 business types)	Tobacco manufacturing	C12	KRW 100 billion or less	KRW 8 billion or less
Manufacturing (12 business types)	Textile product manufacturing (excluding clothing manufacturing)	C13	KRW 100 billion or less	KRW 8 billion or less
Manufacturing (12 business types)	Timber and wood product manufacturing (excluding furniture manufacturing)	C16	KRW 100 billion or less	KRW 8 billion or less
Manufacturing (12 business types)	Manufacturing of coke, briquettes, and refined petroleum products	C19	KRW 100 billion or less	KRW 12 billion or less
Manufacturing (12 business types)	Chemicals and chemical product manufacturing (excluding medicine manufacturing)	C20	KRW 100 billion or less	KRW 12 billion or less
Manufacturing (12 business types)	Rubber and plastic product manufacturing	C22	KRW 100 billion or less	KRW 8 billion or less
Manufacturing (12 business types)	Metalwork product manufacturing (excluding machine and furniture manufacturing)	C25	KRW 100 billion or less	KRW 12 billion or less
Manufacturing (12 business types)	Manufacturing of electronic parts, computers, video, audio, and communications equipment	C26	KRW 100 billion or less	KRW 12 billion or less
Manufacturing (12 business types)	Manufacturing of other machines and equipment	C29	KRW 100 billion or less	KRW 12 billion or less
Manufacturing (12 business types)	Automobile and trailer manufacturing	C30	KRW 100 billion or less	KRW 12 billion or less
Manufacturing (12 business types)	Manufacturing of other transportation equipment	C31	KRW 100 billion or less	KRW 8 billion or less
Supply of electricity, gas, steam, and air conditioning		D	KRW 100 billion or less	KRW 12 billion or less
Waterworks		E36	KRW 100 billion or less	KRW 12 billion or less
Construction		F	KRW 100 billion or less	KRW 8 billion or less
Wholesale and retail businesses		G	KRW 100 billion or less	KRW 5 billion or less
Manufacturing (6 business types)	Beverage manufacturing	C11	KRW 80 billion or less	KRW 12 billion or less
Manufacturing (6 business types)	Printing and recording media duplication	C18	KRW 80 billion or less	KRW 8 billion or less
Manufacturing (6 business types)	Manufacturing of medical materials and pharmaceuticals	C21	KRW 80 billion or less	KRW 12 billion or less
Manufacturing (6 business types)	Manufacturing of nonmetallic mineral products	C23	KRW 80 billion or less	KRW 12 billion or less
Manufacturing (6 business types)	Manufacturing of medical, precision, optics and clocks	C27	KRW 80 billion or less	KRW 8 billion or less
Manufacturing (6 business types)	Manufacturing of other products	C33	KRW 80 billion or less	KRW 8 billion or less
Water, sewage, and waste disposal, raw material recycling (excluding waterworks)		E(excluding E36)	KRW 80 billion or less	KRW 3 billion or less
Transportation and warehousing		H	KRW 80 billion or less	KRW 8 billion or less
Information and communications		J	KRW 80 billion or less	KRW 5 billion or less
Repair of industrial machinery and equipment		C34	KRW 60 billion or less	KRW 1 billion or less
Professional, scientific, and technical services		M	KRW 60 billion or less	KRW 3 billion or less
Business facility management, business support, and rental services (excluding rental businesses)		N(excluding N76)	KRW 60 billion or less	KRW 3 billion or less
Health and social welfare services		Q	KRW 60 billion or less	KRW 1 billion or less
Arts, sports and leisure services		R	KRW 60 billion or less	KRW 3 billion or less
Repair and other personal services		S	KRW 60 billion or less	KRW 1 billion or less
Accommodations and restaurants		I	KRW 40 billion or less	KRW 1 billion or less
Finance and insurance		K	KRW 40 billion or less	KRW 8 billion or less
Real estate businesses		L	KRW 40 billion or less	KRW 3 billion or less
Leasing businesses		N76	KRW 40 billion or less	KRW 3 billion or less
Education services		P	KRW 40 billion or less	KRW 1 billion or less
Manufacturing of new seats for automobiles		C30393	Average sales less than KRW 150 billion	Average sales less than KRW 12 billion
Manufacturing of rail vehicle seats among manufacturers of rail vehicle parts and related devices		C31202	Average sales less than KRW 150 billion	Average sales less than KRW 12 billion
Manufacturing of aircraft seats among aircraft part manufacturers		C31322	Average sales less than KRW 150 billion	Average sales less than KRW 12 billion

== List of SMEs in South Korea ==
Name (English)	Name (Korea)	Industry	sector	Headquarters	Founded
Naeil Shinmun	내일 신문	Consumer services	Media	Seoul	1993
Harrie Inc.	주시회사 해리	Telecommunications	Mobile telecommunications	Seoul	2016

== See also ==
- List of companies of South Korea
