= Crown Confectionery =

South Korean confectioners

- Founded: 1947; 78 years ago
- Headquarters: Seoul
- Parent: CrownHaitai Holdings

Korean name
- Hangul: 크라운제과
- RR: Keuraun jegwa
- MR: K'ŭraun chegwa

Crown Confectionery (Korean: 크라운제과, KRX: 264900) is a confectionery company headquartered in Jamwon-dong, Seocho District, Seoul, South Korea. It was established in 1947. Its manufacturing is based in Jungnang District, Seoul and Anyang, Gyeonggi. It is historically an old popular biscuit brand because they invented Sando and Big Pie. It is similar to Lotte Confectionery, Haitai which Crown Confectionery took over in 2004, and Orion Confectionery. Crown Confectionery produces biscuit, cookies, crackers, chocolates and other snacks and confectioneries division in 2017 Crown Confectionery, Change of existing company name Crown Haitai Hoildings.

== See also ==
- Economy of South Korea
- List of companies of South Korea
