= Aju Group =

- Hangul: 아주그룹
- RR: Aju geurup
- MR: Aju kŭrup

Aju Group (Korean: 아주그룹) is a large South Korean chaebol (conglomerate), offering chemical, industry, logistic, financial, hotel and rental products.

== History ==
Aju group started as Aju industries(아주산업) in 1960 as a construction which mainly did business on construction materials. In the 1960s, Aju helped replace wooden utility poles to concrete ones as part of the government's the "rural distribution of electricity" project. Starting from the 1970s they begin to sell hume pipes. In the 1980s, the company opened Ready-mix concrete factories in Mangu-dong.

== See also ==
- Economy of South Korea
