= Eugene Koryeo Cement =

South Korean cement company

Korea Cement Co, Ltd. (Korean: 고려시멘트) is a South Korean cement and chemical company, headquartered in Sinan-dong Buk-gu Gwangju, Korea. established in 1962. It is a manufacturer of cement products, and is under the Gangdong Group family. The CEO of Korea Cement is Lee Kuk No (이국노).

== Products ==
- Portland cement
- Slag cement

== Manufacturing network (South Korea) ==
- Jangseong
- Gwangyang

=== Sponsored help companies ===
- Hyundai Industry (Naju, Jeollanam-do)
- Hyundai Remicon (Gokseong, Jeollanam-do)
- Hyundai Holdings (Damyang, Jeollanam-do)
- Hyundai Concrete (Goheung, Jeollanam-do)
- Goheung Remicon (Goheung, Jeollanam-do)
- Heunghan Remicon (Hadong, Gyeongsangnam-do)
- Hyundai Industrial Development (Gwangsan-gu, Gwangju/Mokpo, Jeollanam-do)
- Honam Ascon (Muan, Jeollanam-do)

== See also ==
- Eugene Group
- Economy of South Korea
