= Mobile phone industry in South Korea =

The mobile phone industry in South Korea consists of the provision of domestic network infrastructure and the production of consumer mobile handsets.

== History ==
=== Car phone era ===
In 1984, Korea Mobile Telecommunications Service, a subsidiary of Korea Telecom that was later renamed to SK Telecom, started its mobile communications service with a car phone.

=== Network and service developments ===
- 1988: Korea Mobile Telecommunications Service started South Korea's first mobile phone service.
- 1996: Korea Mobile Telecommunications Service started the world's first cdmaOne service in Incheon. The same year, Korea Telecom Freetel (KTF), a subsidiary of Korea Telecom, began its service.
- 1997: Korea Mobile Telecommunications Service was sold to SK Group and changed its name to SK Telecom. The same year, LG Telecom launched its business.
- 2002: Korea Telecom Freetel merged with Internet companies invested by Samsung Group and became KTF.

=== Smartphone era ===
==== Consumer devices ====
In 2009, KT was the first network to introduce the iPhone to South Korea. The origins of South Korea's domestic smartphone production industry can be traced back to Samsung's release of their first smartphone, a reaction to Apple's iPhone, which was well-received by the South Korean population.

Later, as the smartphone sector continued to grow, South Korea's LG Electronics also joined the competition. Unlike Apple and Samsung, LG's business strategy was to make more affordable devices rather than devices with higher specifications. Eventually, LG shifted to offering phones with a better camera and higher screen quality, which increased their cost of goods. The sales of their phones, however, did not improve.

LG announced its decision to exit the smartphone market in April 2021 due to their continued net loss in this sector. Until now, Apple and Samsung have held the largest market shares, with LG trailing behind. Apple tried to capitalize on LG's exit of the smartphone market by advertising its products on LG's displays within markets. Samsung also took this opportunity to offer existing LG customers competitive deals on new Samsung phones, such as running trade-in events for used LG smartphones. Competition between the two manufacturers in the South Korean market is still on-going.

==== Network and service developments ====
- 2009: KTF merged with Korea Telecom.
- 2010: LG Telecom, LG Dacom, LG Powercom were merged into LG U Plus.
- 2012: KT shut down its 2G services and migrated to a 3G network.
- 2020: SKT shut down its 2G services and migrated to newer generation networks.
- New technology was developed such as WiBro and LTE

== Handsets ==
=== Domestic production ===
Current South Korean producers of mobile phones include:

- Samsung Electronics
- KT Tech

Former South Korean producers of mobile phones include:

- Pantech Curitel - ceased production in 2017
- LG Electronics - ceased production in 2021

=== Market share (domestic and imported handsets) ===
Samsung and Apple have the largest market shares in Korea.

== Mobile phone service providers ==
There are three mobile phone service providers and they are currently deploying their 5G networks.

- Korea Telecom (KT) absorbed KT Freetel (KTF) in 2002 and offers services using HSPA and LTE networks.
- LG U Plus (LG U+), a member of LG Group, also provides CDMA2000 and LTE networks.
- SK Telecom (SKT) of SK Group also offers services using HSPA and LTE networks. In 2020 the CDMA2000 network was shut down.

As of 2004 the market shares of the three companies were believed to be: SK Telecom with 50 percent of the market, Korea Telecom with 30 percent and LG Telecom with 20 percent.

== Official bodies and technical partnerships ==
The Ministry of Information and Communication (MIC) is the telecommunications authority.

The Electronics and Telecommunications Research Institute (ETRI) supports Qualcomm's research and development of CDMA and CDMA2000 technology.

Regarding the Korean mobile phone industry's overseas experiences, SK Telecom has helped the first mobile phone service companies in Mongolia, Uzbekistan, Cambodia, etc. In China, it helped China Unicom's CDMA implementation, both technically and financially.

== See also ==
- Telecommunications in South Korea
- List of telephone operating companies
- List of mobile network operators
- List of mobile phone makers
- Culture of South Korea: Cellular Phones
