= Isu Group =

South Korean conglomerate

Isu Co., Ltd.
- Native name: 주식회사 이수
- Founded: 1969; 57 years ago
- Headquarters: Seoul, South Korea
- Website: isu.co.kr

- Isu Group
- Hangul: 이수
- Hanja: 梨樹
- RR: Isu
- MR: Isu

Isu Co., Ltd. (or Isu Group; Korean: 주식회사 이수) is a South Korea-based business group engaged in the chemical, electronics, construction, and pharmaceutical industries.

== History ==
The history of the Isu Group began in 1969 with the establishment of Isu Chemical. Founded by chemistry professors from Ewha Womans University, the company focused on the production of raw materials for detergents and petrochemicals. In 1995, the company was acquired by Kim Joon-sung, the former governor of the Bank of Korea. Following this acquisition, the company began a process of diversification, eventually evolving into the multi-industry business group it is today. In 1995, the group expanded into the electronics sector by acquiring a printed circuit board (PCB) manufacturer, which was later renamed Isu Petasys.

== See also ==
- List of South Korean companies
