= Jungheung Group =

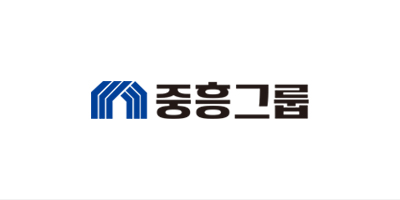
- Native name: 중흥그룹
- Founded: 1983
- Headquarters: Gwangju Metropolitan City Buk-gu Moodeung-ro 204
- Website: https://www.jungheung.co.kr/eng_/main.php

Jungheung Group (Korean: 중흥그룹) is a construction conglomerate based in South Korea. Jungheung construction projects have included rental apartments and public housing.

== History ==
In 2015, the CEO of Jungheung Construction (Jung Won-joo) was arrested on "the suspicion of raising slush funds."

In 2019, Jungheung Group secured 47.8 percent of the Herald Group.

Although it canceled its initial bid, Jungheung was selected by the Korea Development Bank to acquire Daewoo E&C after offering a reduced 2.1 trillion won in July 2021. The move was condemned by the Daewoo E&C labor union. In December, Jungheung agreed to purchase the controlling stake. Jungheung promised Daewoo E&C independent management but refused to sign the Daewoo E&C union's request for a written agreement. The union protested, rallying in front of Jungheung's headquarters. In February 2022, the union reached an agreement with Jungheung management and stopped protesting. By March, various Jungheung executives and relatives of the Jungheung vice chairman were appointed as leaders of Daewoo E&C.

In 2023, the Fair Trade Commission (South Korea) found that Jungheung had the most owner family members as unregistered board executives among conglomerates in the country. The practice has been criticized due to the lack of associated managerial responsibility. In December 2025, the FTC fined Jungheung Construction on allegations of free guarantees "to a company owned by a family member of the chairman" in relation to public land development projects.
