= Samsung Digital Imaging =

Korean optoelectronics company

- Native name: 삼성디지털이미징
- Company type: Public company
- Industry: Manufacturing
- Founded: February 4, 2009
- Defunct: April 1, 2010
- Headquarters: Seocho District, Seoul, South Korea
- Products: Compact digital cameras, digital single-lens reflex cameras

Samsung Digital Imaging (Korean: 삼성디지털이미징) is a Korean optoelectronics company.

It is one of the subsidiaries of Samsung Group, and it was spun off from Samsung Techwin's Optoelectronics part after February 2, 2009.
