= CJ KIFT =

South Korean logistics and shipping company

CJ KIFT Co, Ltd. (Korean: 씨제이한국복합물류, Shijei Hanguk Bokhap Mulryu) is a South Korean logistics and shipping company, headquartered in Bugok-dong Gunpo Gyeonggi-do and Taepyeong-Ro Jung-gu Seoul, South Korea. Established in 1998, it offered worldwide in logistics, freight and express service products. Its logistic center is based in Seoul and other Korea localities. The "CJ KIFT" CEO is Kim Jong Ho (김종호). The company is commonly referred to as "CJ KIFT" (for Cheil Jedang's Korea Integrated Freight Terminal).

== Business products ==
- LSP Product
- LRP Product
- Insourcing Product

== See also ==
- Economy of South Korea
- CJ Group
