= Green Optics Co., Ltd. =

- Type: Public
- Traded as: KRX: 0015G0
- Industry: Optics, Semiconductors
- Founded: 1997
- Founders: Hyunil Cho
- Headquarters: Ochang Science Venture Zone, 45, Gagri 1-gil, Ochang-eup, Cheongju-si Cheongwon-gu, Chungcheongbuk-do, South Korea
- Products: Optics: Design, Configuration, Polishing, Coating, Assembly, Measurement and Evaluation.
- Number of employees: 200
- Website: http://www.greenopt.com/en/index.php

Green Optics Co., Ltd.(그린광학) is a South Korean optics company with the capacity for planning, design, processing, coating, assembly and evaluation of optical items.

== History ==
1997: Established

1999: Incorporated

2001: ISO 9001 Certified

2005: Main factory built (Ochang, Cheongju-city, South Korea)

2006: ISO14001 Certified

2009: Partnership with Samsung

2011: Construction completed on Research and Development facility (Osong, Cheongju-si, South Korea). Awarded equipment management contract with South Korean Astronomy and Space Science Institute.

2014: Construction completed on Third Factory (Osong, Cheongju-si, South Korea).

2015: View Tomorrow (Vu:T) subsidiary company created.

2016: Construction completed on Fifth Factory --- Large Precision Optics (Osong, Cheongju-si, South Korea). Zinc Sulfide lens released to domestic and international market.

2025: KOSDAQ Listing

== Research and development ==
Head Mounted Displays (HMD): starting in 2000 the company began working with HMDs. Areas of research include augmented and virtual reality for educational, industrial, and training purposes, as well as entertainment and personal use.

Advanced Display manufacturing: areas of research include transparent displays for use in Heads Up Display (HUD) for aviation and automotive applications, and augmented reality.

Semiconductors

Advanced Lens manufacturing

== Awards and Presentations ==
2001:

- King of the Inventors Prize at the Scientific Technology Exhibition in Chungcheongbuk-do
- Participated at the Seoul International Image, Video and Optical Device Exhibition
- Won the Bronze Medal in Small and Medium Company Technology Innovation Competition

2006:

- Grand Prize at the Regional Innovation Exhibition by the South Korean Ministry of Commerce, Industry and Energy.
- Participated in CeBIT2006

2007:

- Participated in CeBIT2007

2009:

- Awarded the Grand Prize Innovative Entrepreneurship by the Korean Accounting Committee

2010:

- Awarded the Technology Prize by the Korean Optics Committee
- Awarded the Million Dollar Export Tower Trophy by the government of South Korea.

2012:

- Awarded the 2012 Grand Corporation Prize by the Korea Industrial Technology Association
- Participated and exhibited at CES.

2014:

- Korean Minister of Education Prize
- Selected by Korea Industrial Complex Corporation (KICOX) as a Global Leading Company.

2015:

- Exhibited at CES
- Great Intellectual Property CEO by Korean Patent Office Small and Medium Business Administration
- Awarded the Small and Medium Company Integrated Daejeon by the President of South Korea
- Awarded the Grand Prize for the Future Growth of Korea by Money Today

2016:

- Participated at CES 2016
