= Jinwoo SMC =

South Korean special-purpose vehicle manufacturer

- Native name: 진우에스엠씨
- Formerly: Hosung Machineries (1992–2007)
- Type: Public
- Industry: Aerial work platforms, special-purpose vehicles, fire apparatus
- Founded: December 1992
- Headquarters: Iksan, North Jeolla Province, South Korea
- Key people: Lee Jun-ho (CEO)
- Website: http://www.jinwoosmc.com/eng/

Jinwoo SMC (Korean: 진우에스엠씨) is a South Korean manufacturer of aerial work platforms, fire apparatus, and special-purpose vehicles, based in Iksan, North Jeolla Province.

== History ==
The company was founded in December 1992 under the name Hosung Machineries (호성기계). In October 2007 it incorporated as Jinwoo SMC Co., Ltd. (㈜진우에스엠씨).

== Products ==
Jinwoo SMC produces a range of special-purpose vehicles and aerial equipment. Products include aerial work platforms, insulated aerial work platforms, aerial ladder trucks (고가사다리차), plug-in hybrid sweeper trucks, unmanned demolition fire trucks (무인파괴방수소방차), and life-rescue fire vehicles (인명구조용소방차).

== See also ==
- List of South Korean companies
- Economy of South Korea
