= Dohwa =

South Korean engineering company

Dohwa Engineering Co., Ltd.
- Company type: Private
- Industry: Engineering; Construction
- Founded: 1957
- Headquarters: Dohwa Tower; 438 Samseong-ro, (942-1 Daechi-dong); Gangnam-gu, Seoul, South Korea
- Number of locations: 22 Regional Branch Offices
- Key people: Shon Young-Il Rho Jin-Myeong Park Seung-Woo; Kwak Jun-Sang
- Number of employees: 3,000 (2024)
- Website: http://www.dohwa.co.kr/

DOHWA Engineering Company Limited is a privately owned engineering, construction company in South Korea. DOHWA is one of the largest engineering design firms in South Korea. Founded in 1957, the firm has completed more than 6,900 projects domestic and worldwide. The company maintains offices in over 15 countries. DOHWA has raised 277 million USD revenue in 2010, which is the first among civil engineering design firms in South Korea. And Dohwa Engineering has been ranked 106th in The Top 150 Global Design Firms List published from Engineering News-Record 2011.

DOHWA Engineering Co., Ltd., is publicly listed and traded on the Korean Stock Exchange under the commodities code : 002150

== Offices ==
- Asia (South, Southeast): Vietnam, Indonesia, Bangladesh, Pakistan, Philippines, India
- Central Asia and Caucasus Region: Georgia, Kyrgyz Republic, Kazakhstan, Uzbekistan
- Middle East & North Africa (MENA) and Southern Africa: Oman, Algeria, Mozambique, Tanzania
- Europe : Poland
- Americas: Colombia, Peru, Bolivia, United States, Nicaragua, Honduras

== History ==
- 1957: DOHWA founded.
- 1961 DOHWA Incorporated.
- 2011 DOHWA Consulting Engineers Co., Ltd (도화종합기술공사) listed on the Korea Stock Exchange (KRX)
- 2011 Company name changed from DOHWA Consulting Engineers Co., Ltd., to DOHWA Engineering Co., Ltd.
