= Cuckoo Electronics =

South Korean manufacturing firm

Cuckoo Electronics Co., Ltd.
- Native name: 쿠쿠전자 주식회사
- Romanized name: Kuku Jeonja Jusik Hoesa
- Industry: Consumer electronics
- Founded: 1978; 48 years ago
- Headquarters: Yangsan, South Korea
- Products: Rice cooker
- Website: cuckooworld.com

Cuckoo Electronics Co., Ltd. (Korean: 쿠쿠전자 주식회사; RR: Kuku Jeonja Jusik Hoesa) is a home appliance maker headquartered in Yangsan, South Korea. Cuckoo was founded as Sungkwang Electronics in 1978. Its corporate identity was formally changed to Cuckoo in 2002 reflecting its major export brand name which had been in use since 1999.

== Products ==
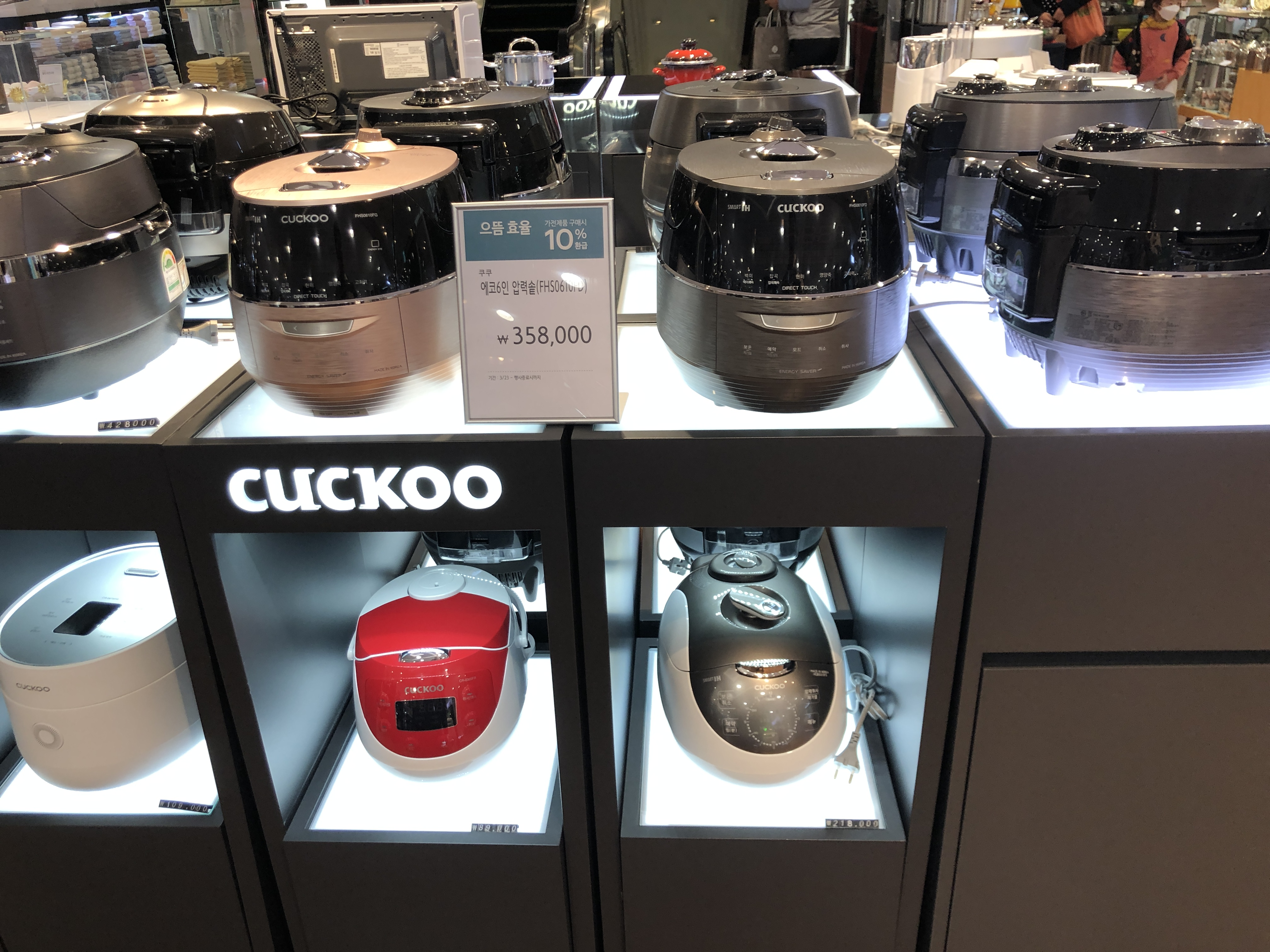
Cuckoo rice cookers

Cuckoo manufactures small home appliances, notably Korean-style pressure rice cookers. Korean-style cookers (0.8 kg to 0.9 kg cooking pressure) typically gelatinize rice starches more completely than Japanese-style cookers (0.4 kg to 0.6 kg cooking pressure) resulting in a more glutinous and marginally more nutritious cooked rice.

Besides rice cookers, Cuckoo also offers water and air purifiers, bidets, and other home appliance rental services.

== Operations ==
In South Korea Cuckoo is the top-selling brand of rice cooker. In 2002, Cuckoo started selling to distributors in New York and Los Angeles. In late 2016, Cuckoo established its first American branch, Cuckoo Electronics America, Inc. in Los Angeles, California.

Cuckoo was introduced in Malaysia in October 2014 by Hoe Kian Choon. As Cuckoo International, the brand established Cuckoo in other countries including Brunei, Singapore and Indonesia. Since becoming the Southeast Asian hub, Cuckoo has plans to expand the brand in other countries in the region.
