= SM Group (South Korean company) =

South Korean conglomerate

- Industry: Conglomerate
- Founded: 1988; 38 years ago, in Gwangju
- Founder: Woo Oh-hyun
- Headquarters: 3rd Floor, Sinchon Private Station30, Sinchonyeok-ro, Seodaemun-gu, Seoul, South Korea
- Area served: South Korea
- Website: https://www.smgroup.co.kr/

SM Group is a conglomerate based in Seoul, South Korea. SM's major business includes manufacturing, shipping and construction.

== Subsidiaries ==
Construction

- Samra
- Woobang
- Keangnam Enterprises
- Samwhan Enterprises
- Dongah Construction Industrial
- Taekil Construction
- STX Construction
- TK Chemical Construction Division
- Handuk Iron-mine & Construction
- SM Line Construction Division

Manufacturing

- TK Chemical
- Namsun Aluminum
- SM High Tech
- Bexel
- SM Industry
- SM Heavy Industries
- SM Steel
- Handuk Iron-mine & Construction
- Hwajin

Shipping

- Korea Line Corporation
- Korea Shipping
- SM Line Corporation
- Korea Line LNG
- Chang Myung Shipping
- KLC SM

Media and service

- Ulsan Broadcasting Corporation
- Korea Marine Finance Corporation
- SM Hiplus
- SM Credit Information
- Sinchon station

Hospitality

- Tops 10 Hotel & Resorts
  - Hotel Topsten
  - Tops 10 Villa de Aewol Jeju
  - Donggang Cistar
  - Toops 10 Golf Club (Donggang C.C, Apple Valley C.C)

== Incidents ==
=== Workplace Harassment and Verbal Abuse by Chairman(Woo Oh-hyun / 우오현) ===
In a series of investigative reports by South Korean broadcaster JTBC, audio recordings were released revealing SM Group Chairman Woo Oh-hyun frequently using severe profanity and verbally abusing company executives and employees.

While Woo is credited with building SM Group into a major conglomerate with 17 trillion won in assets through aggressive mergers and acquisitions, his management style has been heavily criticized for fostering a toxic work environment. According to the released recordings, Woo routinely insulted staff members and frequently demanded their immediate resignations when he was displeased with their work performance.

Former executives testified that Woo demanded absolute obedience from his staff. According to one former executive, Woo allegedly instructed a task force directly under his command to treat him as "God" and follow him as such. The hostile work environment, verbal abuse, and repeated threats of termination reportedly led to the resignations of numerous CEOs and senior executives across SM Group's affiliate companies.
