= Bexel =

South Korean chemical company

SM Bexel Co, Ltd.
- Company type: Public
- Industry: Chemical
- Founded: 1978; 48 years ago
- Headquarters: Yeongdeungpo-gu Seoul/Gumi Gyeongsangbuk-do, South Korea
- Products: Batteries
- Revenue: ▲$470 million USD (2004)
- Owner: SM Group
- Website: www.bexel.co.kr/en/html/index/index.php

- Bexel
- Hangul: 벡셀
- Revised Romanization: Beksel
- McCune–Reischauer: Peksel

SM Bexel Co, Ltd. (Korean: SM벡셀, formerly known as Bexel) is a South Korean chemical company specializing in battery manufacture. It is headquartered in Yangpyeong-dong Yeongdeungpo-gu, Seoul and Gongdan-dong, Gumi, Gyeongsangbuk-do, South Korea. Founded in 1978, it also manufactures other electronic products. Manufacturing is based in Gumi, Gyeongsangbuk-do.

== Products ==
- Consumer battery
- OEM battery (Bexel & Supergard Brand)
- Package Battery - Rechargeable battery, Military Charger, Battery pack
- Worldwide Export Battery

== See also ==
- Economy of South Korea
