= CSIA =

CSIA may refer to:

== Airports ==
- Chhatrapati Shivaji Maharaj International Airport, Mumbai, India

== Schools ==
- Camborne Science and International Academy, Cornwall, England
- Cheongshim International Academy, Gyeonggi Province, South Korea

== Other ==
- Canadian Ski Instructors' Alliance
- Certified Securities Investment Advisor in South Korea
- China Software Industry Association
- Customer Service Institute of Australia

== See also ==
- Calgary Society of Independent Filmmakers (CSIF)
- CISA (disambiguation)
- CSAI (disambiguation)
