= SK Hynix =

South Korean technology company

SK Hynix Inc.
- Logo since 2012
- Native name: 에스케이하이닉스 주식회사
- Formerly: Hyundai Electronics (1983–2001); Hynix (2001–2012)
- Type: Public
- Traded as: KRX: 000660; Nasdaq: SKHY
- ISIN: KR7000660001
- Industry: Semiconductor
- Founded: 15 October 1949; 77 years ago (legal); 26 February 1983; 43 years ago (actual)
- Founder: Chung Ju-yung
- Headquarters: Icheon, South Korea
- Key people: Kwak Noh-Jung (President & CEO)
- Products: DRAM (incl. HBM); NAND flash; Solid-state drives (SSDs); Multi-chip packages (MCP); CMOS image sensors
- Revenue: ▲ ₩97.15 trillion (US$72.49 billion) (2025)
- Operating income: ▲ ₩47.21 trillion (US$35.22 billion) (2025)
- Net income: ▲ ₩42.95 trillion (US$32.05 billion) (2025)
- Total assets: ▲ ₩194.97 trillion (US$145.47 billion) (2025)
- Total equity: ▲ ₩147.31 trillion (US$109.91 billion) (2025)
- Number of employees: 46,863 (2025)
- Parent: Hyundai (1983–2001); SK (2012–present)
- Website: skhynix.com

SK Hynix Inc. (Korean: 에스케이하이닉스 주식회사), stylized SK hynix, is a South Korean semiconductor company that manufactures dynamic random-access memory (DRAM) chips and flash memory chips. SK Hynix is one of the world's largest semiconductor vendors, and, along with Samsung Electronics and Micron, one of the "Big Three" memory manufacturers.

Founded in 1983 as Hyundai Electronics, SK Hynix was integrated into the SK Group in 2012 following a series of mergers, acquisitions, and restructuring efforts. After being incorporated into the SK Group, SK Hynix became a major affiliate alongside SK Innovation and SK Telecom.

The company's major customers include Nvidia, Microsoft, Apple, Asus, Dell, MSI, HP Inc., and Hewlett Packard Enterprise (formerly Hewlett-Packard). Other products that use Hynix memory include DVD players, cellular phones, set-top boxes, personal digital assistants, networking equipment, and hard disk drives.

== History ==
=== Beginning ===
==== Hyundai Electronics ====
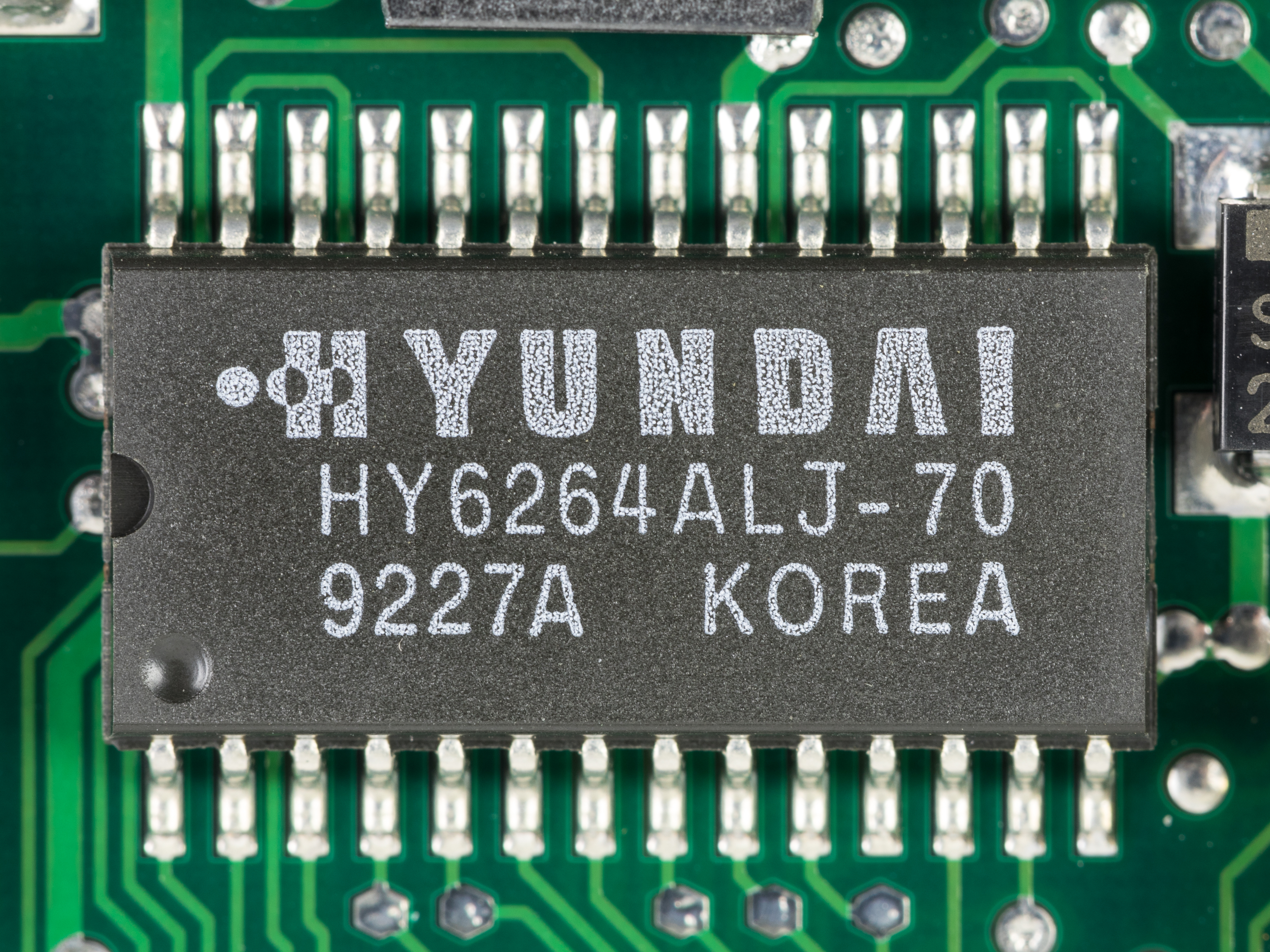
A Hyundai SRAM in a Seagate Hard Drive (ST351A-X)

Hyundai Electronics was founded in 1983 by Chung Ju-yung, the founder of Hyundai Group. In the early 1980s, Chung recognized the growing importance of electronics in the automobile industry, one of Hyundai's primary business areas. He saw the potential for Hyundai to expand beyond its core operations in automobiles, shipbuilding, and heavy industries and wanted to establish a presence in the promising electronics industry. The company's primary focus was on semiconductor production and industrial electronics.

Hyundai had to pay a very high entry price to set up an efficient production system and to stabilize the yield rate compared to its rival Samsung, who at least had prior experience in semiconductor manufacturing. Hyundai's decision to produce SRAMs was later proven to be a mistake, as the technological sophistication of SRAMs made it difficult for Hyundai to achieve a satisfactory yield rate. In 1985, Hyundai altered its strategy for DRAM manufacturing by subcontracting from foreign firms and importing their chip designs, as it had lost time developing its own chips. Hyundai's DRAM chip, produced by importing Vitelic Corporation's design and technology, again failed in mass production due to a low yield rate.

Hyundai's approach to manufacturing memory chips as a foundry for foreign firms under OEM agreements was successful. The OEM agreements between General Instruments and Texas Instruments were helpful to Hyundai, which was facing technological and financial difficulties. By 1992, Hyundai had become the world's ninth DRAM manufacturer, and by 1995, it ranked among the world's top 20 semiconductor manufacturing companies. In 1996, Hyundai acquired Maxtor, a U.S.-based disk-drive manufacturer.

==== LG Semicon ====
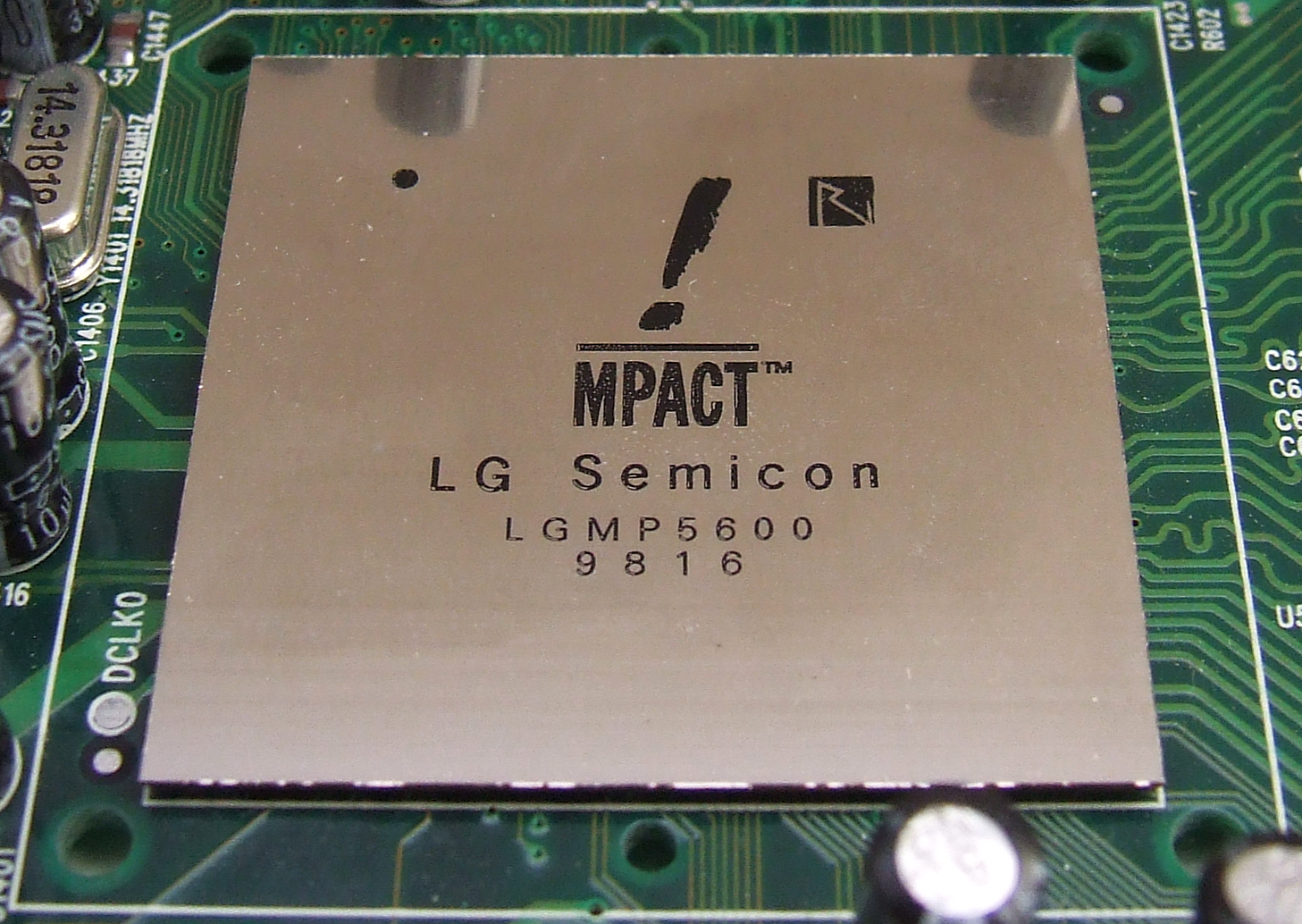
LG Semiconductor 3DMAX-A (8 MB) video card

GoldStar, which later became LG Electronics, entered the semiconductor business by acquiring a small company from Taihan Electric Wire in 1979. The company was subsequently renamed GoldStar Semiconductor. LG Semicon was established as Goldstar Electron in 1983 by merging the semiconductor operations of Goldstar Electronics and Goldstar Semiconductors. In 1990, Goldstar Electron commenced operations at Cheongju Plant I, followed by the completion of Cheongju Plant II in 1994. The company underwent a name change to LG Semicon in 1995. LG Semicon operated from three sites, including Seoul, Cheongju, and Gumi.

==== Merger ====
During the 1997 Asian financial crisis, the South Korean government initiated the restructuring of the nation's five major conglomerates, including their semiconductor businesses. Among five chaebols, Samsung, LG, and Hyundai were engaged in the semiconductor business. Samsung was exempt from the restructuring due to its competitive position in the global market. However, LG and Hyundai were pressured by the government to merge, as both companies faced significant losses during the semiconductor recession of early 1996. In 1998, Hyundai Electronics acquired LG Semicon for US$2.1 billion, positioning itself in direct competition with Micron Technology. Subsequently, LG Semicon was rebranded as Hyundai Semiconductor and later merged with Hyundai Electronics.

=== Hynix ===
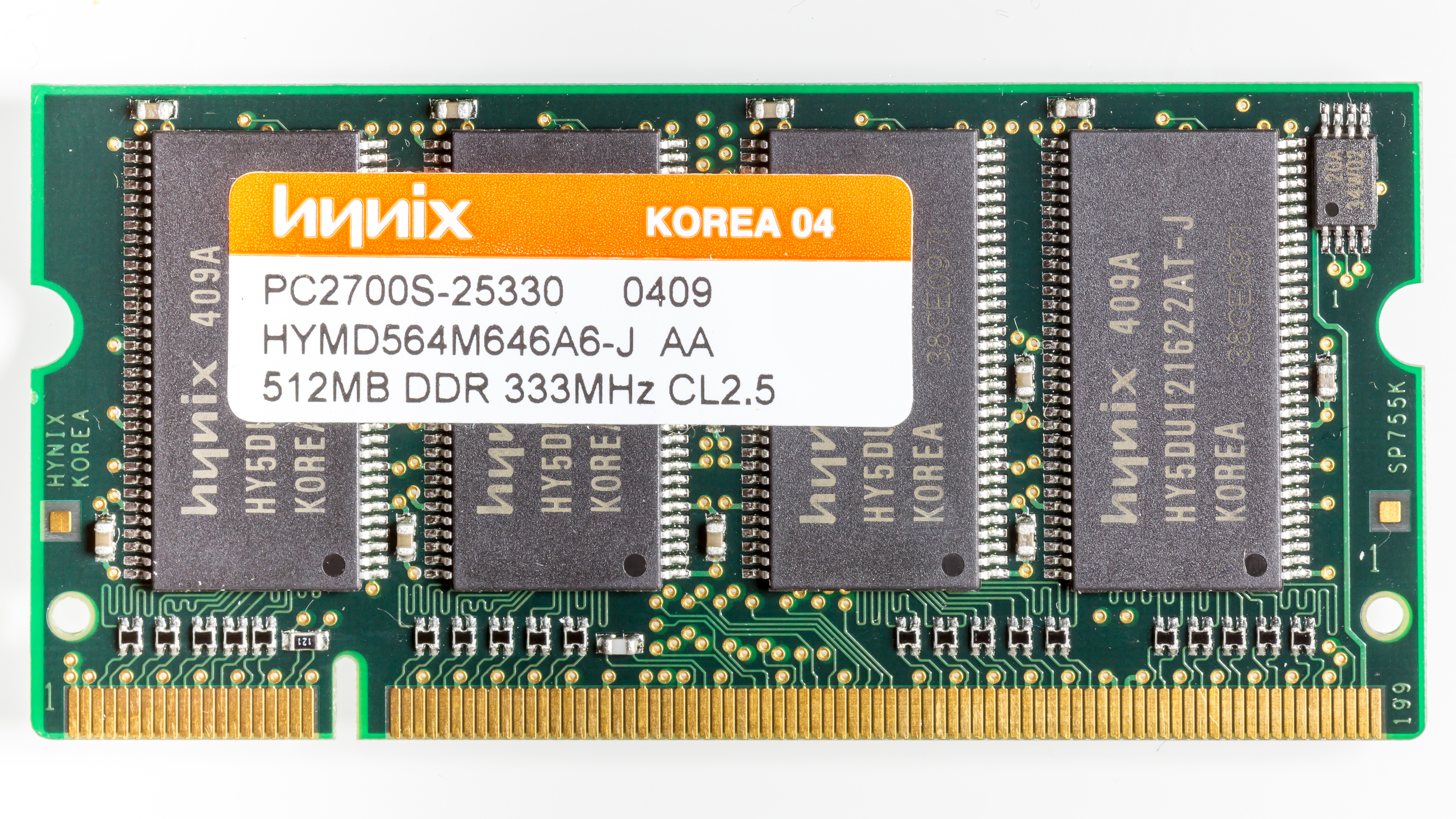
A 512 MB DDR 333 MHz SO-DIMM Hynix memory module

Logo between 2001 and 2012

Although the South Korean government aimed to merge the two companies to alleviate the supply glut in the global market, competition in the semiconductor industry had intensified. Hyundai faced near collapse during the chip industry's downturn in 2001, when global memory chip prices dropped by 80 percent, resulting in a 5 trillion won annual loss for the company. Creditor banks, many of them under government control at the time, intervened to provide assistance.

In 2001, Hyundai Electronics rebranded as Hynix Semiconductor, a portmanteau of "high" and "electronics". Alongside this change, Hynix began selling or spinning off business units to recover from a cash squeeze. Hynix separated several business units, including Hyundai Curitel, a mobile phone manufacturer; Hyundai SysComm, a CDMA mobile communication chip maker; Hyundai Autonet, a car navigation system producer; ImageQuest, a flat panel display company; and its TFT-LCD unit, among others. The divestiture was part of a bailout plan requested by the major creditor, Korea Development Bank, to provide fresh funds to the insolvent semiconductor maker.

In 2003, Hyundai Group affiliates, including Hyundai Merchant Marine, Hyundai Heavy Industries, Hyundai Elevator, and Chung Mong-hun, the chairman of Hyundai Asan, consented to forfeit their voting rights and sell their stakes in Hynix. Hynix was then formally spun-off from the Hyundai Group in August 2003.

=== SK Hynix ===
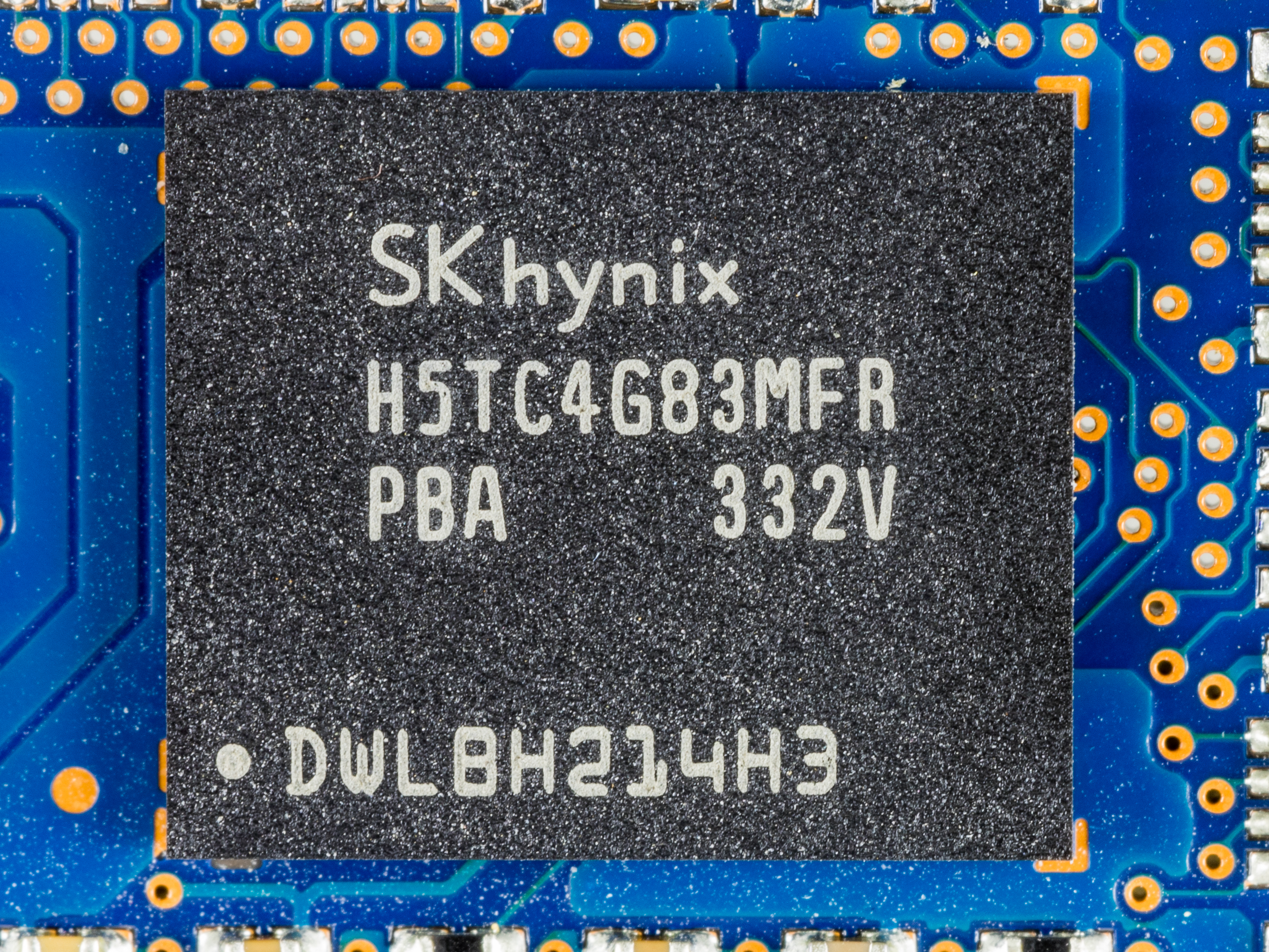
SK Hynix SDRAM in an Apple MacBook Pro

The Hynix creditors, including Korea Exchange Bank, Woori Bank, Shinhan Bank and Korea Finance Corporation, attempted to sell their stakes in Hynix several times but failed. Korean companies such as Hyosung, Dongbu CNI, and former stakeholders, including Hyundai Heavy Industries and LG, were considered potential bidders but were either denied or withdrew from the bidding. In July 2011, SK Telecom, the nation's largest telecommunication company, and STX Group officially entered the bid. STX dropped its deal in September 2011, leaving SK Telecom as the sole bidder. In the end, SK acquired Hynix for US$3 billion in February 2012. As Hynix was incorporated into SK Group, its name was changed to SK Hynix.

In 2021, Hynix acquired Intel's NAND business for $9 billion, resulting in the establishment of Solidigm.

On September 26, 2024, SK Hynix said "it has begun mass production of 12-layer high bandwidth memory (HBM) chips, the first in the world". As of Q2 2025, SK Hynix controlled 38% of the global DRAM market.

In March 2026, it was reported that SK Hynix had filed with the U.S. Securities and Exchange Commission for a potential listing on the New York Stock Exchange.

The global AI boom led to a massive surge in corporate profits and stock prices in 2025/26. In the first quarter of 2026, the company achieved an operating profit of $25 billion, which was nearly equal to the annual revenue of 2022. Ten percent of the expected annual profit of $169 billion is to be distributed directly to employees as bonuses, amounting to just under half a million dollars per person.

As of June 2026, its market capitalization was estimated at KRW 1.251 trillion, ranking it 13th globally by market capitalization.

On June 22, 2026, SK Hynix surpassed Samsung Electronics in market capitalization based on common shares, becoming the largest company on the KOSPI by market value. It marked the first time Samsung Electronics had relinquished its position as the KOSPI's most valuable listed company since November 2000, ending a reign of 25 years and 7 months.

On July 10, 2026, SK Hynix began trading its American depositary receipts on the Nasdaq under the ticker SKHY. The offering raised US$26.5 billion.

On July 21, 2026, media reports suggested that SK Hynix had agreed to acquire Intel's semiconductor fab site and facilities in Ohio, United States, and has begun the acquisition process, a move aimed at responding to U.S. government pressure for investment and market demands for increased supply.

== Corporate governance ==
As of December 2023:

Shareholder	Stake (%)	Flag
SK Square	20.07%	South Korea
National Pension Service	7.90%	South Korea

== Financials ==
The key trends for SK Hynixs are (as of the financial year ending 31 December):

	Revenue (USD billion)	EBIT (USD billion)	Total Assets (USD billion)	Total Equity (USD billion)	Market cap (USD billion)
2015	16.41	4.72	25.24	18.19	18.46
2016	14.92	2.86	26.72	19.92	26.18
2017	27.03	12.17	42.60	31.72	50.49
2018	36.72	19.45	57.02	41.97	37.07
2019	23.24	2.32	56.42	41.45	55.66
2020	27.41	5.63	65.51	47.77	74.60
2021	37.04	11.70	80.97	52.26	75.70
2022	34.44	3.44	82.37	50.19	40.65
2023	24.89	-7.75	77.56	41.36	77.40
2024	47.96	18.16	81.67	50.37	81.73
2025	68.72	36.25	122.47	83.91	286.61

In June 2026, SK Hynix said it planned to raise up to US$29.4 billion through a Nasdaq listing of American depositary receipts, with proceeds intended for new semiconductor fabrication facilities in South Korea and chipmaking equipment to boost supply to fill the 2025–present global memory supply shortage.

== Operations ==
SK Hynix has production facilities in Icheon and Cheongju, South Korea, and in Wuxi, Chongqing and Dalian, China.

== Products ==
Hynix produces a variety of semiconductor memories, including:

- Computing memory
- Consumer and network memory
- Graphics memory
- Mobile memory
- NAND flash memory
- CMOS image sensors
- Solid-state drives (SSDs)
- High Bandwidth Memory: SK Hynix supplies high-bandwidth memory (HBM) chips that are used in AI. The company also supplies the HBM3E, a fifth-generation HBM, to Nvidia.

== Controversy ==
Hynix, alongside Toshiba and Samsung, produced MLC NAND chips for the Wii U. However, it was later discovered that a large amount of these chips were faulty and extremely prone to failure if the console was left unpowered for too long. This resulted in a lot of Wii Us being unusable and requiring hardmods to repair.

== See also ==
- List of semiconductor fabrication plants
- Semiconductor industry in South Korea
