= Hanon Systems =

South Korean manufacturing company

Hanon Systems Co., Ltd.
- Native name: 한온시스템 주식회사
- Formerly: Halla Climate Control (1986–2013); Halla Visteon Climate Control (2013–2015)
- Company type: Public
- Traded as: KRX: 018880
- Industry: Automotive
- Founded: March 11, 1986; 40 years ago
- Headquarters: Daejeon, South Korea
- Owner: Hankook
- Website: hanonsystems.com

Hanon Systems Co., Ltd. (Korean: 한온시스템 주식회사) is an automotive parts manufacturing firm headquartered in Daejeon, South Korea. It is one of the world's largest suppliers of auto thermal management systems.

On January 6, 2025, Hankook announced that it had completed the acquisition of a majority stake in Hanon Systems.

== History ==
Hanon Systems was initially established as Halla Climate Control, a joint venture between Ford and Mando Machinery, in 1986. During the Asian financial crisis in 1999, Halla Group, a parent company of Mando, went bankrupt and sold its entire stake in the joint venture to Visteon under Ford. After Visteon's takeover, Ford integrated Visteon's thermal system businesses into Halla Climate Control and changed its name to Halla Visteon Climate Control (HVCC) in 2013.

In 2015, Visteon sold its 70% stake in HVCC to a consortium led by Hahn & Company, a South Korean private equity investment firm, and Hankook. HVCC was renamed Hanon Systems after the acquisition. In 2019, Hanon Systems acquired Magna International's fluid pressure and control unit for US$1.23 billion.

== See also ==
- Automotive industry in South Korea
