= Kofia =

Kofia or KOFIA may refer to:

- Kofia, the Swedish-Palestinian band known for their 1978 protest song "Leve Palestina"
- Kofia (hat), a brimless hat similar to a fez
- Korea Financial Investment Association, a self-regulatory body in South Korea
