= Hanil Networks =

South Korean IT company

- Company type: Public
- Traded as: KRX: 046110
- Industry: Computer
- Founded: 1998; 28 years ago
- Headquarters: Seoul, South Korea
- Area served: Worldwide
- Key people: Jihoon Park (CEO)
- Products: Contact center
- Revenue: Won 88.1 billion (2014)
- Operating income: Won 120,632 million (2015)
- Net income: Won 64,884 million (2011)
- Website: www.hanilnetworks.com

Hanil Networks Co., Ltd is an IT company headquartered in Seoul, South Korea, and a member of Hanil Cement Group. Established in 1998, it engages in network service, contact center solution, system & security and ERP.

== Business division ==
=== Services ===
==== Digital Space Convergence (DSC) ====
Branded as "TT Zone", DSC is a Contact Center outsourcing brand.

==== System Management ====
Public data center.

=== IT equipment ===
==== System & security ====
They sell PCs, notebooks and X86 servers.
