= HLK =

HLK may refer to:

- Windows HLK, a test automation framework provided by Microsoft
- HLK Holdings, formed by the two companies Hanil Cement and LK Investment Partners
- HLK, the Amtrak station code for Holyoke station, Massachusetts, United States
