= KOSPI =

Korean stock market index

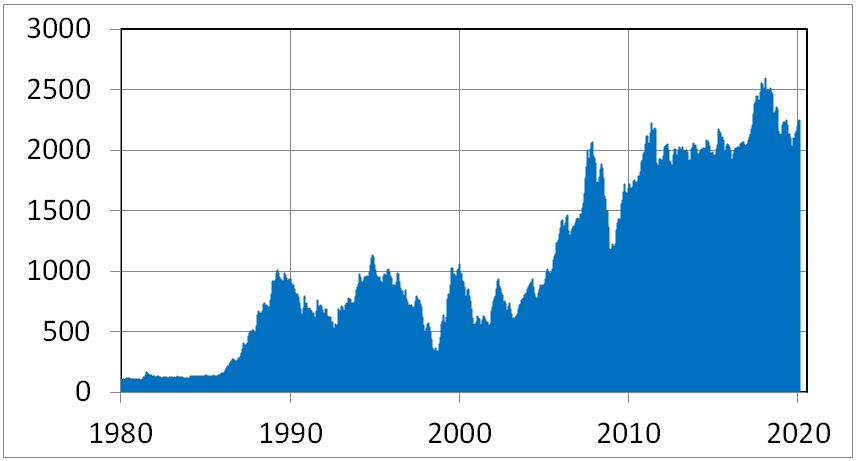
- KOSPI performance between 1980 and 2020
- Foundation: 1980; 46 years ago
- Exchanges: Korea Exchange
- Trading symbol: ^KS11
- Constituents: 954
- Market cap: ₩4,135 trillion ($2.815 trillion) (January 2026)

- KOSPI
- Hangul: 코스피 지수
- Hanja: 코스피指數
- RR: Koseupi jisu
- MR: K'osŭp'i chisu

The Korea Composite Stock Price Index (KOSPI; Korean: 한국종합주가지수) is the index of all common stocks traded on the Stock Market Division—previously, Korea Stock Exchange—of the Korea Exchange. It is the representative stock market index of South Korea, analogous to the S&P 500 in the United States.

KOSPI was introduced in 1983 with the base value of 100 as of 4 January 1980. It is calculated based on market capitalization. As of 2007, KOSPI's daily volume is hundreds of millions of shares, valued at trillions of won.

== History ==
KOSPI was introduced in 1983, replacing the Dow-style KCSPI (Korea Composite Stock Price Index).

For years, KOSPI moved below 1,000, peaking above 1,000 in April 1989, November 1994, and January 2000. On 17 June 1998, KOSPI recorded its largest one-day percentage gain of 8.50% (23.81 points), recovering from the bottom of the Asian financial crisis. On 12 September 2001, KOSPI had its largest one-day percentage drop of 12.02% (64.97 points) just after 9/11. On 28 February 2005, KOSPI closed at 1,011.36, plunging to 902.88 in April.

In November 2005, the index's Korean name was officially changed to Koseupi jisu (코스피지수).

On 24 July 2007, KOSPI broke 2,000 level for the first time. On 25 July it closed at 2,004.22. On 20 August 2007, the index recovered 93.20 (5.69%), its largest one-day point gain, after the U.S. Federal Reserve lowered the discount rate. On 16 October 2008, the index dropped 126.50 (9.44%), after the Dow Jones Industrial Average dropped 7.87%.

On 23 November 2020, the index broke the record set in 2018 for the first time at 2,602.59 points, after the coronavirus pandemic of 2020 plunged the KOSPI to a low in March.

During the AI boom the Kospi has experienced extreme volatility due to the massive rise of share price of memory companies Samsung Electronics and SK Hynix due to the 2025–present global memory supply shortage, which has caused concentration risk as they made up around 50% of the index's weighting by July 2026. The volatility has caused 11 level circuit breakers to occur in the South Korean stock market in 2026. Between April 2025 to June 2026 the index value more than tripled from 2,500 to more than 9,000 before collapsing 44% to 5,000 by November 2026.

== Record values ==
All-time highs
Category	Index value	Date
Closing	9,114.55	22 June 2026
Intraday	9,385.59	19 June 2026

Starting from 24 February 2020, the index dropped continuously during the COVID-19 pandemic. As of 15 March, the KOSPI closed at 1,771.44, prompting the Financial Supervisory Commission to impose a six-month ban on short-selling, the first such drastic action in nearly nine years.

== Milestones ==
The following is a timeline showing the rise of the KOSPI over the course of Korean stock market history.

Milestones
Index milestone	Date	Closing index value
100	4 January 1980	100.00
200	1 April 1986	200.15
300	21 January 1987	301.93
400	31 March 1987	405.13
500	19 August 1987	500.73
600	26 January 1988	602.32
700	24 May 1988	705.51
800	24 November 1988	805.86
900	12 December 1988	911.35
1,000	31 March 1989	1,003.31
1,500	9 April 2007	1,501.06
2,000	25 July 2007	2,004.22
2,500	30 October 2017	2,501.93
3,000	7 January 2021	3,031.68
3,500	2 October 2025	3,549.21
4,000	27 October 2025	4,042.83
4,500	6 January 2026	4,525.48
5,000	27 January 2026	5,084.85
5,500	12 February 2026	5,522.27
6,000	25 February 2026	6,083.86
6,500	27 April 2026	6,615.03
7,000	6 May 2026	7,384.56
7,500	11 May 2026	7,822.24
8,000	26 May 2026	8,047.51
8,500	1 June 2026	8,788.38
9,000	18 June 2026	9,063.84

== Annual Returns ==
The following table shows the annual development of the KOSPI since 1981.

Year	Closing level	Change in index over the calendar year	
Year	Closing level	Points	%
1981	131.30		
1982	128.99	−2.31	−1.76
1983	121.21	−7.78	−6.03
1984	142.46	21.25	17.53
1985	163.37	20.91	14.68
1986	272.61	109.24	66.87
1987	525.11	252.50	92.62
1988	907.20	382.09	72.76
1989	909.72	2.52	0.28
1990	696.11	−213.61	−23.48
1991	610.92	−85.19	−12.24
1992	678.44	67.52	11.05
1993	866.18	187.74	27.67
1994	1,027.37	161.19	18.61
1995	882.94	−144.43	−14.06
1996	651.22	−231.72	−26.24
1997	376.31	−274.91	−42.21
1998	562.46	187.31	49.93
1999	1,028.07	465.61	82.78
2000	504.62	−523.45	−50.92
2001	693.70	189.08	37.47
2002	627.55	−66.15	−9.54
2003	810.71	183.16	29.19
2004	895.92	85.21	10.51
2005	1,379.37	483.45	53.96
2006	1,434.46	55.09	3.99
2007	1,897.13	462.67	32.25
2008	1,124.47	−772.66	−40.73
2009	1,682.77	558.30	49.65
2010	2,051.00	368.23	21.88
2011	1,825.74	−225.26	−10.98
2012	1,997.05	171.31	9.38
2013	2,011.34	14.29	0.74
2014	1,915.59	−95.75	−4.76
2015	1,961.31	45.72	2.39
2016	2,026.46	65.15	3.32
2017	2,467.49	441.03	21.76
2018	2,041.04	−426.45	−17.28
2019	2,197.67	156.63	7.67
2020	2,873.47	675.80	30.75
2021	2,977.65	104.18	3.63
2022	2,236.40	−741.25	−24.89
2023	2,655.28	418.88	18.73
2024	2,399.49	−255.79	−9.63
2025	4,214.17	1,814.68	75.63

== Components ==
As of February 2024, KOSPI has over 880 components. As of March 2025, the top 10 stocks by market capitalization are:

Logo	Company	Symbol
	Samsung Electronics	KRX: 005930
	SK Hynix	KRX: 000660
	Samsung Biologics	KRX: 207940
	LG Energy Solution	KRX: 373220
	Hyundai Motor Company	KRX: 005380
	Celltrion	KRX: 068270
	Kia	KRX: 000270
	Naver Corporation	KRX: 035420
	KB Financial Group	KRX: 105560
	Hanwha Aerospace	KRX: 012450

== Other indices ==
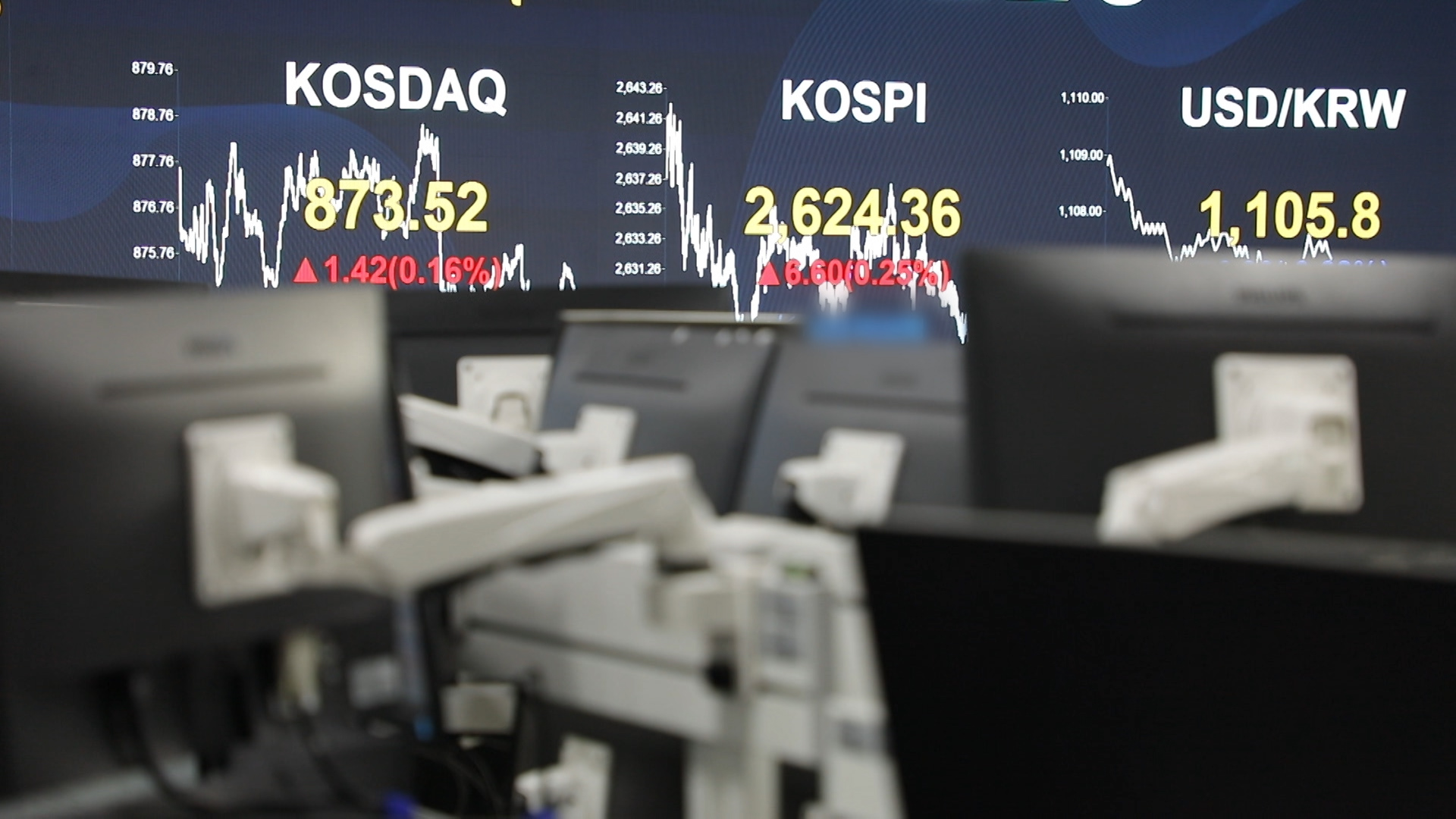
Kospi, Kosdaq, and KRW (in January 2022)

- KOSPI 200, KOSPI 100, and KOSPI 50
- LargeCap, MidCap, and SmallCap indices based on market capitalization
- KOGI corporate governance index
- KODI dividend index
- Industry indices like chemicals, electrical & electronic equipments, transport equipment, or banks.
- KRX 100 and other KRX indices which take into account both stock markets of Korea Exchange (KRX) — Stock Market Division and KOSDAQ Division

=== KOSPI 200 ===
The KOSPI 200 index consists of 200 big companies of the Stock Market Division. The base value of 100 was set on 3 January 1990. It has over 70% market value of the KOSPI, and so moves along with the KOSPI index. KOSPI 200 is important because it is listed on futures and option markets and is one of the most actively traded indices in the world. The KOSPI is calculated as current market capitalization (at the time of comparison) divided by base market capitalization (as of 4 January 1980).

That is: Current index = Current total market cap of constituents × 100 / Base Market Capitalization

Its all-time low is 31.96, reached on 16 June 1998, during the financial crisis. It closed above 200 for the first time on 24 April 2007.

Kospi 200 futures (ticker symbol KOS) are traded on the Korean Futures Exchange. Contracts are quoted in index points with each contract size valued at 250,000 index points. CQG contract specifications for the kospi 200 can be found in the table below.

KOSPI 200: Contract Specifications
Contract Size	250,000 Points
Exchange	KRX
Sector	Index
Tick Size	0.05
Tick Value	12500 KRW
Big Point Value (BPV)	KRW
Decimal Places	2

=== KRX 100 ===
KRX 100 is the index of 100 companies listed on Korea Exchange, including KOSDAQ's big companies. It's meant to replace KOSPI 200 as the key futures index, but has not been very successful to date.

=== KRX derivatives products ===
- Stock Index Products: KOSPI 200 Futures, KOSPI 200 Options, STAR Futures
- Individual Equity Products: Individual Equity Futures, Individual Equity Options
- Interest Rate Products: 3-Year Korea Treasury Bond Futures (KTB3), 5-Year Korea Treasury Bond Futures (KTB5), 10-Year Korea Treasury Bond Futures (KTB10), MSB Futures
- Currency Products: USD Futures, USD Options, Japanese Yen Futures, Euro Futures
- Commodity Products: Gold Futures, Lean Hog Futures

== Investment procedures for foreigners ==
To trade futures and options contracts listed on KRX, a foreign investor may designate custodian banks as standing proxies (through custodian bank agreements and standing proxy agreements to facilitate trading).

A custodian bank as a standing proxy opens accounts at foreign exchange banks and futures companies, deposits, and withdrawals investors' money and monitors investors' properties for them. A foreign investor should designate foreign exchange banks through a foreign currency exchange agreement to execute his foreign exchange transactions and transfers. Most foreign exchange banks also do custodian bank and standing proxy operations. A foreign investor should designate securities and futures companies to trade futures and options traded on KRX.

== See also ==
- CNX Nifty
- Hang Seng Index
- KOSDAQ
- KOSPI 200
- Nikkei 225
- SENSEX
- SSE Composite
- TAIEX
