= KEB =

KEB can refer to:

- Korea Exchange Bank of South Korea, established in 1967 or
- Karl E. Brinkmann GmbH of Germany, established in 1972.
- Karnataka Electricity Board
- Empress Elisabeth Railway of Austria – German: Kaiserin-Elisabeth-Bahn
