= Korea LIME =

South Korean investment consulting company

LIME Asset Management Co. is a South Korean investment consulting company that was established on March 30, 2012 and best known for the Korea LIME investment scandal. The company was founded by Jongjoon Won, who was previously a fund manager at Truston Asset Management and Brain Asset Management. In 2015 the company shifted to being operated as a hedge fund management firm. The company quickly developed by a private fund that focused on investment in mezzanine financial products. It was revealed that Vice-President Jongpil Lee of the company embezzled funds from companies where customer assets had been invested. The case was investigated at the Criminal Affairs Department 6 of the Seoul Southern District Prosecutors' Office.

== Issues ==
In July 2019, LIME began selling convertible bonds of companies listed on the KOSDAQ, and around this time, suspicion arose that the company was maintaining an illegal rate of return. The share prices of stocks that were in the fund run by LIME crashed, and there were concerns of an imminent fund run crises. This led to redemptions being frozen. The issue was caused by purchasing a large volume of insolvent assets, including mezzanine of KOSDAQ zombie companies, for increasing the rate of return in the short-term. In Korea there are regulations which limit how many bonds that can be owned by one entity. However, to bypass this regulation, "parking transactions" were done, by making purchases in the name of another company. It is also alleged that when the fund experienced a loss, returns were fabricated by replacing the loss with monies from another fund.

== Problem ==
According to the Financial Supervisory Service, Lime Asset Management was found to have sold open funds that can be redeemed at any time while investing in assets with low exchangeability. It also invested more than the principal amount invested in non-current assets, such as private equity bonds, in total revenue swaps (TRS) transactions. Lime Asset Management is known to have signed TRS contracts worth 670 billion won with three securities firms—Shinhan Financial Investment (500 billion won), KB Securities (100 billion won) and Korea Investment & Securities (70 billion won) -- for the three parent funds (Pluto FI D-1, Tetis 2 and Pluto TF 1).

Total revenue swap (TRS) transactions are transactions in which a securities firm purchases assets for a certain fee from an asset manager, and an asset management company has a return from assets, with the return taken by an asset manager but the assets held by a securities firm. From an asset manager's point of view, the company can increase its return as it can enjoy leverage effects. On the other hand, if losses occur on funds run by an operator, securities firms demand an increase in the TRS's collateral ratio, and if they do not, securities firms charge delayed interest, further lowering the fund's yield.

Lime Asset Management operated privately and sold only private equity funds that could be invested in unlisted stocks or mezzanine. The private equity fund was sold using the method invested by the fund to attract many investors.

== Timeline of the case ==
- February 19, 2020: the Prosecutor's Office conducted a search and seizure in connection with Shinhan Asset Management and LIME Asset Management.
- March 31, 2020: associates of Chairman Kim of Star Mobility was arrested. The Financial Supervisory Service conducted an on-site survey of Woori Bank and Hana Bank, the distributors of lime asset management, in the fourth week of April 2020, and will conduct an on-site survey of two to three securities firms in the fifth week. When the on-site investigation of securities firms is completed, legal reviews on fraud and incomplete sales will be launched in May based on the results compiled.
- April 18, 2020:the Seoul Southern District Court issued an arrest warrant for Kim, who served as an administrator of Cheong Wa Dae on charges of bribery and leaking confidential information on public affairs under the Specific Crimes-weighted Punishment Act. The former administrator, identified only by his surname Kim, is suspected of taking 49 million won in bribes and leaking and delivering a preliminary investigation document on rhymes written by the FSS in April 2019.
- April 23, 2020: The prosecution raided the Financial Services Commission of the Government Complex in Seoul, and the data obtained reportedly included data related to a former Cheong Wa Dae administrator involved in the case. Jongpil Lee, former Vice President of LIME, and Bonghyeon Kim, former Chairman of Star Mobility, were arrested outside of a residence in the Seongbuk-gu area of Seoul. Former chairman Kim was hiding out together with former LIME Vice-President Jongpil Lee, and was keeping 530 million won in cash (about US$428,000), and was storing 5.5 billion won (about US$4.4 million) in a rental locker located in Seoul. Former chairman Kim testified to the police, "[I] was transporting three luggage carriers containing 5.5 billion won, and since they were so heavy, I hurt my back." Former chairman Kim was hiding out together with former LIME vice-president Jongpil Lee, and was keeping 530 million won in cash (about US$428,000), and was storing 5.5 billion won (about US$4.4 million) in a rental locker located in Seoul. Former chairman Kim testified to the police, "[I] was transporting three luggage carriers containing 5.5 billion won, and since they were so heavy, I hurt my back."
- April 25, 2020:The Seoul Southern District Court issued an arrest warrant for former Vice President Lee Jong-pil, saying he is feared to destroy evidence or flee.
- April 26, 2020:The Suwon District Court issued an arrest warrant for former chairman Kim Bong-hyun on charges of embezzling 24.1 billion won from a bus company in Gyeonggi Province.
- End of April 2020: the Financial Supervisory Service carried out a due diligence investigation of Woori Bank and Hana Bank, which sold LIME Asset Management. An additional due diligence investigation of two or three securities companies was also scheduled.

== Similar incident ==
There are mass loss cases of DLS and DLF in 2019. However, the DLS and DLF cases were judged to be simple incomplete sales (violation of the Capital Markets and Financial Investment Business Act).
