= Chung Yong-ji =

South Korean businessman (born 1970)

Chung Yong‑ji
- 정용지
- Born: February 25, 1970 (age 55); South Korea
- Education: Sungkyunkwan University (BS); University of Texas at San Antonio (MS); Cornell University (PhD)
- Occupation: Businessman
- Employer: Caregen

Chung Yong‑ji (Korean: 정용지; born February 25, 1970) is a South Korean businessman. The founder and CEO of the biotechnology company Caregen, Forbes estimated his net worth at US$1.1 billion in February 2023.

== Education ==
Chung attained his Bachelor of Science in Genetic Engineering from Sungkyunkwan University. He then pursued a master’s degree in biology at the University of Texas at San Antonio, (Note: other sources say Texas State University) and in 1996 completed a PhD in molecular biology (animal science) at Cornell University. Following that, he conducted postdoctoral research in Breast Oncology at the Northwestern University Feinberg School of Medicine from 2000 to 2001.

== Career ==
Chung founded Caregen in August 2001, focusing on peptide technology research and development.

Caregen went public on the KOSDAQ in 2015, raising approximately $160 million. As of late 2023, Chung holds roughly 64% of the company.
