= Ottogi =

South Korean food processing company

Ottogi Corporation
- Type: Public
- Traded as: KRX: 007310
- Industry: Food processing
- Founded: May 1969; 57 years ago
- Founder: Ham Tae-ho
- Headquarters: Gangnam District, Seoul, South Korea (Ottogi Center); Anyang, Gyeonggi, South Korea (HQ)
- Area served: Worldwide
- Key people: Ham Young-joon (Chairman); Hwang Sung-man (President)
- Products: Curry; Instant food Condiments; Instant noodle Frozen food Tea
- Revenue: ▲KRW 2,739,036,859,209 (FY 2021)
- Subsidiaries: Ottogi Ramyon Co. Ltd. Ottogi Sesame Mills Co. Ltd. Ottogi Frozen Foods Co. Ltd.

Korean name
- Hangul: 오뚜기
- RR: Ottugi
- MR: Ottugi
- Website: Ottogi.co.kr

Ottogi Corporation (Korean: 오뚜기 (Note: 오뚜기 is a modified form of the Korean word 오뚝이, which means roly-poly toy.)) is a food manufacturing company headquartered in Anyang, South Korea. Ottogi Center is located in Seoul and is listed on the KOSPI 200.

== History ==
Ottogi was founded in May 1969 by Ham Tae-ho. Ottogi's first product was Ottogi Curry (powder curry), and it was the first Korean-made curry product. Ottogi also manufactured soup, ketchup, and mayonnaise in 1970, 1971, and 1972, for the first time in Korean history. After Ottogi was listed on the stock market in August 1994, its total revenue exceeded 1 trillion won (₩) in 2007, exceeded 2 trillion won (₩) in 2017, and exceeded 3 trillion won (₩) in 2022. Ottogi established a branch in China in 1994, a US branch in 2005, and a Vietnam Branch in 2007. Ottogi has affiliates such as Ottogi Ramyon Co. Ltd., Ottogi Sesame Mills Co. Ltd., Ottogi Frozen Foods Co. Ltd., etc.

Ottogi has achieved an integrated A grade in this year's evaluation by the Korea ESG Standards Institute (KCGS) in 2024, growing one step from the previous year (B+). The environment and governance categories rose from B+ to A and the social sector from A+ for the second consecutive year.

== Main business ==
Ottogi produces curry, seasoning, sauce, powder, HMR, retort pouch, dehydrated food, processed grain products, fish, livestock product, noodles, edible oils, spices, tea, and others.

Their main products are Ottogi Curry, Ottogi Tomato Ketchup, Ottogi 3 Minutes Meals, Ottogi Mayonnaise, Ottogi Cooked Rice, Jin Ramen, Ottogi Frozen Pizza, and Ottogi Canned Tuna.

== See also ==
- List of South Korean companies
- Korean cuisine
