= Hyundai Elevator =

South Korean elevator and escalator manufacturer

Hyundai Elevator Co., Ltd.
- Native name: 현대엘리베이터 주식회사
- Type: Public
- Traded as: KRX: 017800
- Industry: Manufacturing
- Founded: May 23, 1984; 42 years ago
- Headquarters: Chungju, South Korea
- Products: Elevators, escalators
- Parent: Hyundai Group
- Website: hyundaielevator.co.kr (English)

Hyundai Elevator Co., Ltd. (Korean: 현대엘리베이터 주식회사), a Hyundai Group subsidiary, is a South Korean company that manufactures elevators, escalators, moving walkways, and parking systems. Based in Chungju, South Korea, Hyundai Elevator has six overseas subsidiaries in China, Vietnam, Indonesia, Malaysia, Turkey, and Brazil and agents in 49 countries.

== History ==
Hyundai Elevator was established as a joint venture between Hyundai Electrical Engineering and Westinghouse Electric in 1984. Schindler Group, a Swiss-based company, succeeded Westinghouse's stake in Hyundai Elevator when Westinghouse disposed of its escalator business in 1989. Hyundai Elevator and Schindler deepened the relationship when KCC, a chemical company run by Hyundai founder's brother Chung Sang-young, attempted to take over Hyundai Group by acquiring Hyundai Elevator in 2003. Hyundai and Schindler agreed for the latter to purchase a 20-percent stake in Hyundai's elevator arm to fight back against KCC in 2004, but the domestic regulation annulled the agreement. Despite the invalidation, Schindler purchased a 25.5 percent stake in Hyundai Elevator from KCC after KCC failed to take over the Hyundai Group in 2006.

In 2019, Hyundai Elevator sold its primary facilities, including the main factory, dormitories, and headquarters, in Icheon to SK Hynix for ₩205 billion (2019) (equivalent to ₩240.32 billion or US$179.31 million in 2025). After the disposition, Hyundai relocated its headquarters to Chungju, North Chungcheong, in 2022.

In 2025, the company also announced plans to significantly expand its dividend payouts as part of a strengthened shareholder-return policy.

== See also ==
- List of elevator manufacturers
