= DN Solutions =

South Korean manufacturing company

DN Solutions Co., Ltd.
- Native name: 디엔솔루션즈
- Company type: Public
- Industry: Machine tools industry
- Founded: 1 July 1976; 49 years ago
- Headquarters: Changwon, South Gyeongsang Province, South Korea
- Products: machine tool
- Number of employees: 1,285 (2023)
- Parent: DN Automotive
- Website: www.dn-solutions.com

DN Solutions (Korean: DN솔루션즈) is a South Korean company that mainly manufactures machine tools and is a subsidiary of DN Automotive. As of 2023, it is ranked 3rd in the world in terms of sales in the machine tool industry.

== History ==
It was launched in 1976 as the machine tool division of Daewoo Heavy Industries. Afterwards, it went through Daewoo Heavy Industries and Doosan Infracore, and was converted into an independent corporation as Doosan Machine Tools in 2016.

In January 2022, it was acquired by DTR Automotive (now DN Automotive), a manufacturer of vibration damping components (VMS) that reduce noise and vibration in automobiles.

On January 28, 2026, DN Solutions completed the acquisition of Heller's shares. Heller is now a wholly owned subsidiary of DN Solutions.
