= LG CNS =

South Korean technology company

LG CNS Co., Ltd.
- Native name: 주식회사 엘지씨엔에스
- Type: Public
- Traded as: KRX: 064400
- Industry: Information technology
- Founded: January 1987; 39 years ago
- Headquarters: Seoul, South Korea
- Owner: LG (49.95%)
- Website: lgcns.com

LG CNS Co., Ltd. (Korean: 주식회사 엘지씨엔에스) is a South Korean technology company offering services in artificial intelligence, robotics, cloud computing, smart factories, smart logistics, system integration, and IT Outsourcing (ITO).

== History ==
LG CNS was founded in 1987 as System Technology Management (STM), a 50:50 joint venture between LG and Electronic Data Systems. In 1995, the company was renamed LG-EDS System as part of LG Group's corporate identity integration project. After LG acquired all of EDS's shares, the company changed its name to LG CNS in January 2002.

In 2019, LG sold a 35% stake in LG CNS to Macquarie Group for 1 trillion won (US$865 million). This sale occurred amid growing criticism of South Korea's chaebols for allegedly benefiting founding families by over-relying on outsourcing contracts and directing work to subsidiaries and affiliates. Macquarie acquired the stake in LG CNS with the condition that LG would list the company by April 2025. As a result, LG CNS debuted on the market in February 2025. On January 28, 2026, Macquarie divested its remaining 8.3% stake in the company through a block deal.

== Business ==
- Smart Factory: Incorporating Virtual Factory models and data-driven process intelligence, it improves manufacturing efficiency and leads factory automation engineering initiatives in North America for global affiliates. At the 'IoT Tech Expo 2026' held in San Jose, California,, LG CNS showcased 'Factova'—an intelligent factory optimization solution that applies AI, big data, and IoT across the entire manufacturing lifecycle. Furthermore, LG CNS became the first South Korean company to be selected as an official AI and IT services partner by Honeywell, jointly developing AI-powered factory automation and intelligence technologies to drive corporate AI Transformation (AX).
- Smart Logistics: LG CNS expands its logistics automation footprint from e-commerce to beauty, food, fashion, and defense sectors, providing intelligent logistics solutions. At 'MODEX 2026', North America's largest supply chain expo, the company unveiled its automated logistics robot, 'Mobile Shuttle'. Engineered to operate reliably in sub-zero environments down to -26°C, its flagship capability extends to cold-chain logistics for food and retail. Hundreds of these shuttle-robot-based automated systems are currently deployed at global affiliates' manufacturing facilities in North America.
- Enterprise Solutions: Integrating emerging digital technologies, LG CNS provides a proprietary suite of testing tools, middleware, and marketing technology platforms to modernize corporate business infrastructures.
  - ERP (Enterprise Resource Planning): Delivering full-lifecycle services from consulting and deployment to operations and optimization, the company promotes its 'AX on ERP' strategy, embedding Agentic AI to automate corporate business processes. It continues to strengthen its strategic partnership with SAP, showcasing its ERP capabilities annually at 'SAP Sapphire' since 2024. In 2025, LG CNS became the first South Korean company to join SAP’s Regional Strategic Services Partner (RSSP) initiative for the Asia-Pacific region.
  - PerfecTwin: A test automation system based on live transaction data validation technology. By accurately replicating live business context within simulated environments, it verifies systems before deployment to ensure transaction quality and stability.
  - LG Optapex: A global marketing technology platform driven by artificial intelligence (AI) and mathematical optimization algorithms. Tailored for the Amazon e-commerce ecosystem, it automates advertising operations, including 24/7 automated bidding, budget allocation, and performance forecasting. By integrating product-level data such as profit margins, fees, shipping costs, and inventory levels, the platform maximizes seller profitability in real time.
- AX (AI Transformation): LG CNS delivers enterprise-grade services driven by generative AI and Agentic AI. The company applies AI technologies across diverse industry sectors, including manufacturing, finance, public services, defense, and pharmaceuticals. It operates its proprietary platform, 'AgenticWorks', to assist enterprises in adopting AI agents. Furthermore, leveraging strategic technical collaborations with global big tech — such as OpenAI, Microsoft, Google Cloud, AWS, Cohere, Anthropic, and Palantir—the company actively deploys enterprise operations encompassing generative AI, data analytics, AI agents, and cloud-based AX business.
- RX (Robotic Transformation): LG CNS accelerates robotic commercialization through its 'Full-Stack RX Services', which strategically combine industry-specific Robot Foundation Models (RFM), hardware, and platforms. Through 'PhysicalWorks', the first integrated robot learning and operations platform developed by a South Korean firm, the company trains robots for real-world industrial tasks, manages task and workflow allocation, and provides central orchestration to monitor and operate heterogeneous robot fleets under a single platform. The company is also collaborating with U.S.-based robotics innovators, such as 'Dexmate' and the robotic brain development firm 'Skild AI,' to co-develop advanced physical AI systems.
- Cloud & AI Data Centers: The company delivers cloud transformation consulting, integration, and Managed Service Provider (MSP) services, along with data center infrastructure development. LG CNS became the first South Korean firm to secure an overseas AI data center construction project, with plans to complete a hyper-scale AI data center in Jakarta, Indonesia, by the end of 2026. In the cloud infrastructure sector, it maintains strategic partnerships with AWS, Microsoft Azure, and Google Cloud.

== See also ==
- List of IT consulting firms
