= Korea Zinc =

South Korean smelting company

Korea Zinc Company, Ltd.
- Native name: 고려아연
- Company type: Public
- Traded as: KRX: 010130
- Industry: Metallurgy
- Founded: 1974; 52 years ago
- Headquarters: Seoul, South Korea
- Revenue: ▲ ₩11.2194 trillion (2022)
- Operating income: ▼ ₩919.2 billion (2022)
- Net income: ▼ ₩798.3 billion (2022)
- Total assets: ▲ ₩12.0979 trillion (2022)
- Total equity: ▲ ₩9.2317 trillion (2022)
- Owner: Young Poong Corporation (47.46%); National Pension Service (7.86%); Hanwha H2 Energy USA Corp (7.68%); HMG Global LLC (5%); Treasury stocks (0.70%)
- Parent: Young Poong Group
- Website: www.koreazinc.co.kr

- Korea Zinc
- Hangul: 고려아연
- Hanja: 高麗亞鉛
- RR: Goryeo ayeon
- MR: Koryŏ ayŏn

Korea Zinc Company, Ltd. (Korean: 고려아연) is a non-ferrous metal smelter headquartered in Seoul, South Korea. It is one of the leading refined zinc-producing companies alongside Nyrstar, Hindustan Zinc, and Boliden. Korea Zinc produces 18 types of valuable metals and chemical products by processing various raw materials from zinc and lead concentrates to low-grade ore and scrap metal.

Korea Zinc was founded by Choi Ki-ho and Chang Byung-hee in 1974. Since its establishment, Korea Zinc has been co-managed by the Choi and Chang families.

== Operations ==
Korea Zinc has an annual production capacity of 650,000 tons of zinc and 420,000 tons of lead. In addition, while smelting the zinc and lead, Korea Zinc produces gold, silver, and sulfuric acid as byproducts. Korea Zinc's production base is the Onsan refinery located in Ulsan, South Korea. The company also manufactures and sells zinc ore through its Australian subsidiary, Sun Metals Corporation.

For 2023, Korea Zinc is constructing a 500 billion won ($370 million) nickel refinery in Ulsan, South Korea. The company has also established a joint venture for precursor production with South Korea's LG Chem and launched negotiations with Singapore's Trafigura for co-operation in nickel refining.

Trafigura, one of the leaders in the raw materials industry, has entered into an agreement with Korea Zinc to invest 185 billion won (US$140 million) in a nickel processing plant. Trafigura will take a 12.9 per cent stake in Korea Zinc's KEMCO. Also included in the agreement is a long-term raw material supply arrangement. Trafigura will supply between 20,000 and approximately 40,000 tonnes per year and will receive the right to purchase raw materials under the contract.

As of 2025, Korea Zinc is the only producer of antimony, bismuth, and indium in South Korea. The company circulates and concentrates smelting byproducts to produce those three rare metals, among others.

In April 2026, Korea Zinc acquired a smelter site and mines from Nyrstar in Tennessee.

== See also ==
- Sun Metals Solar Farm
