= KB Life Insurance =

South Korean life insurance company

KB Life Insurance Co, Ltd. (hangul:KB생명, 케이비생명) is a life insurance company, headquartered in Seoul, South Korea. As of 20 June 2013 fully owned by KB Group, KB Life originally was a joint venture between KB Group (51%) and ING Group (49%). KB Life was established in 2004 originally with a bancassurance only distribution model, but today has developed into a multichannel insurer, offering savings, annuities and protection products for Korean individuals and families.

== See also ==
- Economy of South Korea
- KB Group
- KB Life homepange

== Homepage ==
- KB Life Homepage
