= Young Poong Group =

South Korean conglomerate

Young Poong Corporation
- Native name: 주식회사 영풍
- Type: Public
- Traded as: KRX: 000670
- Industry: Metallurgy
- Founded: 1949; 77 years ago
- Headquarters: Seoul, South Korea
- Key people: Kim Giho (CEO)
- Website: www.ypzinc.co.kr/en

- Young Poong Group
- Hangul: 영풍
- Hanja: 永豊
- RR: Yeongpung
- MR: Yŏngp'ung

Young Poong Group is a South Korean chaebol (conglomerate) specializing in the mining, electronics, and book-selling industries. It was established in 1949 and is currently ranked among the 30 largest conglomerates in South Korea. In the 1970s, Young Poong expanded into metal smelting. In 2024, Young Poong attempted to buy Korea Zinc with MBK Partners.

== Subsidiaries ==
- Young Poong Books
- Korea Zinc
- Signetics

== See also ==
- Chaebol
- List of South Korean companies
