= Sun Metals Solar Farm =

Solar farm near Townsville, Queensland

- Country: Australia
- Location: Townsville, Queensland
- Coordinates: 19.437318°S 146.696015°E
- Status: Operational
- Commission date: May 2018
- Owner: Sun Metals

Solar farm
- Type: Flat-panel PV
- Collectors: Over 1 million
- Site area: 120 hectares (300 acres)

Power generation
- Nameplate capacity: 121 MW

The Sun Metals Solar Farm is a photovoltaic solar power station near Townsville in the Australian state of Queensland. It supplies some of the electricity consumed by the nearby Sun Metals (a subsidiary of Korea Zinc) zinc refinery as well as exporting to the National Electricity Market. When the Sun Metals Solar Farm started exporting electricity to the grid in May 2018, it took over from Clare Solar Farm as the largest capacity solar farm in Queensland.

The project statutory approvals were supported by AECOM Australia Pty Ltd.

Construction was undertaken by RCR Tomlinson. The solar farm is connected to the refinery's existing 33/132 kV substation and consists of over 1 million solar panels.

The photovoltaic cells are thin-film panels mounted on a fixed axis.
