= DN Automotive =

South Korean car parts company

DN Automotive Corp.
- Native name: 디엔오토모티브
- Company type: Public
- Traded as: KRX: 007340
- Industry: Automotive parts industry
- Founded: 23 June 1971; 54 years ago
- Headquarters: Yangsan, South Gyeongsang Province, South Korea
- Products: Automotive part
- Number of employees: 1,142 (2023)
- Website: www.dnautomotive.com

DN Automotive Corp. (Korean: DN오토모티브) is a South Korean manufacturer of car parts and batteries.

== History ==
Dong-A Tire Industry, the parent company of DN Group, established a company in Busan in 1971 and started the tire business. In 1992, the company expanded its business by establishing a dustproof business division, and in 1999, it entered the automotive battery business. In 2004, it established DTR, a dustproof parts subsidiary.

In 2009, it acquired Avon Automotive, a British auto parts manufacturer, and in 2014, it acquired CF Goma, an Italian anti-vibration parts company. In 2022, it acquired Doosan Machine Tools.

== Products ==
DN Automotive is the largest company in South Korea and the third largest in the world in producing automotive vibration damping parts. In 2005, It commercialized the world's first active mount technology that actively reduces vibration and noise using electronic control technology.

The company is the largest supplier of anti-vibration components to General Motors and Stellantis, and also supplies components to Tesla, Rivian, Nio. In particular, it participates in the development of GM and Stellantis' new vehicles from the beginning and jointly conducts technology development, investment, verification, and application tests.

For the battery business, there is an MF battery production plant in Ulsan.

== See also ==
- DN Solutions
