= Heller Group =

Manufacturer of milling machines

HELLER Group
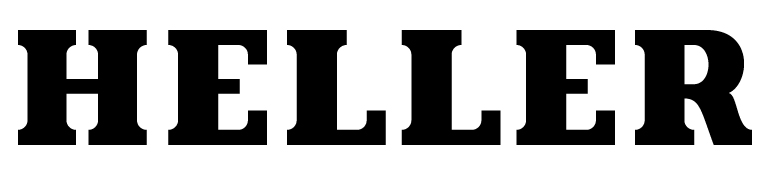
- Company type: Heller Holding SE & Co. KGaA represented by Heller Management SE
- Industry: Machine tool builder
- Founded: 1894; 132 years ago
- Founder: Hermann Heller
- Headquarters: Nürtingen, Germany
- Key people: Executive Board of Heller Management SE: Brandon Hyuk Kim (COO), Andreas Müßigmann (CAO), Thorsten Schmidt (CEO), Chang Soo Son (Sonderprojekt “HELLER New Business”), Simon Seung Ju Song (CFO) Chairman of the Supervisory board: Sung Won Park
- Products: Machine tools horizontal machining centers
- Revenue: EUR 435m (2024)
- Number of employees: 2,000 (2026)
- Website: www.heller.biz/en/

Heller (Gebr. Heller Maschinenfabrik GmbH) is a manufacturer of milling machines, manufacturing systems and crankshaft and camshaft machines. It is based in Nürtingen in the Stuttgart region of South Germany.

Its customers come from a variety of industries including automotive manufacturers and their suppliers, machine building industry, contract manufacturers, power engineering, tool and die manufacturing as well as aerospace companies.

== History ==
On February 7, 1894, 25-year-old Herman Heller founded the company Hermann Heller Handelsgeschäft und Produktion von geschützten Artikeln und Uhrmacherwerkzeug“ – which traded and manufactured patented products and watchmaker's tools. With a staff initially consisting of seven craftsmen and three apprentices, the company produced machinist vices, chimney cowls, fans and spiral stairs.

In 1898, Heller entered the machine building industry by producing cold circular metal sawing machines and saw blade skiving machines as well as thread cutting machines. In 1900, the original company was superseded by Gebr. Heller Maschinenfabrik GmbH founded by the brothers Ernst and Hermann Heller.

In 1940, the firm produced the first milling machines for the machining of crankshafts. After establishing subsidiaries in the UK and Brazil in 1970, Heller opened production facilities in Chicago, IL, USA in 1982.

In the year 2000, the company was awarded certification to ISO 9001, QS 9000, TES and VDA 6.4 standards. In the same year, HELLER doubled the production capacity of the company's production plant in the US and introduced a new internal milling machine for the machining of crankshafts.

In 2007, HELLER introduced the ModuleLine manufacturing system and presented the H series of machining centres at EMO in Hanover. In 2009, the company launched the F series for simultaneous 5-axis machining and in 2010 presented bevel gear machining on 5-axis machining centres from the MCH-C and F series. In 2013, HELLER together with Daimler AG was awarded with the German Innovation Award for Climate and Environment (IKU) for their arc spraying technology for the coating of cylinder surfaces in automobile engines.

On January 28, 2026, DN Solutions completed the acquisition of Heller's shares. Heller is now a wholly owned subsidiary of DN Solutions.

== Products ==
- 4-axis machining centres from the H series
- 5-axis machining centres from the HF and F series
- Automation: automated manufacturing and production centres
- Coating modules CBC 200 are used for coating cylinder bores in crankcases using CBC technology (CylinderBoreCoating)
- 5-axis machining centres for milling and turning operations from the C series
- Machines for crankshaft and camshaft machining of the RFK/DRZ/MCC 15/RFN series
- Flexible manufacturing systems
- Training machine CNC-ProfiTrainer to train horizontal machining centre operators

== Organisational structure ==
The HELLER Group operates production facilities around the globe, e.g. in Germany, UK, Brazil, United States and China. HELLER Services GmbH based in Nürtingen is a wholly owned subsidiary specialising in services and training. Additionally, HELLER is operating subsidiaries and representations in all relevant markets around the globe.

Recently, HELLER has been expanding its presence in the Asian market. Two examples are the TechnologyCenter in Pune/India founded in 2009 and the company's subsidiaries in Shanghai and Beijing. In 2013, a new production facility was opened in Changzhou, China.
