= Young Poong Books =

South Korean book shop chain

Young Poong Book Store Co., Ltd.
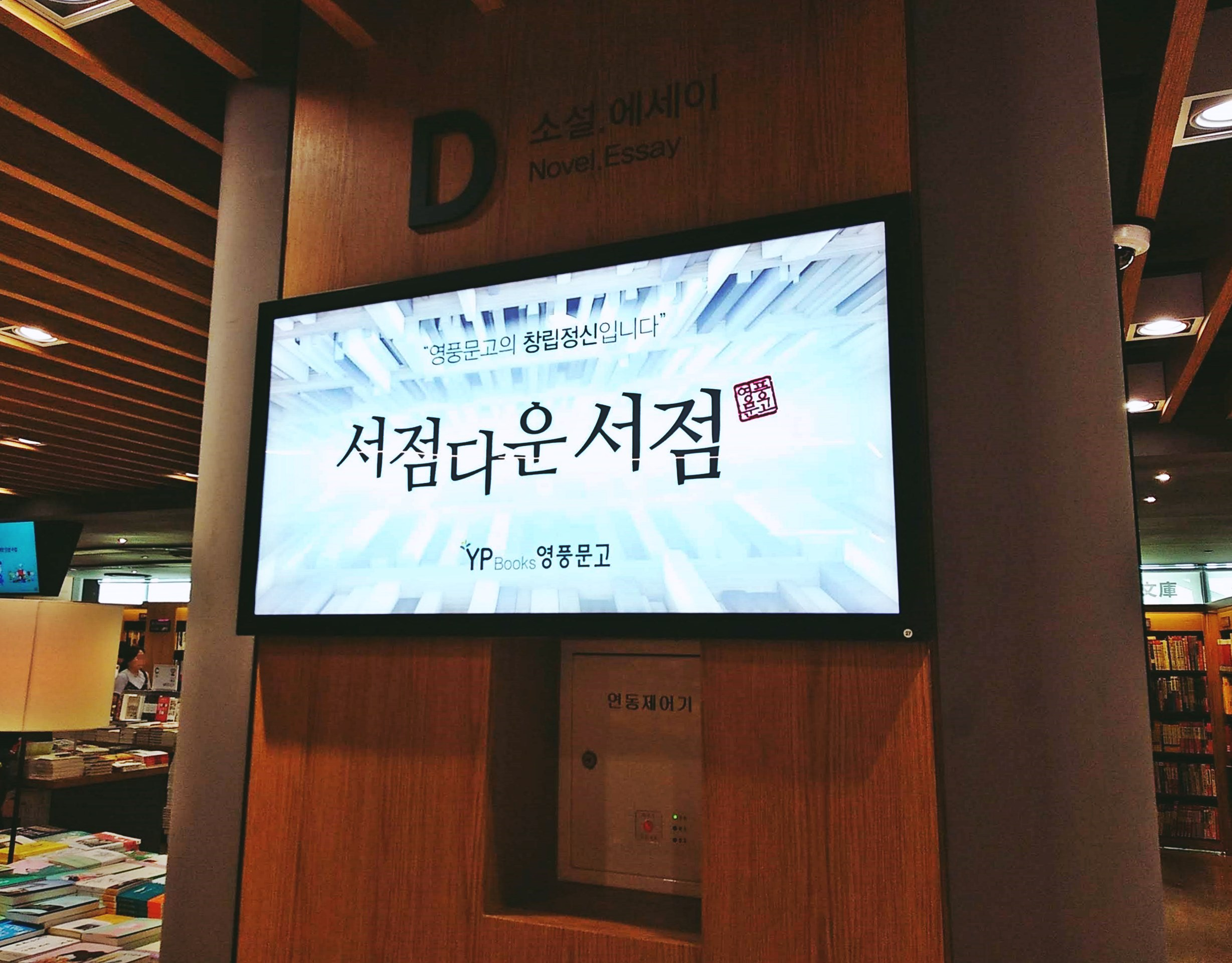
- Company type: Public (Korean: 영풍문고)
- Industry: Conglomerate
- Founded: 1992
- Headquarters: Seoul, South Korea
- Key people: Yong-il Choi, CEO
- Website: YP Books

Young Poong Books (YP Books) is a major South Korean book store chain headquartered in Gangnam-Gu, Seoul, South Korea. Along with Kyobo Book Centre and Bandi & Luni's, YP Books constitutes one of the three largest book store companies in South Korea. YP Books is a subsidiary of the Young Poong Group.

== See also ==
- List of book stores
