= Hana Financial Group =

South Korean financial holding company

Hana Financial Group Inc.
- Native name: 주식회사 하나금융지주
- Type: Public
- Traded as: KRX: 086790
- Industry: Financial services
- Founded: December 2005; 20 years ago
- Headquarters: Seoul, South Korea
- Key people: Kim Jung-Tai (CEO)
- Subsidiaries: Hana Bank
- Website: hanafn.com

Hana Financial Group Inc. (Korean: 주식회사 하나금융지주; RR: Jusik Hoesa Hana Geumyung Jiju) is a financial holding company headquartered in Seoul, South Korea.

== History ==
Hana Financial Group was established as Hana Bank's transition to a holding company. In 2005, Hana Bank was delisted and incorporated into Hana Financial Group as a subsidiary. In 2005, Hana Financial Group acquired Daehan Investment and Securities, then Korea's second-largest asset management company.

In 2012, Hana Financial Group acquired a 51.02 percent stake in Korea Exchange Bank (KEB) from Lone Star Funds for KRW 2.02 trillion. Due to opposition from the KEB labor union, the merger between KEB and Hana Bank was delayed until 2015, and the two banks operated independently under the Hana Financial Group umbrella. An arbitration suit for additional compensation filed by Lone Star was dismissed in May 2019.

For the year 2025, South Korea's four largest financial holding companies (KB Financial Group, Shinhan Financial Group, Hana Financial Group, and Woori Financial Group) reported a combined nearly 18 trillion won ($12.6 billion) in net profit. Specifically, Hana earned 4.0 trillion won, a 7.1% increase.

== Subsidiaries ==
- Hana Bank
- Hana Securities co., LTD (formerly Hana Financial Investment, Hana Daetoo Securities)
- KEB Hana Card
- Hana Capital
- Hana Life (formerly Hana HSBC Insurance)
- Hana Insurance
- Hana Savings Bank
- Hana Asset Trust
- Hana Alternative Asset Management
- Hana F&I
- Hana Ventures
- Hana Investor Services
- Hana TI
- Hana Financial Find
- Overseas Units: Hana Bank (China), PT Bank Hana (Indonesia), Hana Asia Limited (Hong Kong)
- BNB Hana Bank (Hana acquired BNB Bank in 2013): New Jersey and New York

Hana Financial, Inc. (Los Angeles) is not a member of Hana Financial Group. Founded in 1994, Hana Financial, Inc. is a non-bank financial institution, which offers factoring, asset based lending, and SBA lending. Hana Financial, Inc. has about $2 billion in annual factoring and loan originations.

== Overseas operations ==
Subsidiaries of Hana Financial Group are active in 24 countries and span Asia, the Americas, Europe, and the Middle East. In particular, Hana Financial Group has substantial equity investments in banks in China, Indonesia, and Vietnam.

In 2007 Hana Financial Group established a subsidiary in China, Hana Bank China. In 2009 Hana Bank China was licensed to perform transactions involving Renminbi and debit card transactions. A year later, Hana Financial Group acquired an 18.44% stake in the Bank of Jilin Co. Ltd. In January, 2011 the group entered into a strategic alliance with the China Merchants Bank.

Bank Bintang Manunggal was acquired by Hana Financial Group in 2007, and renamed PT. Bank Hana in 2008. The Indonesian subsidiary of Hana Financial Group acquired Bank KEB Indonesia as part of the group's global acquisition in 2014, and recently established LINE BANK by Hana Bank, a joint venture with LINE Financial Asia in 2021. In 2019, Hana Financial Group's subsidiary KEB Hana Bank acquired a 15% stake in BIDV in Hanoi, Vietnam.

== See also ==
- List of Banks in South Korea
- Bucheon Hana 1Q
- Daejeon Hana Citizen FC
