= KB Financial Group =

Korean financial services company

KB Financial Group Inc
- Native name: 주식회사 케이비금융지주
- Type: Public
- Traded as: KRX: 105560; NYSE: KB (ADR)
- ISIN: KR7105560007
- Industry: Financial services
- Founded: September 29, 2008 (holding company)
- Headquarters: Seoul, South Korea
- Key people: Yoon Jong-kyoo (chairman & CEO)
- Revenue: ▼US$17.2 billion (2022)
- Net income: ▼US$3.547 billion (2022)
- Total assets: ▼US$508 billion (2022)
- Subsidiaries: Kookmin Bank; KB Life Insurance
- Website: www.kbfg.com

KB Financial Group Inc (Korean: 주식회사 케이비금융지주; RR: Jusik-hoesa Keibi Geumyung Jiju) is a finance holding company headquartered in Seoul, South Korea. The Group and its subsidiaries provide a broad range of banking and financial services. It is one of the domestic systemically important banks (D-SIBs) identified by the Financial Services Commission.

== History ==
KB Financial Group was established through the restructuring of Kookmin Bank into a holding company in September 2008. Kookmin Bank launched a financial holding firm to boost non-banking operations such as brokerage, insurance, and consumer finance. After its establishment, KB acquired non-banking financial services companies, including LIG Insurance, Hyundai Securities, Prudential Life Korea, etc.

In 2015, KB acquired LIG Insurance, South Korea's fourth-largest non-life insurance company with assets totaling 24 trillion won, from LIG Group and changed its name to KB Insurance. KB also took over Hyundai Securities from Hyundai Group after beating Korea Investment and Hong Kong–based private equity firm Actis in 2016. KB has merged its existing stock brokerage firm KB Investment & Securities with Hyundai Securities and renamed it as KB Securities. In 2020, KB reinforced its life insurance business by acquiring a 100% stake in Prudential Financial Inc's South Korean unit for 2.3 trillion won.

In 2021, KB Financial Group bought a majority stake in the Indonesia-based Bank Bukopin and changed its name to KB Bukopin.

For the year 2025, South Korea’s four largest financial holding companies (KB Financial Group, Shinhan Financial Group, Hana Financial Group, and Woori Financial Group) reported a combined nearly 18 trillion won ($12.6 billion) in net profit. Specifically, KB posted the strongest growth, with net profit rising 15.1% to 5.84 trillion won.

In February 2026, it was announced that KB had broken above value for the first time. This milestone fueled expectations of a broader re-rating across domestic financial holding firms long viewed as chronically undervalued.

== Operations ==
There are 13 subsidiaries under KB Financial Group, including Kookmin Bank, KB Securities, KB Insurance, KB Kookmin Card, Prudential Life Insurance Korea, KB Asset Management, KB Capital, KB Life Insurance, KB Real Estate Trust, KB Savings Bank, KB Investment, KB Data Systems, and KB Credit Information.

== See also ==
- Uijeongbu KB Insurance Stars
