= Taihan Cable & Solution =

Taihan Cable & Solution Co., Ltd.
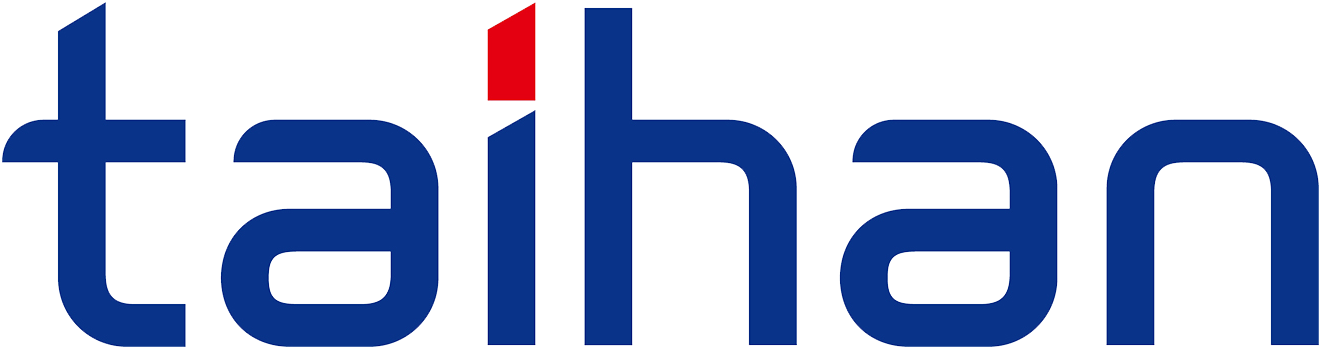
- Native name: 대한전선 주식회사
- Type: Public
- Traded as: KRX: 001440
- Founded: 1941; 85 years ago
- Headquarters: Seoul, South Korea
- Key people: Joon Seok Kim (CEO)
- Products: electric cable
- Parent: Hoban E&C Co., Ltd.
- Website: www.taihan.com/en

Taihan Cable & Solution Co., Ltd. (Korean: 대한전선 주식회사) is a Korean corporation known for manufacturing electric wires and stainless steel products for electricity and communication. It was established in 1941 as the first wire and cable company in South Korea. It is listed on the Korean Stock Exchange under Ticker symbol 001440. The current CEO is Jong Min Song.

== Operations ==
Taihan has a manufacturing plant in Gyeonggi-do and Chungcheongnam-do, Korea and a research center in Gyeonggi-do. It has overseas offices in South Africa, Democratic Republic of Congo, Vietnam, Hong Kong, Mongolia, the United States, Canada, United Arab Emirates, Saudi Arabia, Kuwait, Singapore, Malaysia, Thailand and Australia.

== Products and Services ==
- Power Generation&Distribution
- Communications Cable
- Base Metal
- System
- Supply of Telephone and Optical Fiber Cable
- Ultra-high-voltage cables and connecting parts
- Turnkey contract work for High Tension Power Cable Project
