= Certified Securities Investment Advisor =

- Hangul: 증권투자상담사
- Hanja: 證卷投資商談師
- RR: jeunggwon tuja sangdamsa
- MR: chŭngkwŏn t'uja sangdamsa

In South Korea, a Certified Securities Investment Advisor (CSIA) is a certified professional permitted to offer investment advice to clients and to accept purchase and sale orders for certain financial products on their behalf. The products which CSIAs are permitted to handle include stocks, bonds, mutual funds, beneficiary certificates, and equity-linked warrants; however, the handling of futures, options, and over-the-counter derivatives is reserved for Certified Derivatives Investment Advisors. As of 2010, there were 111,214 registered CSIAs.

To become a CSIA, one must pass the qualifying examination offered by the Korea Institute of Financial Investment, an arm of the Korea Financial Investment Association (KOFIA). In July 2008 (the 69th sitting of the examination), 16,117 candidates took the examination, of whom 5,687 (35%) passed. Among the examinees, 894 were employees of securities firms, while the remaining 4,793 were university students or other ordinary people. Younger people are also known to take the examination; for example, in July 2011, an 11-year-old primary school student passed the examination and became the youngest CSIA ever.
