= Standing proxy =

A standing proxy is one that exists until revoked. This is in contrast to a proxy that is designated for a temporary or one-time use. A special proxy takes priority over a standing proxy, and the standing proxy is temporarily suspended when the principal or his special proxy are present. As U.S. Securities and Exchange Commission (SEC) Info notes:

Any Shareholder may appoint a standing proxy or (if a corporation) representative by depositing at the Registered Office, or at such place or places, AND IN SUCH MANNER, INCLUDING BY ELECTRONIC MEANS, as the Board may [otherwise specify] DETERMINE for the purpose, a proxy or (if a corporation) an authorization and such proxy or authorization shall be valid for all general meetings and adjournments thereof or, resolutions in writing, as the case may be, until notice of revocation is received...Where a standing proxy or authorization exists, its operation shall be deemed to have been suspended at any general meeting or adjournment thereof at which the Shareholder is present or in respect to which the Shareholder has specially appointed a proxy or representative...A person so authorized as a representative of a corporation shall be entitled to exercise the same power on behalf of the grantor of the authority as the grantor could exercise if it were an individual Shareholder of the Company and the grantor shall for the purposes of these Bye-Laws be deemed to be present in person at any such meeting if a person so authorized is present at it.
