= CSAI =

CSAI may refer to:

- Catholic Scout Association in Israel
- CernySmith Assessment, formerly known as the CernySmith Adjustment Index
- Child pornography or child sexual abuse imagery
- Commissione Sportiva Automobilistica Italiana, the commission which oversees the Automobile Club d'Italia
- The interdisciplinary study of computer science and artificial intelligence
