= Leve Palestina =

1978 Swedish-Palestinian protest song

- Original cover of Mitt hemlands jord

Song by Kofia

from the album Mitt hemlands jord
- Language: Swedish
- Released: 1978
- Genre: Folk; world music
- Length: 2:50
- Songwriter: George Totari

"Leve Palestina" (Swedish pronunciation: [ˈlêːvɛ palɛsˈtîːna]; transl. "Long Live Palestine") is a 1978 protest song by Swedish-Palestinian band Kofia, written by its leader George Totari. A popular song at socialist protests since its release, it has gone viral since the onset of the Gaza war in 2023.

== History ==
The band Kofia (Swedish for 'keffiyeh') was formed in Gothenburg in 1972 by George Totari (born 1946 in Nazareth), a Palestinian musician who moved to Sweden in 1967 amid the Six-Day War and became naturalized, alongside four other musicians: Palestinian percussionist Michel Kreitem (born 1946 in Jerusalem), whose family was forced to relocate to Jordan between 1948–1952, and who moved out in 1967 following his Swedish girlfriend; Swedish singer Carina Olsson; Swedish flute player Bengt Carlsson; and Swedish guitar, mandolin and oud player Mats Lundälv. The band, whose formation changed various times over the years, was active in demonstrating against the Vietnam War and South African apartheid during the 1970s.

"Leve Palestina", which Totari wrote as a protest song in response to the limitations on openly criticizing Israel and the denial of Palestinian identity in the country at the time, was released as the last song of the 1978 album Mitt hemlands jord / أرض بلادي (Note: Romanized: ʾArḍ bilādī; both titles translate to "The Earth of My Homeland".) under the title "Demonstrationssången / تحيا فلسطين", (Note: Romanized: Taḥyā Filasṭīn; the Swedish title translates to "The Demonstration Song", the Arabic title to "Long Live Palestine".) and has subsequently become Kofia's best-known work. The lyrics of the song depict the harvesting of wheat and olives in Palestine and the throwing of rocks and firing of rockets at her enemies. "Leve Palestina" invokes the socialist struggle against imperialism, calling for the downfall of Zionism and liberation of Palestine. Kofia is recognized as the first case of a group singing about Palestine in a language other than Arabic, something which was met with mixed feelings among Arabs.

The song has been regularly chanted at demonstrations in Sweden since it was written, and has been censured by the Swedish authorities. On the International Workers' Day in 2019, pro-Palestinian activists sang "Leve Palestina" at a demonstration in Malmö, drawing condemnation by both right-wing press and the ruling Social Democratic Party. The youth wing of the Social Democratic Party was also reported to the police for singing the song, and accused of hate speech. It subsequently agreed not to sing the song.

== 2023 revival ==
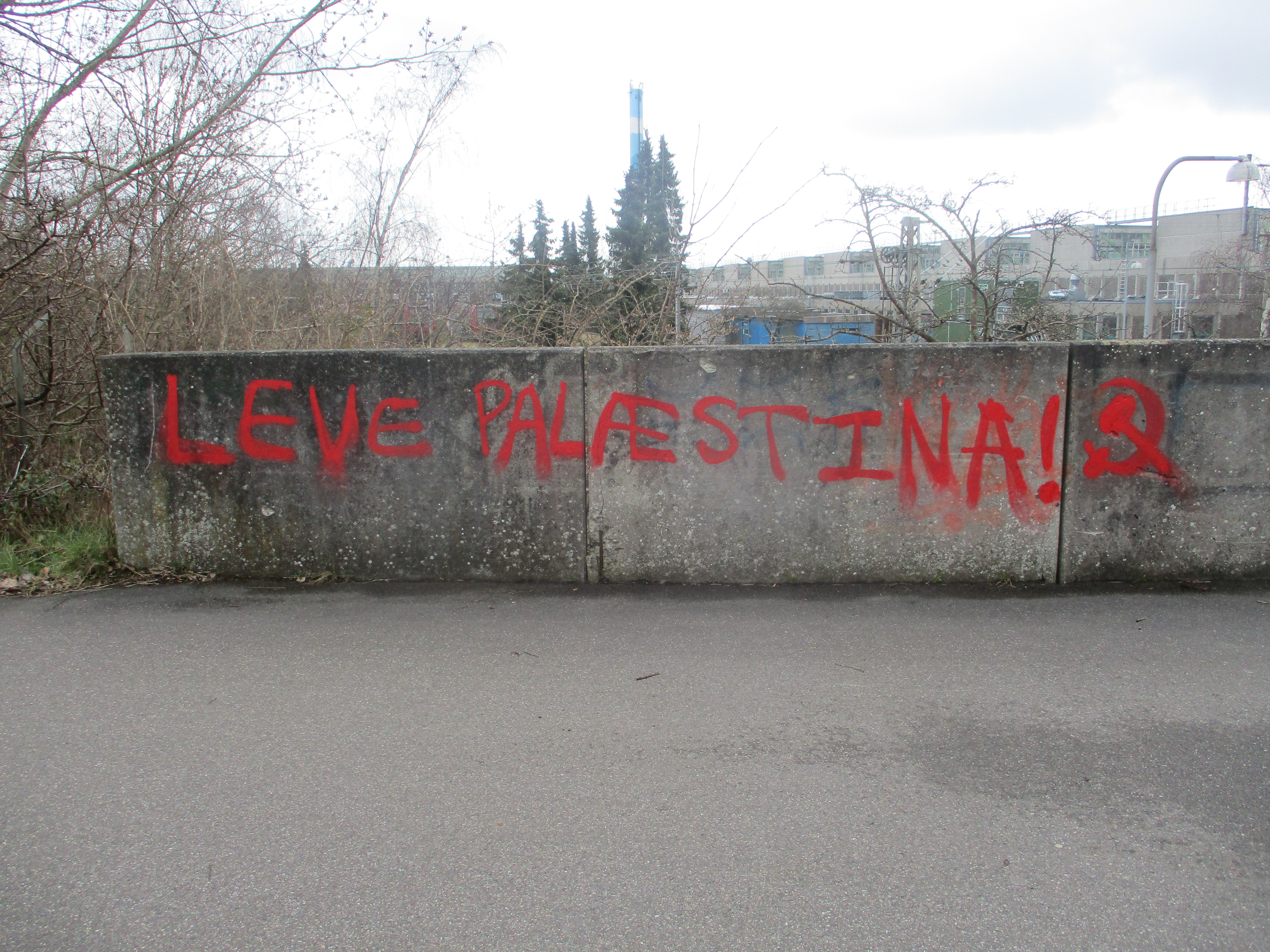
Graffiti with the Danish spelling of the song title accompanied by a hammer and sickle on a low wall in Høje Taastrup, Denmark

In the wake of the Gaza war and the Israeli siege of Gaza, the song has seen a major revival, spreading through platforms like TikTok and Instagram and becoming a rallying anthem at protests for the Palestinian cause across Europe.

The song's viral spread began with a 30-second clip of an October 2023 protest in Stockholm that one Swedish TikToker then set to the music of "Leve Palestina". That video has now been viewed five million times. The song has been heard at protests from Jakarta to Madrid, and has been translated into languages including English, Arabic, Hindi and Indonesian.

In the six months since the revival of "Leve Palestina" in October 2023, the song has drawn renewed criticism from the Swedish government. Despite calls from Sweden's ruling party to ban or censor the song, and the direction of the police to disrupt its performance, "Leve Palestina" continues to be sung at Swedish rallies – events where the thousands of attendees have made police action impractical.
