= HL Group =

South Korean conglomerate

HL Group INC.
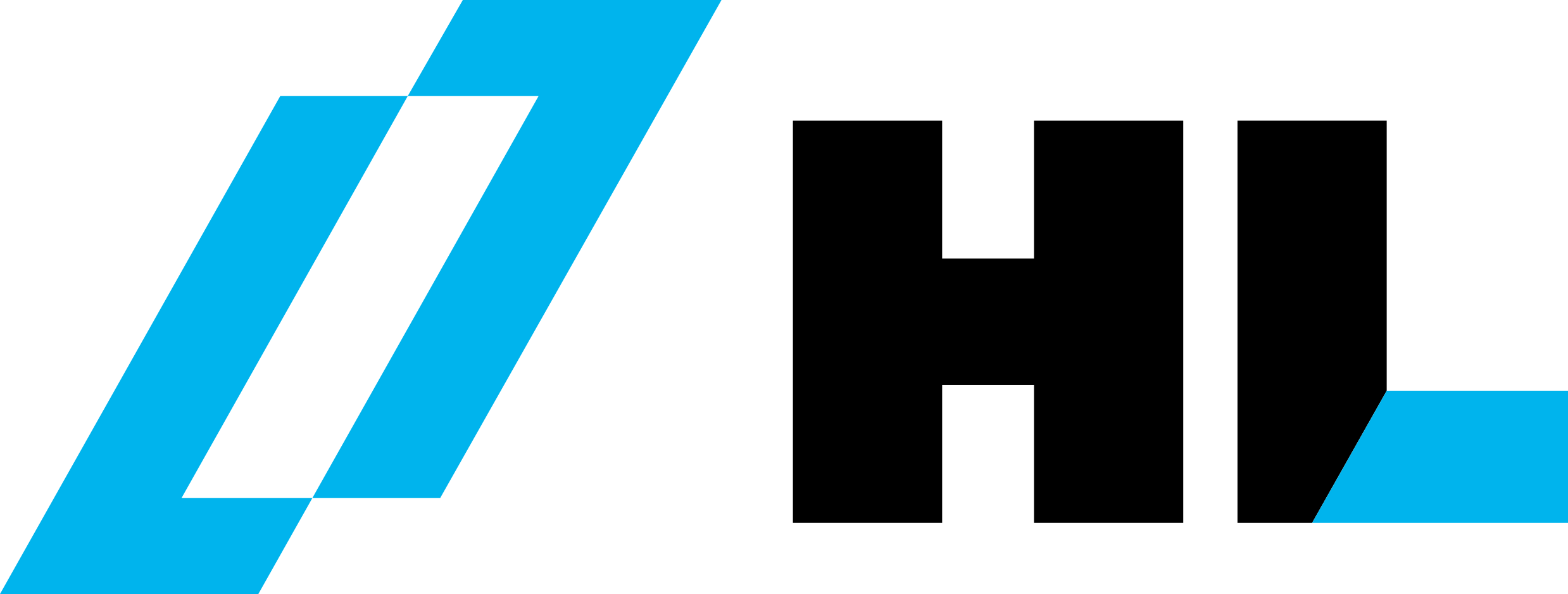
- Company type: Public
- Founded: September 1, 1962; 63 years ago
- Founder: Chung In-yung
- Headquarters: Songpa-gu Seoul, South Korea
- Area served: Worldwide
- Key people: Chung Mong-won (Chairman)
- Subsidiaries: HL Mando
- Website: www.hlcompany.com/en/index.jsp

HL Group (Korean: HL그룹), formerly Halla Group, is a South Korean chaebol that engages in automobile, construction, distribution/port, investment, education, and sports businesses in Korea and internationally. Its construction business comprises the provision of civil, architectural, housing, plant, and environmental works; supply of construction materials, such as remicon, compounds, and pile concrete; and manufacture and distribution of remicon and aggregates.

== History ==
Halla Group logo

Halla Group was founded as Hyundai International, Inc. in 1962. The Halla name was first used in 1978 as the name of a cement company. The name Halla is taken from Mount Halla, a mountain on Jeju Island.

Halla collapsed in 1997 during the 1997 Asian financial crisis.

In 2008 Halla repurchased Mando, a car company they sold during the financial crisis. The chaebol also sponsors multiple hockey teams, mainly Anyang Halla in the Asia League Ice Hockey and Kiekko-Vantaa in the Finnish Mestis.
