= Korea Exchange Bank =

1967–2015 South Korean bank

The Korea Exchange Bank (KEB; Korean: KEB 외환은행) was a bank in South Korea, established in 1967 and eventually merged with Hana Bank in 2015.

== History ==
Korea Exchange Bank was established in 1967 as a government-owned bank specializing in foreign exchange transactions. In January 1975, it started a securities business, and in April 1978 launched Korea's first credit card service. It was the official sponsor bank for 1986 Asian Games and 1988 Summer Olympics.

KEB was partly privatized in 1989 through a so-called citizen share ownership plan, following which the government retained a 51-percent equity stake while the other 49 percent were distributed widely to the Korean citizenry, and was then one of Korea's leading commercial banks. In April 1994, its shares were Listed on the Korea Exchange. Following the 1997 Asian financial crisis, Commerzbank invested $249 million into KEB in 1998 and acquired a 30 percent equity stake, mainly by converting prior credit to KEB into equity.

In June 2002, KEB introduced ATM services in foreign currency, a first for Korea. That same year during the 2002 FIFA World Cup in Korea and Japan, KEB was the first Korean bank to export South Korean won to another nation, by exporting bundles of 10,000 won notes to Japan.

Korea Exchange Bank was acquired in 2003 by Lone Star Funds, a private U.S. equity fund, as part of the general reorganization of the South Korean financial sector following the 1997 Asian financial crisis. In 2006, Lone Star tried to sell the company to the highest bidder, Kookmin Bank, but the plan was scrapped when it faced investigations by South Korean prosecutors and regulators.

In September 2007, HSBC agreed to purchase a controlling stake for $6 billion, but the sale was not approved by the South Korean government. In September 2008, Kookmin Bank and Hana Bank were considered for a takeover of KEB after HSBC failed to acquire the bank in 2007.

In February 2012, Hana Financial Group completed its ₩4.4 trillion (equivalent to ₩5.59 trillion or US$3.93 billion in 2025) purchase of Korea Exchange Bank from Lone Star Funds and Export–Import Bank of Korea.

== Controversy ==
Issues arose in the process of the acquisition and sale of KEB by Lone Star, which caused conflicts between Lone Star Funds and South Korean regulatory authorities.

According to the Banking Act of South Korea, Article 2 defines, "The term "non-financial business operator" means a person falling under any of the following items:

(a) The same person with respect to which the total amount of gross capital (referring to the gross amount of assets less the gross amount of debts, on the balance sheet; hereinafter the same shall apply) of persons who are non-financial companies (referring to companies that run such non-financial businesses as determined by the Presidential Decree; hereinafter the same shall apply) is not less than 25/100 of the total amount of gross capital of persons who are companies;

(b) The same person with respect to which the total amount of gross capital of persons who are non-financial companies is not less than such an amount as prescribed by the Presidential Decree, which is not less than two trillion won; and

(c) A securities investment company under the Securities Investment Company Act (hereinafter referred to as the "securities investment company") with respect to which a person as referred to in item (a) or (b) holds more than 4/100 of the total number of the issued stocks (referring to the case that the same person owns stocks under his or another person's name or has voting rights to them through a contract, etc.; hereinafter the same shall apply)."

Therefore, Lone Star Funds might have been considered as non-financial business operator.

=== Acquisition of KEB by Lone Star ===
In 2003, Lone Star Funds tried to acquire Korea Exchange Bank. It was controversial because, according to the Banking Act, a non-financial business operator is not entitled to acquire a bank unless a bank's BIS ratio is below 8%. Consequently, the president of KEB, Kang-won Lee sent a report that Korea Exchange Bank's BIS ratio was assessed as 6.16% as of July 25, 2003. Based on the report, the Financial Supervisory Service approved the acquisition. Hence, Lone Star Funds was able to acquire the bank at the price of about 1.3 billion dollars as of October 2003.

However, after the acquisition, as the stock price of Korea Exchange Bank rose, Lone Star got about $1 billion of appraisal profit within 3 months. Therefore, in the National Assembly inspection of 2005, is arisen the suspicion that Korea Exchange Bank was sold at a significantly lower price than its fair market value because BIS ratio was assessed with the pessimistic scenario, given that KEB's BIS ratio had been assessed between 8.24% and 9.14% according to the three reports written between May 17, 2003, and July 16, 2003. Thus, the National Assembly ordered the Board of Audit and Inspection to investigate the suspicion.

In June 2006, the Board concluded that the BIS ratio of 6.16% was assessed as unreasonably low under the unrealistically pessimistic scenario. Following the conclusion of the Board of Audit and Inspection, in November 2006, the prosecution started an investigation on the issue and prosecuted Kang-won Lee, the former president of Korea Exchange Bank, for breach of duty. In November 2008, the trial court ruled for Lee, and the verdict did not change in both appellate court and the Supreme Court.

=== Acquisition of KEB by Hana Financial Group ===
From January 2006, Lone Star Funds pursued the sale of KEB. However, during the period, there were ongoing investigations and trials regarding KEB, and thus South Korea's financial regulators did not approve each attempt. The disapproval was because the potential possibility of Lone Star's invalid ownership depending on the results of the trial. In September 2007, Lone Star Funds and HSBC had a preliminary agreement for the sale of KEB. However, the Financial Services Commission was still holding off on the approval. During the 2008 financial crisis, on September 19, 2008, HSBC gave up the acquisition of KEB. Eventually, on February 9, 2012, Lone Star Funds were forced to sell the KEB to Hana Financial Group due to the guilty verdict from the Korea Exchange Bank Credit Service stock manipulation case.

On November 22, 2012, Lone Star brought arbitration against South Korea before the International Center for Settlement of Investment Disputes (ICSID). Lone Star Funds alleged the Korean regulatory authorities' failures to approve the purchase by third parties of the claimant's stake in Korea Exchange Bank, and the unfair imposition of arbitrary capital gains taxes on the sale by Korean tax authorities. Lone Star claimed that the delay of approving Lone Star's sale of KEB shares until the forced sale was illegitimate because it was upon the hostility of public opinion against Lone Star Funds, and the delay caused the financial loss because they had lost other chances to sell at a higher price due to the delay. In addition, Lone Star claimed that South Korea's tax authorities applied inconsistent and arbitrary standards for the transfer income tax regarding the sale of KEB shares for the purpose of extracting the maximum amount of taxes from Lone Star. For the compensation, Lone Star Funds demands about $4.7 billion, and the arbitration is ongoing in 2020.

== See also ==
- List of banks in South Korea
