= HL Mando =

South Korean auto parts company

HL Mando Corporation
- Native name: 에이치엘만도 주식회사
- Company type: Public
- Traded as: KRX: 204320
- Industry: Automotive
- Founded: September 1, 2014; 11 years ago
- Headquarters: Seongnam, South Korea
- Products: Brake, Steering, Suspension Systems, Chassis, Automotive Components, Automotive Safety and ADAS
- Parent: HL Group
- Website: hlmando.com

HL Mando Corporation (Korean: 에이치엘만도 주식회사), with headquarters in Seoul, Korea, is the largest global Tier 1 Korean Original Equipment Manufacturer and supplier to General Motors, Cadillac, Ford, Chrysler, Chevrolet, Nissan, Kia Motors Company, Fiat, Volkswagen, BMW, Suzuki, Hyundai Motor Company, and many other global automobile distributors. It has an annual profit topping over US$6 billion every year. It is currently owned and run by the original founding parent company, Halla Group. It was handed over to Halla by Sunsage B.V, a daughter company of JP Morgan.

In 2014, Mando was split into two companies, with the legal successor changing its name to Halla Holdings and a new entity named Mando being created. This was done to create a holding company.

Mando has three main areas of business: Steering parts, Brake parts, and Suspension parts. Mando has recently opened a joint-venture company with Hella, to produce ABS sensor software algorithm.

Additionally, Mando is part of a Halla Group. which is composed of Automobile, Logistics, Investment banking, Ground transportation, Education, Construction, and sports and Entertainment companies with over 10,000+ employees around the world. These companies are all part of the same ownership under one CEO.

== History ==
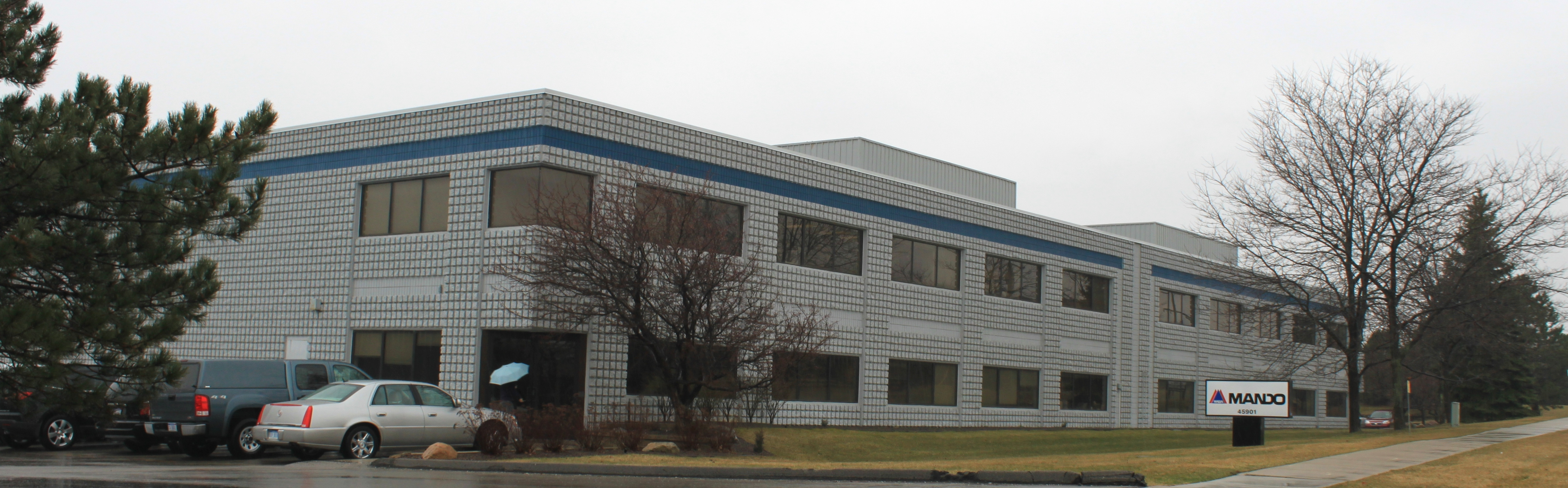
Mando America office, Plymouth, Michigan. Since have moved to new location in Novi, MI

Mando was created under the original founder of Halla Business Group, Mr. Chung In-Yung, (father of Chung Mong-won and younger brother of Chung Ju-yung who founded Hyundai Motor Company), on 1 October 1962. Initially, the company was named Hyundai International Inc. and changed its name to Mando Machinery Corporation in February 1980. In 1988, Mando opened the Brake System Plant in Pyeongtaek and two years later, opened the Munmak Steering System Plant (currently renamed Wonju operations). By 1995, Mando Machinery had a suspension system plant in Iksan as well as a dedicated R&D center. Mando America Corporation (MAC) was founded in 1996. In 1999, during the financial crisis, Mando was sold to Sunsage and was promptly renamed as Mando Corporation. Halla Group repurchased Mando Corporation subsequently.

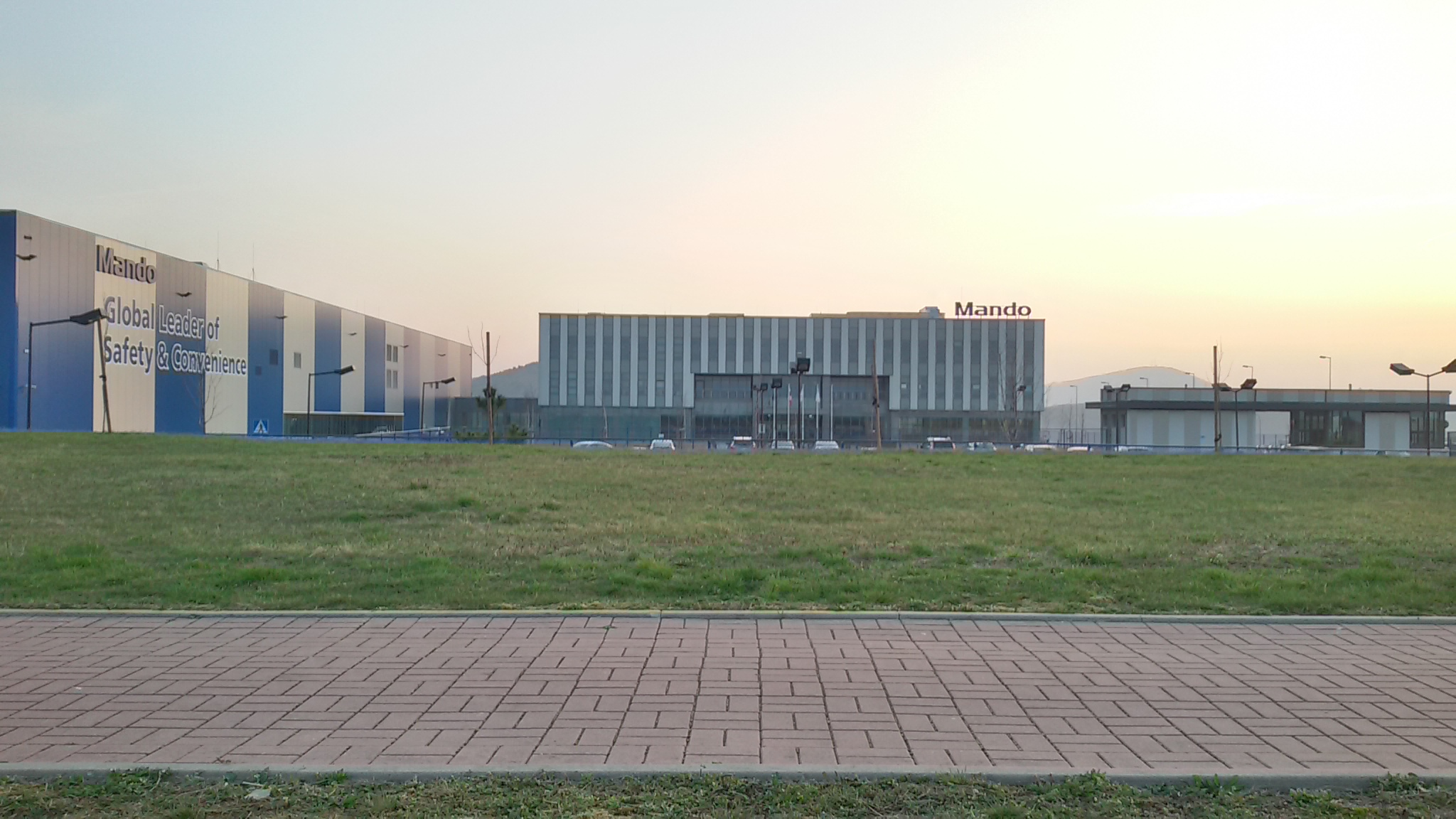
Mando office and production plant in Wałbrzych, Poland.

As of 2013, Mando Corporation has six affiliated locations within Michigan, Alabama, and Georgia in the United States. Its headquarters is in Seoul, South Korea. Its affiliates have a 1300-employee presence in North and South America. It is projected that Mando's affiliates will employ roughly 2,400 employees in the United States alone by 2017. In the overall scope, Mando Corporation has corporate offices, research & development facilities, assembly lines, casting plants, and other various functions worldwide such as China, Turkey, Brazil, India, Japan, Sweden, Germany, Poland, Australia, and Malaysia. Worldwide, the manufacturer employs over 10,000+ workers, and has an annual revenue of more than $6 billion. Mando Corporation provides a highly advanced and quality brakes, suspension, and steering parts to General Motors, Volkswagen, Chrysler, Ford, Nissan, Hyundai, Kia, Suzuki, Chevrolet, and many other automobile manufacturers worldwide.

== Products ==
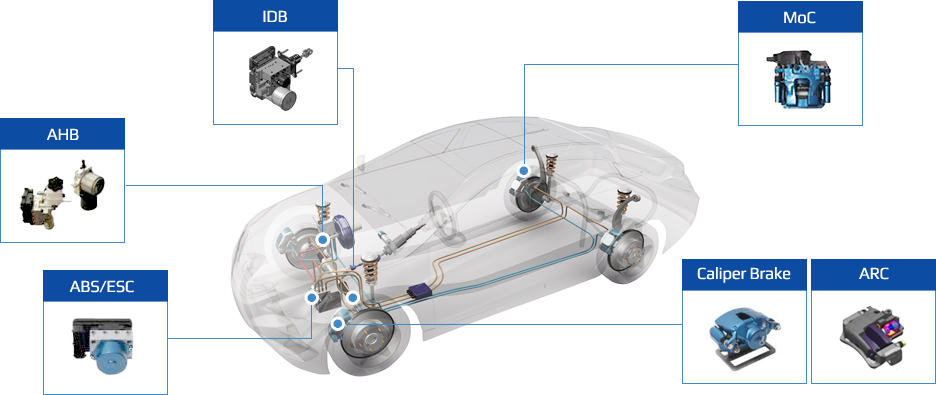
Product System Diagram

Mando products include -

- Brake Systems

- Drum Brake - Master Cylinder & Booster - ABS, ESC, AHB - EPB, MoC

- Steering Systems

- Steering Gear System - Manual Steering Gear - Hydraulic Power Steering Gear - Intermediate shaft - Steering Column - Electric Power Steering (DP-EPS, R-EPS, C-EPS)

- Suspension Systems

- Damper Spring Module - Shock Absorber - Suspension Strut - Self-Levelizer - Semi-Active Suspension

- Driver Assistance Systems

- Smart Cruise Control - Lane Keeping Assist System - Smart Parking Assist System - Blind Spot Detection - Autonomous Emergency Braking

- Electronics-Iron Casting

- Power Pack - Yaw & G Sensor - Ultrasonic Sensor - Torque Sensor - Torque Angle Sensor - 77 GHz/24 GHz Radar - Front Camera Module

== Legal ==
In 2016, Mando was served with two separate patent infringement lawsuits from Bosch GmbH and Jaguar Land Rover Limited for multiple products. This is in addition to Nexteer Automotive Corporation v. Mando America Corporation alleging trade secret theft and other numerous claims. Mando is not new to lawsuits as it has faced lawsuits regarding various discrimination claims in the past.
