= Korea Financial Investment Association =

- Type: Self-regulatory organization
- Location: Yeouido, Seoul, South Korea
- Founded: February 4, 2009; 16 years ago
- Key people: Park Jong Soo (chairman); Jin Woong Nam (vice chairman)
- Website: eng.kofia.or.kr

The Korea Financial Investment Association (KOFIA; Korean: 금융투자협회; RR: Geumnyung Tuja Hyeophoe) is a non-profit, self-regulatory organization (SRO) in South Korea, founded under the Financial Investment Services and Capital Markets Act. It was established on February 4, 2009 through the merger of the Korea Securities Dealers Association, the Korea Futures Association, and the Asset Management Association of Korea.

== Overview ==
KOFIA's goals are to ensure fair business practices among members, the fair trading of securities and investor protection, and the development of the nation’s capital market and financial investment services industry.

KOFIA performs five major functions: self-regulation, market management, upgrading the financial investment industry, the education and training of professionals, and fostering a sound investment culture. As the primary SRO, KOFIA oversees a wide spectrum of areas in the Korean financial investment industry. All securities, asset management and futures firms in Korea are KOFIA members and are subject to KOFIA’s self-regulatory operations.

Previously having launched KOSDAQ, KOFIA is now operating FreeBoard, an OTC Bulletin Board, and the OTC Bond Market. KOFIA offers services such as making policy recommendations, providing member services and guiding the globalization of the Korean financial industry.

By operating the Korea Institute of Financial Investment (KIFIN), KOFIA cultivates industry professionals. As a founding member of the International Forum for Investor Education (IFIE), KOFIA established the Korea Council for Investor Education (KCIE), which works to instill a sound investment culture, pioneering investor education in Korea. KOFIA consists of 244 members as of the end of July 2009. KOFIA also oversees the licensing of investment professionals such as Certified Securities Investment Advisors and Certified Derivatives Investment Advisors.

== History ==
Korea's Financial Investment Services and Capital Markets Act was enacted to advance the Korean financial market by improving the competitive edge of the nation's capital market and financial investment industry. In response, the Korea Securities Dealers Association, the Asset Management Association of Korea and the Korea Futures Association merged to form the Korea Financial Investment Association (KOFIA) in February 2009.
