= Hanil Cement =

South Korean cement company

- Type: Public
- Traded as: KRX: 300720
- Industry: Cement
- Founded: 1961; 65 years ago
- Headquarters: Seoul, South Korea
- Area served: Worldwide
- Key people: Ki Ho Hur (Chairman); Jeon Geun-shik (CEO)
- Products: Cement
- Revenue: Won 1,377,334 million (2015)
- Operating income: Won 120,632 million (2015)
- Net income: Won 64,884 million (2011)
- Website: www.hanil.com

Hanil Cement Co, Ltd. Korean: 한일시멘트(Hanja: 韓一-) is a cement, concrete and chemical company headquartered in Seoul, Korea, established in 1961. It produces portland cement products and cement under the brand Remital.

== History ==
Huh Chae-kyung founded Hanil Cement Co. in 1961, as the second oldest cement company in South Korea.

== Acquisition of Hyundai Cement ==
In 2007, a consortium of Hanil Cement and LK Investment Partners acquired a controlling stake of 84.56 percent stake or 14.17 million shares of Hyundai Cement from 32 creditors The two companies formed HLK Holdings, a special purpose company, to acquire the shares.

== Price Fixing ==
South Korea's Fair Trade Commission (FTC) fined Hanil Cement with 44.6 billion won which has colluded to rig the prices of cement products by controlling output and market share in 2011.

== Price Manipulation Investigation ==
In July 2020, the special judicial police squad of the Financial Supervisory Service (FSS) of South Korea raided the headquarters of Hanil Cement and the house of Huh Gi-ho, co-chief executive of Hanil Holdings Co. The FSS charged that for the merger of Hanil Holdings' daughter company, HLK Holdings and Hanil Cement, Hanil Holdings and Mr. Huh Gi-ho leveraged insider information to manipulate the stock prices in order to gain the greater control of the combined company.

== See also ==
- Economy of South Korea
