= KOSDAQ =

Trading board of Korea Exchange

- Hangul: 코스닥
- RR: Koseudak
- MR: K'osŭdak

The Korea Securities Dealers Automated Quotations (KOSDAQ; Korean: 코스닥) is a trading board of Korea Exchange (KRX) in South Korea established in 1996. Initially set up by Korea Financial Investment Association as an independent stock market from the Korean Stock Exchange, it was benchmarked from the American counterpart, NASDAQ. KOSDAQ is an electronic stock market, just like NASDAQ. The open hours for the market are 09:00AM to 03:30PM KST.

It is now operated as SME Market Division of KRX. As of February 2021, 1476 companies are listed on KOSDAQ for trading.

== History ==
In April 1987, the Market Organization was achieved, and the first three companies were registered.

On May 17, 1996, the KOSDAQ Securities Exchange (코스닥증권시장) was established in order to vitalize, modernize and fully computerize the market. KOSDAQ went into fully service on July 1, 1996.

During the 1997 Asian financial crisis, KOSDAQ market indexes plummeted and investors suffered heavy losses, but due to the quick recovery of the South Korean Economy, KOSDAQ saw rapid recovery and increase in market capitalization through the early 21st century.

== See also ==
- KOSPI
- KOSPI 200
- Korea Financial Investment Association
- List of East Asian stock exchanges
