= Korea Exchange =

Securities exchange operator in South Korea

- 한국거래소

- Type: Stock exchange
- Location: Busan & Seoul, South Korea
- Coordinates: 35°08′12″N 129°03′53″E (Busan)
- Founded: 1956; 70 years ago
- Key people: Sohn Byung-doo (Chairman & CEO)
- Currency: South Korean won
- No. of listings: 2,901 (as of January 2026)
- Market cap: ₩4,277 trillion KRW ($2.95 trillion USD)
- Indices: KOSPI; KOSPI 200; KOSDAQ
- Website: www.krx.co.kr global.krx.co.kr

- Korea Exchange
- Hangul: 한국거래소
- Hanja: 韓國去來所
- RR: Hanguk georaeso
- MR: Han'guk kŏraeso

Korea Exchange (KRX; Korean: 한국거래소) is the sole securities exchange operator in South Korea. It is headquartered in Busan, and has an office for cash markets and market oversight in Seoul.

== History ==
The Korea Exchange was created through the integration of Korea Stock Exchange (KSE), Korea Futures Exchange and KOSDAQ Stock Market under the Korea Stock & Futures Exchange Act. The securities and derivatives markets of former exchanges are now business divisions of Korea Exchange: the Stock Market Division, KOSDAQ Market Division and Derivatives Market Division. As of December 2020, Korea Exchange had 2,409 listed companies with a combined market capitalization of ₩2.3 quadrillion KRW (US$2.1 trillion). The exchange has normal trading sessions from 09:00 am to 03:30 pm on all days of the week except Saturdays, Sundays and holidays declared by the Exchange in advance.

On 22 May 2015, the Korea Exchange joined the United Nations Sustainable Stock Exchanges initiative in an event with the UN-SG Ban Ki-moon in attendance, as well as senior officials from UN Global Compact and UNCTAD.

On 10 April 2025, the KOSPI and KOSDAQ soared when President Donald Trump announced that he would suspend the mutual tariffs. In response, the Korea Exchange triggered a buy sidecar for the KOSPI market at 09:06 a.m. for the first time in eight months.

In April 2025, the Korea Exchange signed a contract with the Thai Stock Exchange to supply the system for liquidation and settlement. A source at the exchange said it expects the deal to further strengthen the position of the Korean stock market infrastructure in Southeast Asia. In June 2026, South Korea became the sixth largest stock market in the world in terms of market capitalisation.

Starting from 14 September 2026, the Korea Exchange extended trading hours on the KOSPI and KOSDAQ for four hours from 04:00 p.m. to 08:00 p.m. This followed the regular trading hours of 09:00 a.m. to 03:30 p.m.

== Traded instruments ==
KOSPI Market Division

- Stocks
- Bonds
- Exchange-traded funds (ETFs)
- Exchange-Linked Warrants (ELWs)
- Real estate investment trusts (REITs)

KOSDAQ Market Division

- Stocks

Derivatives Market Division

- Index Instruments: KOSPI 200 Index Futures, KOSTAR Futures, KOSPI 200 Index Options
- Single Stock Futures
- Equity Options
- Interest Rate Instruments: 3-Year KTB (Korea Treasury Bond) Futures, 5-Year KTB Futures, 10-Year KTB Futures
- Foreign Exchange Instruments: USD Futures, JPY Futures, EUR Futures, USD Options
- Commodity Instruments: Gold Futures, Mini-gold Futures, Lean Hog Futures

== Trading hours ==
Session		Trading Hours	Quotation Receiving Hours
Regular Session		09:00 ~ 15:30	08:00 ~ 15:30
Off-hours Session	Pre-hours	07:30 ~ 09:00	07:30 ~ 09:00
Off-hours Session	Post-hours	15:40 ~ 18:00	15:30 ~ 18:00

Quotations are quotes submitted by the Members on behalf of their customers and are submitted to the Exchange only during Quotation Receiving Hours.

Trading days in KRX KOSPI markets are from Monday through Friday and no trading or settlement is made on the following days:

- Holidays according to government regulations (which includes Sundays, National Election days, etc)
- Labor Day (May 1st)
- Saturdays
- December 31st when it's a holiday or a Saturday, otherwise the previous business day closest to December 31st
- Certain days deemed necessary by the KRX due to market conditions.

== See also ==
- Miracle on the Han River
- Economy of South Korea
- Korea Financial Investment Association
