= List of South Korean billionaires by net worth =

This is a list of South Korean billionaires (by US$) based on an annual assessment of wealth and assets compiled and published by Forbes magazine.

On the 2026 list, published in April 2026, the collective net worth of South Korea's 50 richest reached an all-time high of US$175 billion, up 77 percent from the previous year, driven by a semiconductor boom linked to demand for artificial intelligence; the minimum net worth to qualify rose to $1 billion. Net worths were measured as of March 27, 2026.

== 2026 South Korean billionaires list ==
Rank	Name	Net worth (USD)	Source of wealth
1	Lee Jae-yong	21.6 billion	Samsung Electronics
2	Michael Kim	9.9 billion	MBK Partners
3	Seo Jung-jin	8.1 billion	Celltrion
4	Cho Jung-ho	8 billion	Meritz Financial Group
5	Lee Boo-jin	7.9 billion	Samsung Electronics, Hotel Shilla
6	Lee Seo-hyun	7.5 billion	Samsung Electronics
7	Chung Mong-koo	7.3 billion	Hyundai Motor
8	Hong Ra-hee	7.1 billion	Samsung Electronics
9	Chung Eui-sun	6.3 billion	Hyundai Motor
10	Yoon Dae-in	5.9 billion	Sam Chun Dang Pharm
11	Kwak Dong Shin	5.7 billion	Hanmi Semiconductor
12	Park Hyeon-joo	4.9 billion	Mirae Asset Financial Group
13	Kim Beom-su	3.8 billion	Kakao
14	Bom Kim	3.2 billion	Coupang
15	Kim Jung-min & Jung-youn	3.15 billion	Nexon (inheritance from Kim Jung-ju)
16	Kwon Hyuk-bin	3.1 billion	Smilegate
17	Cho Hyun-joon	2.95 billion	Hyosung
18	Chey Tae-won	2.9 billion	SK Group
19	Kim Jun-ki	2.85 billion	DB Group
20	Chung Mong-joon	2.8 billion	HD Hyundai
21	Kim Byung-hoon	2.7 billion	APR
22	Park Soon-jae	2.6 billion	Alteogen
23	Yoo Jung-hyun	2.5 billion	Nexon
24	Lee Dong-chae	2.4 billion	EcoPro
25	Song Chi-hyung	2.3 billion	Dunamu
26	Chung Yong-ji	2.25 billion	Caregen
27	Koo Bon-neung	2.2 billion	Heesung Group
28	Chung Yong-jin	2.1 billion	Shinsegae
29	Kim Jung-soo & Chun In-jang	1.95 billion	Samyang Foods
30	Koo Kwang-mo	1.9 billion	LG
31	Lee Chae-yoon	1.89 billion	Leeno Industrial
32	Kim Nam-goo	1.85 billion	Korea Investment Holdings
33	Koo Bon-sik	1.8 billion	LT Group
34	Lee Jay-hyun	1.75 billion	CJ Group
35	Park Dong-suk	1.7 billion	Sanil Electric
36	Kim Sang-beom	1.5 billion	ISU Group
37	Suh Kyung-bae	1.45 billion	Amorepacific
38	Lee Hae-jin	1.44 billion	Naver
39	Lee Sang-hoon	1.4 billion	ABL Bio
40	Kim Hyun-tae	1.3 billion	Voronoi
41	Bang Si-hyuk	1.25 billion	Hybe Corporation
42	Chey Ki-won	1.21 billion	SK Group
43	Kim Hyoung-nyon	1.2 billion	Dunamu
44	Kim Taek-jin	1.18 billion	NCSoft
45	Lee Ho-jin	1.15 billion	Taekwang Group
46	Shin Dong-joo	1.13 billion	Lotte
47	Hong Seok-joh	1.1 billion	BGF Retail
48	Lee Su-jin	1.05 billion	Yanolja
49	Sung Kyu-dong	1.03 billion	EO Technics
50	Cho Hyun-beom	1 billion	Hankook & Company

== See also ==
- The World's Billionaires
- List of countries by the number of billionaires
