= Lee Ho-jin (businessman) =

South Korean billionaire (born 1962)

- 이호진
- Born: December 8, 1962 (age 63); Busan, South Korea
- Education: Seoul National University (BA); Cornell University (MBA); New York University (PhD)
- Occupation: Businessman
- Employer: Taekwang Group
- Father: Lee Im-yong

Korean name
- Hangul: 이호진
- Hanja: 李豪鎭
- RR: I Hojin
- MR: I Hojin

Lee Ho-jin (Korean: 이호진; born December 8, 1962) is a South Korean businessman. A former chairman of Taekwang Group and a son of its founder Lee Im-yong, he is among the richest people in South Korea. As of December 2024, Forbes estimates his net worth as US$1.4 billion and ranked him 20th richest in the country and 2,933th richest in the world.

In 2019, he was convicted of embezzling company funds and sentenced to three years in prison. He was released on parole in October 2021, and pardoned in August 2023. As of 2024, he is under investigation for creating a slush fund. He has also been engaged in a legal battle with his older sister over an inheritance dispute.

== Biography ==
Lee was born on December 8, 1962, in Busan, South Korea. He was born as the youngest son of three sons and three daughters, to father Lee Im-yong: the founder of Taekwang Industrial. He graduated from Daewon High School in 1981. He received a bachelor's in economics from Seoul National University in 1985. He received a Master of Business Administration degree from Cornell University in 1987, and a doctorate in business administration from New York University.

In 1997, at age 35, he became CEO of Taekwang Industrial and Daehan Synthetic Fiber upon the 1996 death of his father. He made attempts to diversify the business, expanding into broadcasting, information technology, and more. In January 2004, he became chairman of Taekwang Group upon the 2002 resignation of his uncle Lee Ki-hwa and 2003 death of his cousin Lee Sik-jin (이식진).

In 2011, he was convicted of embezzling ₩40 billion of company funds. In June 2012, he was released on medical parole due to his liver cancer diagnosis. By 2016, lawmakers called for his retrial. In 2018, he was arrested. In 2019, he was sentenced to three years in prison. He was released on parole in October 2021. He was pardoned in August 2023. He was again under investigation for creating a slush fund in 2024. He was arrested for this in September 2024, but not held in detention.

== Personal life ==
For over ten years, he has been in a legal battle with his sister Lee Jae-hun (이재훈) over inheritance from their father. His father's will stated that his assets should be given to only his wives and sons, excluding his daughters. Assets were given to Jae-hun at one point, and she refused to return them. The lawsuit was ongoing even by November 2024.

In 2011, he was diagnosed with stage 3 liver cancer, for which he had surgery to remove more than 35% of his liver. This occurred during his embezzlement investigation; during court hearings he appeared in a wheelchair.
