= Lee Su-jin (businessman) =

South Korean billionaire (born 1978)

- 이수진
- Born: February 1978 (age 47); Chungju, South Korea
- Education: Cheonan National Technical College
- Occupation: Businessman
- Employer: Yanolja

Korean name
- Hangul: 이수진
- RR: I Sujin
- MR: I Sujin

Lee Su-jin (Korean: 이수진; born February 1978) is a South Korean businessman. The founder and chairman of travel services company Yanolja, he is among the richest people in South Korea. In December 2024, Forbes estimated his net worth at US$1.5 billion and ranked him 22nd richest in the country.

== Biography ==
Lee was born in February 1978, in Chungju, South Korea. He became an orphan at a young age and was raised by his grandparents. According to an interview with Lee, he had difficulty reading and writing until his last year of elementary school. He graduated from Doowon Technical High School. He could not afford a regular university education; he received a scholarship to Cheonan National Technical College and graduated from there.

He worked in a small business but lost much of his money on the stock market. Afterwards, beginning in 2001 he worked for four and a half years in a love hotel. He initially worked as a janitor, but worked his way up to a management position. In 2004, he created a website for people working in the hospitality industry called "Motel Story" (모텔 이야기). On the website, he logged his thoughts about the industry. The site became popular and eventually had over 10,000 subscribers. In 2005, he acquired another website called "Motel Tour" (모텔투어), which had over 200,000 members and was the third largest site for the industry. This website eventually this developed into Yanolja, which was founded in either 2005 or 2007.

In 2007, Lee registered the domain "yanolja.com". In 2015, the business began focusing on mobile apps. Lee reportedly pursued an aggressive strategy of mergers and acquisitions. He acquired hotel reservation service Hotel Now (호텔나우) in 2016, and Leisure Q (레저큐) in 2016. In 2021, Yanolja received an investment of US$1.7 billion from SoftBank Vision Fund. In 2022, Yanolja acquired e-commerce company Interpark. By at latest 2024, Yanolja was the largest travel and leisure company in the country, and seeing record revenues and profits.

== Personal life ==
He is married to Park Jeong-hyeon (박정현), with whom he has two daughters. In 2024, he was the largest or second-largest shareholder of Yanolja (16.31% of total shares). His wife and two daughters each own 5.18% stake in the company. In 2024, he purchased a house in Seocho-dong in Seoul.
