= Lim Se-eun =

South Korean politician (born 1981)

- 임세은

Vice Presidential Spokesperson
- In office 2 September 2020 – 10 November 2021
- President: Moon Jae-in
- Preceded by: Yoon Jae-kwan
- Succeeded by: Shin Hye-hyeon

Personal details
- Born: 1981 (age 44–45)
- Party: Democratic
- Education: Ewha Womans University; SKKU

Lim Se-eun (Korean: 임세은; born 1981) is a South Korean politician served as the vice presidential spokesperson at the Blue House under President Moon Jae-in from 2020 to 2021.

Before promoted to the deputy spokesperson, Lim had served as a senior administrator for youth policy (Korean: 청년정책소통관) at the Office of Senior Presidential Secretary for Civil Society from April 2020.

Before entering politics in 2014, Lim worked at Hanwha Securities and Mirae Asset Daewoo for 12 years. From 2018 to 2020, Lim was the Non-executive director at IBK Securities.

Since 2014, she took various roles in Democratic Party of Korea - all related to either youth policy or nomination process - but never ran as a candidate.

Before becoming a government official in April 2020, Lim was active in civil societies as a member of Korea Economic Justice Institute at Citizens' Coalition for Economic Justice (Korean: 경제정의실천시민연합) from 2015 and co-founder and co-director of People's Livelihood Economy Institute (Korean: 민생경제연구소) from 2018.

Lim taught at Sungkonghoe University as an adjunct professor from 2017 to 2019.

Lim holds two degrees - a bachelor in economics from Ewha Womans University and Master of Business Administration from Sungkyunkwan University.
