= Naina (2005 film) =

- Theatrical release poster
- Directed by: Shripal Morakhia
- Screenplay by: Shripal Morakhia; Anjum Rajabali; Abhigyan Jha; Sagar Pandya
- Story by: Pang brothers
- Based on: The Eye by Pang brothers
- Produced by: Ashish Bhatnagar; Firuzi Khan
- Starring: Urmila Matondkar
- Cinematography: C. K. Muraleedharan
- Edited by: Amitabh Shukla; Sanjay Shukla
- Music by: Salim–Sulaiman
- Production company: iDream Productions
- Distributed by: SPE Films India
- Release date: 20 May 2005
- Running time: 103 minutes
- Country: India
- Language: Hindi
- Budget: ₹5 crore
- Box office: ₹6.94 crore

Naina is a 2005 Indian Hindi-language supernatural horror film directed by Shripal Morakhia starring Urmila Matondkar as the titular character who loses her sight as a child, regains it as an adult with corneal transplantation and starts seeing images beyond the general surroundings. The film is an unofficial remake of the 2002 Hong Kong-Singaporean horror film The Eye directed by the Pang brothers, with a subplot borrowed from the 2002 Japanese film Dark Water. (Note: Multiple reviewers have pointed out that the film is identical to The Eye while director Morakhia has completely denied this, making it an unofficial adaptation.)

The film was premiered in the Marché du Film section of the 2005 Cannes Film Festival. Released theatrically on 20 May 2005, Naina flopped at the box office, grossing ₹6.94 crore against a ₹5 crore budget. It was also seen as controversial due to its depiction of the protagonist seeing ghosts after receiving a corneal transplantation was similar to existing fears in India surrounding corneal transplants and it was feared the film would discourage people from donating corneas or seeking corneal transplants.

== Plot ==
During a solar eclipse in 1986, young Naina Shah, while traveling in the backseat of her England-based dad's car, is struck by glass from the shattered windshield during an accident and loses her eyesight. Her parents do not survive, and she is brought up by her paternal grandmother. Years later, Naina gets a successful corneal transplant and is able to see. She complains of vision problems, seeing hooded persons, and people dying, which a psychiatrist, Dr. Samir Patel, diagnoses as hallucinations. But when Naina reports seeing someone else in her mirror reflection, Samir decides to investigate who the original cornea actually belonged to. This investigation will lead them to an impoverished village in New Bhuj, Gujarat, where Naina will find her life endangered by hostile villagers who believe that the donor of her cornea was cursed.

Naina learns the story of her donor, Khemi. Khemi was born with the ability to see a person's imminent death and was ostracised by society. One night, she tried to save the village from a great fire, but nobody believed her. After the fire broke out, those same villagers blamed Khemi for the disaster. Khemi committed suicide out of despair. Naina returns to England, where she unsuccessfully tries to save people from fire. In the accident, Naina once again loses her eyesight, but she does not regret it because she has the love of Samir and her grandmother.

== Cast ==
- Urmila Matondkar as Naina Shah
- Anuj Sawhney as Dr. Samir Patel
- Malavika Nair as Khemi
- Amardeep Jha as Somabai
- Kamini Khanna as Mrs. Shah
- Sulabha Arya as Parvati Amma
- Morne Botes as Burn Victim
- Dinesh Lamba as Rathore
- Rahul Nath as Ghost blood rain car
- Anthony Rosato as Police Officer
- Tom Saville as Misc
- Pankaj Upadhyay as Victim

== Reception ==
=== Critical response ===
Taran Adarsh from Bollywood Hungama gave the film 3 stars out of 5, calling it "one of the most imaginative and pulse-pounding horror films to come along in recent times". On the other hand, Sukanya Verma from Rediff.com praised Matondkar's performance and the absence of songs, but felt the film failed to "establish an emotional connection" and instead went on a "melodrama spree" which ruined the fear factor.

=== Box office ===
The film was a commercial failure, earning ₹6.94 crore against a ₹5 crore budget.
