= Kim Jung-ju =

South Korean businessman (1968–2022)

- 김정주
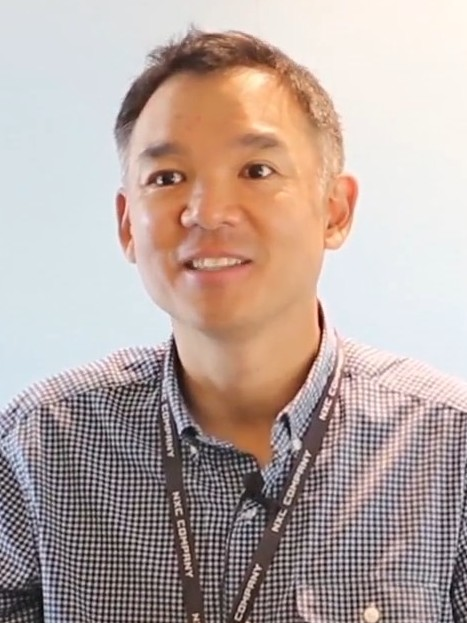
- Kim in 2016
- Born: 22 February 1968; Seoul, South Korea
- Died: 28 February 2022 (aged 54); Hawaii, United States
- Other names: Jay Kim, JJ
- Education: Seoul National University, KAIST, Korea National University of Arts
- Occupations: Businessman; investor
- Known for: Founding Nexon
- Title: CEO of NXC Corporation
- Spouse: Yoo Jung-hyun

Korean name
- Hangul: 김정주
- Hanja: 金正宙
- RR: Gim Jeongju
- MR: Kim Chŏngju
- IPA: [kimdʑʌŋdʑu]

Kim Jung-ju (Korean: 김정주; 22 February 1968 – 28 February 2022), also known as Jay Kim, was a South Korean businessman, investor, and founder of Korea's largest gaming company, Nexon. He was the chairman and CEO of NXC Corporation, the holding company of Nexon, and a partner at Collaborative Fund, a New York-based venture capital firm.

Kim died on 28 February 2022 at the age of 54, while travelling in Hawaii. At the time of his death, he was the third-wealthiest person in South Korea.

== Early life and education ==
Kim was born in Seoul on 22 February 1968. He held a B.S. in Computer Science and Engineering from Seoul National University and an M.S. in Electrical Engineering and Computer Science from Korea Advanced Institute of Science and Technology (KAIST), where he taught as adjunct professor in 2011. He also earned an MFA in Arts Management from Korea National University of Arts.

== Career ==
Kim founded Nexon in 1994, while pursuing a doctorate in computer science and engineering at KAIST. Under Kim's leadership, Nexon launched the world's first graphic massively multiplayer online role-playing game (MMORPG), Nexus: The Kingdom of the Winds and released popular titles such as MapleStory, KartRider, Mabinogi and Dungeon&Fighter. With offices in Korea, Japan, United States, Europe and Taiwan, Nexon services over 100 online and mobile games to over 190 countries. In 2005, the company moved its headquarters from Seoul, South Korea to Tokyo, Japan and went public on the Tokyo Stock Exchange in 2011. Nexon is valued at over US$13 billion as of March 2019.

In 2009, Kim consolidated his and his family's majority holding of Nexon by establishing NXC Corporation, where he served as CEO until July 2021. He is known for acquiring firms and investing in various fields. Being an avid Lego fan, he purchased Bricklink in 2013, an online marketplace for Lego toys. The website was sold to The Lego Group in 2019. In 2014, NXC acquired Stokke, a premium children's furniture manufacturer and later purchased JetKids to join Stokke in 2018. Other acquisitions include Korbit in 2017 and Bitstamp in 2018, both major cryptocurrency exchanges based in South Korea and Europe, respectively. Some of his investments through NXC include SmartStudy, SendBird and OnDemandKorea. In 2019, according to media reports, it was announced that Kim was preparing to sell his controlling stake in NXC Corp for an estimated $9 billion (USD).

In 2014, Kim joined Collaborative Fund as a partner. At the time, Collaborative's founder and managing partner Craig Shapiro welcomed Kim as a "bootstrap" business expert at the firm, as he had built Nexon into a multi-billion dollar business without taking any venture capital investment. Among other contributions, Kim was interested in helping startups expand their businesses outside the US, stating that localization efforts from an early stage can help brands reach a more global audience.

In 2016, Kim was charged with suspicious stock transactions and bribery after giving South Korean prosecutor Jin Kyung-joon more than 920 million South Korean won (US$790,000). According to prosecutors, Kim had given Jin ₩420 million (US$313,368) to purchase unlisted Nexon Korea stock in 2005, which Jin then sold for US$880,000 in the following year. Prosecutors also alleged Jin received ₩50 million (US$37,306) from Kim for overseas trips. The scandal prompted Kim to issue an apology and resign from Nexon's board of directors in July 2016.

== Philanthropy ==
Kim's philanthropic endeavors largely support next generation youth, especially in the areas of technology, health and education. In 2013, he established Asia's first computer museum, Nexon Computer Museum on Jeju Island in South Korea. He collected valuable computer and gaming collectibles for ten years with the goal of opening such a museum dedicated to the history of technology.

In 2016, NXC, in conjunction with Nexon and Neople, contributed over US$18 million towards the establishment of Korea's first pediatric rehabilitation hospital, Purme Foundation Nexon Children's Rehabilitation Hospital in Seoul, South Korea. In 2018, Kim established the Nexon Foundation, which continues Nexon's corporate social responsibility activities dedicated to children, and he pledged to donate an additional US$93 million from personal wealth to fund startups and build more children's hospitals. In February 2019, the foundation announced its donation of US$9 million in support of a second children's rehabilitation hospital to be built in Daejeon, South Korea. The Daejeon Chungnam Nexon Children's Rehabilitation Hospital, which is expected to complete by September 2022, will be the first public children's rehabilitation hospital in Korea. In October 2020, the foundation announced its donation of ₩10 billion (US$8,500,000) to Seoul National University Hospital (SNUH) to fund the establishment of the Nexon Children's Palliative Care Center, which is set to open in 2022. Kim was recognized in Forbes' Asia's 2021 Heroes of Philanthropy list for his donations to the two children's hospitals.

In addition, Nexon Foundation runs the Nexon Youth Programming Challenge, an annual computer programming event, and the Nexon Small Library project, a network of 130 public libraries created for children in underserved communities. In partnership with Nexon Foundation, Kim founded SOHO Impact, a US-based non-profit organization promoting creativity in kids through brick play programs. He was also a founding board member of C-Program, a venture philanthropy fund jointly established by the founders of Nexon, Naver, Kakao, Daum and NCSoft.

== Recognition ==
Kim was a key figure behind South Korea's first-generation tech wave, launching Nexon in 1994 as a game-developing startup and pioneering the freemium gaming business model. In 2010, he was selected as one of Korea's Top 100 Leaders in Technology. In 2012, he received the Presidential Award, Tin Tower Order of Industrial Service Merit for his contributions as a distinguished entrepreneur in South Korea.

In 2013, Forbes ranked Kim as South Korea's 11th richest person, with an estimated net worth of US$1.6 billion. By the end of 2018, he was ranked 5th, with a net worth estimated at US$7.1 billion. At the time of his death at the end of February 2022, he was the third richest person in the country, with an estimated net worth of US$10.7 billion.

== Personal life and death ==
Kim was married to Yoo Jung-hyun, and together they had two daughters. He died on 28 February 2022, aged 54, while travelling in Hawaii. According to Nexon holding company NXC, which announced Kim's death on 1 March, he had been receiving treatment for depression, which "seemed to have worsened recently". Out of respect for Kim's family, the exact cause of death was not disclosed.
