= Lee Ho-jin =

Lee Ho-jin (Korean: 이호진) may refer to:

- Lee Ho-jin (businessman) (born 1962), South Korean businessman and former chairman of Taekwang Group
- Lee Ho-jin (footballer) (born 1983), South Korean footballer
