= Yoo Jung-hyun =

Yoo Jung-hyun may refer to:

- Yoo Jung-hyun (businesswoman), South Korean billionaire and ex-wife of Nexon founder Kim Jung-ju
- Yoo Jung-hyun (politician), South Korean politician and entertainer
