= Global X Investments Canada Inc. =

Canadian financial services company

- Industry: Investment management
- Founded: 2005; 21 years ago
- Headquarters: Toronto, Ontario, Canada
- Key people: Rohit Mehta (President and CEO)
- Products: Exchange-traded funds
- Website: globalx.ca

Global X Investments Canada Inc. (formerly Horizons ETFs) is a financial services company that offers exchange-traded funds. On May 1, 2024, the company changed its name from Horizons ETFs to Global X Investments Canada Inc. In April 2017, Global X began offering the first cannabis industry focused exchange-traded fund (ETF), Global X Marijuana Life Sciences Index ETF. The company is also the fourth-largest ETF provider in Canada, with more than CAD$30 billion in assets as of April 2023.

== History ==
Founded in 2005, Global X was formerly known as Horizons ETFs. Prior to that, the company was known as BetaPro Management Inc., a subsidiary of Jovian Capital Corp, which traded in direct-commodities linked ETFs, leveraged ETFs, and inverse ETFs. In January 2006, the company under the brand Horizons BetaPro began offering two funds which tracked the S&P and Toronto Stock Exchange (TSX): S&P/TSX 60 Bull Plus Fund and the S&P/TSX 60 Bear Plus Fund. In 2011, Jovian Capital sold BetaPro Management and its subsidiary AlphaPro Management to Mirae Asset Global Investments, based in Seoul, South Korea.

In 2017, Global X launched the Horizons Marijuana Life Sciences Index ETF (HMMJ), the first marijuana-related exchange-traded fund, focused on a collection of publicly traded companies in North America. HMMJ was listed on the Toronto Stock Exchange on April 5, 2017. By September 2018, HMMJ's assets reached CAD$1 billion. Despite significant losses at the end of September and the last two weeks of October, HMMJ returned a 60% gain in 2018. Horizons ETFs was also a sponsor of the Toronto Raptors NBA team during its 2017–18 season. In August 2017, Scotiabank purchased the naming rights to the home arena of the Toronto Maple Leafs and Raptors and exercised a veto in its deal on competing institutions, ending Horizons' sponsorship of the Raptors before the 2018–19 NBA season.

On February 14, 2018, Horizons began offering Horizons Junior Marijuana Growers Index ETF, traded as HMJR on the NEO Exchange. HMJR is exposed to smaller marijuana companies involved in cultivation, production and distribution. On June 21, 2018, it also began trading Horizons Blockchain Technology & Hardware Index ETF. Horizons were also represented among the companies in the cannabis industry that gathered to ring the opening bell of the Toronto Stock Exchange on October 17, 2018, the day Canada legalized recreational use of marijuana. In November 2018, the firm began offering Horizons Active A.I. Global Equity ETF, which makes investment decisions governed by artificial intelligence.

In April 2019, Horizons ETFs launched the Horizons US Marijuana Index ETF, an index ETF focused on the U.S. cannabis marketplace. This was followed the next month with BetaPro Marijuana Companies 2x Daily Bull ETF and BetaPro Marijuana Companies Inverse ETF, respectively the first leveraged and the first inverse cannabis ETFs.

In April 2023, Rohit Mehta was named the new President and CEO of Global X.
