= Hyosung TNC =

South Korean textile and trading company

Hyosung TNC Corporation
- Native name: 효성티앤씨
- Type: Public
- ISIN: KRX: 298020
- Industry: Textiles, Trading, etc.
- Founded: 1957 as Hyosung Trading Company
- Founder: Cho Hong-jai, former Chairman of Hyosung Group
- Headquarters: 119 Mapo-daero, Mapo-gu, Seoul, South Korea
- Key people: Kim Chi-hyung (CEO)
- Products: Chemical fibers, industrial materials, textiles, resin manufacturing, retail/wholesale, cafeteria and café operations
- Services: Chemical Fiber Manufacturing Synthetic Fiber Manufacturing; Textile Dyeing; Textile Finishing and Processing Special Yarn and Cord Fabric Manufacturing; General Merchandise Wholesale Textile Wholesale
- Revenue: 7.5269 trillion KRW (as of 2023)
- Operating income: 213.4 billion KRW (as of 2023)
- Number of employees: 1,389 (as of December 31, 2023)
- Parent: Hyosung Group
- Subsidiaries: Some Sevit, Gwangju Refrigerated Warehouse
- Website: Website

Hyosung TNC Corporation (Korean: 효성티앤씨, 曉星-) is a South Korean textile manufacturing and trading company specializing in textiles and international trade. The company produces textile materials through its spandex brand CREORA™ and sustainable fiber brand regen™. Additionally, Hyosung TNC operates Some Sevit, a floating cultural complex in Seoul, and provides logistics management services through the Gwangju Refrigerated Warehouse.

== History ==
=== Founding and Early Years (1957–1969) ===
Hyosung TNC Corporation was originally established as Hyosung Trading Company in 1957 by Cho Hong-jai. In 1962, the company relocated its headquarters to 112 Sogong-dong, Jung-gu, Seoul. Two years later, it partnered with Korea Nylon and Hanil Nylon to form Tongyang Caprolactam Co., Ltd., The establishment of Tongyang Nylon Co., Ltd. followed in 1966, along with the completion of its Ulsan Plant. In 1968, Tongyang Nylon introduced its first yarn product under the Toplon brand.

=== Expansion and Mergers (1970–1989) ===
The company expanded significantly in the 1970s, beginning with the merger of Tongyang Nylon and Hanil Nylon in 1970. In 1973, Toplon Co., Ltd., Tongyang Polyester Co., Ltd., and Tongyang Dyeing Co., Ltd. were established.

In 1977, Hyosung Trading was listed on the stock exchange and relocated to Hyosung Building II in Seosomun-dong, Jung-gu, Seoul.

In 1979, Toplon Co., Ltd. completed its Eonyang Plant, and Hyosung Trading moved its headquarters to Dongsung Building in Namdaemun-ro, Jung-gu, Seoul. The same year, the company entered the marine industry with the launch of its first yacht at the Incheon yacht plant. In 1982, Tongyang Nylon established the Tongyang Nylon Technical Research Institute and completed a Titania plant at its Anyang factory. In 1983, Toplon Co., Ltd. merged with Tongyang Nylon, and the company restructured its textile business division in 1984. A key milestone was achieved in 1987 with the localization of Nylon-66 resin production and the commencement of mass production.

=== Corporate Restructuring and Fiber Advancement (1990–2010) ===
In 1990, Hyosung entered the spandex business, laying the foundation for what would become a core product line under the Creora brand. By 1997, the company commercialized spandex production. A year later, in 1998, Hyosung developed the first nylon filament yarn.That same year, Hyosung Corporation was formed through the merger of Hyosung T&C, Hyosung Trading, and Hyosung Heavy Industries.

In 2007, the company introduced MIPAN Regen, a recycled nylon yarn brand.

=== Recent Developments (2011–Present) ===
In 2011, Hyosung TNC opened Some Sevit, the world’s largest man-made floating island on the HanRiver. A major restructuring occurred in 2018, leading to the spin-off of Hyosung TNC from Hyosung Corporation. In 2019, the company established the Production Technology Center to enhance its research and development capabilities.

In 2022, Hyosung TNC commercialized the world’s first bio-based spandex (regen Bio-Based). The following year, the company underwent a brand renewal, introducing integrated fiber brands under CREORA™ and regen™.

== Business Activity & Products ==
=== Fiber Brands ===
==== Creora ====
Creora is Hyosung TNC’s fiber brand introduced in 1992, initially focused on spandex production. It has since developed into an integrated product line encompassing spandex, functional nylon, and polyester fibers. Currently, Creora holds a leading global market share in the spandex industry.

Product categories include:

- Spandex: 3D Max, Black, Color+, EasyFlex, Eco-Soft, Fresh, Highclo, PowerFit
- Nylon: Aua-X, Coolwave, Fine & Soft, Fit, Rexy, Robic, Robic-Air
- Polyester: Aerocool, Aerogear, Aeroheat, Aerolight, Aerosilver, Aerowarm, Askin, Cotna, Firex, Freshgear, M2, Prizma

==== Regen ====
Regen is Hyosung TNC’s fiber brand, developed to address environmental considerations in the textile industry. In 2007, the company produced nylon yarn using discarded fishing nets as raw material, and in 2008, it developed Korea’s first polyester fiber made from recycled PET bottles. The brand also includes bio-based products derived from renewable resources.

Product categories include:

- Recycled fibers:
  - Spandex: Regen Spandex
  - Nylon: Regen Aua-X, Regen Robic
  - Polyester: Regen Askin, Aerocool, Cotna, Aerowarm, Freshgear, Xanadu, Aerosilver, Aerolight, Aeroheat
- Regen Ocean: Ocean-based nylon and polyester fibers
- Bio-based fibers: Regen Bio BDO, Regen Bio Spandex

=== Trading Business Division ===
Hyosung TNC operates a global trading business in sectors including steel, chemicals, and synthetic materials.

=== Other Activities ===
==== Some Sevit ====
Hyosung TNC operates Some Sevit, a floating cultural complex on the Han River in Seoul. It comprises three interconnected islands: Gavit, Chaevit, and Solvit and a waterfront stage known as Yevit. The complex hosts food and beverage outlets, exhibition spaces, and leisure facilities.
