= Kwak Dong Shin =

South Korean billionaire (born 1974)

- 곽동신
- Born: December 17, 1974 (age 51); Seoul, South Korea
- Occupation: Chairman of Hanmi Semiconductor

Korean name
- Hangul: 곽동신
- RR: Gwak Dongsin
- MR: Kwak Tongsin

Kwak Dong Shin (Korean: 곽동신; born December 17, 1974) is a South Korean businessman and chairman of Hanmi Semiconductor. He is among the richest people in South Korea, with Forbes estimating his net worth in December 2024 to be US$2.2 billion and ranking him the 8th richest person in the country.

== Biography ==
Kwak Dong Shin was born on December 17, 1974, in Seoul, South Korea as the eldest son of father Kwak No-gweon (곽노권). The elder Kwak would found Hanmi Semiconductor in 1980.

In 1998, he joined Hanmi Semiconductor and worked in a variety of management roles. He served as CEO of Hanmi Motors, a car importer established by Hanmi Semiconductor. He also served as CEO of Shinho Motors (신호모터스), a BMW dealer affiliated with Hanmi Semiconductor, and Hanmi Networks (한미네트웍스), a cosmetics sales company. He owned a 12.6% stake in Hanmi Semiconductor until 2008, when he became the largest shareholder after a stock donation from his father. He worked as vice chairman of Hanmi Semiconductor from 2007 until December 2024, after which he became chairman. This followed the death of his father, who died in 2023.

He has two sons: Kwak Ho-seong (곽호성; born 2002) and Kwak Ho-jung (곽호중; born 2007). In 2024, he donated 1% each of the total company stocks of Hanmi Semiconductor to his two sons.
