= Bom Kim =

American businessman (born 1978)

- 김범석
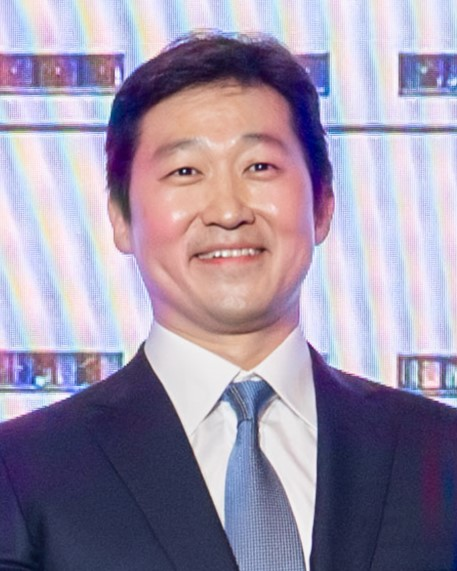
- Born: 7 October 1978 (age 48); Seoul, South Korea
- Education: Harvard University (BA)
- Title: Founder & CEO of Coupang
- Children: 1

Korean name
- Hangul: 김범석
- RR: Gim Beomseok
- MR: Kim Pŏmsŏk

Kim Beomseok (Korean: 김범석; born 7 October 1978), known professionally in the West as Bom Kim, is an American businessman of South Korean origin, who is the founder and chief executive officer (CEO) of Coupang Inc. In 2018, when SoftBank Vision Fund invested US$2 billion in Coupang, valuing the company at US$9 billion, Kim became the second-youngest billionaire in South Korea at the age of 40. As of November 2024, Kim has an estimated net worth of US$4.3 billion.

== Early life ==
Kim was born in Seoul, South Korea, on 7 October 1978. At age 7, he and his family moved to the United States. He went to Deerfield Academy, a boarding school in Massachusetts, where he was on the varsity wrestling and track teams. He graduated from Harvard College with a bachelor's degree, and attended Harvard Business School, dropping out in his second semester.

Kim interned at The New Republic, started a student magazine, Current, and worked briefly at Boston Consulting Group prior to founding the magazine 02138, named for Harvard's ZIP Code. He raised US$4 million to fund 02138 and started Coupang after it folded.

== Coupang ==
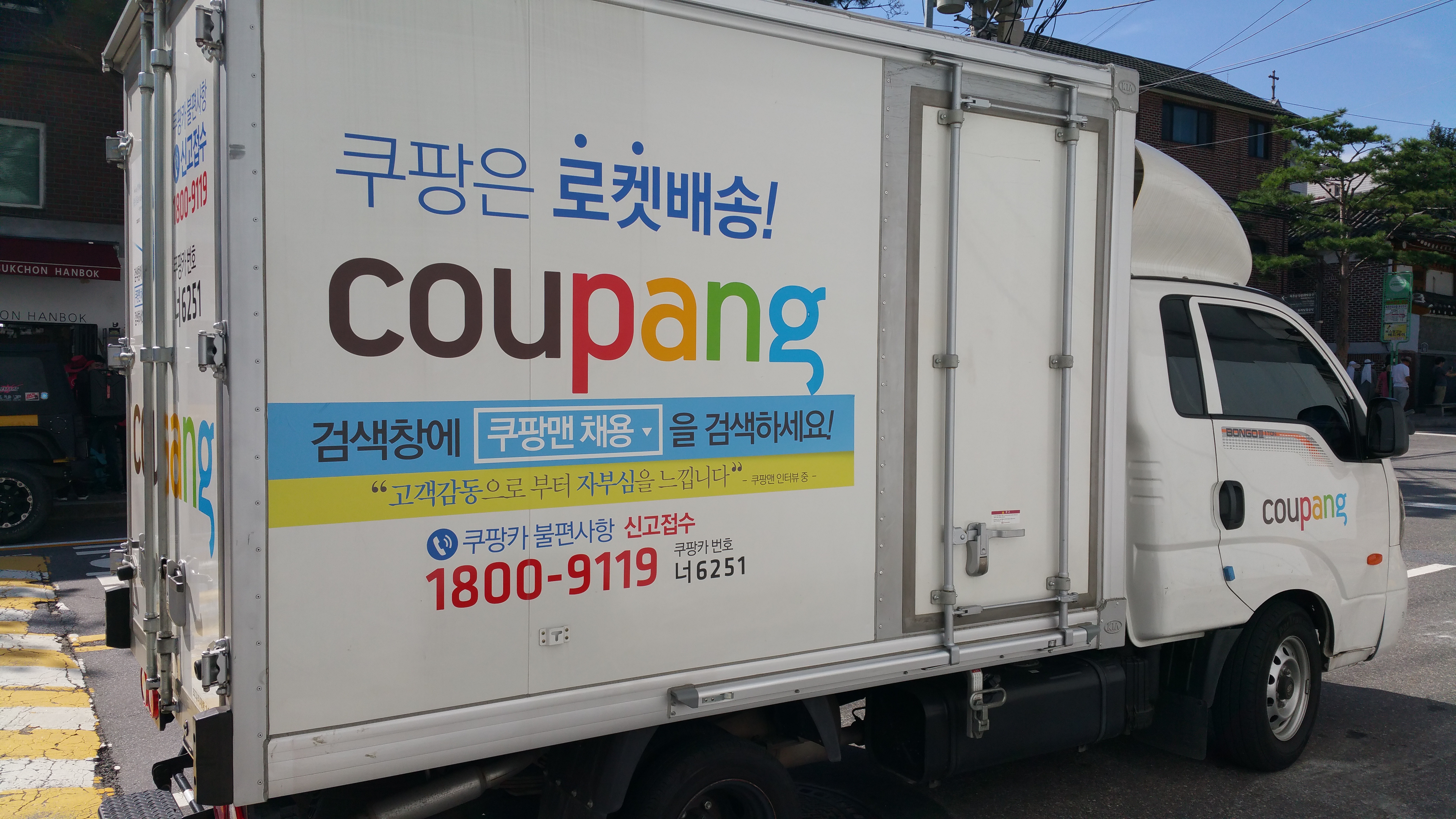
Coupang delivery truck in Seoul, 2017.

Kim founded Coupang in 2010 and has since gone on to raise more than US$3.8 billion in venture capital from investors including Sequoia Capital, Softbank, and BlackRock.

It began as a Groupon-like website and now operates as an online retailer with a logistics service called Rocket Delivery. It was reported in 2018 that Coupang would gross KRW2.7 trillion in annual sales and lost KRW1.7 trillion between 2015 and 2017, and maintains over 3.5 million daily active users as of 2019.

The company employs over 40,000 people with offices in Seoul, Taipei, Singapore, Shanghai, Beijing, Tokyo, Seattle, Silicon Valley, and many more.

== Legals issues ==
Kim faced legal scrutiny in 2026 in Korea, and calls for leniency from the US government.

== Personal life ==
Kim is married, has one child, and lives in Seoul.
