= Shripal Morakhia =

Indian film director and producer

- Occupations: Filmmaker, film producer, businessman
- Years active: 1990–present

Shripal Morakhia (Marathi: श्रीपाल मोराखिया) is an Indian businessman, film director and film producer. Morakhia is best known for his 2005 directorial debut Naina. Presently, Morakhia is chairman of Smaaash a sports entertainment venture with his equity partner and former cricketer Sachin Tendulkar.

== Early life ==
Morakhia was a stock broker and executive assistant to President of New York Stock Exchange. Thereafter, Morakhia also opened an investment bank outfit SSKI and online portal Sharekhan.

== Venture in sports entertainment ==
Morakhia founded entertainment centre Smaaash in 2012 which holds the equity of 1.5 billion rupees after the investment by FW Sports Investment Fund (FSIF). The venture is co-operated by STAR India.

== Venture into film industry ==
Morakhia also launched his film production and film distribution company named iDream Productions in early 2000 and distributed many films. Morakhia holds 50% stake of the production house.

== Controversy over Naina ==
Morakhia's directorial venture Naina faced oppositions by public and ophthalmologists from India, stated that film will discourage eye donors to donate eyes. Morakhia defended the film, saying that Naina would not discourage any medical institution.

== Filmography ==
- Naina (2005)
