= 02138 =

Magazine for Harvard alumni 2006–2008

02138 was an independent magazine founded in 2006 by Bom Kim and Daniel Loss, later purchased by Atlantic Media (David Bradley); it featured graduates of Harvard University. The publication was, however, not actually affiliated with Harvard. The title refers to the ZIP code of Harvard University's main campus in Harvard Square, Cambridge, Massachusetts.

The owners sold the magazine to the New York City publisher Manhattan Media in May 2008; in October, 2008, 02138 ceased publication.
