= Suh Kyung-bae =

South Korean businessman (born 1963)

- Born: January 14, 1963 (age 63)
- Education: Yonsei University; Samuel Curtis Johnson Graduate School of Management at Cornell University
- Occupations: Chairman, AmorePacific
- Children: 2

Korean name
- Hangul: 서경배
- Hanja: 徐慶培
- RR: Seo Gyeongbae
- MR: Sŏ Kyŏngbae

Suh Kyung-bae (Korean: 서경배; born January 14, 1963) is a South Korean billionaire businessman. He is the chairman and CEO of Amorepacific Corporation, a Korean cosmetics company founded by his father Suh Sung-whan in 1945.

He is among the richest people in South Korea, with Forbes in December 2024 estimating his net worth at US$1.1 billion and ranking him 21st richest in the country.

== Early life ==
Suh Kyung-bae was born in South Korea in 1963. He received a bachelor's degree in business administration from Yonsei University and an MBA from Samuel Curtis Johnson Graduate School of Management at Cornell University.

== Career ==
In 1997, Suh inherited the company from his father and guided the company's global expansion. According to Forbes, Amorepacific became one of the world's 100 most innovative companies.

In 2006, Suh received the Légion d'honneur from the French government. In 2015, he was selected as "Businessman of the Year" by Forbes Asia Magazine and in 2017, was ranked world's 20th, Asia's 2nd best-performing CEO by Harvard Business Review and INSEAD Business School.

Suh is married, with two children, and lives in Seoul.

== Non-profit work ==
In 2016, Suh established Suh Kyung-bae Foundation. Since 2017, the foundation has awarded 14 scientists grants of between 1.5 billion and 2.5 billion won.
