= Mirae Asset Financial Group =

Financial services group

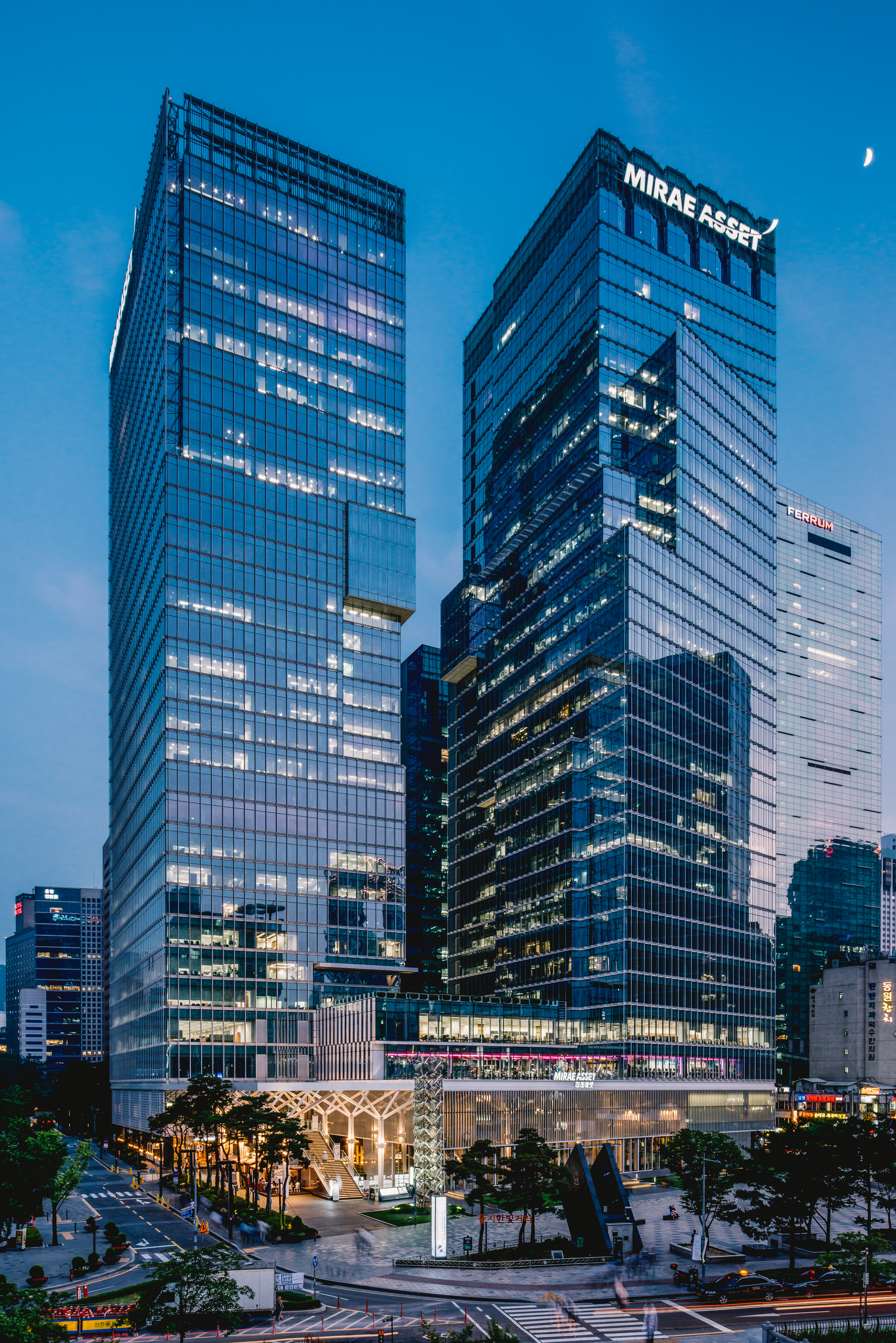
- Type: Private
- Industry: Financial services
- Founded: 1997; 29 years ago
- Founder: Park Hyeon-Joo
- Headquarters: Seoul, South Korea
- Products: Asset management; Investment management; Wealth management; Investment banking; Life insurance
- AUM: ▲US$729.5 billion (2025)
- Number of employees: 15,997 (2025)
- Website: www.miraeasset.com

Mirae Asset Financial Group (Korean: 미래에셋금융그룹) is a South Korean multinational financial services company headquartered in Seoul, South Korea. Mirae Asset provides comprehensive financial services including asset management, wealth management, investment banking, and life insurance. Mirae Asset was founded by Hyeon Joo Park in 1997 and introduced the first mutual funds to Korean retail investors in 1998. On a global consolidated basis, the total group's client assets exceed US$550 billion (as of December 2020). Mirae Asset has a global presence in Australia, Brazil, Canada, Mainland China, Hong Kong, Colombia, India, Indonesia, Japan, Korea, Mongolia, Singapore, the United Kingdom, the United States, and Vietnam.

Harvard Business School selected Mirae Asset Financial Group as its first Asian financial company case study in 2010, under the title "Mirae Asset: Korea's Mutual Fund Pioneer". Seoul National University also selected Mirae Asset Financial Group as one of their case studies, "Mirae Asset: A Disruptive Innovator in the Korean Financial Industry", which is listed by The Case Centre case method clearinghouse.

== History ==
=== Foundation of Mirae Asset Financial Group ===
Park Hyeon-Joo founded Mirae Asset Global Investments and Mirae Asset Capital in June 1997. In December 1998, Park launched the first retail mutual fund, "Park Hyeon Joo No.1" in South Korea and The Journal of Investment & Pension described that this fund was a great success.

=== Mergers and acquisitions of Mirae Asset Financial Group ===
Mirae Asset Financial Group has grown into an independent financial conglomerate in South Korea by acquiring various financial companies:

- 2004.02 Acquired SK Investment Trust Company, an affiliate of SK Group
- 2005.06 Acquired SK Life Insurance, an affiliate of SK Group
- 2011.11 Acquired Horizons ETFs, a major ETF player in Canada
- 2011.11 Acquired Betashares, a major ETF player in Australia
- 2016.12 Merge and acquisition of Daewoo Securities and Mirae Asset Securities
- 2016.12 Acquired KDB asset management company, formerly owned by Korea Development Bank
- 2017.07 Invested Vietnamese life insurance company, PRÉVOIR
- 2017.12 Acquired Korea-based PCA Life Insurance
- 2018.07 Acquired Global X, US ETF company
- 2022.06 Acquired ETF Securities Australia, an Australian ETF company
- 2024.11 Acquired Sharekhan Indian Brokerage company

=== Global expansion and presence of Mirae Asset Financial Group ===
Founder Park led the company's expansion into international markets during its early years.

== Key affiliates ==
=== Mirae Asset Global Investments ===
Mirae Asset Global Investments is a leading asset management company in South Korea. Its subsidiaries include Global X ETFs and Global X Investments Canada.

=== Mirae Asset Securities ===
Mirae Asset Securities offers brokerage services, wealth management, investment banking, and sales and trading services. It is listed on KOSPI.

=== Mirae Asset Life Insurance ===
Mirae Asset Life Insurance offers life insurance, investment-linked insurance, financial consulting, and retirement planning services. It has been listed on KOSPI since July 2015.

=== Mirae Asset Venture Investment ===
Mirae Asset Venture Investment Co., Ltd. is a venture capital and private equity company specializing in investing in venture businesses with potential growth, incubation, buyouts, and cross-border investments. It has been listed on KOSDAQ since March 2019.

== See also ==
- Economy of South Korea
