= Hyosung Heavy Industries =

South Korean industrial company

Hyosung Heavy Industries Corporation
- Native name: 효성중공업
- Type: Public
- Industry: Heavy Industries
- Founded: 1962 as HanYoung Industrial Co., Ltd.
- Founder: Cho Hong-jai, former Chairman of Hyosung Group
- Headquarters: 119 Mapo-daero, Mapo-gu, Seoul, South Korea
- Key people: Woo Tae-hee (CEO)
- Services: Power Solutions Electrical & Mechanical Solutions; Sustainable Solutions Construction and Others
- Revenue: 4.3 trillion KRW (as of 2024)
- Operating income: 257.8 billion KRW (as of 2024)
- Number of employees: 3,291 (as of 2024)
- Parent: Hyosung Group
- Subsidiaries: ChinHung International, Inc. Hyosung Goodsprings Ｇongdeok Ｇyeongwoo Ｄevelopment Wind Power Business Division and others
- Website: https://www.hyosungheavyindustries.com/en

Hyosung Heavy Industries Corporation (Korean: 효성중공업, 曉星重工業) is a South Korean heavy industries company specializing in power transmission and distribution solutions, transformers, construction and renewable energy. It is a subsidiary of Hyosung Group.

In 2024, the company reported a revenue of 4.3 trillion KRW. Its operating income stood at 257.8 billion KRW, while the total number of employees was 3,291.

== History ==
Hyosung Heavy Industries was originally established in 1962 as HanYoung Industrial Co., Ltd. In 1969, it developed Korea's first 154kV extra-high-voltage transformer. The company was renamed as Hyosung Heavy Industries Corporation in 1977. Throughout the 1980s and 1990s, the company expanded its operations in power solutions and circuit breakers. In 2018, it was spun off from the Hyosung Corporation as an independent entity. Since 2019, the company has invested heavily in hydrogen energy and digital solutions to enhance its technological capabilities.

In 2020, Hyosung Heavy Industries signed a memorandum of understanding with Linde Group to cooperate on liquid hydrogen production, storage, and distribution. In 2024, the company announced the commercialization of a 100% hydrogen engine generator.

The company's headquarters is located in Seoul, South Korea. It also operates manufacturing plants in Changwon, South Korea. Additionally, the company has a global presence with locations in China, India, Vietnam and the United States.

== Business Areas ==
=== Power Solutions ===
Hyosung Heavy Industries has the highest cumulative market share in Korea's power transmission and distribution sector. The company produces power equipment including extra-high voltage transformers, extra-high voltage circuit breakers, and electrical components, while providing engineering, design, manufacturing, installation, testing, and maintenance services for power equipment.

Major products include power equipment (extra-high voltage transformers, distribution transformers, shunt reactors, extra-high voltage circuit breakers, switchgears, mobile substations), power systems (STATCOM, DC transmission and distribution systems, ESS, microgrids, solar power solutions), digital solutions (power equipment asset management solutions, preventive diagnostic systems), and welding solutions (arc welders, resistance welders).

In 2024, the company completed development of a 200MW ultra-high-voltage direct current (HVDC) transformer. The HVDC transformer manufacturing plant is scheduled to be built in Changwon, South Gyeongsang Province, and is scheduled for completion in 2027.

=== Electrical & Mechanical Solutions ===
The company produces a range of motors from low-voltage small and medium-sized motors to high-voltage ultra-large motors, super-premium efficiency motors, BLDC motors, and Q-Class motors for nuclear power plants. In the generator sector, the company manufactures and exports power generation systems for ships, steam turbines, and water turbines, as well as MG-Sets for fuel rod control to overseas nuclear power plants. Major products include motors & generators (high-voltage motors, low-voltage motors, DC motors, special motors, commercial generators), industrial machinery systems (chemical equipment, gas charging stations), and gear solutions (gearboxes, geared motors).

=== Sustainable Solutions ===
The company provides sustainable power equipment, power grid stabilization solutions, hydrogen energy, renewable energy, and digital solutions.

=== Construction ===
Through ChinHung International, Inc., established in 1959, the company conducts building construction, SOC projects, and housing development. The company constructs residential buildings under the 'Hyosung Harrington Place' brand.

== Subsidiaries ==
=== Hyosung HICO ===
In 2019, Hyosung Heavy Industries announced that it was buying Mitsubishi Electric's transformer factory in Memphis, Tennessee. It became the only manufacturer of 765kV transformers in the United States at the time. By 2026, Hyosung had supplied almost half of the 765-kV transformers being used in the US grid. The subsidiary's partners included Intersect Power, an energy infrastructure provider which was fully acquired by Alphabet Inc. in 2025.

==== Other Subsidiaries ====
- Chinhung International, Inc.
- Gongdeok Gyeongwoo Development
- Hyosung Goodsprings
