= Global X ETFs =

American investment company

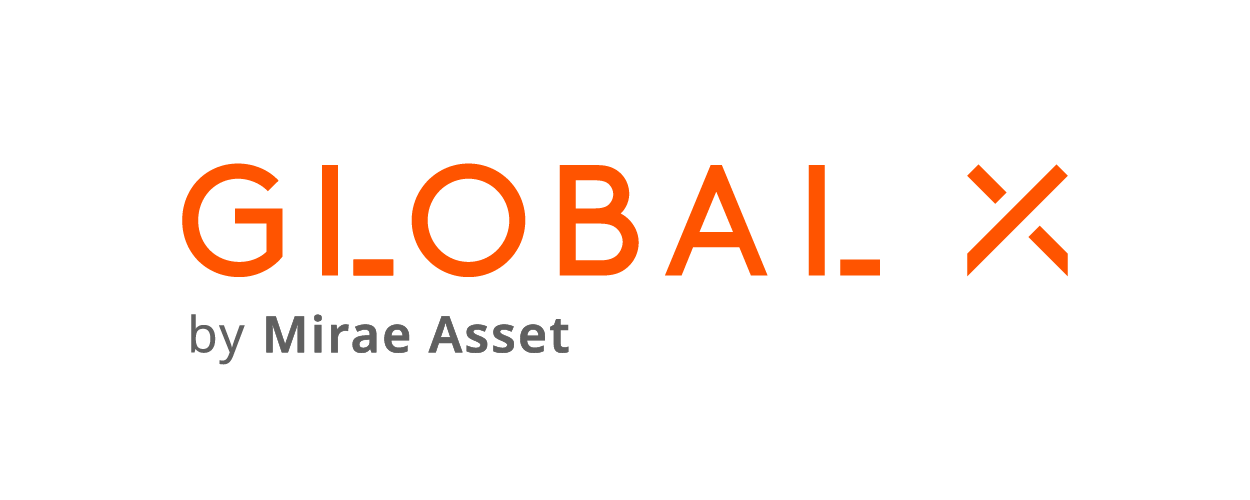
- Type: Subsidiary
- Industry: Investment management
- Founded: 2008; 18 years ago, in New York, NY, U.S.
- Headquarters: New York, NY, U.S.
- Products: Exchange-traded funds (ETFs)
- AUM: ~$125 billion (January 2025)
- Parent: Mirae Asset Financial Group
- Website: www.globalxetfs.com

Global X ETFs is a New York-based provider of exchange-traded funds that facilitates access to investment opportunities across the global markets. Founded in 2008, it has approximately $40 billion in managed assets, across more than 80 different products. The ETF issuer and manager is widely known for its Thematic Growth, Income and International product suites, in addition to its Core, Commodities and Alpha strategies. In July 2018, the company was acquired by Mirae Asset Global Investments.

== History ==
The company was founded in 2008. After Global X was established in 2008 it brought to market its first ETF in February 2009. The firm focused on previously unexplored ETF strategies in the subsequent years, launching a range of first-to-market single-country ETFs and commodity funds. In 2011, the firm introduced its first global dividend product, a strategy which it has subsequently adapted to U.S. equities, preferreds, REITs, emerging markets, alternatives, and most recently, EAFE equities.

Global X was also an early proponent of thematic investing, launching its first thematic ETF in 2010, targeting companies that offered exposure to the lithium cycle. The firm has since launched a range of additional strategies providing access to emerging themes in areas of technology, people and demographics, and U.S. infrastructure.

Global X was acquired by Mirae Asset Global Investments in July 2018 for $488 million.

In September 2019, Global X Management Company joined with Daiwa Securities Group to create Global X Japan (GXJ). It maintains the Global Leaders ETF, a Hong Kong exchange-traded fund.

Global X launched its Global X Uranium UCITS ETF on the LSE and Deutsche Börse Xetra in 2022. Global X in August 2023 filed to launch an ETF alternating between allocating to Bitcoin futures and the firm's Treasury bill ETF. Global X in November 2023 also launched an ETF option for volatile emerging markets. Global X filed its application to become one of the first companies to offer a Spot Bitcoin ETF in the US on August 23, 2023. In its first year of operation, the Global X Blockchain ETF dropped 76.7 percent, dropping from a peak of $125 million of assets.

In November 2023, Global X ETFs replaced its CEO with an interim executive, when Luis Berruga announced he was stepping down after a decade with the company to spend time with family. Thomas Park, co-CEO of Mirae and a board member of Global X, was announced as his replacement while the company searched for a permanent CEO. In February 2024, Mirae Asset Global Investments announced that Ryan O'Connor had been appointed CEO, effective April 8.

In late 2023 the company was still owned by Mirae Asset Global Investments, and managed US$39 billion.

== Research and insights ==
In early 2016, the firm began expanding the scope of its published research, which spans the emergence of disruptive technologies, to the impact of geopolitics on developing economies, and the drivers impacting income-oriented investments.
