= Song Chi-hyung =

South Korean entrepreneur (born 1979)

- 송치형
- Born: September 1979 (age 45–46); Gongju, South Chungcheong Province, South Korea
- Education: Seoul National University (BEc, BS)
- Occupation: Businessman
- Employer: Dunamu

Song Chi-hyung (Korean: 송치형; born September 1979) is a South Korean entrepreneur. The founder and chairman of the financial technology company Dunamu, which operates Upbit, Forbes estimates his net worth at US$1 billion as of July 2025.

== Early life and education ==
Song was born in September 1979 in Gongju, South Korea. He attended the Chungnam Science High School. Song attended Seoul National University in 1998, obtaining a Bachelor’s degree in computer science and economics.

== Career ==
After working at Danal, a mobile payment company, Song joined the consulting firm Innomove in 2011 and later established Dunamu in 2012.

Dunamu initially developed an e-book platform and a news aggregation service called Newsmate. Upbit, Dunamu's cryptocurrency exchange platform, was launched in 2017. In 2017, Song stepped down from the role of CEO to become chairman.

Forbes estimated his cryptocurrency wealth in 2018 to be between $350 and $500 million. Song publicly stated that his holdings were worth less than 1 million Korean won (approximately $800 USD at the time).

In 2018, Song and two other Upbit executives were accused of inflating trading volume and embezzling 150 billion won in rigged Bitcoin transactions. Upbit denied wrongdoing. In 2023, the Supreme Court of Korea ultimately found Song not guilty.

In 2021, Hybe Corporation acquired a 2.5% stake in Dunamu in a deal that valued Dunamu at $17 billion.
