= Hyosung Chemical =

South Korean chemical company

Hyosung Chemical Corporation
- Native name: 효성화학
- Industry: Manufacturing
- Founded: May 1979 as Tongyang Nylon Chemical Industry Division
- Founder: Cho Hong-jai, former Chairman of Hyosung Group
- Headquarters: 235, Banpo-daero, Seocho-gu, Seoul, Republic of Korea
- Key people: Lee Kun-jong CEO
- Products: Polypropylene and other petrochemical products, optical films, and specialty materials
- Services: Basic chemicals manufacturing, synthetic resins and polymer materials manufacturing
- Parent: Hyosung
- Website: Hyosung Chemical

Hyosung Chemical Corporation (Korean:효성화학, 曉星化學) is an integrated chemical materials company based in South Korea. The company operates businesses in polypropylene(PP), polyketone, terephthalic acid (TPA), industrial films, TAC films, specialty gases, and membrane technologies. As of December 31, 2023, Hyosung Chemical Corporation reported annual revenues of approximately $2.14 billion USD, with assets totaling around $3.12 billion USD.

== History ==
Hyosung Chemical Corporation traces its origins to Hyosung Group, founded in 1966. The company initially focused on industrial materials and later expanded into the chemical sector. In 1971, it established Korea's first private corporate research institute, driving advancements in polymer and resin technologies. By the 1980s, it started the development of a chip for manufacturing PET bottles and securing US FDA approval for beverage-grade PET resins. In 1998, Hyosung restructured its divisions, integrating multiple subsidiaries to streamline its operations with developments such as the world's second low-temperature heat-sealable resin and Korea's first PET milk bottle.

In 2000, Hyosung Chemical’s research institute developed Korea’s first PET milk bottle with a 240ml capacity. The following year, the company successfully developed ‘R200P’, becoming the third global and the first Asian manufacturer of polypropylene (PP) material for underfloor heating and plumbing applications. In 2003, it launched the POKETONE Lab to initiate research and development on polyketone, a high-performance polymer. In 2015, Hyosung Chemical became the first company in the world to commercialize polyketone and commenced operations at its dedicated POKETONE™ production facility in Yongyeon Plant, Ulsan, with an annual capacity of 50,000 tons.

In 2018, the company expanded globally, establishing Hyosung Vina Chemicals Corporation in Vietnam. That same year, Hyosung Chemical officially spun off from Hyosung Corporation focusing on the chemical business independently.

== Products ==
- PP/DH PU produces polypropylene (PP) resin, commonly used plastic raw material in daily life. Produces PP using 99.7% ultra-high purity propylene, used in pipes, sheets, heat-resistant appliances, high-impact BCP, TWIM, transparent containers, medical applications, special films, TER-PP, and compounding.
- TPA: Main raw material for high-functional polyester fiber, also used as raw material for PET bottles and polyester films. Used in detergent and beverage containers, engineering plastics, fiber applications, films, industrial applications, and cotton-type home furnishings.
- Polyketone: An engineering plastic first commercialized by Hyosung Chemical in 2015, branded as POKETONE™. It is FDA-certified and approved for drinking water applications, used in water purifier parts, food conveyor belt components, and toy materials. Also used in gears, automotive parts, packaging, E&E, food packaging and barrier films, and pipes.
- Industrial Gases: The company produces specialty gases like nitrogen trifluoride (NF₃) and fluorine-nitrogen mixtures (20% F₂N₂), which are essential in semiconductor and display manufacturing processes.
- Films: Produces PET films and nylon films. PET films are used in packaging, electronics, optical, and adhesive applications. Nylon films are used in food packaging, pharmaceuticals, and lithium secondary batteries.
- Optical Films: Since 2009, first in Korea to mass-produce TAC film that protects PVA polarizing film, a core material for LCD polarizers. Used in displays for TVs, monitors, laptops, tablets, and smartphones.
- Neochem: Produces specialty gases including NF_{3} and 20%F_{2}N_{2} used in semiconductor and display manufacturing processes. NF_{3} is used for CVD Chamber cleaning in semiconductor and display manufacturing processes, while 20%F_{2}N_{2} is used for cleaning LP_CVD equipment chambers in semiconductor manufacturing.
- Membrane: Developed water purifier separation membrane with proprietary technology. Pressurized hollow fiber membrane is used for water purification, industrial water, and seawater desalination pretreatment. The submerged hollow fiber membrane HSF-BS, Korea's only functional membrane module, is used for water and wastewater treatment.

== Global Presence ==
Hyosung Chemical operates production sites in South Korea and China, supplying its products to markets worldwide.

== See also ==
- Hyosung Group
