= Kim Jun-ki =

South Korean billionaire (born 1944)

- 김준기
- Born: December 4, 1944 (age 80); Donghae, Gangwon Province, South Korea
- Education: Korea University (graduated 1973)
- Occupation: Businessman
- Employer: DB Group
- Father: Kim Jin-man

Korean name
- Hangul: 김준기
- RR: Gim Jungi
- MR: Kim Chun'gi

Kim Jun-ki (Korean: 김준기; born December 4, 1944) is a South Korean businessman. Founder and former CEO of DB Group, he is among the richest people in South Korea. In December 2024, Forbes estimated his net worth at US$1.9 billion and ranked him the 18th richest in the country.

== Biography ==
He was born on December 4, 1944, in Donghae, Gangwon Province, South Korea as the oldest male and second of eight children. He came from a family of politicians and elites; his father was politician Kim Jin-man. His siblings eventually became elite figures in business and politics. He graduated from Kyunggi High School in 1964. He studied economics at Korea University. In 1969, during his studies he went on a trip to United States. He was inspired by what he saw, and decided to withdraw from university and found a construction company, Miryung Construction (미륭선설), that year. He would eventually graduate from university in 1973. In the 1970s, amidst a boom in construction in the Middle East, his company grew to become one of the 30 largest in South Korea. With this new capital, he acquired other businesses and entered other industries.

In 2009, he was sentenced to three years in prison, four in probation, and 200 hours of community service for illegal stock trading at the expense of the company. The following year, he was pardoned and released.

In 2015, he was accused of misappropriating company funds in order to secure the purchase of Dongbu Daewoo Electronics. The claim was investigated over the following two years, and the case closed without charges.

In 2018, his secretary reported that he habitually sexually harassed her from February to July 2017; for this he was investigated by the police. He reportedly left to the United States for medical treatment during the investigation, and did not respond to three police summons to return. The South Korean police attempted to secure the cooperation of Interpol to return him back to South Korea, but did not succeed. In September 2017, he stepped down from his position as chairman.

In 2024, a lawsuit alleging excessively high salaries was filed by DB Group shareholders against Kim and his son.

== Personal life ==
His wife is Kim Jeong-hee (김정희), daughter of Samyang Salt executive Kim Sang-jun (김상준). They married through an arranged marriage, and have one son and daughter. Their son, Kim Nam-ho (김남호; born 1975) is an executive at DB Insurance. His daughter Kim Ju-won (김주원) is married to Kim Ju-han (김주한), son of the chairman of Haedong Fire & Marine Insurance. The couple live in the United States.

Kim Nam-ho is considered the heir-apparent to the company.
