= Cho Jung-ho =

South Korean billionaire (born 1958)

- 조정호
- Born: October 5, 1958 (age 67); Incheon, South Korea
- Education: University of Southern California (BA); International Institute for Management Development (MBA)
- Occupation: Chairman of Meritz Financial Group
- Father: Cho Choong-hoon

Korean name
- Hangul: 조정호
- Hanja: 趙正鎬
- RR: Jo Jeongho
- MR: Cho Chŏngho

Cho Jung-ho (Korean: 조정호; born October 5, 1958) is a South Korean businessman and chairman of Meritz Financial Group. He is among the richest people in South Korea, with Forbes giving his net worth in December 2024 as US$6.8 billion and ranking him the fourth richest person in the country.

== Biography ==
Cho was born on October 5, 1958, in Incheon, South Korea as the fourth and youngest son of magnate Cho Choong-hoon, founder of the conglomerate Hanjin. He attended high school in Boston, United States and graduated with a bachelor's degree in economics from the University of Southern California. He received a Master of Business Administration degree from the International Institute for Management Development in Switzerland.

He worked at Korean Air as a manager in its European headquarters, then moved to Hanil Securities (한일증권). In 1989, he became a director at Hanjin Investment & Securities. In 2005, he broke the company off of Hanjin and renamed it Meritz, and became its chairman. The company reportedly rapidly grew thereafter.

He has announced that he had no intention of passing the company onto his children.
