= Leila Iskandar =

Leila Iskandar (Arabic: ليلى اسكندر), or other variants, may refer to:

- Laila Iskander (born 1949), Egyptian minister of the environment
- Layla Iskandar (born 2002), known as Lili Iskandar, Lebanese footballer

== See also ==
- Leila (name)
- Iskandar
