= Park Soon-jae =

South Korean biochemist and businessman (born 1954)

- 박순재
- Born: December 22, 1954 (age 71); Gunsan, South Korea
- Occupations: Businessman, biochemist
- Employer: Alteogen

Korean name
- Hangul: 박순재
- RR: Bak Sunjae
- MR: Pak Sunjae

Park Soon-jae (Korean: 박순재; born December 22, 1954) is a South Korean businessman and biochemist. He is the CEO and co-founder of the biotechnology company Alteogen. He founded the company alongside his wife Chung Hye-shin (정혜신), whom was the chief scientific officer of the company. He is among the richest people in South Korea; in 2025, Forbes estimated his net worth at US$3 billion and ranked him the 23rd richest person in the country.

== Biography ==
Park was born on December 22, 1954, in Gunsan, South Korea. In 1973, he graduated from Seoul High School. In 1980, he graduated from Yonsei University with a bachelor's in biochemistry. In 1985, he graduated from Purdue University with a PhD in biochemistry.

From 1986 to 1988, he worked as a researcher at the Massachusetts Institute of Technology (MIT). He worked in South Korea beginning in 1988 in various biotechnology research positions. In 1998, he became head of development in LG Chem. He worked in various leadership roles in LG Chem's life sciences division thereafter.

In 2006, he became managing director of Dream Pharma (드림파마). In 2008, he founded Alteogen with his wife, Chung Hye-shin. From 2009 to 2010 he served as chairman of pharmaceutical company Binex, and as a vice president from 2010 to 2011. He became Alteogen's CEO in either 2010 or 2011. By June 2024, he held a 19.2% stake of Alteogen. In December 2024, Alteogen had the largest market capitalization in the KOSDAQ exchange. Amidst this 2024 stock price surge, Park became a billionaire (by $US).

== Personal life ==
He has a wife, Chung Hye-shin, whom is a co-founder and former chief scientific officer of Alteogen, as well as a professor at Hannam University. They both received their doctorates from Purdue University and worked as researchers at MIT. The couple have a daughter, Park Su-min (박수민). In June 2024, Chung had a 0.8% stake in Alteogen, and Park Su-min a 0.5% stake. Chung left the company in September 2023 and controversially sold off much of her stake in the company in early 2024. Park Soon-jae assured stockholders that he would not sell off his own shares. Chung reportedly intended to work with non-profits and on other projects in biotechnology.
