= Mirae Asset Sharekhan =

Indian brokerage firm

- Type: Private
- Industry: Financial services
- Founded: 1995; 31 years ago
- Founder: Shripal Morakhia
- Headquarters: Mumbai, India
- Key people: Moon Kyung Kang (CEO)
- Number of employees: 3,500 (2024)
- Parent: Mirae Asset Financial Group
- Website: www.sharekhan.com

Mirae Asset Sharekhan is an Indian brokerage firm headquartered in Mumbai. Sharekhan was founded in 1995 and was acquired by the Mirae Asset Financial Group in November 2024.

Moon Kyung Kang is the current Chief Executive Officer (CEO) of Mirae Asset Sharekhan.

== History ==
Sharekhan was founded in 1995 by Mumbai-based entrepreneur Shripal Morakhia, whose family had a background in equity broking. It was among the early standalone brokerages in India and was backed by private equity firms Warburg Pincus and General Atlantic.

Sharekhan was acquired by BNP Paribas in 2017. It was rebranded as "Sharekhan" by BNP Paribas.

As of March 2024, Sharekhan was ranked eighth among retail brokerages, with over 700,000 active clients.

On 28 November 2024, Mirae Asset Financial Group announced the completion of its acquisition of Sharekhan for ₹3,000 crore (487 billion won). The entity was renamed Mirae Asset Sharekhan. It became the group's second brokerage platform, following the launch of m.Stock in 2022.
