= Lee Hae-jin =

South Korean businessman (born 1967)

- 이해진
- Born: June 22, 1967 (age 59); Seoul, South Korea
- Education: Seoul National University (BS); KAIST (MS)
- Occupation: Businessman
- Organization: Naver Corporation
- Known for: Founding Naver Corporation
- Children: 2

Korean name
- Hangul: 이해진
- Hanja: 李海珍
- RR: I Haejin
- MR: I Haejin

Lee Hae-jin (Korean: 이해진; born 22 June 1967) is a South Korean businessman known for founding Naver Corporation. He is among the richest people in South Korea; in December 2024, Forbes estimated his net worth at US$1.3 billion and ranked him 25th richest in the country.

== Early life and education ==
Lee was born on June 22, 1967, in Seoul, South Korea. Lee received his bachelor's degree in computer science from Seoul National University and earned a master's degree from the Korea Advanced Institute of Science and Technology.

== Career ==
Lee began his career at Samsung SDS before founding Naver.com in 1999. He previously served as CEO of Naver.com and Chairman of NHN Corporation and he currently holds the position of Founder and Chairman of the Board at Naver Corporation.
