= Cho Hyun-joon =

South Korean businessman (born 1968)

Cho Hyun-joon 조현준
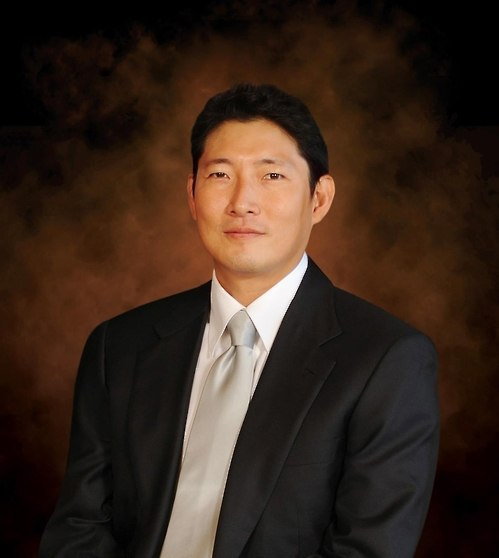
- Born: January 16, 1968 (age 58); Seoul, South Korea
- Education: Yale University (BA); Keio University (MA)
- Occupation: Businessman
- Organization: Hyosung Corporation
- Spouse: Lee Mi-Kyung
- Parent: Father: Cho S.R. Mother: Song Kwang-Ja

Cho Hyun-joon (조현준; born January 16, 1968) is a South Korean businessman and has been the Chairman of Hyosung Group since 2017.

== Early life ==
Born in Seoul in 1968, Cho married Lee Mi-Kyung who is third daughter of Lee Hee-sang, a member of the Dong-Awon Group in 2001. They have three children, Cho In-Young, Cho In-Seo and Cho Jae-Hyun.

== Promotion to Chairman ==
On December 29, 2016, Cho Hyun-joon took office as chairman.

== Educational Background ==
He graduated from Posung Middle School in 1983 and St. Paul's School in the U.S. in 1987. In 1991, he studied in the School of Political Science at Yale University and graduated with a master's degree at Keio University, Graduate School of Law in Japan in 1996.

== Business activities ==
=== Spandex business and international expansion ===
Cho Hyun-joon played a role in expanding Hyosung Group's spandex operations in international markets, particularly in China and India. As head of the group's textile business, he was involved in expanding manufacturing capacity and developing overseas operations. In July 2016, Cho visited China to discuss investment opportunities and the expansion of Hyosung's textile and chemical businesses. At the time, Hyosung operated manufacturing and sales facilities across China and held a leading position in the country's spandex market. The company had also maintained its position as the world's largest spandex manufacturer since 2010. In February 2018, Cho met Indian Prime Minister Narendra Modi during the Magnetic Maharashtra investment summit and announced plans to invest approximately US$100 million in a spandex manufacturing plant in Maharashtra, India. The plant began commercial operations in September 2019, with an annual production capacity of approximately 18,000 metric tons.

=== Overseas manufacturing and bio-based materials ===
During Cho's chairmanship, Hyosung continued expanding its international manufacturing operations and investing in bio-based textile materials. In May 2026, Hyosung TNC began operating a bio-based 1,4-butanediol (Bio-BDO) production facility in Vietnam. The plant, developed as part of a US$1 billion investment project, has an initial annual production capacity of 50,000 metric tons, with infrastructure designed to support a potential expansion to 200,000 metric tons per year. Bio-BDO is used to produce polytetramethylene ether glycol (PTMG), a raw material for spandex manufacturing. Cho identified bio-based materials as part of Hyosung's long-term business strategy.

=== Power equipment and international contracts ===
Under Cho's chairmanship, Hyosung Heavy Industries expanded its international power equipment business, including high-voltage transformers, reactors and energy storage systems. In March 2026, the company secured a battery energy storage system project worth approximately KRW 142.5 billion in Queensland, Australia. In July 2026, Hyosung Heavy Industries entered into a long-term framework agreement with Australian transmission network operator AusNet to supply high-voltage transformers and reactors. The agreement was valued at approximately KRW 312 billion, with supplies scheduled between 2027 and 2032. Following the agreement, Cho stated that the company intended to expand its involvement in next-generation power grid technologies, including high-voltage direct current transmission.

=== Development of HVDC technology ===
During Cho's tenure, Hyosung Heavy Industries invested in the development and commercialization of high-voltage direct current (HVDC) transmission technology. In July 2024, a 200 MW voltage-source converter HVDC installation was completed at the Yangju Substation in Gyeonggi Province. The project was developed through a domestic technology localization initiative involving Hyosung Heavy Industries and other participating organizations. In July 2025, Hyosung Heavy Industries began construction of a dedicated HVDC transformer manufacturing facility in Changwon, South Gyeongsang Province. The company announced plans to invest approximately KRW 330 billion in its HVDC business, including KRW 254 billion for the new factory, as well as additional manufacturing facilities and research and development. The factory is scheduled for completion in July 2027. Cho described HVDC technology as a strategic priority for Hyosung's future power equipment business

== Career ==
In 1992, he joined Mitsubishi Corporation in Tokyo, Japan as a new employee and worked for the Energy Department and the Oil Import Department. In 1995, he worked at Morgan Stanley Tokyo branch at the Corporate Sales Department. In 1997, he joined Hyosung T & C (now Hyosung) as the manager of the management planning team and engaged in the merger of Hyosung T & C, Hyosung Products, Hyosung Life Industry, and Hyosung Heavy Industries. He was promoted to Managing Director in 2000, Executive Director in 2001 and to Vice President in 2003. He served as the Chief of Hyosung Trade PG in 2005, Hyosung Chief of Textile PG and President of Trade PG in 2007 while in 2011 he was Hyosung Chief of Textile and President of IT PG and Strategy HQ. He was inaugurated as the Chairman of Hyosung Group in 2017.

== Personal life ==
Cho is fluent in a variety of foreign languages such as English, Japanese, and Italian, and is interested in various fields such as politics, culture, and society. He has been acquainted with young leaders of the United States, Japan and China.
