= Mirae Asset Securities =

South Korean banking company

Mirae Asset Securities Co., Ltd.

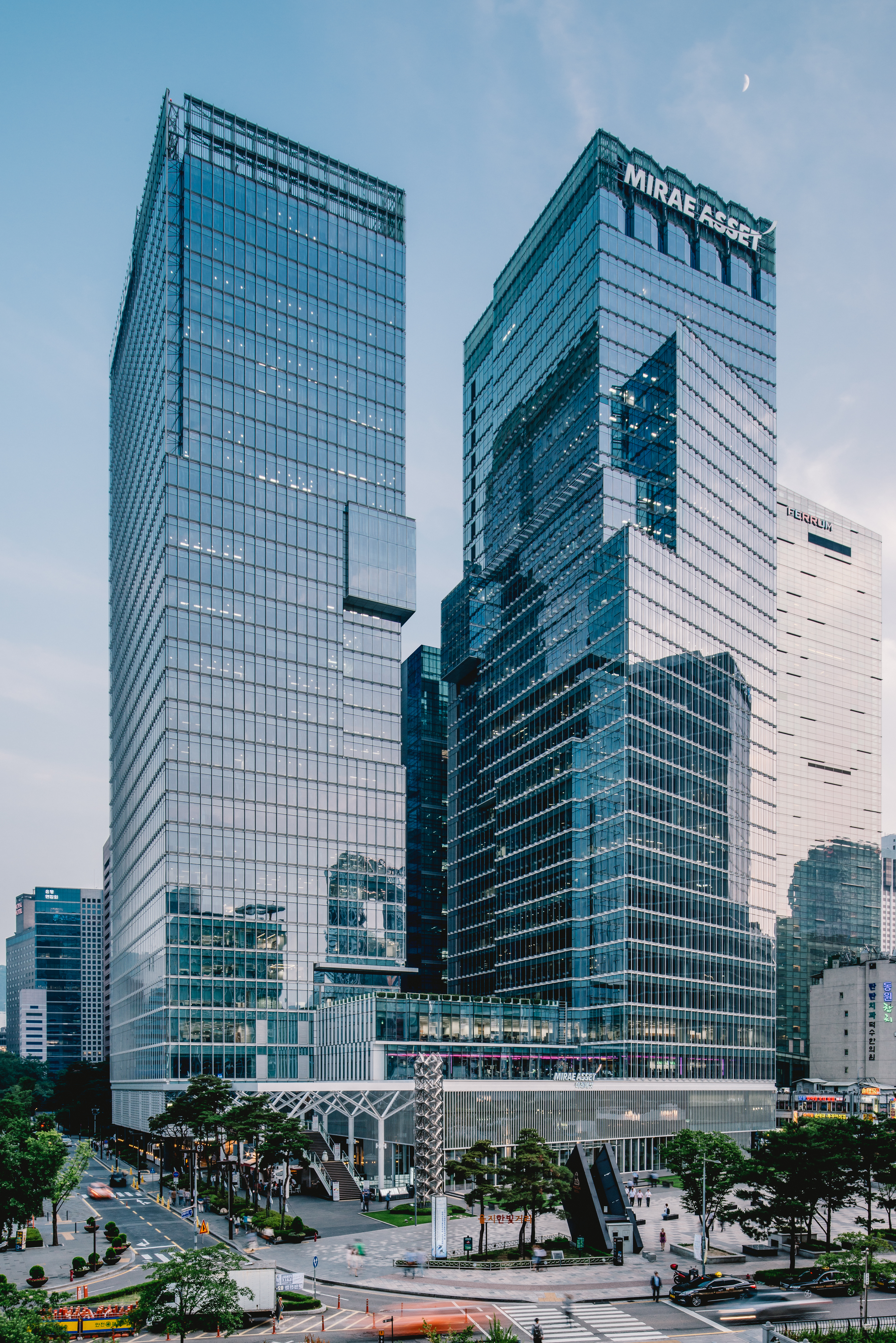
- Mirae Asset Center 1 in Seoul
- Native name: 미래에셋증권 주식회사
- Formerly: Daewoo Securities; Mirae Asset Daewoo
- Type: Public
- Traded as: KRX: 006800
- Industry: Financial services
- Founded: 1970; 56 years ago
- Founder: Park Hyeon-joo
- Headquarters: 26, Eulji-ro 5-gil, Jung-gu, Seoul, South Korea
- Area served: Worldwide
- Key people: Kim, Mi Seob (Vice Chairman and CEO) / Her, Sun Ho (Vice Chairman and CEO)
- Products: Investment banking
- Website: Mirae Asset Securities

Mirae Asset Securities Co., Ltd. (Korean: 미래에셋증권 주식회사; RR: Mirae Eset Jeunggwon Jusik Hoesa) is the largest investment banking and stock brokerage company by market capitalization in South Korea. Mirae Asset Securities has been merged with Daewoo Securities as the end of December 2016.

== Overview ==
Mirae Asset Securities is a financial services company that provides brokerage services, investment banking, wealth management, IPO underwriting and various consulting services.

== History ==
Mirae Asset Securities was founded in 1999, a year after Mirae Asset Global Investments, Korea's first retail mutual funds offering asset management company, was founded. In the meantime, Daewoo Securities was founded in 1970 as a part of the conglomerate Daewoo Corporation. Daewoo Securities was spun off from the Daewoo Corporation in 1999 and has merged to Korea Development Bank and merged with Mirae Asset Securities as of the end of 2016.

In January 2016, Mirae Asset Securities succeeded bidding to buy a 43 percent stake in Daewoo Securities for 2.39 trillion won ($2 billion) in a deal that created South Korea's largest financial service providing company by assets.

On March 24, 2021, Mirae Asset Securities was renamed from Mirae Asset Daewoo.

== Global business ==
Mirae Asset Securities engages in global brokerage, investment banking, and trading businesses in ten foreign countries. Since the foundation of the group, Hyeon-Joo Park always wanted to expand the business globally in order to diversify the business portfolio. Before the merge, Mirae Asset Securities engaged in investment activities of buildings and infrastructures: Mirae Asset Tower at Pudong, Shanghai in 2006, Four Seasons Hotel at Sydney in 2013, 1801K street building at Washington D.C. in 2014, Amazon Phase VIII at Seattle in 2016, Fairmont Hotel in San Francisco in 2015, Hyatt Regency Resort at Hawaii in 2016, Novo Nordisk at New Jersey in 2016, Federal Government Office at Australia in 2017, T8 Office Building in Germany, The Center Building at Hong Kong in 2018, FedEx logistics centers across six US cities in 2018, EPIC NGL Pipeline at Texas in 2018, Gas Cogeneration Plant at New Jersey in 2018, Hanoi Logistics at Vietnam in 2018, The Cosmopolitan Hotel at Las Vegas in 2018, Four Seasons Hotel in Hawaii in 2018, Aoyama Building in Japan in 2019, Tour Majunga in France in 2019, Anbang Hotel Portfolio in 2019, etc.

Mirae Asset Securities Hong Kong acted as a joint book-running co-manager for BioNTech, a German biotechnology firm, which has been the first South Korean securities company to become an initial public offering underwriter on NASDAQ.

== Sustainability ==
Mirae Asset Securities has been listed in Dow Jones Sustainability Index World for 9 consecutive years. Mirae Asset Securities also has been listed in Dow Jones Sustainability Index Asia-Pacific and Korea for 11 consecutive years as well as of November 2020.
