= Meritz Financial Group =

South Korean financial holding company

Meritz Financial Group Inc.
- Native name: 주식회사 메리츠금융지주
- Type: Public
- Traded as: KRX: 138040
- Industry: Financial services
- Predecessor: Financial arm of Hanjin
- Founded: March 2011; 15 years ago
- Headquarters: Seoul, South Korea
- Key people: Cho Jung-ho (Chairman)
- Website: www.meritzgroup.com

Meritz Financial Group Inc. (Korean: 주식회사 메리츠금융지주) is a financial holding company headquartered in Seoul, South Korea. Meritz Financial, with its major subsidiaries including Meritz Fire & Marine Insurance and Meritz Securities, is one of the major financial groups in South Korea.

== History ==
Meritz Financial Group was formed when Hanjin Group founder Cho Choong-hoon died in 2002. After the founder's death, the group was succeeded by his four sons. Cho Jung-ho, the founder's fourth son, inherited Hanjin's financial arm, including Oriental Fire & Marine Insurance, Meritz Securities, and Korean-French Banking. In 2005, Cho formally broke off the financial affiliates from Hanjin and renamed them Meritz Financial Group. In 2011, Meritz Fire & Marine Insurance launched a financial holding company. It was founded by spinning off a holding company, Meritz Financial Group Inc., from Meritz Fire & Marine Insurance. Meritz Financial Group has five major subsidiaries, including Meritz Fire & Marine Insurance, Meritz Securities, Meritz Asset Management, Meritz Alternative Investment Management, and Meritz Capital.
