= Cheonan National Technical College =

1973–2005 college in South Korea

- Type: Public
- Active: 1973–2005
- Academic staff: 90
- Location: Cheonan, South Chungcheong, South Korea; 36.85027°N 127.15003°E
- Website: https://web.archive.org/web/20041229165240/http://www.cntc.ac.kr/

- Cheonan National Technical College
- Hangul: 천안공업대학
- Hanja: 天安工業大學
- RR: Cheonan gongeop daehak
- MR: Ch'ŏnan kongŏp taehak

Cheonan National Technical College was a public vocational college located in Cheonan City, South Chungcheong province, South Korea. The school was amalgamated with Kongju National University in 2005 and exists today as Kongju National University's Cheonan campus.

== Academics ==
Academic offerings are largely in industrial and technical fields. The various departments are divided into three divisions: Machinery, Electricity and Electronic Communications, and Materials and Environmental Design. In addition, the department of liberal arts is not affiliated with any division.

== History ==
The school opened in 1973 as Cheonan Industrial Technical School (천안공업전문학교). It was brought under national jurisdiction in 1982.

== Sister schools ==
Ties exist with schools in Japan (Nagano Technical Junior College), Taiwan (National Formosa University), Australia (University of Newcastle) and America (Bemidji State University).

== See also ==
- Education in South Korea
- List of colleges and universities in South Korea
