= Yoo Jung-hyun (businesswoman) =

South Korean billionaire (born 1969)

- 유정현
- Born: April 16, 1969 (age 56)
- Occupations: Director of NXC, holding company of Nexon
- Spouse: Kim Jung-ju (died 2022)
- Children: 2

Korean name
- Hangul: 유정현
- RR: Yu Jeonghyeon
- MR: Yu Chŏnghyŏn

Yoo Jung-hyun (Korean: 유정현; born April 16, 1969) is a South Korean auditor and businesswoman. The widow of Kim Jung-ju, the founder of video game company Nexon, she is among the richest people in South Korea, with Forbes estimating her net worth at US$2 billion and ranking her 15th richest person in the country in December 2024.

== Biography ==
She joined Nexon upon its founding in 1994 as head of management support and of a subcompany called Nexon Networks. In 2003, she became a director of Nexon and of its holding company NXC. She was made an auditor of NXC in 2010. In 2023, she was again made director of NXC.

=== Death of Kim Jung-ju ===
She has two daughters with her husband Kim Jung-ju. In 2022, Kim died while on a trip in Hawaii, United States. He had had depression, and it was suspected that his depression worsened around that time. Due to his passing, she became the largest shareholder in NXC (which in turn is the largest shareholder in Nexon); she came to hold a 34% stake in the company. She also directly held around 16.3% of Nexon stock. Her two children also owned around 30% of NXC stock each. She began participating in board meetings. In 2024, NXC announced it was buying some of its shares from Yoo and her children.
