= Park Hyeon-joo =

South Korean businessman (born 1958)

- Born: October 17, 1958 (age 68); Gwangju, South Korea
- Education: Korea University (BA, 1983)
- Occupation: Businessman
- Employer: Mirae Asset Financial Group
- Children: 3

Park Hyeon-joo (Korean: 박현주; born October 17, 1958) is a South Korean businessman. He is the founder of Mirae Asset Financial Group and a venture capitalist. Called the "father of South Korea's mutual fund industry", he established the first mutual fund in the country in 1998.

He is among the richest people in South Korea. In December 2024, Forbes estimated his net worth as US$1.1 billion and ranked him 31st richest in the country.

== Biography ==
Park was born on October 17, 1958 in Gwangju, South Korea. In 1977, he graduated from Gwangju Jeil High School. In 1983, he graduated from Korea University with a bachelor's in business administration.

In 1986, he joined Dongyang Securities (동양증권; now part of Yuanta Securities). In 1991, he became branch manager of Dongwon Securities (동원증권; now part of Korea Investment & Securities). In 1996, he was made director of the Gangnam branch of Dongwon Securities.

On July 18, 1997, he cofounded Mirae Asset Investment Advisory and Mirae Asset Global Investments, along with eight colleagues from the securities industry. The company was the first professional asset management company in Korean history. In December 1998, he established the first mutual fund in the country, which was called "Park Hyeon-joo No. 1" (박현주1호). The mutual fund quickly proved to be extremely popular, and sold out within hours of its launch. In 2001, he became the chairman of Mirae Asset Group. The company began expanding internationally beginning in 2004.

In 2009, Harvard Business School created a case study on Park and his experience at Mirae Asset. Beginning in 2010, he began donating all his received dividends to talent development and social welfare programs through his foundation, the Mirae Asset Park Hyeon Joo Foundation.

In 2020, a subcompany of Mirae Asset, the vast majority of which was held by Park and his family (91.86%), was fined for unfair transactions that benefitted the owners of the company. Park did not receive any criminal charges for this, as Park did not order the transaction.

== Personal life ==
He is married to Kim Mi-gyeong (김미경). The couple have children Park Ha-min (박하민), Park Eun-min (박은민), and Park Jun-beom (박준범). Their three children have each studied in the United States.

== Awards ==
- Korea Management Award (한국의 경영자상) (2008)
- Dasan Financial Grand Prize (2017)
- International Executive of the Year Award, Academy of International Business (2024)
