= Hyosung =

South Korean conglomerate

Hyosung Corporation
- Native name: 효성그룹
- Type: Public company
- Traded as: KRX: 004800 (listed on 30 June 1973)
- ISIN: KR7004800009
- Industry: Conglomerate (Chemical, Construction, Heavy industries, Information & communication, Textiles, Trading)
- Founded: November 3, 1966; 60 years ago
- Founder: Cho Hong-jai (趙洪濟)
- Headquarters: 119, Mapo-daero, Mapo-gu, Seoul, South Korea
- Area served: Worldwide
- Key people: Cho Hyun-joon (Chairman & CEO); Yun Eun Whang (CEO)
- Services: Non-financial holding company
- Revenue: ₩3.4367 trillion (2023)
- Operating income: ₩138.7 billion (2020)
- Total assets: ₩5.0889 trillion (2023)
- Total equity: ₩105,355,125,000 (2020)
- Owner: Cho Hyun-joon and related parties (55.11%); National Pension Service (11.11%)
- Number of employees: 656 (2023, non-consolidated)
- Subsidiaries: Hyosung TNC Corporation; Hyosung Heavy Industries Corporation; Hyosung Chemical Corporation; Hyosung TNS Corporation; etc.
- Website: Official website

- Hyosung
- Hangul: 효성
- Hanja: 曉星
- RR: Hyoseong
- MR: Hyosŏng

Hyosung Group is a major South Korean conglomerate established in 1966. The company operates across diverse sectors including textiles, heavy industries, chemicals, and information & communication.

== History ==
=== Founding and early growth (1966–1979) ===
Hyosung was founded in 1966 as Tongyang Nylon Corporation. In 1970, the company merged with Hanil Nylon Co.Ltd., and the following year established its Electronic Communication Research Center. In 1973, the group expanded further with the foundation of Tongyang Dye Engineering Co.Ltd., Tongyang Polyester Co.Ltd., and Toplon Co.Ltd. HanYoung Industrial Co.Ltd., was acquired in 1975. By 1978, the group had developed BCF yarn for carpets and founded the Heavy Industries Technology Research Institute. The group acquired Yulsan Heavy Industries and Yulsan Aluminium from the Yulsan Group in September 1979.

=== Expansion and diversification (1980–1997) ===
In 1980, Hyosung constructed its Gumi Computer Plant. In 1984, the group merged with Toplon Co., Ltd. and Hyosung Construction Co., Ltd., and in 1985 and 1986 established Hyosung NAS Co., Ltd. (currently Hyosung Information Systems) and Hyosung Hitachi Data Systems Co., Ltd. (currently Hyosung TNS), respectively. The late 1980s saw further growth, with the foundation of Korea Engineering Plastics Co., Ltd. and the Resin Processing Research Institute in 1987 and 1988, the merger with Wonmi Fiber Industry Co., Ltd. in 1987, and entry into the PP and propylene business alongside the foundation of Hyosung EBARA in 1989.

The group continued to grow through the 1990s. In 1994, Hyosung Information & Communication Co., Ltd. was established. In 1996, Dongyang Nylon was renamed Hyosung T&C and Dongyang Polyester became Hyosung Living Industry. That same year, Hyosung VINA Co., Ltd. was established in Vietnam and the group started its polyester film business.

=== Restructuring and consolidation (1998–2010) ===
In 1998, Hyosung T&C, Hyosung Trading, Hyosung Living Industry, and Hyosung Heavy Industries merged to form Hyosung Corporation. The company subsequently reorganized into five Performance Groups (PGs) and 31 Performance Units (PUs).

In 2003, the group developed nylon 66 yarn for airbags and the silver fiber brand 'Mipan Magic Silver', and established The Class Hyosung, an imported car sales corporation. Product innovation continued in 2004 with the launch of the nylon 66 clothing yarn 'Zenio', the PTT carpet 'Ion-free', and the silver nanofiber 'Mipan Nano Magic Silver'. In 2006, the group successfully developed Korea's first wind turbine system, and in 2007 launched the recycled yarn 'Mipan regen'.

In 2008, Hyosung acquired ChinHung International, Inc. and completed a photovoltaic power plant in Taean, Chungcheongnam-do. Hyosung Toyota Corporation was established in 2009, and in 2010 the Fiber PG supplied Askin materials to Uniqlo.

=== Global growth and innovation (2011–2017) ===
In 2011, the group signed an industry-record $1.8 billion steel cord supply contract through its Tire & Industrial Reinforcements PU and acquired Global Safety Textiles (GST), the world's largest airbag fabric manufacturer. Also that year, the Wind Power Division shipped its first commercial 2MW wind turbine.

In 2013, the group launched its carbon fiber brand 'TANSOME' and the integrated apartment brand 'Hyosung Harrington Place'. The year also marked the world's first commercialization of the high polymer material polyketone and the securing of certification for a pressurized hollow fiber membrane module by Hyosung R&DB Labs. In 2014, Hyosung opened Some Sevit (Sevit Island) on the Han River.

In 2016, the Power Systems PU developed Korea's first 15MW-class tidal power generator and the POK Business Division obtained automotive management system certification. In 2017, Cho Hyun-joon was appointed as Hyosung Group chairman and representative director.

=== Holding company transition and recent developments (2018–present) ===
In 2018, Hyosung restructured into a holding company model, with Hyosung Corporation becoming the holding company and four operating companies, Hyosung TNC, Hyosung Advanced Materials, Hyosung Heavy Industries, and Hyosung Chemical, established as subsidiaries. In 2019, the group established a Production Technology Center, introduced sustainable spandex under the 'creora regen' brand, established Korea's first liquid hydrogen refueling station in Samcheok, Gangwon Province, and successfully developed and demonstrated Korea's first voltage-source HVDC system.

In 2020, Hyosung Chemical partnered with the Korea Institute of Science and Technology (KIST) to develop advanced gas barrier packaging film materials. In 2021, Hyosung Heavy Industries and Linde established a joint venture for a liquid hydrogen business and commenced construction of the Ulsan liquid hydrogen plant. In 2022, Hyosung TNC achieved the world's first commercialization of bio-based spandex. In 2023, Hyosung TNC launched sustainable black spandex and became the first company to apply recycled fishing net fiber ('regen Ocean Nylon') in outdoor apparel.

== Successive Chairmen ==
- Cho Hong-jai (1966–1984)
- Cho Suk-rae (1984–2017)
- Cho Hyun-joon (2017–present)

== Corporate Structure ==
Hyosung Group transitioned to a holding company structure on 1 June 2018, with Hyosung Corporation as the holding company. Hyosung Corporation holds stakes in four major affiliates: Hyosung TNC, Hyosung Heavy Industries, Hyosung Advanced Materials, and Hyosung Chemical. As of March 2024, the largest shareholder chairman Cho Hyun-joon and related parties hold a 56.1% stake. As of 1 July 2024, the group was restructured into two holding companies: the existing company Hyosung and the newly established Hyosung New Holdings. As of the end of 2023, Hyosung Group comprises 124 affiliates with 113 business sites across 28 countries, maintaining global production and sales networks.

== Major Affiliates ==
Hyosung's major affiliates include Hyosung TNC, Hyosung Heavy Industries, Hyosung Chemical, and Hyosung TNS. Other affiliates and associates include Hyosung ITX, Hyosung Ventures, Galaxia Money Tree, Galaxia Next, Galaxia Device, Galaxia Electronics, Galaxia SM, Galaxia Metaverse, FMK, and Shinwha Intertek, among others.

== Business Areas ==
- Textile/Trading (Hyosung TNC)
  - Textile Business Division
    - CREORA™: Launched in 1992, the spandex brand maintains world's largest market share. Currently operates as an integrated brand encompassing not only spandex but also functional nylon and polyester products.
    - regen™: A sustainable fiber brand producing recycled and bio-based fibers. First in the world to develop nylon using discarded fishing nets as raw material in 2007, and became first in Korea to develop polyester recycled from waste PET bottles in 2008.
  - Trading Business Division
    - Steel: Exports products from POSCO, Hyundai Steel, KG Steel, Dongbu Steel, and others. Handles hot-rolled coils, wire rods, cold-rolled coils, galvanized steel sheets, stainless steel products, and others.
    - Chemical: Imports and exports petrochemical products, fine chemicals, and mineral resources. Handles synthetic fiber raw materials, synthetic resin products, fine chemicals, and mining chemicals.
  - Other Business
    - Some Sevit: It is a multi-cultural space on the Han River, the world's first floating architectural complex. Consists of three islands – Gavit, Chavit, and Solvit – and a waterfront stage space called Yevit, operating F&B facilities and water leisure facilities.
    - Gwangju Refrigerated Warehouse: An urban cold storage facility serving as a logistics hub for the metropolitan area. Holds ISO 9001 and HACCP certifications.
- Heavy Industries/Construction (Hyosung Heavy Industries)
  - Power System Solutions: Maintains the highest cumulative market share in Korea's power transmission and distribution sector. Produces power equipment including extra-high-voltage transformers, circuit breakers, and electrical components, providing engineering, design, manufacturing, installation, testing, and maintenance services. Major products include power equipment (extra-high-voltage transformers, distribution transformers, shunt reactors, circuit breakers, high voltage switchgear, mobile substations), power systems (STATCOM, DC transmission systems, ESS, microgrids, solar solutions), digital solutions (asset performance management solutions (ARMOUR), preventive diagnostic systems), and welding solutions (arc welding machines, resistance welding machines, Robot package systems).
  - Electric & Mechanical Solutions: Korea's leading electric motor manufacturer. The company produces a range of motors from low-voltage small and medium-sized motors to high-voltage ultra-large motors, super premium efficiency motors, BLDC motors, and Q-Class motors for nuclear power plants. In the generator sector, manufactures and exports power generation systems for ships, steam turbines, and water turbines, as well as MG-Sets for fuel rod control to overseas nuclear power plants. Major products include motors & generators (high-voltage motors, low-voltage motors, DC motors, special motors, commercial generators), industrial machinery systems (chemical equipment, gas charging stations), and gear solutions (gearboxes, geared motors).
  - Sustainable Solutions: Provides next-generation power equipment, hydrogen energy, power grid stabilization solutions, renewable energy, and digital solutions.
  - Others
    - Hyosung Goodsprings: Formerly known as Hyosung EBARA. Produces and supplies pumps for power plants, petrochemical applications, buildings and residential use, industrial applications, desalination facilities, and marine applications, while also constructing and supplying desalination facilities (RO Plants). It is Korea's leading pump manufacturer.
    - Wind Power Business Division: Developed Korea's first 750kW (Geared type) and 2MW wind power turbines in 2006. Develops and supplies wind turbines in capacities such as 750kW, 2MW, and 5MW.
  - Construction Business
    - Conducts construction business through ChinHung International, Inc., established in 1959, engaging in building construction, SOC projects, and housing development. The company constructs residential buildings under the 'Hyosung Harrington Place' brand.
    - Chinhung International, Inc.: A comprehensive construction company handling projects from apartments (Hyosung Harrington Place) to school and military BTL projects, urban office and commercial facilities, major road and bridge construction including Youngdong Expressway and Seoul subway construction, national development projects such as Incheon International Airport site preparation, and civil engineering projects including water and sewage pipeline construction and environmental projects.
    - Gongdeok Gyeongwoo Development : A corporation established for the development of Gongdeok Hyosung Harrington Place.
- Chemical (Hyosung Chemical)
  - Polypropylene (PP): PP/DH PU produces polypropylene (PP) resin, the most commonly used plastic raw material in daily life. Produces PP using 99.7% ultra-high purity propylene, used in pipes, sheets, heat-resistant appliances, high-impact BCP, TWIM, transparent containers, medical applications, special films, TER-PP, and compounding.
  - TPA: Primary raw material for high-functional polyester fiber, also used as raw material for PET bottles and polyester films. Used in detergent and beverage containers, engineering plastics, fiber applications, films, industrial applications, and cotton-type home furnishings.
  - Polyketone: An engineering plastic first commercialized by Hyosung Chemical in 2013, branded as POKETONE™. FDA-certified and approved for drinking water applications, used in water purifier parts, food conveyor belt components, and toy materials. Also used in gears, automotive parts, packaging, E&E, food packaging and barrier films, and pipes.
  - Films: Produces PET films and nylon films. PET films are used in packaging, electronics, optical, and adhesive applications. Nylon film production, which began in 1996, has expanded through facilities in Jiaxing, China (2018) and Quzhou (2023). Nylon films are used in food packaging, pharmaceuticals, and lithium secondary batteries. First entered the market in 1996.
  - Optical Films: First in Korea to mass-produce TAC film that protects PVA polarizing film, a core material for LCD polarizers since 2009. Used in displays for TVs, monitors, laptops, tablets, and smartphones.
  - Neochem: Produces specialty gases including NF_{3} and 20%F_{2}N_{2} used in semiconductor and display manufacturing processes. NF_{3} is used for CVD Chamber cleaning in semiconductor and display manufacturing processes, while 20%F_{2}N_{2}is used for cleaning LP_CVD equipment chambers in semiconductor manufacturing.
  - Membrane: Developed water purifier separation membrane with proprietary technology. Pressurized hollow fiber membrane is used for water purification, industrial water, and seawater desalination pretreatment. The submerged hollow fiber membrane HSF-BS, Korea's only functional membrane module, is used for water and wastewater treatment.
- Information & Communication (Hyosung TNS)
  - Launched in 1979 as a financial IT company, it established Korea's first computer specialized factory in 1980, and founded Korea's largest financial automation equipment Mechatronics research institute in 1983. The company maintains market leadership in Korea, USA, Russia, and Indonesia, achieving comprehensive capabilities across all areas of the financial automation industry including development, manufacturing, maintenance, financial VAN, and outsourcing services.
  - In terms of the overseas market, since initiating exports to the US in 1998, Hyosung has achieved the number one market share in the US Retail ATM market and established itself as a global company, exporting over 910,000 self-developed ATMs to more than 30 countries worldwide. Develops, manufactures, and supplies Automated Teller Machines (ATM), Cash Dispensers (CDP), utility bill payment kiosks, cash recyclers, MoniManager (ATM Total Management System, ATMS), ATM Total outsourcing, MyCashZone, SmileEDI, and electronic banking centers. Among Shinhan Bank's ATMs, only those manufactured by Nautilus Hyosung and ATEC support Naver Pay cash withdrawals. Also produced 8-bit PCs in the 1980s.
  - Provides solutions for bank branch channel transformation and cash management efficiency improvement. Expanding into new business markets including retail solutions and data platforms
    - Financial Automation Equipment (ATM)
    - Branch Transformation Solution
    - Retail Solutions: Self-ordering kiosks, self-checkout systems, robot baristas
    - Software Solutions (BlueVerse)
    - Data Platform Business (NFT Town, ENTA)
    - ATM Plus: Formerly Kiss Bank.
    - NH CMS: Formerly Nautilus Hyosung ATM Operations Team.
    - NH Tech: IT equipment maintenance company.
    - Hyosung FMS: Company operating CMS services for Hyosung Group's electronic financial corporation.

== Logo Trademark Dispute ==
The logo currently used by Hyosung, which was designed to represent a large tree and has been in use since 1 May 1981, became involved in a legal dispute due to its similarity to the National Livestock Cooperatives Federation's logo (established 1 January of the same year), which depicted a bull's head. In 1999, the Supreme Court ruled that Hyosung could not use its logo in the financial sector where it overlapped with the National Livestock Cooperatives Federation. However, the dispute was naturally resolved when the National Livestock Cooperatives Federation merged with the National Agricultural Cooperative Federation in 2000 and discontinued the use of the disputed logo.

== Headquarters ==
- 119 Mapo-daero, Mapo-gu, Seoul, Republic of Korea (Gongdeok-dong)

== See also ==
- Economy of South Korea
