= Collaborative Fund =

American venture capital firm

- Founded: 2010
- Founder: Craig Shapiro
- Type: Venture capital
- Headquarters: New York City, New York, United States
- Products: Investments
- Key people: Craig Shapiro (Founder and Managing Partner); Andrew Montgomery (Partner); Guy Vidra (Partner); Morgan Housel (Partner); Sophie Bakalar (Partner)
- Website: collabfund.com

Collaborative Fund is a venture capital firm that provides seed and early stage funding to consumer industry and climate technology companies.

== Firm ==
Founded in 2010 by Craig Shapiro, the firm is based in New York City, New York, with approximately $1B of assets under management. The firm closed its fourth flagship fund for $100 million in 2018. In 2022, it launched the Shared Future Fund, which invests in climate technology. The firm raised its sixth flagship fund, valued at $125 million, in 2024, completing the process in 90 days.

With around 25 full-time employees, the firm is active in the food, healthcare, climate technology, and consumer industries. Since its founding, it has invested in over 300 companies and achieved nearly 60 successful exits, including Kickstarter, Lyft, Blue Bottle Coffee, and Reddit. The firm has helped fuel the growth of over 24 unicorns and IPOs.

Notable investments include Sweetgreen, Beyond Meat, and Scopely, which was acquired by Savvy Games Group for $4.9 billion. The firm's approach focuses on backing companies that are "doing good" while achieving returns, with early investments often yielding exponential growth – for instance, investments under $10 million in companies like The Farmer's Dog have grown to billions.

In 2016, economics journalist Morgan Housel joined the firm as a partner and content creator, producing articles and podcasts. The firm has launched or spun out specialized funds, including Collab+Currency (focusing on the blockchain).

== Partnerships ==
In 2014, Collaborative Fund launched a $10 million joint investment vehicle with Line, a Japanese messaging service.

In 2016, Collaborative Fund partnered with Sesame Workshop to form a $10 million joint fund, Collab + Sesame, to invest in startups focused on education, health, and social welfare for children. The joint fund has invested in startups like the educational platform Yup Technologies.

In 2022, the firm partnered with fashion designer Stella McCartney to launch the Collab SOS fund, a $200 million sustainability fund.

In 2023, it acquired a stake in Korean venture capital firm Sopoong Ventures to expand into Asia.

=== Harvard Wyss Institute ===
In 2023, the firm partnered with the Wyss Institute for Biologically Inspired Engineering, investing $15 million to create the Laboratory for Sustainable Materials Research and Innovation. In 2024, this partnership developed the Sensory Nature-Inspired Fact Finder of Indoor Air (SNIFFIA), a hand-held air quality sensor modeled after mammalian olfactory sensors.
