= Taekwang Industrial =

South Korean chemical and textile company

Taekwang Industrial Co, Ltd.
- Native name: 태광산업 주식회사
- Type: Subsidiary
- Founded: 1950; 76 years ago
- Founder: Lee Im Yong
- Headquarters: Seoul, South Korea
- Key people: Lee Boo-ui, Jeong In-chol (CEO)
- Revenue: 2.1 trillion KRW (2011)
- Parent: Taekwang Group
- Website: taekwang.co.kr

Taekwang Industrial Co, Ltd. (Korean: 태광산업 주식회사) is a South Korean chemical and textile company headquartered in the Jangchung-dong area of central Seoul, with plants located in China as well as in Korea. Founded by Lee Im Yong in 1950, the company has developed into a manufacturer of textiles, petrochemicals, wet weather and safety clothing products, and is part of the Taekwang Group. Taekwang Industrial had established a foundation in Seoul Sehwa High School. Taekwang produces Acelan brand spandex, raincoats, umbrellas, sodium cyanide, and black abaya fabric. Taekwang Industrial's electronic division, Taekwang Eroica, manufactured phones and audio electronics products, including the Eroica brands. However, the electronic division was shut down when Korea's audio market dried up in December 2005.

Taekwang Industrial's 2023 sales are KRW 2.2655 trillion.

== See also ==
- Economy of South Korea
- Taekwang Group
