= Hanmi Semiconductor =

South Korean semiconductor equipment company

Hanmi Semiconductor Co., Ltd.
- Native name: 한미반도체 주식회사
- Type: Public
- Traded as: KRX: 042700
- Industry: Semiconductors
- Founded: 1980; 46 years ago
- Founder: Kwak Noh-kwon
- Headquarters: Incheon, South Korea
- Key people: Kwak Dong Shin (Chairman)
- Website: hanmisemi.com

Hanmi Semiconductor Co., Ltd. (Korean: 한미반도체 주식회사) is a semiconductor equipment manufacturer based in Incheon, South Korea. Hanmi is one of the world’s leading suppliers of semiconductor packaging equipment, proving systems for die cutting, cleaning and testing, grinding, and thermocompression bonding. The company was established by Kwak Noh-kwon in 1980, following his career as an engineer at Motorola.

== Ownership and business activities ==
Kwak Dong Shin holds one third of Hanmi's shares and is the de facto controlling stakeholder. Crescendo Equity Partners, a Korean equity fund co-founded by Peter Thiel and Matt Danzeisen among others, has invested in the company since 2013. This was Crescendo's first Korean investment and Crescendo was also the first Korean company to invest in the semiconductor Hanmi. The relationship between Kwak and Thiel at Hanmi have led to other business activities tied to Hanmi and Crescendo, such as Hanmi's and Kwak's investments in the semiconductor front-end producer HPSP (also backed by Thiel) in 2021; joint investments by Kwak and Thiel into Line Next (a unit of the Line Corporation), a joint venture between Softbank and Naver; the 50 billion won investment in SpaceX by Hanmi in 2026 (made in order to enter cooperation with SpaceX on Terafab).

== Products ==
Hanmi Semiconductor manufactures semiconductor process equipment, including Micro SAW, a chip-packaging cutting machine; Vision Placement, a chip cleaning and testing machine; and Meta Grinder, a grinding machine for VR and AR glasses used in advanced 3D semiconductor packaging. Hanmi also manufactures TC bonders used in HBM production.. It is the top global vendor in the TC bonder for HBM market. It expanded into 2.5D packaging, which is used in AI system semiconductors to integrate GPUs and CPUs, in Septemnber 2026.

In September 2026, it was announced that Hanmi Semiconductor would provide Elon Musk's Terafab with packaging equipment.

Hanmi also develops EMI Shield 2.0 X to serve aerospace, low earth orbit (LEO) satellite and defense drone markets and also for high-performance electric devices (such as smartphones, wearables, and IoT devices). The company is the market leader in EMI shielding equipment for aerospace. EMI shielding protects semiconductors and electronics from malfunctioning by blocking electromagnetic interference generated by other chips.

Hanmi also develops FINTET-based low-power semiconductors.

== Legal disputes ==
As of 2026, Hanmi and Hanhwa Semitech had a legal dispute (with mutual lawsuits) on patent infringement regarding TC bonding equipment used in HBM production, which involves the use of blue light, flux application and squeegee components. The dispute is expected to be resolved by November 2026.

== See also ==
- Semiconductor industry in South Korea
