= Coupang =

South Korean online marketplace

Coupang, Inc.
- Native name: 쿠팡; 庫房
- Type: Public
- Traded as: NYSE: CPNG (Class A); Russell 1000 component
- ISIN: US22266T1097
- Industry: E-commerce; Digital distribution
- Founded: 1 July 2010; 16 years ago in Seoul
- Founder: Bom Kim
- Headquarters: Seattle, Washington, United States.
- Area served: South Korea; Taiwan
- Key people: Harold Rogers (Interim CEO)
- Services: Rocket Delivery (e-commerce); Rocket Fresh (grocery delivery); Coupang Eats (restaurant delivery); Coupang Play (streaming service); Coupang Pay (digital payments)
- Revenue: ▲US$34.5 billion (2025)
- Net income: ▲US$208 million (2025)
- Owners: SoftBank (23.9%); Bom Kim (10.1%)
- Number of employees: c. 95,000 (2024)
- Subsidiaries: Coupang Co., Ltd.; Coupang USA, Inc.; CPLB Corp.; Coupang Pay Corp.; Ddnayo, Inc.; Coupang Fulfillment Services, Ltd.; Coupang Logistics Services, Ltd.
- Website: aboutcoupang.com

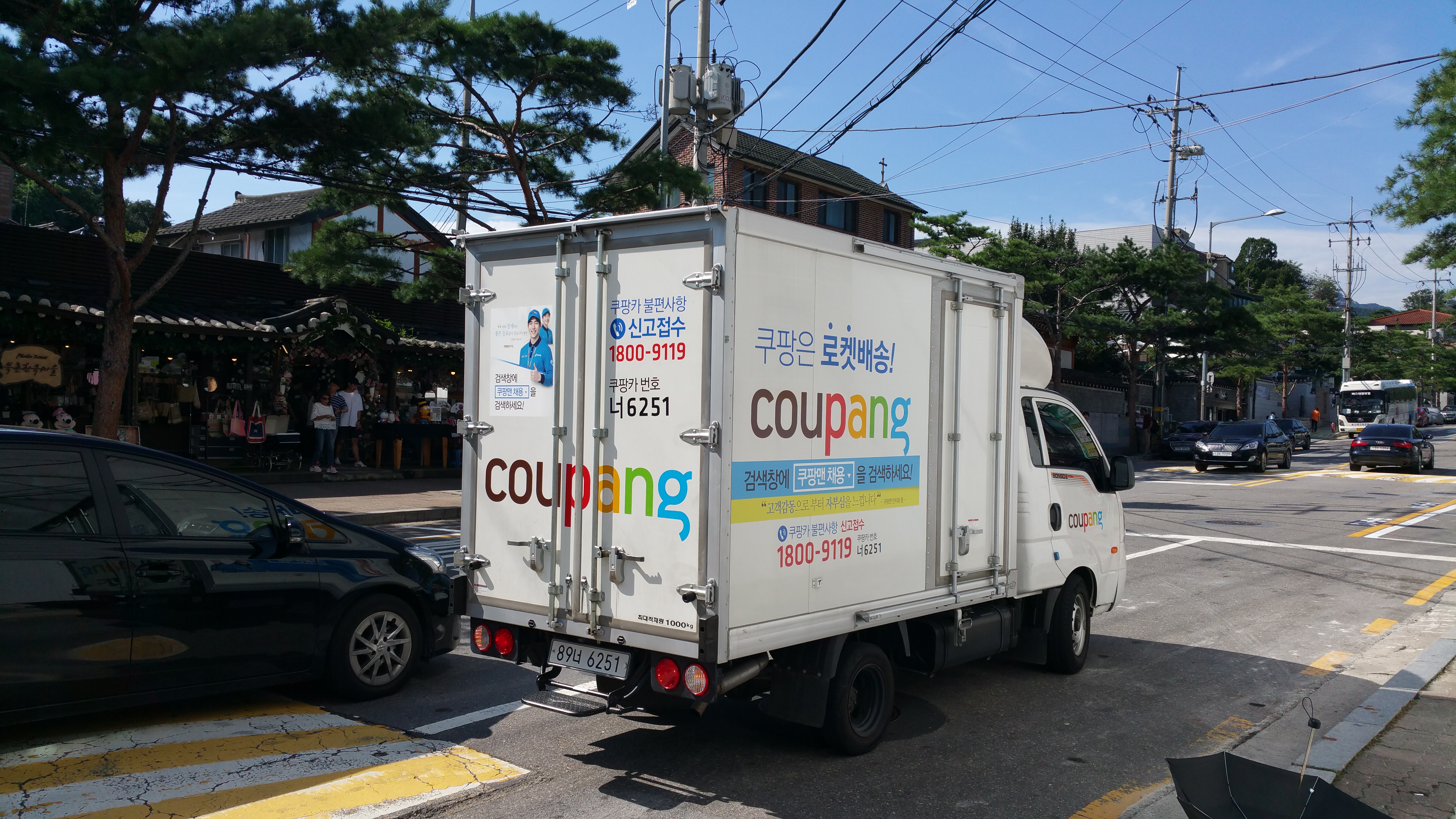
Coupang delivery truck in Seoul

Coupang, Inc. (Korean: 쿠팡; simplified Chinese: 库房; traditional Chinese: 庫房; pinyin: Kùfáng; lit. 'storehouse') is an American online retail and technology company headquartered in Seattle, Washington, operating primarily in South Korea and Taiwan. Founded in South Korea in 2010 by Bom Kim and listed on the Fortune 500 as of 2025, Coupang operates an internet retail business, food delivery service, and OTT streaming service. Originally headquartered in Seoul, South Korea, Coupang has offices in South Korea, Taiwan, the United States, India, Japan and Singapore.

In 2020, the company expanded into video streaming distribution with the launch of its Coupang Play service. Coupang is often referred to as the "Amazon of Korea", due to its position and corporate size in the South Korean online market.

== Overview ==
The largest online retailer in South Korea, Coupang's annual revenue as of 2021 was US$18.4 billion. The company's Rocket Delivery network provides same-day or next-day delivery of more than five million unique items. As of 2018, Coupang claimed that 99.6 percent of its orders were delivered within 24 hours. 70% of Korean citizens lived within 10 minutes of a Coupang logistic center in 2020. The company grew during the COVID-19 pandemic with increased demand for online shopping.

Coupang was headquartered in Songpa District, Seoul, South Korea, until 2022 when it relocated its headquarters to Seattle in the US. The Seattle office originally opened in 2018 and grew to 350 employees within four years. Coupang also has offices in Beijing, Shanghai, Los Angeles and Mountain View. It has been incorporated under the Delaware General Corporation Law since 2010. Coupang was named to the Fortune 200 in 2023 and 2024 and Fortune 150 in 2025.

=== Coupang Taiwan ===
In October 2022, Coupang launched in Taiwan introducing its overnight shipping Rocket Delivery and Rocket Overseas direct overseas purchase. Through Rocket Delivery, customers in Taiwan can order daily necessities and groceries for delivery the following day. If the ordered products come to NT$490 or more, they are delivered free of charge. In addition to the Rocket Delivery service within Taiwan, Coupang has also launched a Rocket Overseas service, allowing Taiwanese consumers to directly purchase goods from the United States and Korea, with free delivery of total purchase of NT$690 or more.

Coupang became the most downloaded app in the second quarter of 2023 in Taiwan. In November 2023, Coupang launched its second logistics center with the third logistics center expected to be in operation in 2024.

== History ==
Coupang was founded by Bom Kim in 2010. A student at Harvard University, Kim started to study for an MBA at Harvard Business School but dropped out six months into the program.

Kim registered Coupang originally as a limited liability company in Delaware, allowing it to access US funding. In November 2018, Coupang received a US$2 billion investment from SoftBank. Other major investors in Coupang include BlackRock and Fidelity.

In July 2020, Coupang acquired the assets of Singaporean streaming service HOOQ to form the nucleus of its streaming service named Coupang Play. Coupang had its IPO on the New York Stock Exchange on 11 March 2021.

On 4 June 2021, Coupang announced that it had started trial operations in Japan. It pulled out of the country less than 2 years later due to low growth potential amid the dominance of Amazon and local player Rakuten. On 8 July 2021, the company launched in Taiwan.

In January 2024, Coupang acquired online retailer Farfetch and its subsidiary Stadium Goods, which serve customers in the United States and globally.

Coupang reentered the Japanese market in January 2025 with Rocket Now, a restaurant prepared food delivery service.

In late 2025, Coupang disclosed a large‑scale data breach affecting the personal information of tens of millions of users, prompting a government investigation that continued into 2026. The ongoing probe led to a drop in orders on the platform, which delivery workers and small business sellers reported as adversely affecting their income and sales.

== Financials ==
For the full year 2025, Coupang reported total net revenues of approximately $34.5 billion, representing 14% year‑over‑year growth. Gross profit increased 15% to $10.1 billion, with gross margins of 29.4%. The company reported net income of $214 million, while adjusted EBITDA reached approximately $1.5 billion.

The company announced in 2020 that its annual revenue in 2019 increased by 64.2 percent over the previous year, and totaled KRW7.15 trillion (US$5.9 billion). Its operating loss in 2019 dropped from KRW1.13 trillion to KRW720.5 billion, declining 36 percent. The gains were attributed to expanded fast delivery service across the nation, including the overnight Rocket Delivery; sales of home appliances and fresh food; and a steady increase in customers. The company had created 2,500 jobs in 2014 and 30,000 in 2019; labor costs increased correspondingly from KRW100 billion in 2014 to KRW1.4 trillion in 2019. In 2020, the COVID-19 pandemic accelerated the company's sales.

According to SoftBank, Coupang's estimated value is US$9 billion, and it has earned US$3.4 billion venture funding to date. SoftBank funded the company with US$2 billion in 2018 and US$1 billion in 2015. Following Coupang's IPO in March 2021, SoftBank owned one-third of the company, Greenoaks Capital had a 16.6% stake, Maverick Holdings 6.4%, and Rose Park Advisors 5.1%. BlackRock held a 2.1% stake and CEO Bom Suk Kim owned approximately 10.2%. Its sales increased 74% in the first quarter of 2021 with US$4.26 billion recorded, compared to the first quarter of 2020. Its year-over-year net loss increased 180% to US$295 million during that same period. Coupang achieved profitability beginning in 2023, when it reported revenue of approximately US$24.4 billion, up 18% year over year, and net income of about US$1.36 billion, supported in part by a one‑time tax benefit.

In 2024, revenue increased to approximately US$30.3 billion. Net income for the year was US$154 million, lower than in 2023 due largely to the absence of the prior year's tax-related benefit Revenue in the second quarter of 2025 was US$8.5 billion, up 16% year-on-year and up 19% on a basis that did not reflect exchange rates. Net profit was US$32 million (about 40 billion won), a significant improvement from a deficit of US$77 million a year earlier, and succeeded in turning into a surplus.

Years	In US$ Millions		
Years	Revenue	Gross income	Net income
2018	4,054	189	−1,098
2019	6,273	1,033	−699
2020	11,967	1,986	−463
2021	18,406	3,109	−1,543
2022	20,583	4,710	−92
2023	24,383	6,190	1,360
2024	30,628	8,831	154
2025	34,500	10,100	214

=== Trade Investigations ===
In February 2026, the House Judiciary Committee opened a formal investigation into South Korean regulators for potential discrimination against American technology companies operating in South Korea. The committee subpoenaed Coupang for documents and testimony as a US-based technology company related to South Korean regulatory actions pertaining to a data breach that committee lawmakers are concerned with "punitive obligations, excessive fines, and discriminatory enforcement practices in ways that could benefit domestic competitors."

U.S.-based investment firms Greenoaks Capital Partners and Altimeter Capital, which together hold approximately $1.5 billion in Coupang shares, petitioned the United States Trade Representative (USTR) to initiate a Section 301 investigation into the South Korean government. The investors alleged that Seoul engaged in unfair and discriminatory treatment of Coupang following the cybersecurity breach and characterized the government investigations as punitive and harmful to U.S. commercial interests. The investors also accused the Lee Jae-myung government of taking an "increasingly anti-U.S., pro-China stance" and indicated plans to pursue international arbitration claims against South Korea.

In March 2026, the petition was withdrawn as U.S. officials indicated a broader investigation into South Korea's trade practices related to American companies.

== Services ==
=== Rocket Delivery ===
Coupang is known for its fast delivery system. Rocket Delivery is a signature service whereby items ordered before midnight will be delivered overnight by Coupang's own delivery personnel. In July 2020, Coupang's Rocket Delivery staff was renamed from Coupangman to Coupangfriend (쿠팡친구), since the number of female delivery workers has increased, and to imply friendly service.

Rocket Delivery service is free for the Coupang Rocket membership subscribers, for whom delivery is free for all Rocket Delivery tagged products. Rocket Delivery is offered to non-subscribers if they purchase more than KRW4,990. It is estimated that 32% of Coupang users are subscribed. 99.3% of Coupang Rocket Delivery orders are delivered within one day.

Rocket Delivery service is possible via 200 warehouses that are approximately 1.9 million m^{2} (20 million sq ft) across the country. Coupang's logistic centers store approximately 5.3 million types of products and they are stored by an efficient storage system called Random Stow Algorithm. About 1.7 million Rocket Delivery products are sent out from the logistic centers on a daily basis.

=== Rocket Wow ===
Rocket Wow, a paid subscription service, similar to Amazon Prime, costs users KRW2,900 per month. On 30 December 2021, Coupang adjusted the membership fee to KRW4,990 per month. The increased subscription service has applied to new subscribers.

The features of Rocket Wow are:

- Free delivery for entire Rocket Delivery tagged products
- Free return within 30 days
- Discounts on Rocket Wow tagged products
- One-day delivery
- Receiving Rocket Fresh products in the morning
- Use of Coupang Play

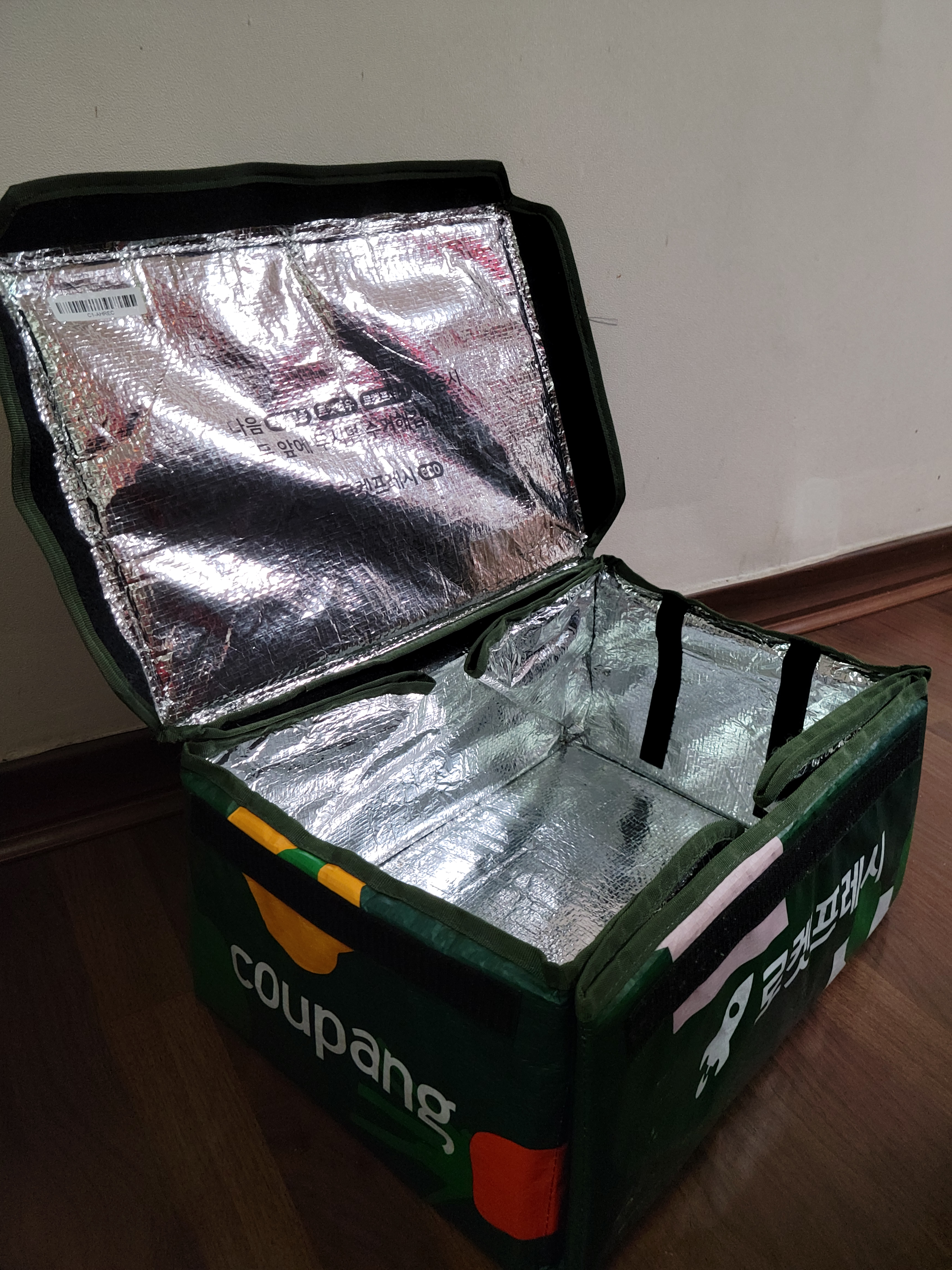
Coupang Rocket Fresh Eco Bag

=== Rocket Fresh ===
Rocket Fresh is a fresh-food delivery service. Similar to Rocket Delivery, Rocket Fresh delivers fresh foods overnight. Users can receive the food by 7am if they order before midnight. The service covers up to 8,500 kinds of foods.

When Rocket Wow subscribers are ordering Rocket Fresh, they can choose the delivery option of Rocket Fresh Eco, which is an option to deliver the foods inside a reusable fresh eco-bag instead of a paper box. The bag preserves the foods in a fresh condition, and is re-collected in the customer's next delivery.

=== Rocket Direct Purchasing of foreign goods ===
Users can purchase foreign goods through Coupang. Rocket Direct Purchasing allows foreign goods to be delivered within 3 days.

=== Coupang Eats ===
Coupang Eats is a food-delivery service like Uber Eats. Coupang users can order food from restaurants, with delivery by Coupang which can be tracked in real time. According to the "Delivery Service Trend Report 2021" released by market research company Open Survey, delivery-service app usage was topped by Baemin (88.6%), Yogiyo (68.2%), and Coupang Eats (34.7%). Compared to the previous year, Baemin rose 8.9 percent, Yogiyo fell 0.1 percent and Coupang Eats rose 28.6 percent. Coupang Eats' growth year-on-year was also noticeable in the recognition survey of each app. Baemin increased 2.4 percentage points from 93.4 percent last year to 95.8 percent this year, Yogiyo remained 90 percent, and Coupang Eats jumped 49.1 percentage points from 23.3 percent to 72.4 percent. Baedaltong fell from 62.7 percent to 55.5 percent. Coupang Eats topped the list with 74 percent for satisfaction with delivery apps.

=== Coupang Flex ===
Coupang Flex is an outsourcing service that provides temporary employment to anyone over 18 years old. People can choose the date they wish to work and their main work is delivery. Those who have cars can pick up the packages from Coupang's logistic centers and deliver by themselves. Those who do not have cars assist the Coupang man. Coupang flex users are paid KRW800 per package during the day and KRW1200 per package during the night. On average, they tend to deliver 50 to 60 packages per day.

=== Coupang Play ===
Coupang Play is a South Korean subscription-based video streaming service launched by Coupang in December 2020.

=== Coupang Pay ===
Coupang Pay is a digital payments service that enables customers to make easy payments. In mid 2020, the company spun off Coupang Pay as a separate fintech subsidiary. By the end of 2020, Coupang Pay was the second most widely used pay system in Korea, with settlement turnover of KRW 25 trillion.

=== Farfetch ===
Farfetch is a marketplace for the luxury fashion industry. The Farfetch connects customers in over 190 countries and territories with items from more than 50 countries and over 1,400 of the world's brands, boutiques, and department stores. Farfetch was acquired by Coupang in January 2024.

== Controversy ==
=== Worker wellbeing ===
Coupang has been involved in complaints by activists and families of workers, who allegedly died from overwork. In April 2021 Kwon Young-gook, a lawyer and the co-chairman at the Committee for Coupang Workers' Human Rights and Health, said "Seven Coupang employees and two subcontractors have died of cardiovascular disorders, such as heart attack, for the past year. [...] Out of the nine deaths, five are connected to overnight work as they passed away during or after night duty." According to statistics published in the Korea Economic Daily, Coupang had recorded no work-accident deaths since its launch in 2011, as of the end of 2020. In April 2021, the company introduced Coupang Care, a system that allows employees to take paid breaks and receive health care coaching.

In November 2025 the Korea Times reported that workplace deaths were becoming a persistent issue at Coupang and that since 2020 twenty-seven Coupang workers have died whilst at work according to the Taekbae Union which represents couriers. They note that before Coupang Inc. was listed on the NYSE in 2021, Coupang founder Bom Kim resigned from all registered titles relating to Coupang Corp. thus severing himself from any legal liability related to his registered executive positions in Korea whilst still holding over 70 percent of voting rights in Coupang Inc. and retaining influence over the company's affairs.

=== Item Winner system ===
There is a debate over Coupang's Item Winner system, which selects the cheapest product among the same products as the sole seller. There is criticism that sellers offering items for as low as one won can monopolize the market. According to Coupang's terms and conditions, this right is delegated to Coupang as soon as the product's image and trademark are posted. In the process, problems can arise because sellers can use other sellers' images, via Coupang's copyright-transfer agreements. In May 2021, the situation was reported to be under review by the Fair Trade Commission.

=== Cybersecurity breach ===
In 2025, it was revealed that a former Coupang employee stole a data key that enabled unauthorized access to 33.7 million Coupang customers’ data between June and November of that year. Coupang states that the data of between 2,609 and 3,000 accounts was taken and accessed several times, accounting for the 33.7 million. The South Korean government investigations team confirmed there was no secondary damage from the breach.

This breach prompted an investigation by the South Korean government and an apology by the company. Following the breach, CEO Park Dae-jun resigned in December 2025. Harold Rogers was named interim CEO. Rogers is Chief Administrative Officer and General Counsel of Coupang Inc., the company's U.S.-based parent company. After the breach, the South Korean authorities launched a coordinated "whole-of-government" response including labor, financial and customs investigations. Police raided the company's Seoul headquarters, tax authorities launched a special audit, and parliament summoned executives, including founder Bom Kim for questioning, to which the latter declined to attend.

The South Korean government's actions led to meetings between Vice President JD Vance and South Korean Prime Minister Kim Min-seok where Vance warned the Prime Minister against penalizing Coupang and other U.S. technology companies operating in South Korea through unfair and discriminatory regulations and investigations.

In January 2026, President Donald Trump announced tariffs on various South Korean goods, with U.S. Representative Jim Jordan, Chairman of the House Judiciary Committee, citing the treatment of Coupang as one of the reasons for the tariffs.

=== 2026 Incheon warehouse fire ===
On July 18, 2026, a fire broke out at a Coupang logistics center in Seo-gu, Incheon, at approximately 6:54 a.m. local time. Firefighting efforts continued for more than two hours, with the Incheon Fire Department deploying 148 personnel and 59 pieces of equipment, including pump trucks, to extinguish the blaze. Authorities said the exact cause of the fire and the extent of any casualties or property damage would be investigated once the fire was fully extinguished. The fire was brought under control around 8 p.m. on July 20. It was around 61 hours after the fire broke out.

=== Food delivery market practices ===
In November 2026, South Korea's Fair Trade Commission fined Coupang 300.9 billion won ($220.59 million) for abusing its dominant position in the food delivery market. The regulator said that Coupang had required restaurants using its delivery platform, Coupang Eats, to match favourable terms offered on rival platforms, including menu prices, minimum order amounts, discounts and delivery charges. The FTC said that restaurants that failed to comply risked losing access to promotional benefits offered to customers with paid memberships. Coupang disputed the findings, describing the penalty as excessive and saying that it would challenge the decision through legal proceedings.
