= Upbit =

South Korean cryptocurrency exchange

- Founded: 2017
- Headquarters: Seoul, South Korea
- Products: Cryptocurrency exchange
- Parent: Dunamu Inc.
- Website: www.upbit.com

Upbit is a South Korean cryptocurrency exchange founded in 2017. It is operated by Dunamu, which is one of the highest-valued startups in South Korea.

== History ==
Upbit launched in South Korea on October 24, 2017, with the help of its partnership with American cryptocurrency exchange Bittrex.

Sirgoo Lee was named CEO of Dunamu, Upbit's parent company, on December 21, 2017, with Dunamu founder and CEO Chi-hyung Song assuming the role of chairman. Lee previously served as Co-CEO of Kakao Corp. and JOINS, Inc.

Approximately two months after its launch, Upbit became the top global cryptocurrency exchange in terms of 24-hour trading volume.

On May 10, 2018, its main office was raided as part of a fraud probe.

The exchange began expanding into Southeast Asia in late 2018, first by launching in Singapore on October 30, and then beginning services in Indonesia starting January 2019, and Thailand starting January 2021.

On December 21, 2018, three Upbit officials were indicted for allegedly making fake orders. The exchange denied the allegations.

In December 2018, Upbit became the first cryptocurrency exchange in the world to receive certifications from the Korea Internet and Security Agency for Information Security Management System (ISMS) and the International Organization for Standardization (ISO) for information security (ISO 27001), cloud security (ISO 27017), and cloud privacy (ISO 27018).

On November 27, 2019, Upbit lost about US$48.5 million worth of Ethereum from a hack.

In September 2021, South Korea started to regulate virtual asset service providers. Upbit was the first cryptocurrency exchange to be licensed under the new regulations.

In November 2025, Naver Financial announced its plan to acquire Dunamu, the parent company of Upbit,

== 2019 hacking incident ==
In November 2019, Upbit was hacked, resulting in the theft of 342,000 Ethereum tokens (valued at approximately 58 billion won at the time). This incident caused a two-week suspension of cryptocurrency deposits and withdrawals. On November 21, 2024, the National Office of Investigation of the National Police Agency announced that following a five-year investigation, the attack was determined to be the work of the North Korean state-sponsored hacking organizations "Lazarus" and "Andariel." This marks the first officially confirmed instance of a North Korean cyberattack targeting a domestic cryptocurrency exchange.

More than half of the stolen virtual assets were swapped into Bitcoin via three cryptocurrency exchange websites, while the remainder was laundered through distributed transfers to 51 overseas exchanges across 13 countries. In October 2023, the police recovered 4.8 Bitcoins (valued at approximately 600 million won) stored in a Swiss exchange, initiating the asset recovery process.
