= New Bhuj =

- town
- Location in Gujarat, India New Bhuj (India)
- Coordinates: 23°16′0″N 69°40′0″E
- Country: India
- State: Gujarat
- District: Kachch
- Elevation: 109 m (358 ft)
- Time zone: UTC+5:30 (IST)
- Vehicle registration: GJ- 12
- Coastline: 0 kilometres (0 mi)
- Website: gujaratindia.com

New Bhuj is a town Kachchh District of Gujarat, India.

== Transport ==
It is served by a broad gauge branchline of the national railway network.

A metre gauge line used to go to Naliya.

== See also ==
- Railway stations in India
