= Taekwang Group =

South Korean conglomerate

- Type: Public, (traded on the Korea Stock Exchange
- Founded: 1950; 76 years ago

- Taekwang Group
- Hangul: 태광그룹
- RR: Taegwang geurup
- MR: T'aegwang kŭrup

Taekwang Group is a large South Korean chaebol (conglomerate), producing clothing, apparel, chemical, industry, and financial services products.

== Subsidiaries ==
- Taekwang Industrial
- Taekwang Synthetic Fiber (ChangShu, China)
- Taekwang Swimwear fabric factory (ChangShu, China)
- Daehan Synthetic Fiber
- Heungkuk Fire & Marine Insurance
- Heungkuk Life Insurance
  - Incheon Heungkuk Life Pink Spiders
- Goryo Mutual Savings Bank
- Yegaram Mutual Savings Bank
- Heungkuk Investment & Financial Services
- Heungkuk Securities (original see Fides)
- Taekwang Tour Development
- ~~T-broad~~(T-Broad was acquired by SK Broadband in April 2020.)
- T-cast
- KDMC*
- tsis
- Korea Book Promotions
- Iljoo Academy
- Iljoo Academy & Culture Foundation
- Sehwa Academy & Culture Foundation

== See also ==
- Economy of South Korea
- List of South Korean companies
