= Develon =

South African retail company

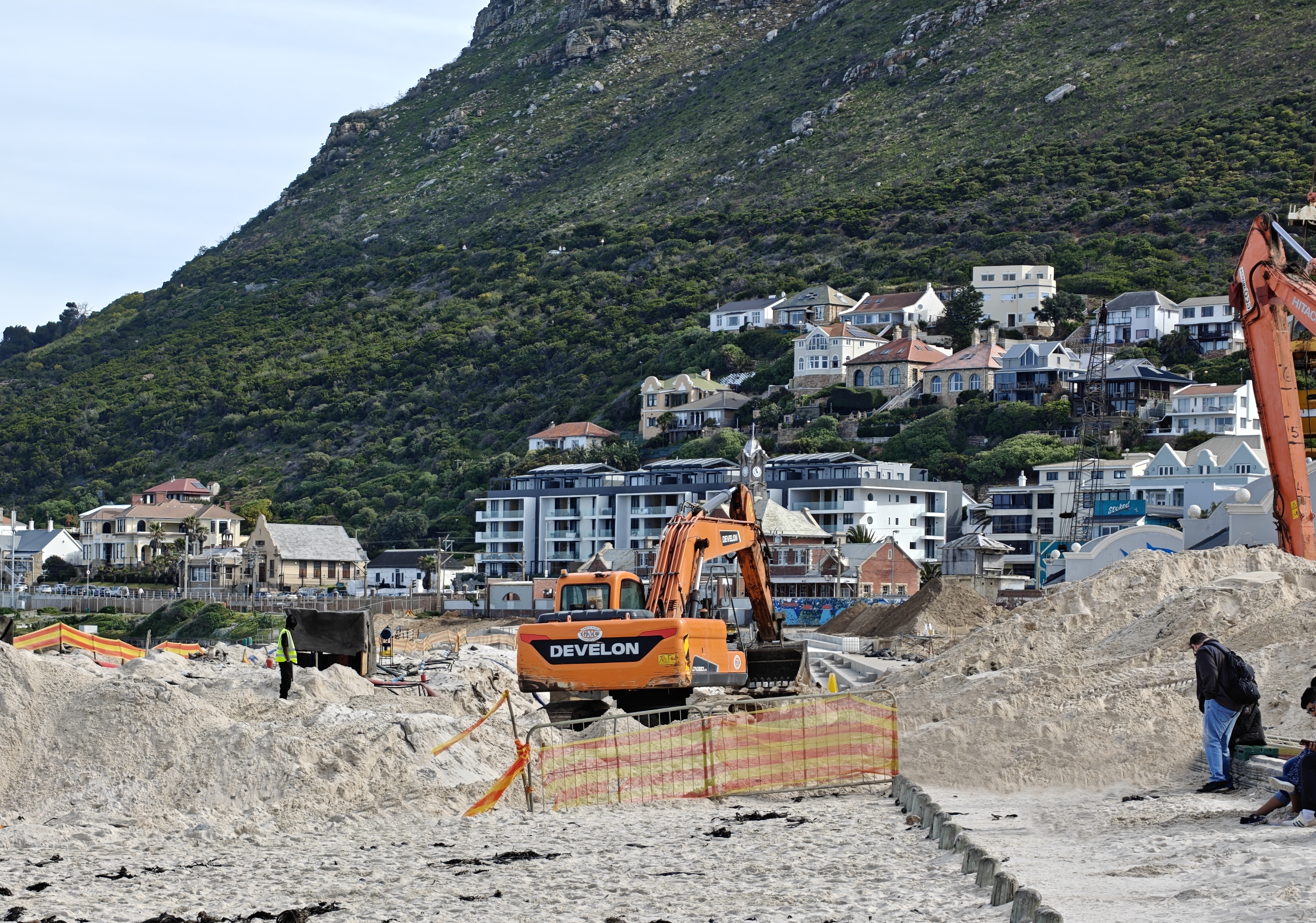
- Develon excavator at Muizenberg Beach, in Cape Town
- Product type: Construction equipment
- Current owner: HD Construction Equipment
- Produced by: HD Construction Equipment
- Country: South Korea
- Introduced: 2023; 3 years ago
- Related brands: Hyundai
- Markets: Worldwide
- Registered as a trademark in: International Registration No. 1774335 (2023)
- Tagline: Powered by Innovation
- Website: develon-ce.com

Develon, stylized as DEVELON, is a brand of construction equipment manufactured by South Korean company HD Construction Equipment, which itself is a subsidiary of conglomerate HD Hyundai.

The company produces a variety of machienery, including excavators, wheel loaders, articulated dump trucks, motor graders, road builders, and compact truck loaders.

Develon traces its history back to the 1937 establishment of Chosun Machine Works, the predecessor to HD Hyundai Infracore. The brand was previously known as Doosan.

== History ==
Develon was established in January 2023, when Hyundai Doosan Infracore rebranded Doosan equipment into Develon. The tagline, nomenclature (DL/DX/DA), and orange body color for the brand's products remained. The name is a portmanteau of the words develop and onwards.

At the launch event for the new brand name, it was confirmed that both Develon and Hyundai would continue to operate and compete against one another, as distinct brands of construction equipment owned by the same parent company.

== Models ==
As of 2026, Develon produces construction equipment including:

- DX line of tracked excavators
- SD and DL lines of front end loaders and wheel loaders
- DA line of articulated dump trucks
- DX line of wheel excavators
- DTL line of compact truck loaders
- DX line of mini excavators
- Vehicles for various specialist applications
- Construction equipment attachments

== See also ==
- HD Construction Equipment
- HD Hyundai
