= HD Construction Equipment =

South Korean construction equipment company

HD Construction Equipment (HDCE)
- Native name: 에이치디건설기계 주식회사
- Formerly: HD Hyundai Construction Equipment
- Type: Public
- Traded as: KRX: 267270
- ISIN: KR7267270007
- Industry: Heavy equipment
- Predecessor: Hyundai Heavy Industries
- Founded: 4 March 2017; 9 years ago
- Headquarters: Seongnam, South Korea
- Area served: Worldwide
- Key people: Moon Jae-young (CEO)
- Products: Construction equipment Engines
- Production output: ~50,000 units per year (2024)
- Brands: Develon; Hyundai
- Services: Aftermarket services and maintenance Parts; Fleet management Training
- Parent: HD Hyundai
- Website: hd-ce.com

HD Construction Equipment Co., Ltd. (HDCE; Korean: 에이치디건설기계 주식회사), formerly Hyundai Construction Equipment, is a South Korean construction equipment manufacturer, and subsidiary of the HD Hyundai conglomerate.

The company is the largest construction machinery company in Korea, and was formed through the merger of Doosan Infracore and Hyundai Construction Equipment. HDCE markets its products under two brands; Develon and Hyundai.

== History ==
HD Construction Equipment was established in 1985 as a construction equipment division of Hyundai Heavy Industries, a shipbuilding company, based in Ulsan. In 2017, Hyundai Heavy Industries spun off its non-shipbuilding businesses, including electronics, robotics, and construction equipment, to enhance their competitiveness. As a result, Hyundai Construction Equipment was established as a separate company.

Following the parent group's rebranding in 2023, Hyundai Construction Equipment was renamed HD Hyundai Construction Equipment.

In 2021, HCE's parent company acquired Doosan Infracore, which later became HD Hyundai Infracore, its largest domestic rival.

In 2026, the two construction companies within the same corporate group merged to form HD Construction Equipment. Despite the merger, the company continues to market products under both the Develon brand, inherited from HD Hyundai Infracore, and the Hyundai brand from HD Hyundai Construction Equipment. The merged company operates manufacturing facilities in Ulsan, Incheon, and Gunsan in South Korea and in India, China, Brazil, and Norway.

== Subsidiaries ==
As of 2026, HDCE's subsidiaries include:

| Subsidiary | Country of operation | Shareholding | Year established | Ref. |
|---|---|---|---|---|
| HD Construction Equipment Hyundai North America Inc. | United States | 100% | 1991; 35 years ago | |
| HD Construction Equipment Hyundai Europe N.V. | Belgium | 100% | 1990; 36 years ago | |
| HD Hyundai (China) Investment Co., Ltd. | China | 100% | 2006; 20 years ago | |
| HD Hyundai Infracore (China) Investment Co., Ltd. | China | 100% | 2006; 20 years ago | |
| HD Hyundai Infracore China Co., Ltd. | China | 100% | 1994; 32 years ago | |
| HD Construction Equipment Develon North America LLC | United States | 100% | 2016; 10 years ago | |
| HD Construction Equipment Norway AS | Norway | 100% | 2003; 23 years ago | |
| HD Hyundai Infracore Engine (Tianjin) Co., Ltd. | China | 100% | 2018; 8 years ago | |
| HD Hyundai Infracore Deutschland GmbH | Germany | 100% | 2022; 4 years ago | |
| HD CE Africa Ltd. | Ghana | 100% | 2025; 1 year ago | |
| HD Construction Equipment Develon Europe s.r.o. | Czech Republic | 100% | 2019; 7 years ago | |
| HD CONSTRUCTION EQUIPMENT BRASIL – Industria e Comercio de Equipamentos de Construcao S.A. | Brazil | 99.99% | 2011; 15 years ago | |
| HD Hyundai Construction Equipment India Private Ltd. | India | 99.99% | 2007; 19 years ago | |
| HD Hyundai Infracore India Private Ltd. | India | 99.99% | 2015; 11 years ago | |
| HD Hyundai Infracore Chile S.A. | Chile | 99.99% | 2007; 19 years ago | |
| HD Hyundai Infracore South America IND.E Com. DE | Brazil | 99.99% | 2007; 19 years ago | |
| HD CONSTRUCTION EQUIPMENT MEXICO S. de R.L. de C.V. | Mexico | 99.90% | 2024; 2 years ago | |
| HD Hyundai (China) Investment Co., Ltd. | China | 100% | 2006; 20 years ago | |
| HD HYUNDAI (SHANGHAI) FINANCIAL LEASING CO., Ltd. | China | 58.74% | 2007; 19 years ago | |
| Hyundai Jiangsu Construction Machinery Co., Ltd. | China | 60% | | |
| PT HD Hyundai Construction Equipment Indonesia | Indonesia | 69.97% | | |
| PT HD Construction Equipment Develon Indonesia | Indonesia | 99.99% | 2023; 3 years ago | |
| Clue Insights Inc. | United States | 71.45% | 2019; 7 years ago | |
