= HD Hyundai Infracore =

South Korean manufacturing company

HD Hyundai Infracore Co., Ltd.
- Native name: 에이치디현대인프라코어 주식회사
- Formerly: Daewoo Heavy Industries; Daewoo Heavy Industries & Machinery; Doosan Infracore
- Type: Public
- Traded as: KRX: 042670
- Industry: Defense; Heavy equipment
- Founded: 2000; 26 years ago as Daewoo Heavy Industries & Machinery
- Defunct: January 1, 2026
- Fate: Merged with HD Construction Equipment
- Headquarters: 489, Injung-ro, Dong-gu, Incheon, South Korea
- Area served: Worldwide
- Key people: Cho Yeong-cheul (Co-CEO); Oh Seung-hyeon (Co-CEO)
- Products: Heavy equipment; Commercial and military engines
- Revenue: ▲ ₩4.69 trillion (2023)
- Operating income: ▲ ₩418.26 billion (2023)
- Net income: ▼ ₩230.71 billion (2023)
- Total assets: ▼ ₩4.42 trillion (2023)
- Total equity: ▲ ₩1.81 trillion (2023)
- Parent: HD Hyundai
- Website: Official website in Korean; Official website in English

HD Hyundai Infracore Co., Ltd. (Korean: 에이치디현대인프라코어; RR: Eichidi Hyeondae Inpeulakoeo), formerly known as Doosan Infracore, was a South Korean company that manufactures construction equipment and commercial and military engines. It was one of the largest construction equipment manufacturers by sales revenue.

Doosan Infracore was acquired by HD Hyundai (former Hyundai Heavy Industries Group) in 2021. The brand name Develon (디벨론) has been used since 2023.

In January 2026, the company was merged into Hyundai's existing HD Construction Equipment company.

== History ==
=== Daewoo Heavy Industries ===
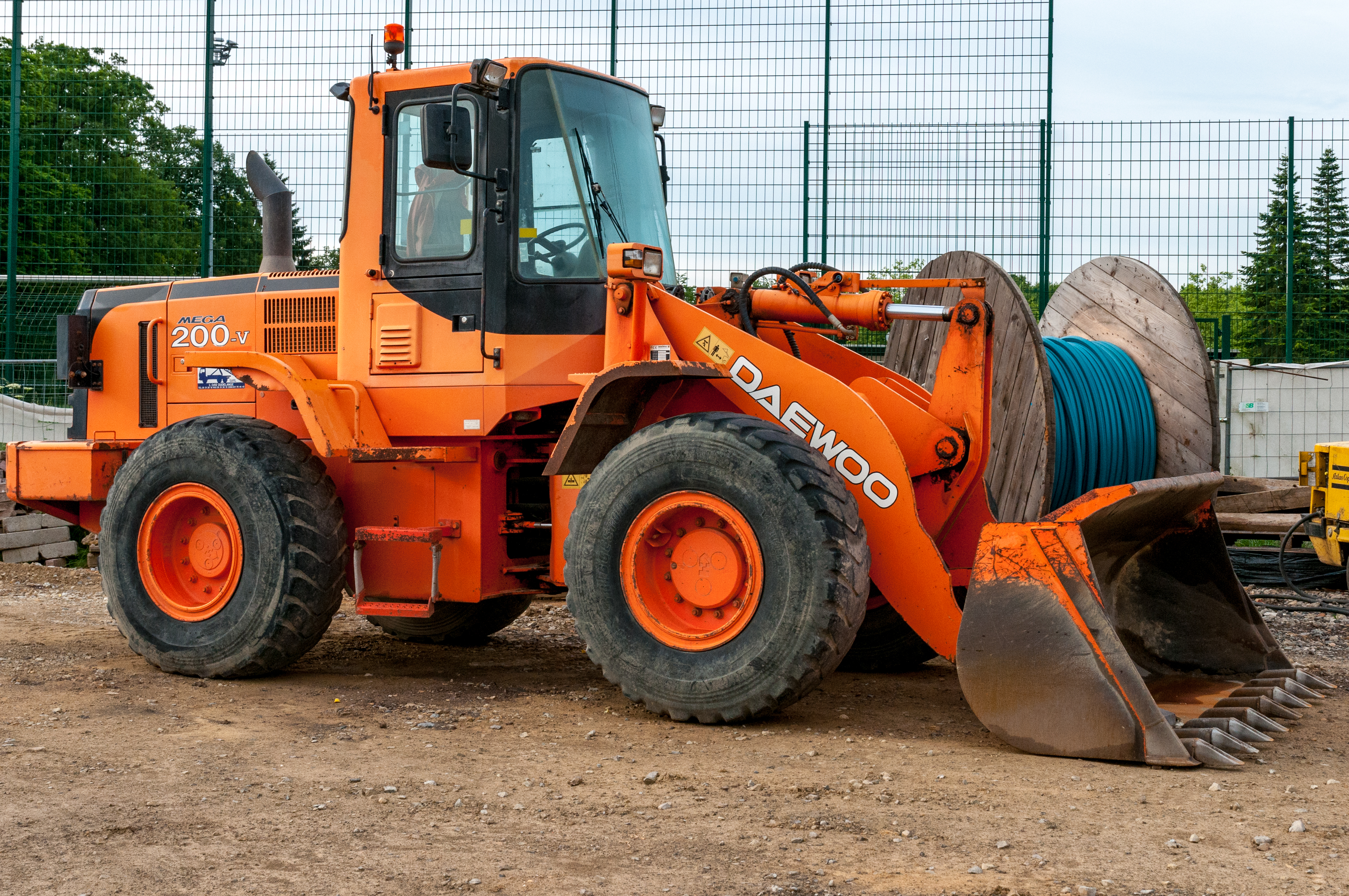
A Daewoo Heavy loader

Daewoo Heavy Industries was founded in 1937 as Chosun Machine Works when Korea was under Japanese rule. After Japan's withdrawal from Korea, the company was nationalized by the government and was transformed into a public company in 1963 as Hankook Machine Industrial. In 1969, Hankook Machine was privatized after being sold to Shinjin Group. In 1975, the company began producing diesel engines with financial support from the German government and technical collaboration with MAN SE.

However, the company was financially strapped due to the lack of domestic demand and unstable direction, and Shinjin had to sell the company back to a government-controlled bank. Then, in 1976, Daewoo Industrial and its affiliates purchased a 44.8% stake in the total share and changed the name to Daewoo Heavy Industries.

=== Doosan Infracore ===
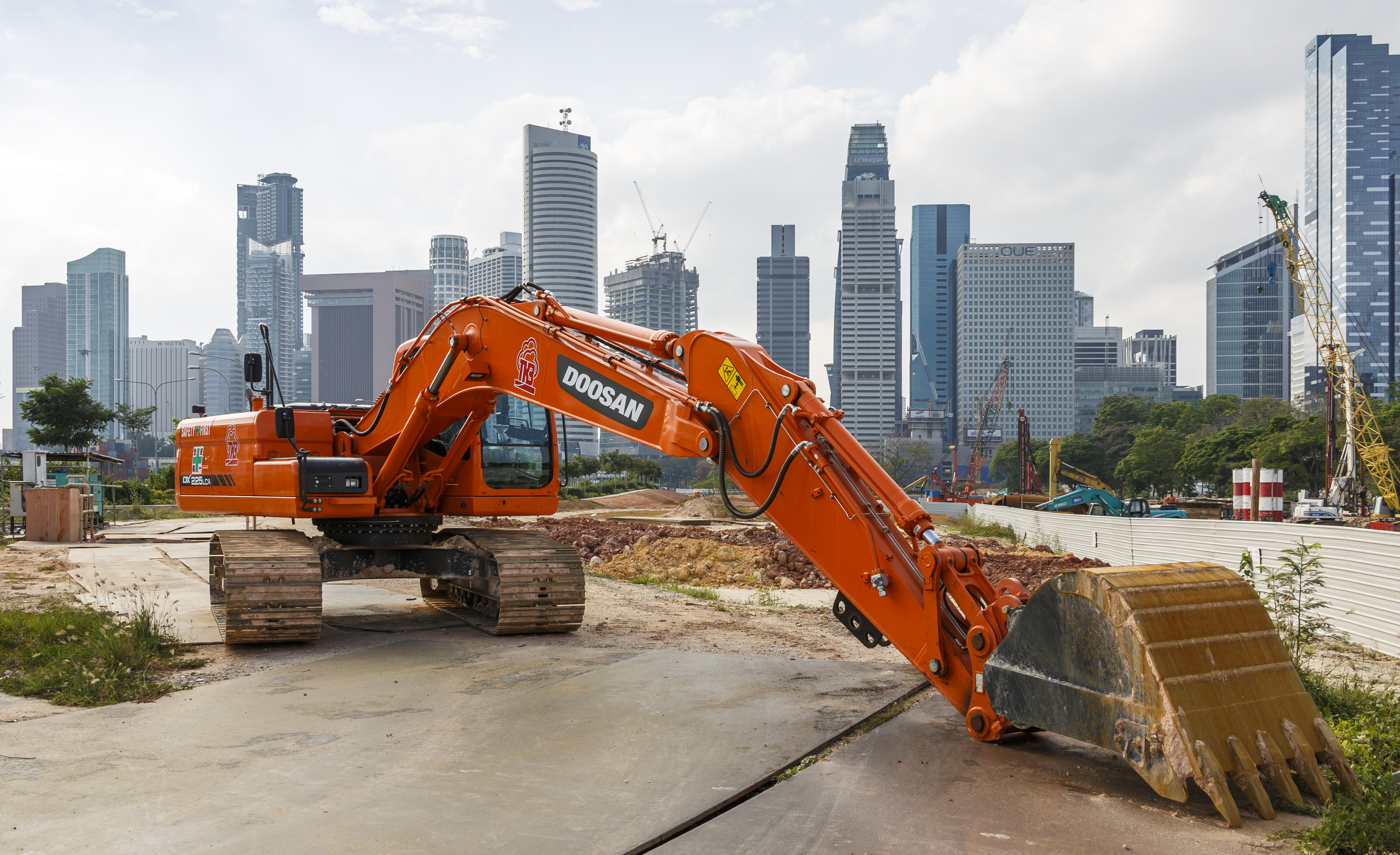
A Doosan Infracore excavator

During the 1997 Asian financial crisis, Daewoo collapsed, and its affiliates were sold to other companies. Daewoo Heavy's shareholders first approved separating the firm's shipbuilding and machinery operations into stand-alone companies, Daewoo Shipbuilding & Marine Engineering and Daewoo Heavy Industries & Machinery. In 2005, Korea Development Bank and Korea Asset Management Corporation chose a consortium led by Doosan Heavy Industries as a prime bidder for Daewoo Heavy and officially signed a contract. After the acquisition, Daewoo Heavy was renamed Doosan Infracore.

Doosan Infracore expanded the heavy equipment business by acquiring global players. In March 2007, the company acquired Yantai Yuhua Machinery, a wheel loader maker, for 22 million yuan. Doosan recorded South Korea's largest international acquisition by purchasing Bobcat and other construction equipment units from Ingersoll Rand for $4.9 billion in November 2007. Doosan's European subsidiary took over Norwegian dump trucks firm Moxy Engineering for €55 million in 2008.

=== HD Hyundai Infracore ===
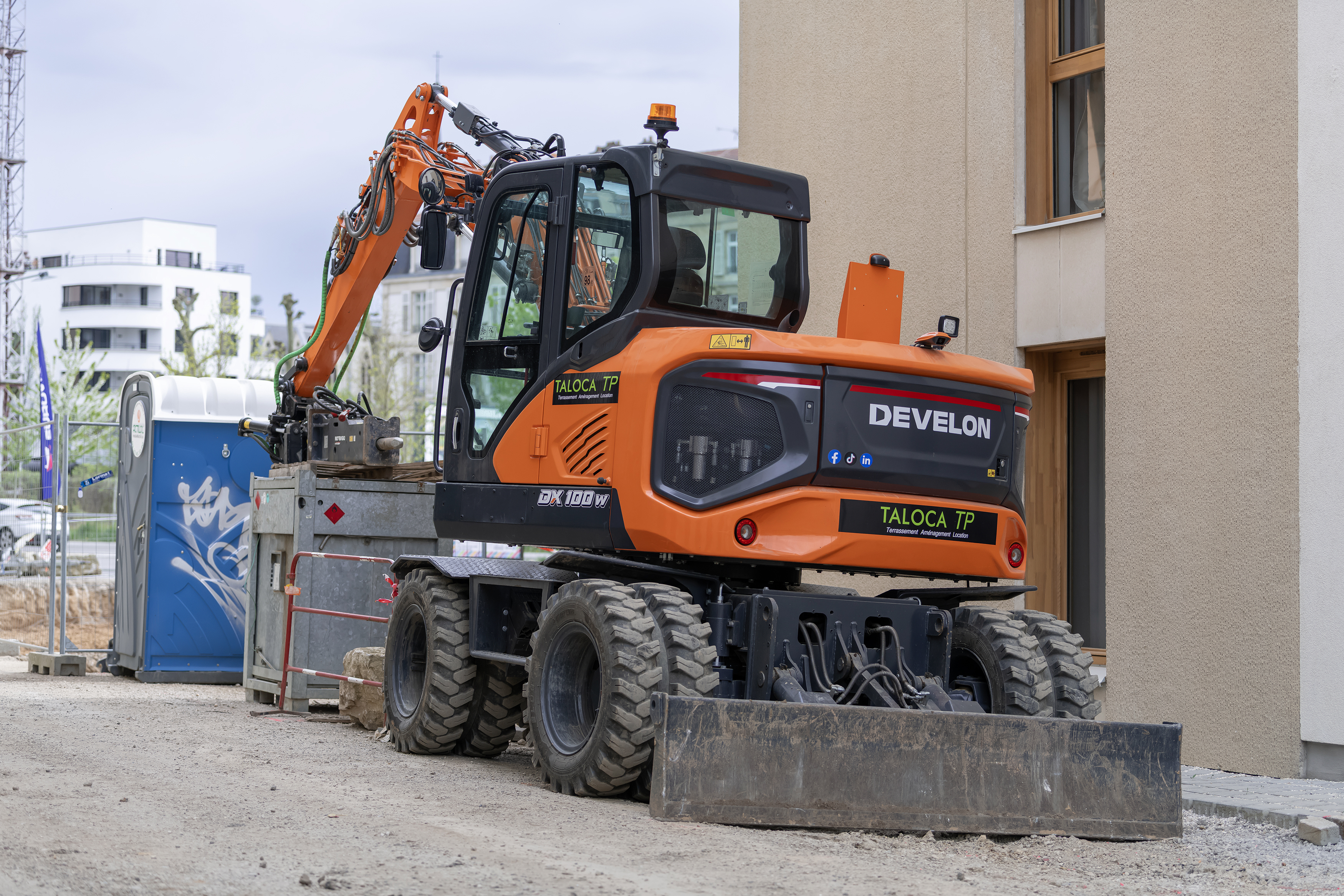
A Develon excavator

Alike Daewoo in 1997, Doosan Group also faced a liquidity crisis due to years of declining orders amid an economic slowdown. Doosan decided to sell a stake held by Doosan Heavy in Doosan Infracore to improve its financial structure. In 2021, Hyundai Heavy Industries Group purchased a 35 percent stake in Doosan Infracore for 850 billion won. However, Doosan Infracore's 51 percent stake in Doosan Bobcat was not included as part of the sale.

In 2023, Hyundai Doosan Infracore changed its brand name to Develon, and adopted the new corporate name HD Hyundai Infracore. The name change was in line with parent company Hyundai Heavy Industries' rebranding to HD Hyundai. In 2026, HD Hyundai Infracore merged with HD Hyundai Construction Equipment, another construction machinery unit under HD Hyundai.

== See also ==
- Defense industry of South Korea
- Daewoo dissolution and corruption scandal
