= Marais (company) =

- Type: Private
- Industry: Heavy equipment
- Founded: 1962
- Founder: Jacques Marais
- Headquarters: Durtal, France
- Area served: Worldwide
- Key people: Etienne Dugas (CEO)
- Products: Trencher (machine)
- Subsidiaries: Marais Contracting Services, Marais Trenching, Marais-Lucas Technologies, Marais Tunisia, Marais Algeria
- Website: samarais.com

Marais or Groupe Marais, founded in 1962 in France, is a manufacturer of trenchers. The head office and workshop buildings have been located in Durtal since 2001. Marais society via its founder, Jacques Marais is in 1962 behind the trenching wheel and the mechanized laying of cables or flexible pipes process.

At present, MARAIS line includes mainly wheel trenchers, chain trenchers, and micro trenchers.

== History ==
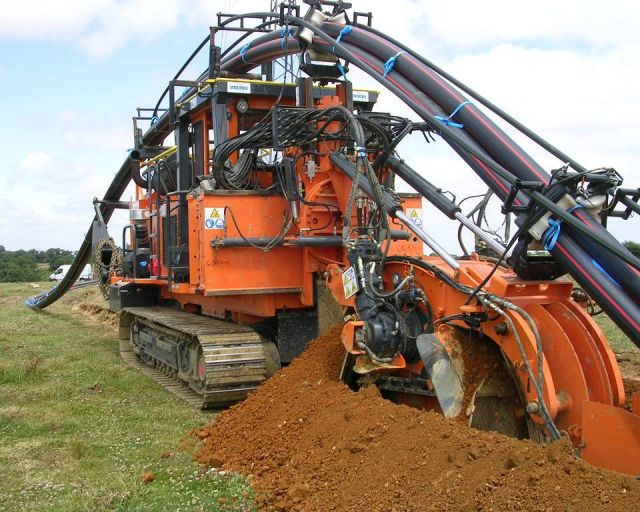
Mechanical laying with a Marais wheel trencher

Created in 1962, Mr. Marais, a contractor located in the Sarthe French department, obtained a patent for a cutting wheel designed for drainage system (agriculture): that is the beginning of the wheel trencher.

1974, the administration of Postes et Télécommunications chose to bury 40,000 km of networks. The company invented the lateral translation of the wheel and the laying box to facilitate work on the verge of the road.

Between 1974 and 1993, several trenchers were built and leased to civil engineering companies to bury cables and Telecommunications networks, electricity, gas and water.

1995, the company investigated new markets abroad: Morocco, Algeria, Senegal, Colombia, Mexico, United States, Canada, which will soon represent 30% of its turnover.

2000, Marais developed a patented micro-trencher named CLEANFAST for optical fiber cable laying in urban areas.

2001, by building the 12 000 km LDCOM network, now 9 telecom, the company acquired the skill and experience of a turnkey network solutions manufacturer.

2005, Marais company established its first subsidiary in Morocco "Marais Morocco".

2006, it is the European leader of mechanized laying in the field of power networks, telecommunications and water and gas supply burying.

2008, the policy of the company is to develop new machines in the field of micro trenching with the Side Cut for the FTTx market.

2009, creation of a joint venture Marais-Lucas Technologies in Sydney (Australia).

2009, acquisition of the Marais company by Qualium Inverstissement (Caisse des dépôts et consignations) and Ouest Croissance (Groupe Banque Populaire), and Etienne Dugas succeeds to Daniel Rivard as the presidency of the Marais Group.

== Marais Group ==
Marais or Groupe Marais manufactures trenchers for both rural and urban areas. The Marais Group is constituted of 5 entities:

- Marais Contracting Services (France);
- Marais Trenching (South Africa);
- Marais-Lucas Technologie (Australia);
- Marais Tunisie (Tunisie);
- Marais Algérie (Algeria);

== Miscellaneous ==
- 2011 Member of the FTTH Council Europe;
- 2010 Gold Member of the FTTH Council Asia Pacific;
- 2006 French INPI Innovation Award.
