= HD Hyundai =

South Korean conglomerate

HD Hyundai Co., Ltd.

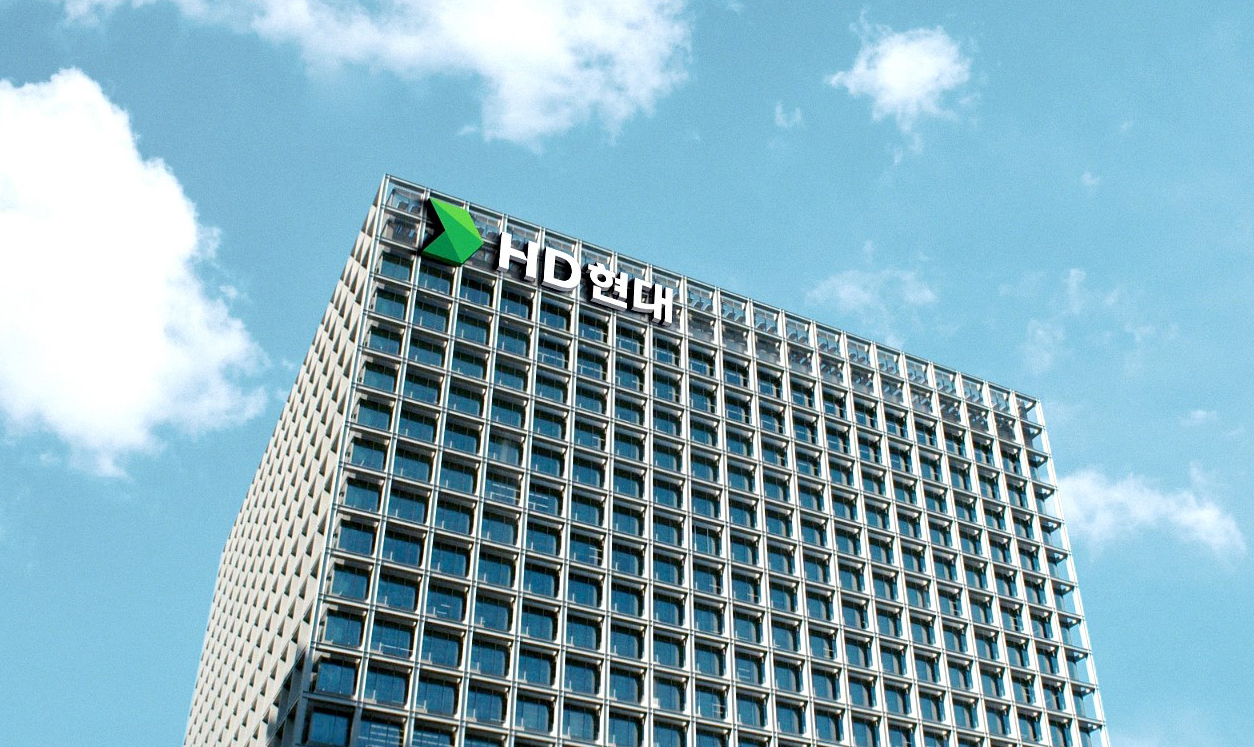
- HD Hyundai Global R&D Center(GRC)
- Formerly: Hyundai Heavy Industries Group
- Type: Public
- Traded as: KRX: 267250
- Headquarters: 477 Bundangsuseo-ro, Bundang-gu, Seongnam-si, Gyeonggi-do, South Korea
- Area served: Worldwide
- Key people: Chung Kisun (Chairman & CEO); Cho Youngcheul (Vice Chairman & CEO)
- Subsidiaries: HD Korea Shipbuilding & Offshore Engineering (KSOE); HD Hyundai Marine Solution; HD Hyundai ENT; Avikus; HD Hyundai XiteSolution; HD Hyundai Robotics; HD Construction Equipment; HD Hyundai Oilbank; HD Hyundai Electric
- Website: www.hd-hyundai.com

HD Hyundai Co., Ltd. (Korean: HD현대) is one of the largest South Korean conglomerates engaged in shipbuilding, heavy equipment, machinery, and the petroleum industry.

HD Hyundai started its shipbuilding business in a small village in Ulsan, South Korea, in 1972 and grew into a global heavy industries company. It is a major supplier in the heavy industries and energy sector, ranging from shipbuilding and marine engineering to oil refining, petrochemicals, and smart energy management businesses.

HD Hyundai rebranded its name of Hyundai Heavy Industries Group (HHI Group) to 'HD Hyundai' in 2022 to mark its 50th anniversary.

== Businesses ==
HD Hyundai operates three core businesses - shipbuilding, heavy equipment, and energy - through HD Korea Shipbuilding & Offshore Engineering, HD Hyundai XiteSolution, and HD Hyundai Oilbank.

HD Korea Shipbuilding & Offshore Engineering is a sub-holding company that controls the group's shipbuilding companies, including HD Hyundai Heavy Industries, HD Hyundai Samho, and HD Hyundai Mipo.

HD Hyundai XiteSolution is another sub-holding company that oversees heavy equipment business, having HD Hyundai Infracore and HD Hyundai Construction Equipment as subsidiaries.

HD Hyundai Oilbank is one of the four major oil refiners in South Korea, along with SK Energy, GS Caltex, and S-Oil.

== Major Affiliates ==
The subsidiaries of HD Hyundai Group are as follows:

=== Shipbuilding and Marine ===
- HD Korea Shipbuilding & Offshore Engineering (KSOE) (Shipbuilding sector)
  - HD Hyundai Heavy Industries (HHI)
  - HD Hyundai Samho (HSHI)
  - HD Hyundai Marine Engine
- HD Hyundai Marine Solution
- HD Hyundai ENT
- Avikus

=== Machinery and Robotics ===
- HD Hyundai XiteSolution
  - HD Construction Equipment
  - Chinese Hydraulic Equipment Corporation
- HD Hyundai Robotics
- HD Hyundai Infracore (Develon)

=== Energy ===
- HD Korea Shipbuilding & Offshore Engineering (KSOE) (Energy sector)
  - HD Hyundai Energy Solutions
  - HD Hydrogen
- HD Hyundai Oilbank
  - HD Hyundai Chemical
  - HD Hyundai & Shell Base Oil
  - HD Hyundai OCI
  - HD Hyundai E&F
- HD Hyundai Electric

=== Other sectors ===
- HD Hyundai Asia Holdings (a subsidiary of HD Korea Shipbuilding & Offshore Engineering)

== "Make American Shipbuilding Great Again" (MASGA) ==
In 2025, HD Hyundai announced the "Make American Shipbuilding Great Again" (MASGA) initiative, proposing $150 billion from South Korea's shipbuilding industry into the United States maritime industry. Implementation of the initiative has been described as contingent on changes to U.S. law, particularly restrictions related to the Jones Act, which restricts foreign participation in domestic shipbuilding and shipping.

Legislative proposals including the Merchant Marine Allies Partnership Act, Ensuring Naval Readiness Act, and SHIPS for America Act, would permit expanded involvement and construction of U.S. naval vessels in allied countries. However as of August 2025, only the Merchant Marine Allies Partnership Act has progressed. Observers attribute the slow acceptance of MASGA to opposition from American metalworker unions and security concerns related to weapons systems and naval vessels.

== Criticism and controversies ==
HD Hyundai has been associated with a number of controversies related to environmental impacts and Indigenous land degradation.

In the 1970's, part of the Bikin Forest was sold to Hyundai by the Russian government. Pavel Sulyandziga, one of the primary Indigenous activists opposing the purchase, stated that following the company's arrival, four out of eight Udege groups ceased to exist. Indigenous activists coordinated with the Russian government to establish a protected national park in the area.

According to a 2023 Greenpeace East Asia report, HD Hyundai has been the most widely used brand of heavy machinery in the Brazilian Amazon for illegal gold mining operations, including the territories of the Kayapo, Yanomami, and Munduruku people. The mining has been linked to mercury and sediment pollution. Reporting by Sumaúma with data provided by DataSUS, associated the pollution from mining to severe health impacts and death rates among the Yanomami, which contributed to a declaration of a state of emergency by Brazil.

In 2023, Kayapó leader Doto Takak Ire and international campaigners with Greenpeace East Asia held a press conference on the issue. HD Hyundai subsequently stated that it would take actionable steps to prevent its equipment from being used in illegal mining. In 2024 however, Repórter Brazil reported that HD Hyundai machinery remains the most commonly used in illegal gold mining operations.

HD Hyundai machinery was documented by Amnesty International Korea, Evidence Lab, and B'Tselem in 2025 as being used by Israeli forces in demolitions of Palestinian homes and businesses in the occupied Palestinian territories. The company denys knowledge despite photo and testimonial evidence.

== Sport and Education Affiliates ==
=== Sport ===
- Ulsan HD Football club

== See also ==
- Ulsan HD Football Club
- Hyundai and unions
