= HD Hyundai Oilbank =

Petroleum and refinery company

HD Hyundai Oilbank Co., Ltd.
- Native name: 에이치디현대오일뱅크 주식회사
- Formerly: Kukdong Oil; Hyundai Oilbank
- Type: Subsidiary
- Industry: Petroleum
- Founded: November 19, 1964; 61 years ago
- Headquarters: Seosan, South Korea
- Parent: HD Hyundai
- Website: www.oilbank.co.kr

HD Hyundai Oil Bank Co., Ltd. (Korean: 에이치디현대오일뱅크 주식회사) is a petroleum and refinery company with its headquarters in Seosan, South Korea. It was established in 1964 as Kukdong Oil Industry Company (Korean: 극동정유; Hanja: 極東精油; RR: Geukdong Jeongyu; MR: Kŭktongjŏngyu) and later taken over by the Hyundai Group in 1993. It is currently a part of the HD Hyundai Group. Its primary business is petroleum products, similar to the SK Energy, GS Caltex, and S-Oil.

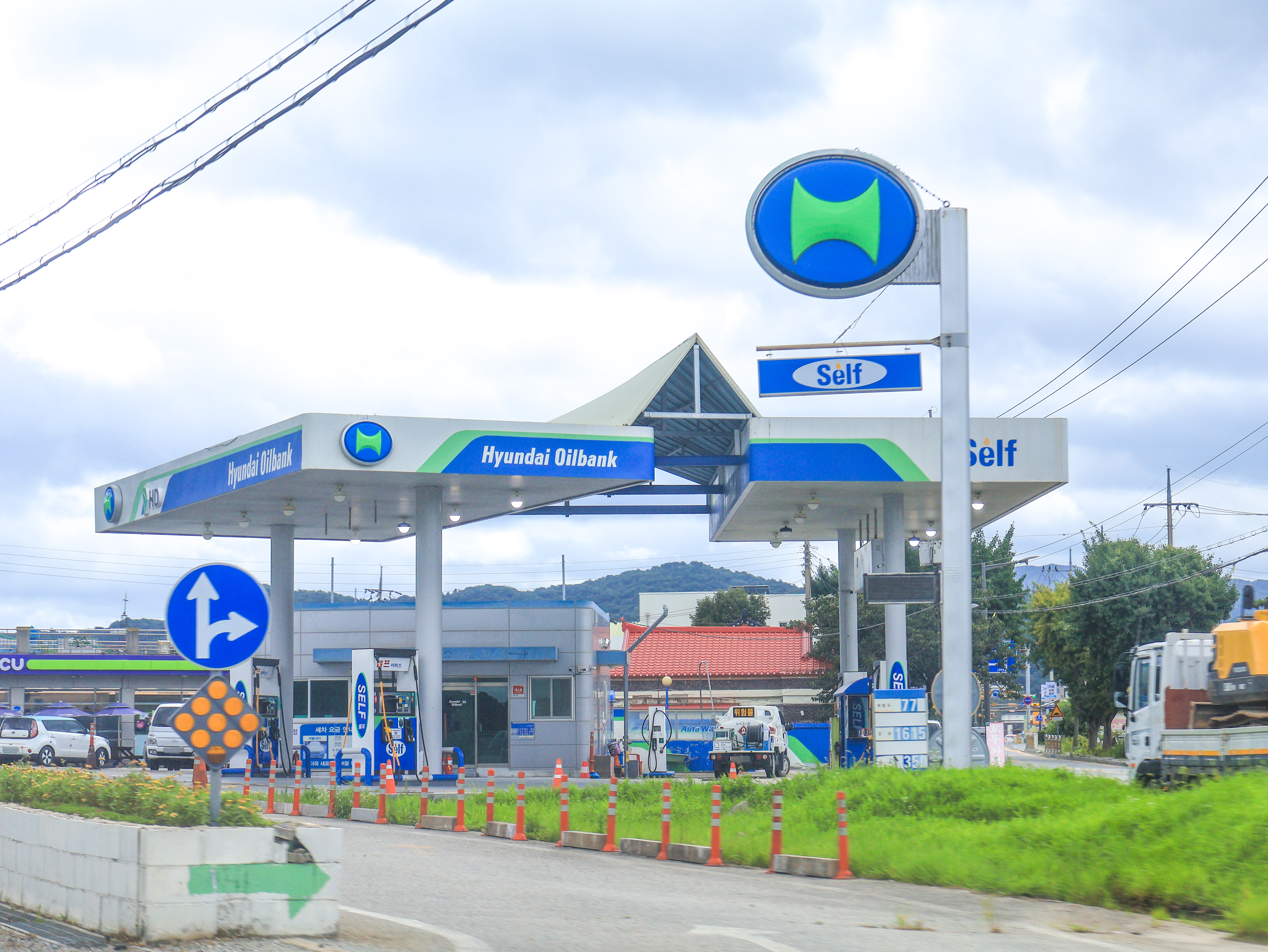
A Hyundai Oilbank gas station in Chungnam

== See also ==
- Energy in South Korea
- Economy of South Korea
