= HD Hyundai Electric =

South Korean manufacturer

HD Hyundai Electric Co., Ltd.
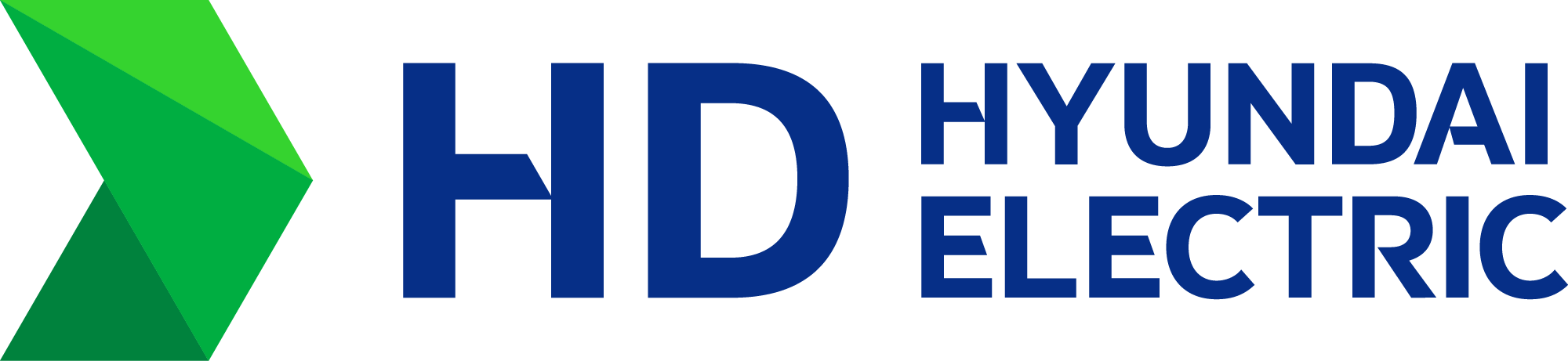
- Native name: HD현대일렉트릭
- Company type: Public
- Traded as: KRX: 267260
- Industry: Renewable energy industry
- Founded: 3 April 2017; 9 years ago
- Headquarters: Seongnam, South Korea
- Products: Wind power turbines, power transformer
- Number of employees: 2,118 (2023)
- Parent: HD Hyundai
- Website: www.hd-hyundaielectric.com/elect/ko/

HD Hyundai Electric (Korean: HD현대일렉트릭) is a South Korean manufacturer of power transformers and other electrical equipment. By 2017, the company had supplied a cumulative total of over 1.2 million kWA transformers to 70 countries around the world.

== History ==
In 1977, the Heavy Electrical Equipment Division of Hyundai Heavy Industries was established. The following year, it began producing transformers, and in November of that year, it became independent as Hyundai Heavy Electric (현대중전기). In 1993, it was merged into Hyundai Heavy Industries and took the form of the Heavy Electricity Business Division, and in 2001, its name was changed to the Electrical and Electronic Systems Business Division. In April 2017, Hyundai Electric was launched as a result of Hyundai Heavy Industries' spin-off into Hyundai Heavy Industries, Hyundai Robotics, Hyundai Construction Equipment, and Hyundai Electric.

In December 2023, it was included in the KOSPI 200 constituents.

Its USA power transformers subsidiary, established in 2011, began groundbreaking on its second Alabama facility in March 2026.

== Product ==
By 2017, HD Hyundai Electric had supplied a cumulative total of over 1.2 million kWA transformers to 70 countries around the world. According to a 2025 report from the Maeil Business Newspaper, it ranks first and second in the ultra-high voltage transformer market share in the United States and Saudi Arabia, respectively.
