= Anhui Heli =

Chinese construction equipment maker

Anhui Heli Co., Ltd.
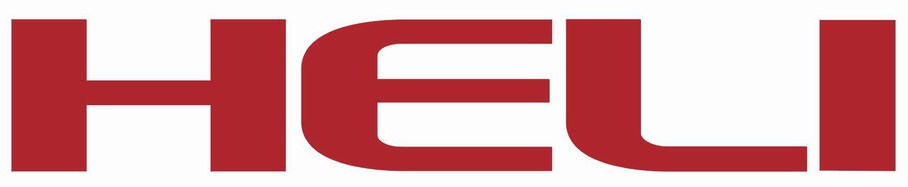
- Industry: Construction equipment
- Founded: 1958
- Headquarters: Hefei, Anhui
- Products: Forklifts, loaders, container handlers, reach stackers
- Website: www.helichina.com

CHL CPCD 30 forklift in Dnipro, Ukraine. CHL means China Heli Lifting

Heli is a Chinese construction equipment maker, primarily known for producing forklift trucks. With about US$1 billion in turnover for forklifts, Heli is the largest maker in China and the 7th-largest in the world based on a ranking by 2018 sales revenue compiled by Modern Materials Handling.

CHL - new brand under Anhui Forklift Group.
