= Heavy equipment =

Vehicles designed for executing construction tasks

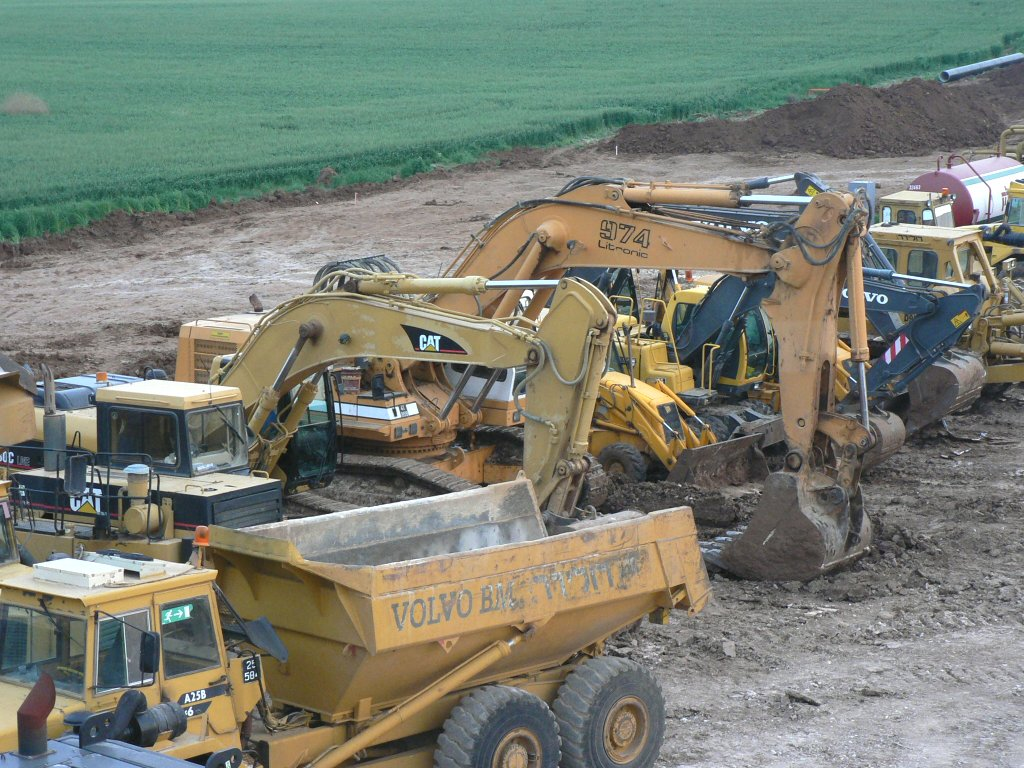
Heavy equipment vehicles of various types parked near a highway construction site

Heavy equipment, heavy machinery, earthmovers, earth-moving machinery(EMM), construction vehicles, or construction equipment, refers to heavy-duty vehicles specially designed to execute construction tasks, most frequently involving earthwork operations or other large construction tasks. Heavy equipment usually comprises five equipment systems: the implement, traction, structure, power train, and control/information.

Heavy equipment has been used since at least the 1st century BC, when the ancient Roman engineer Vitruvius described a crane powered by human or animal labor in De architectura.

Heavy equipment functions through the mechanical advantage of a simple machine that multiplies the ratio between input force applied and force exerted, easing and speeding tasks which often could otherwise take hundreds of people and many weeks' labor. Some such equipment uses hydraulic drives as a primary source of motion.

The word plant, in this context, has come to mean any type of industrial equipment, including mobile equipment (e.g. in the same sense as powerplant). However, plant originally meant "structure" or "establishment" – usually in the sense of factory or warehouse premises; as such, it was used in contradistinction to movable machinery, often in the phrase "plant and equipment".

== Innovations and new technologies ==
The design of heavy equipment has increasingly incorporated modern electronics and software, a process known as Fleet digitalization. This integration of technology facilitates greater automation, safety monitoring, and operational efficiency on construction and mining sites, creating what is often referred to as an intelligent job site.

=== Fleet telematics and monitoring ===
Fleet telematics systems are utilized for the Fleet management of heavy equipment. A ruggedized Telematic control unit, installed on each asset, uses a GPS tracking unit to provide real-time Vehicle location data. In addition to location, the system transmits a wide range of telemetry data, including engine hours, fuel consumption, idle time, and diagnostic fault codes. This data is used for operational oversight, such as to track asset utilization, schedule predictive maintenance, and manage fuel with Fuel-management systems. Studies in the construction industry have correlated the use of such systems with improvements in overall project efficiency. A primary function of these platforms is to address the challenge of aggregating data from a mixed fleet of equipment from various manufacturers into a single, unified interface.

=== Autonomy and robotics ===
Research and development in heavy equipment has increasingly focused on robotics and autonomous operation. Several manufacturers have commercialized autonomous systems that allow machines like haul trucks and dozers to operate without a human driver by following pre-programmed routes from a digital site plan. Such applications are most prevalent in mining and large-scale earthwork operations where tasks are repetitive and occur in controlled environments. Semi-autonomous features, such as grade control and automated digging cycles on excavators, are also becoming common, assisting operators in performing tasks with greater speed and precision.

=== Operator safety and assistance ===
Technology is applied to improve operator safety and situational awareness. Video telematics systems, which utilize multiple ruggedized cameras, offer operators a comprehensive view of their surroundings to mitigate blind spots. These systems also record operational data for incident analysis. Operator scoring applications analyze telemetry data to identify potentially hazardous operating practices, such as excessive speed or abrupt movements, providing a basis for targeted safety training. Advanced driver-assistance systems (ADAS) are also being adapted for heavy equipment, with features like object detection and collision avoidance alerts to protect both the operator and ground personnel.

=== Electrification ===
The development of electric and hybrid-electric powertrains is an area of ongoing development in heavy equipment manufacturing. Several manufacturers, including Caterpillar, Volvo, and Liebherr, have produced electric or hybrid-electric prototypes and commercial models. While technical challenges related to battery capacity and charging infrastructure persist for the largest classes of equipment, electric powertrains provide operational advantages such as the elimination of on-site emissions, reduced noise levels for operation in urban areas, and potentially lower maintenance and energy costs.

== Types ==
These subdivisions, in this order, are the standard heavy equipment categorization.

Tractor

- Bulldozer (dozer, track dozer)
- Snowcat
- Snowplow
- Skidder
- Tractor (wheel tractor)
- Track tractor
- Locomotive
- Artillery tractor
- Crawler-transporter
- Military engineering vehicles

Grader

- Grader

Excavator

- Amphibious excavator
- Compact excavator
- Dragline excavator
- Dredger
- Bucket-wheel excavator
- Excavator (digger)
- Long reach excavator
- Power shovel
- Reclaimer
- Suction excavator
- Walking excavator
- Trencher
- Yarder

Backhoe

- Backhoe
- Backhoe loader

Timber

- Feller buncher
- Harvester
- Forwarder
- Logging truck
- Skidder
- Power saw
- Stump grinder
- Track harvester
- Wheel forwarder
- Wheel skidder

Pipelayer

- Pipelayer (sideboom)

Scraper

- Fresno scraper
- Scraper
- Wheel tractor-scraper (belly scraper)

Mining

- Construction and mining tractor
- Construction and mining truck
- Dumper
- Dump truck
- Haul truck
- Mining equipment
- Reclaimer
- Stacker
- Spreader

Articulated

- Articulated hauler

Compactor

- Wheel dozer (soil compactor)
- Soil stabilizer

Loader

- Loader (payloader, front loader, wheel loader, integrated tool carrier)
- Skip loader (skippy)

Track loader

- Track loader

Skid-steer loader

- Skid-steer loader

Material handler

- Aerial work platform, Lift table
- Crane
- Block-setting crane
- Bulk-handling crane
- Crane vessel
- Aerial crane
- Container crane
- Gantry crane
- Overhead crane
- Electric overhead traveling crane
- Ring crane
- Level luffing crane
- Mobile crane
- Travel lift
- Forklift
- Garbage truck
- Grapple truck, Knuckleboom loader (trailer mount)
- Straddle carrier
- Sidelifter
- Reach stacker
- Telescopic handlers
- Tow truck

Paving

- Asphalt paver
- Asphalt plant
- Cold planer
- Cure rig
- Paver
- Pavement milling
- Pneumatic tire compactor
- Roller (road roller, roller compactor)
- Slipform paver
- Vibratory compactor, Compactor

Underground

- Roadheader
- Tunnel boring machine
- Underground mining equipment

Hydromatic tool

- Ballast tamper
- Attachments
- Drilling rig
- Horizontal directional drilling
- Earth auger
- Pile driver
- Post pounder
- Rotary tiller (rototiller, rotovator)

Hydraulic machinery

Highway

- Tractor unit
- Ballast tractor
- Pushback tractor
- Railcar mover
- Highway 10 yard rear dump
- Highway bottom dump (stiff), pup (belly train), triple
- Highway end dump and side dump
- Highway transfer, Transfer train
- Concrete mixer
- Concrete mix truck
- Concrete mix dozer
- Lowboy (trailer)
- Street sweeper
- Street sweep truck
- Street sweep dozer

=== Images ===
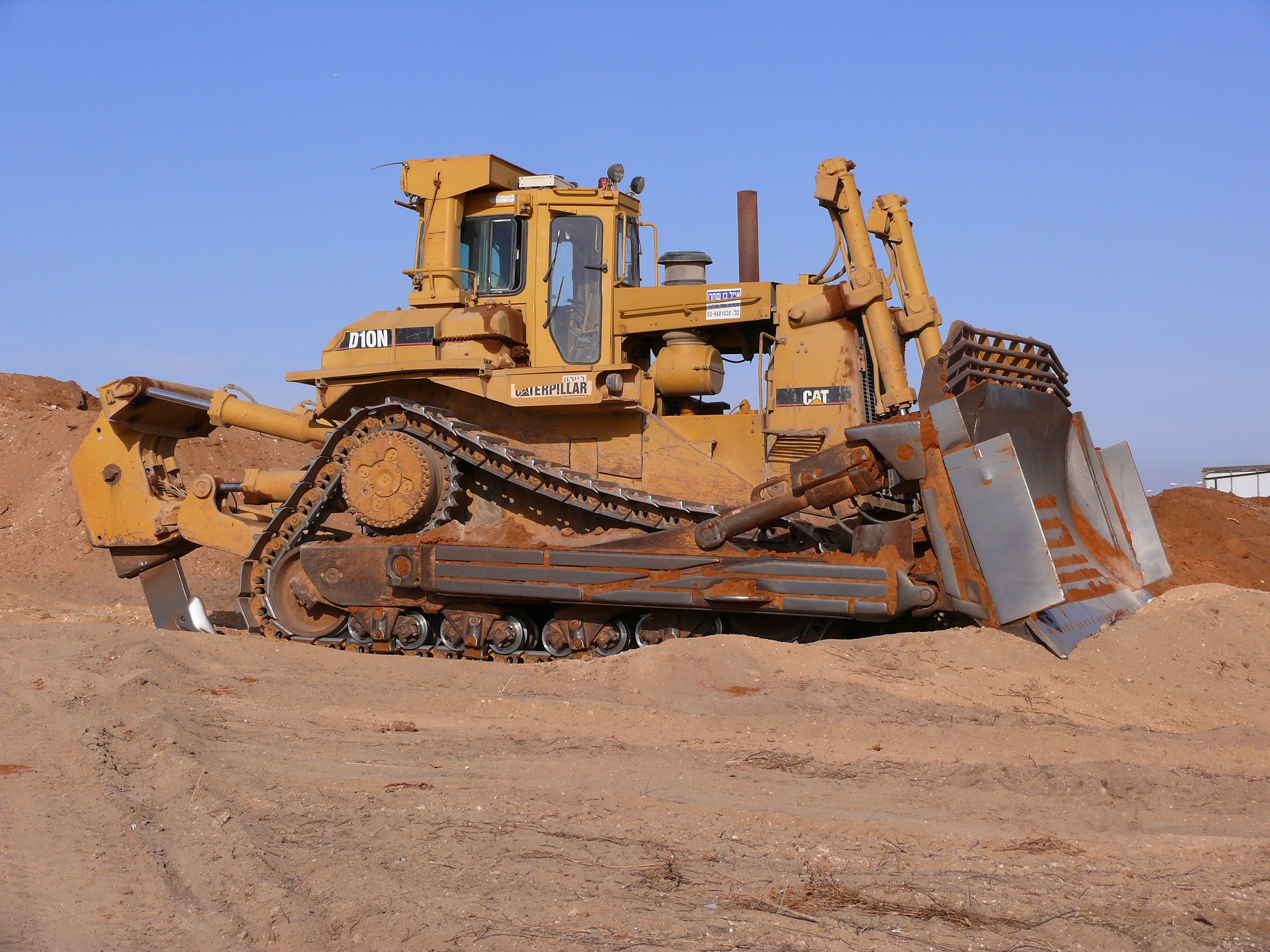
The Caterpillar D10N bulldozer evolved from tracked-type tractors and is characterized by a steel blade attached to the front that is used to push other equipment and construction materials, such as earth.

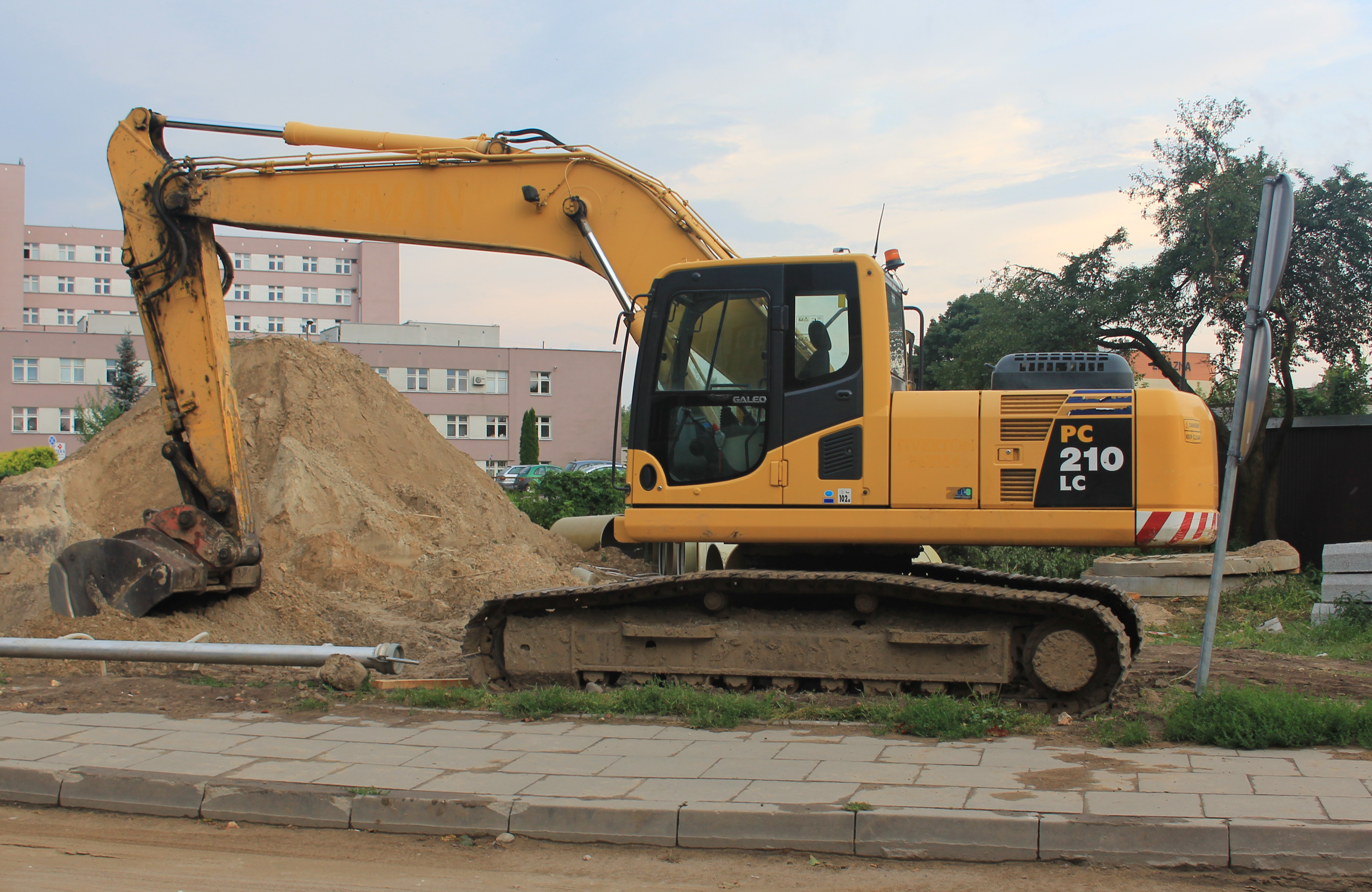
The bucket excavator Komatsu PC210-LC.

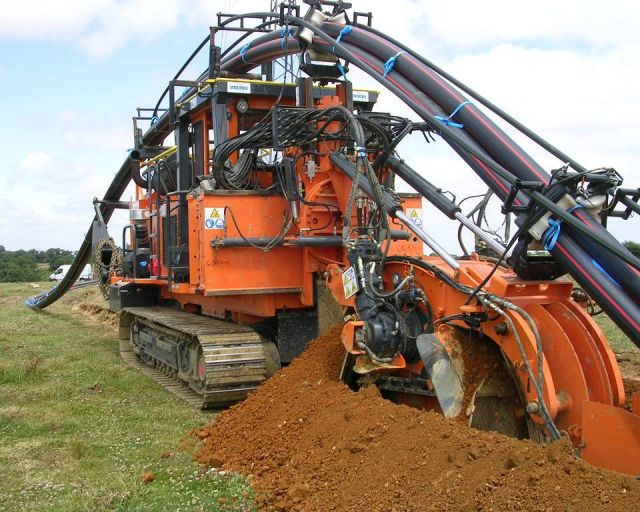
The wheel trencher MARAIS SMC 200 R.

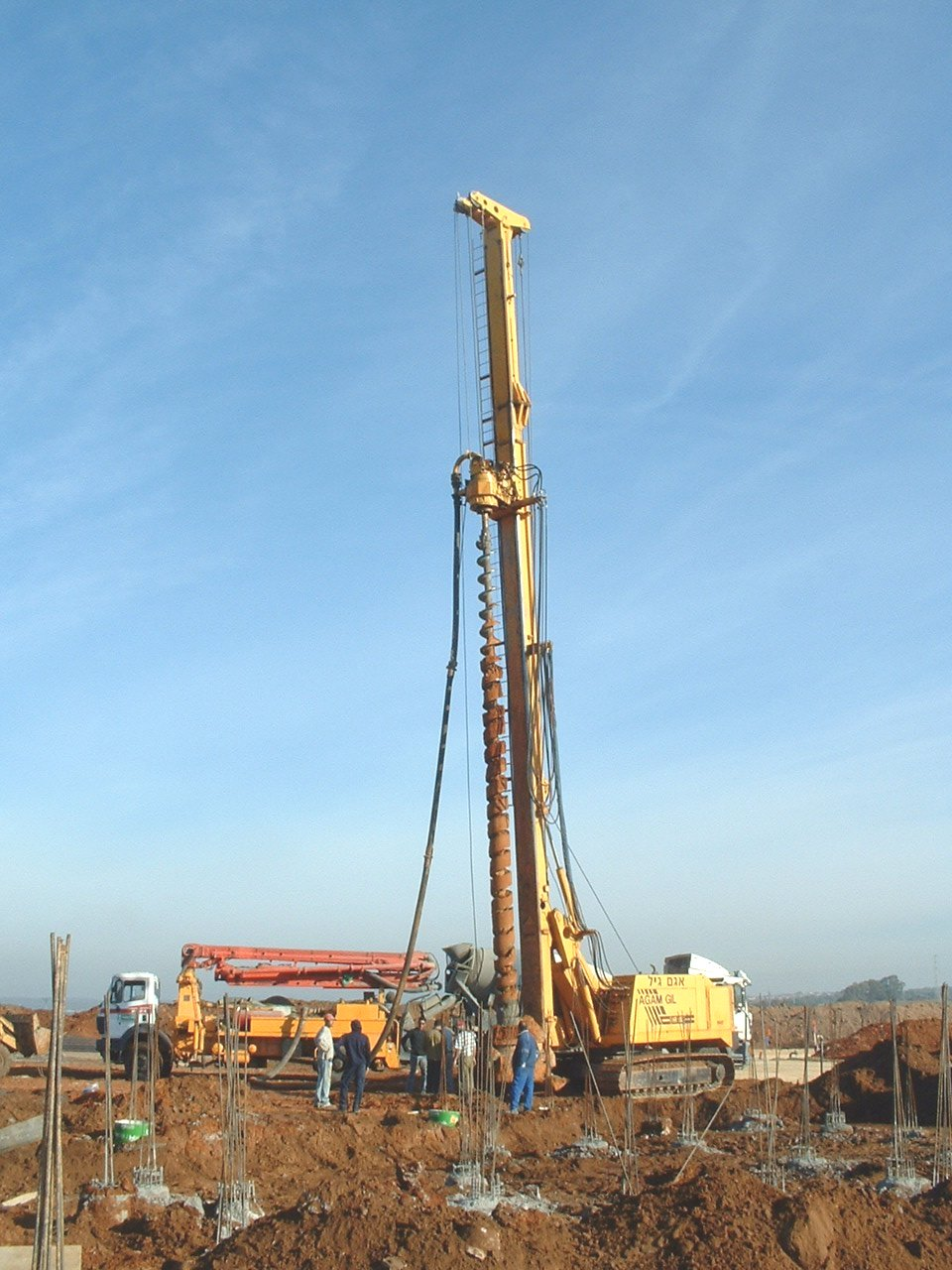
Iron bar reinforced foundation piles are driven with a drilling machine, concrete pump, mixer-truck, and a specialized auger that allows pumping concrete through its axis while withdrawn.

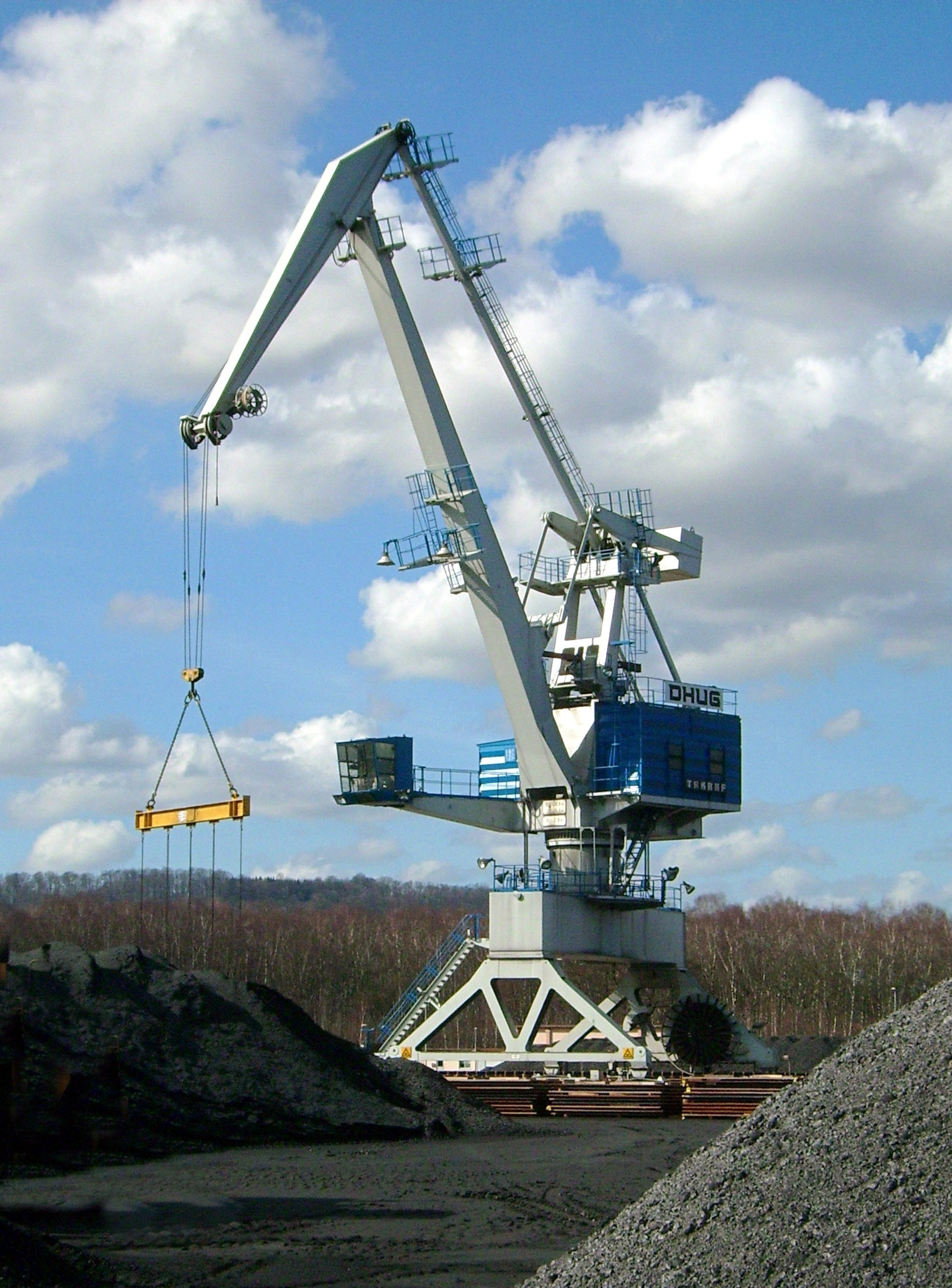
Fixed crane in a coal mine in Germany

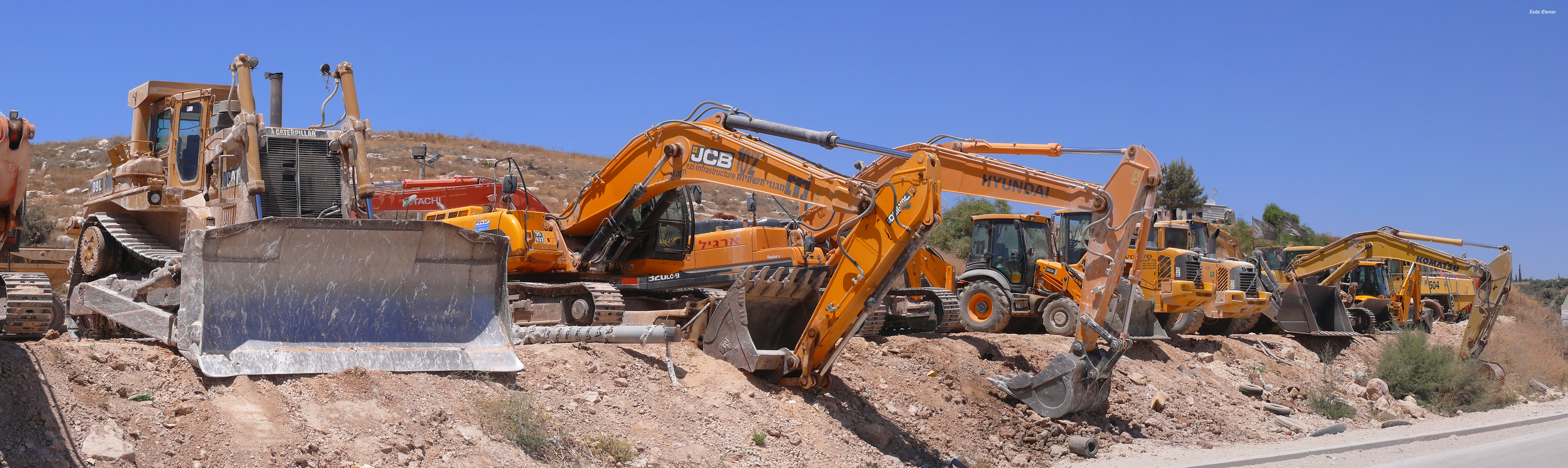
Caterpillar D9L bulldozer, excavators and other heavy equipment vehicles parked near a quarry in Israel

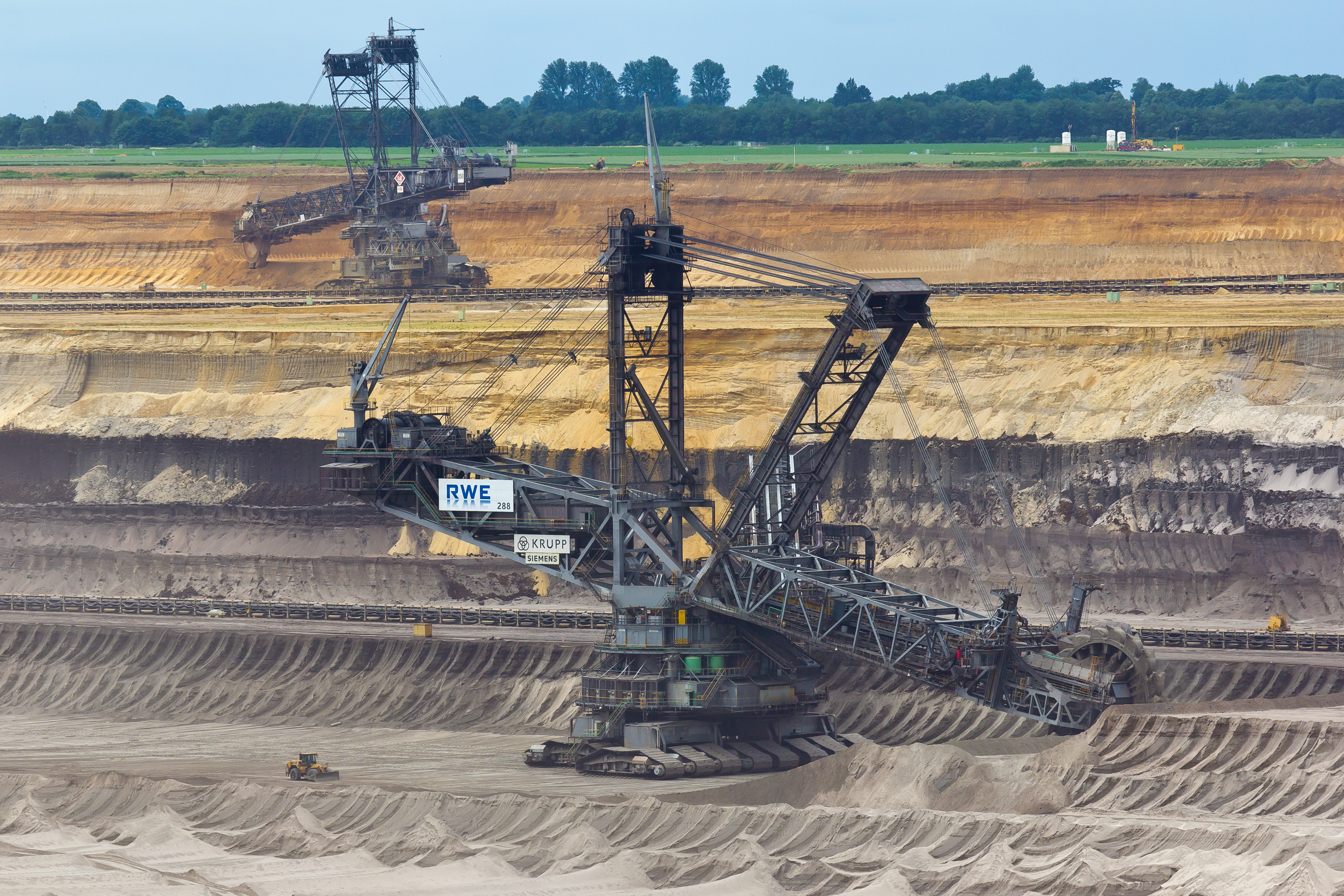
Bucket wheel excavators in Garzweiler surface mine, Germany

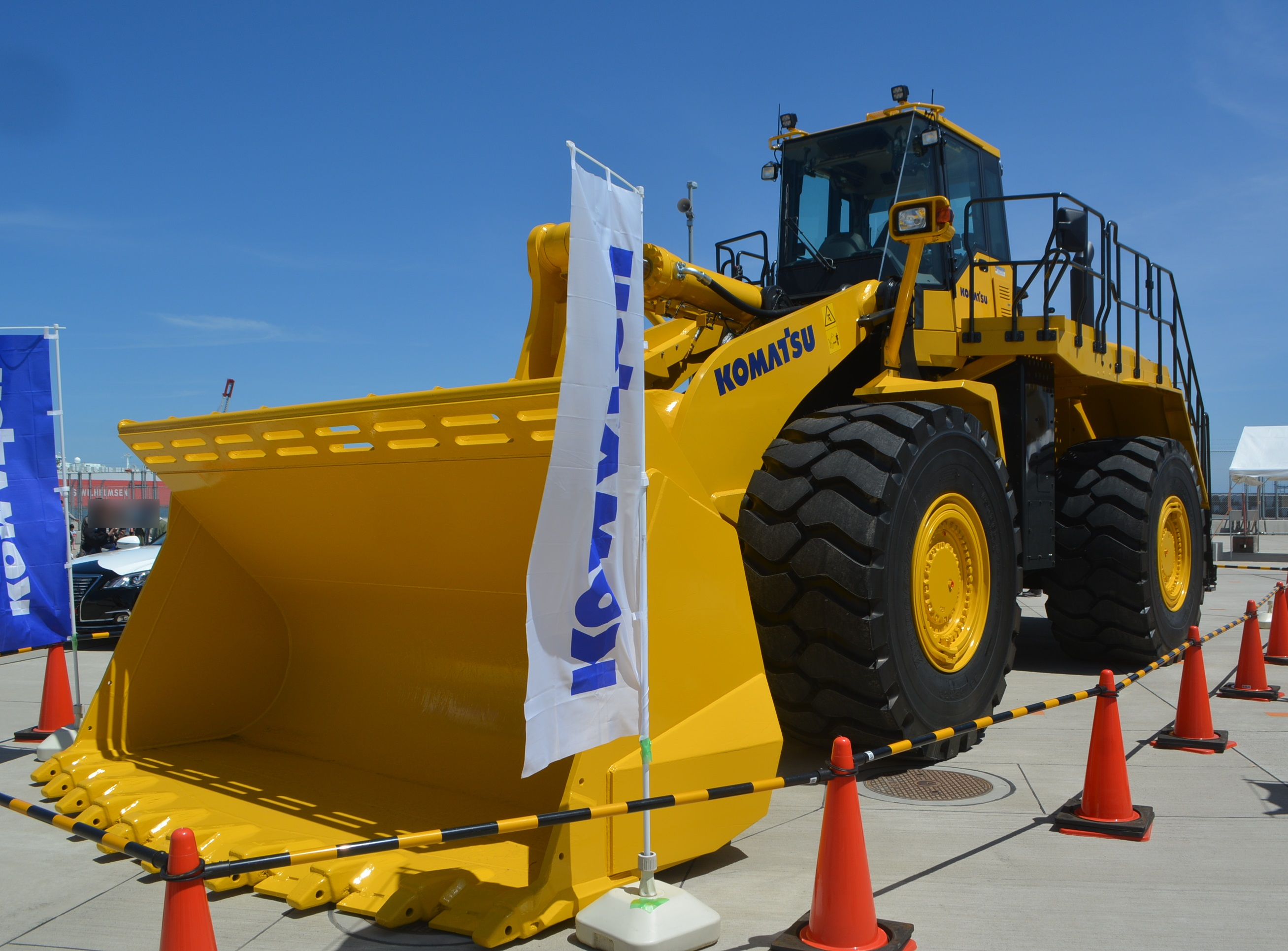
Wheel loader

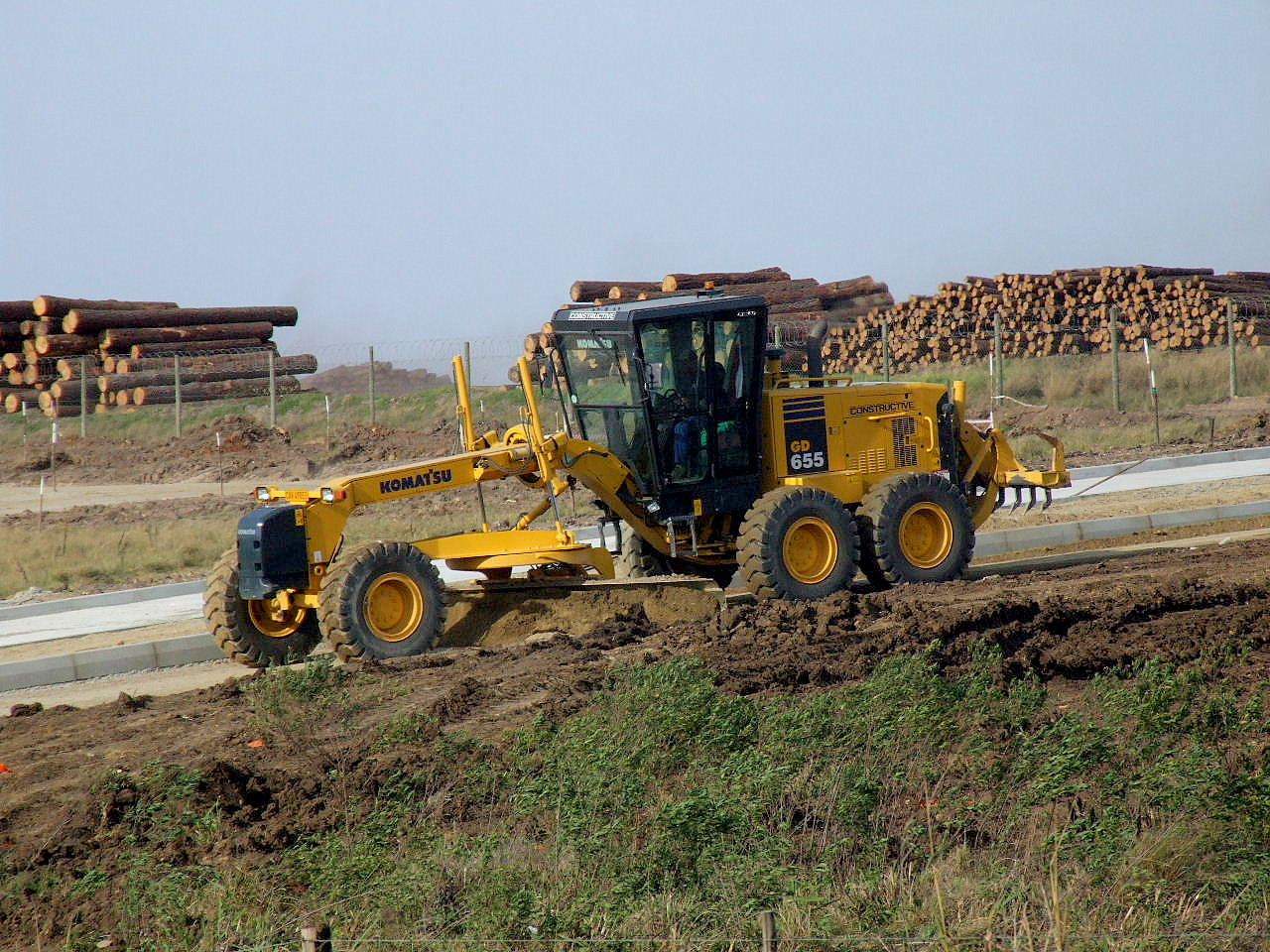
Grader cleaning and leveling

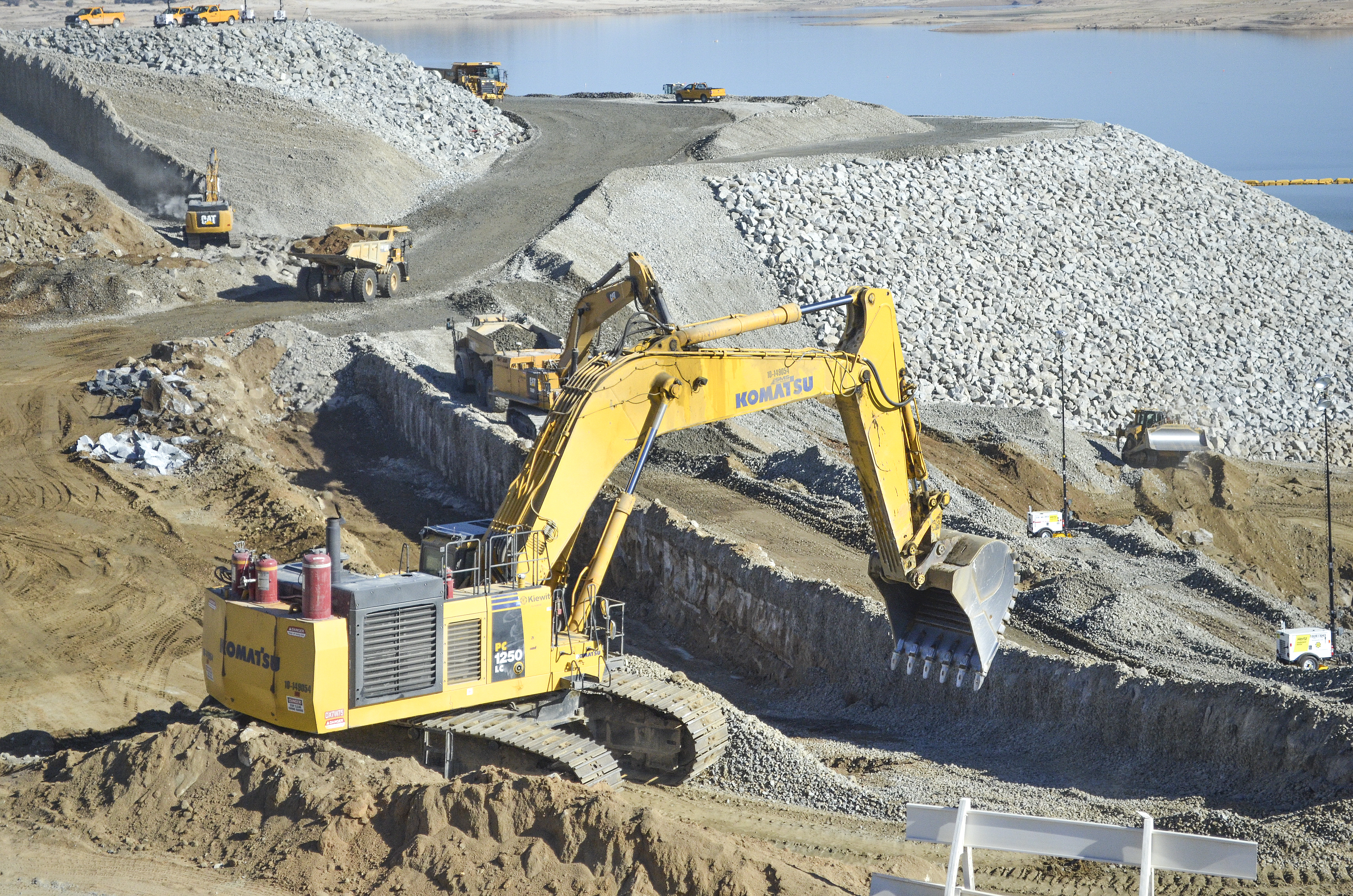
Heavy duty excavator with large bucket equipped.

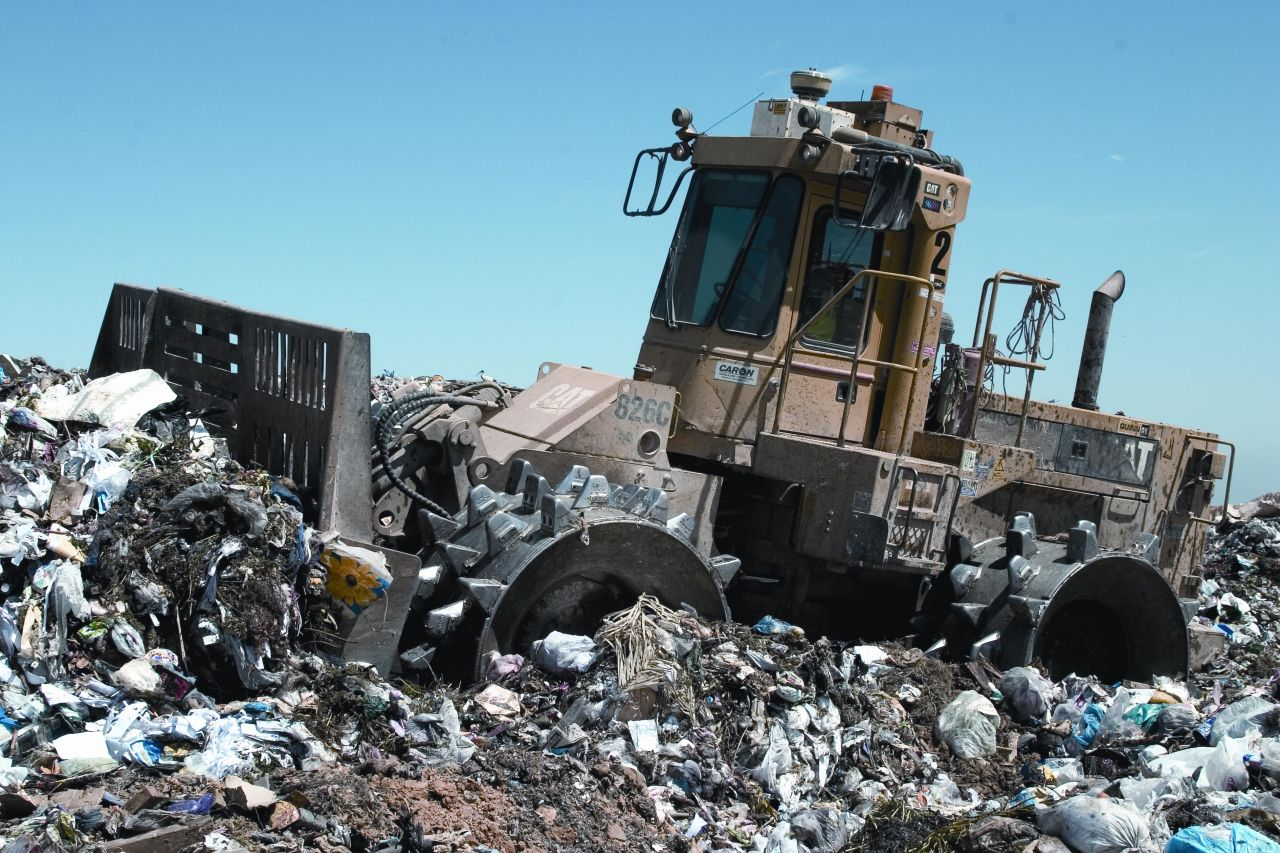
Landfill compactor (tamping tip)

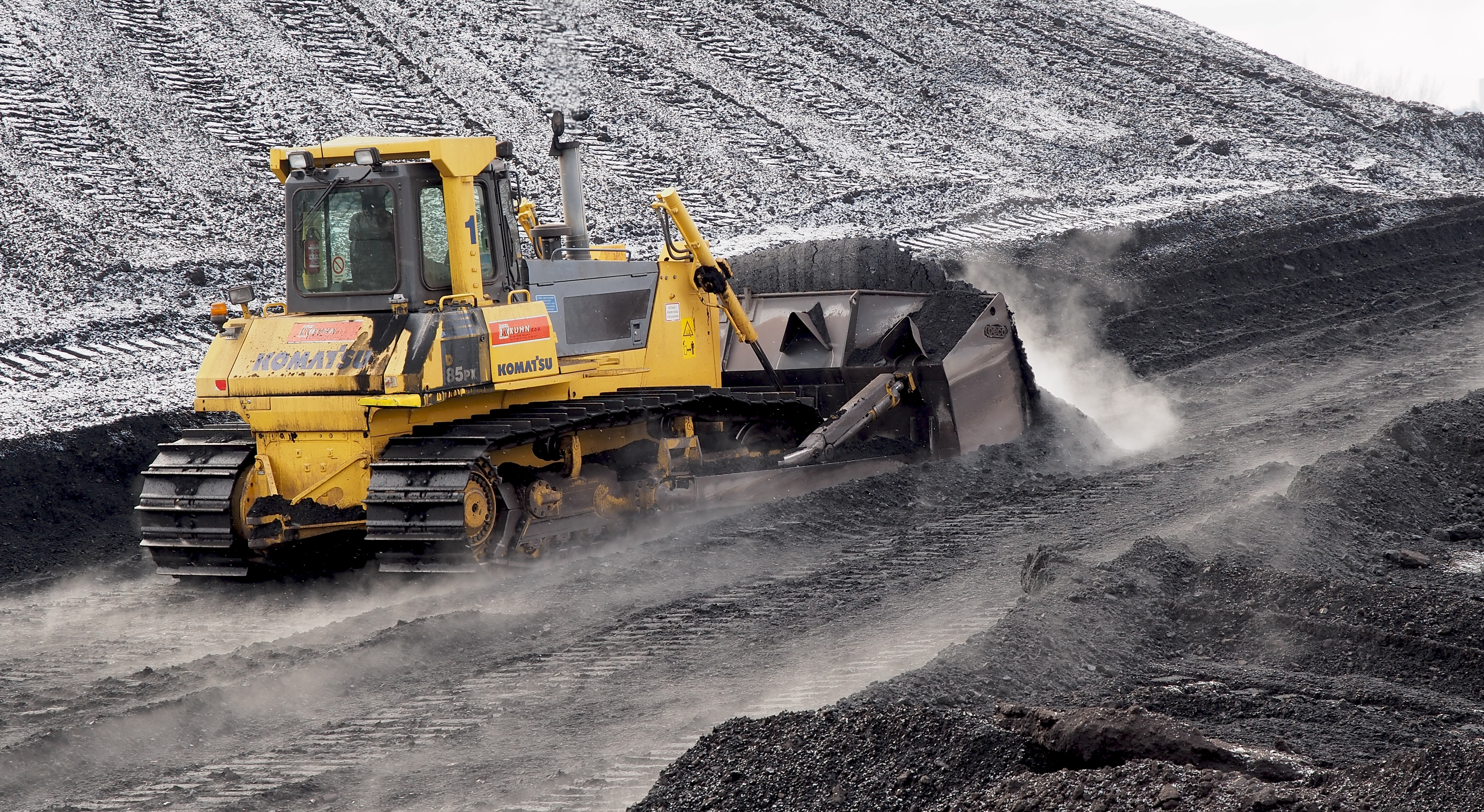
Komatsu Dozer pushing coal on the job site

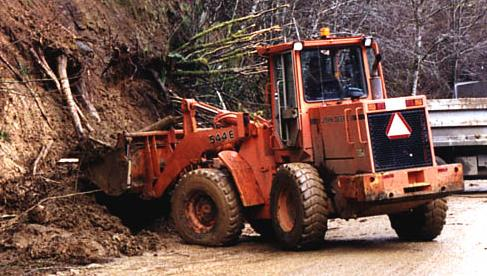
A wheeled front loader tractor equipped with a large bucket elevated by hydraulic rams.

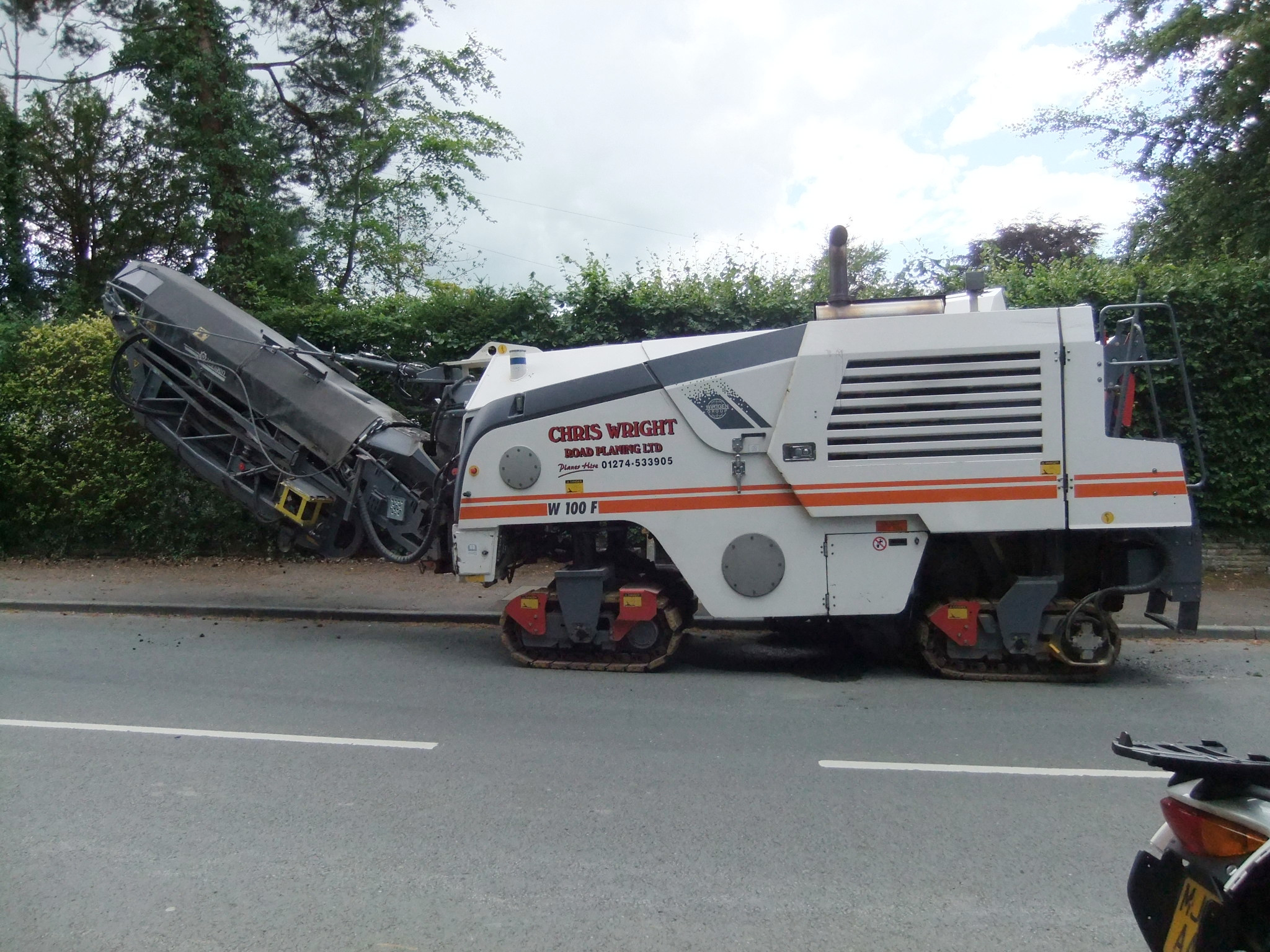
Folded conveyor on a tracked grinder
Military engineering vehicles

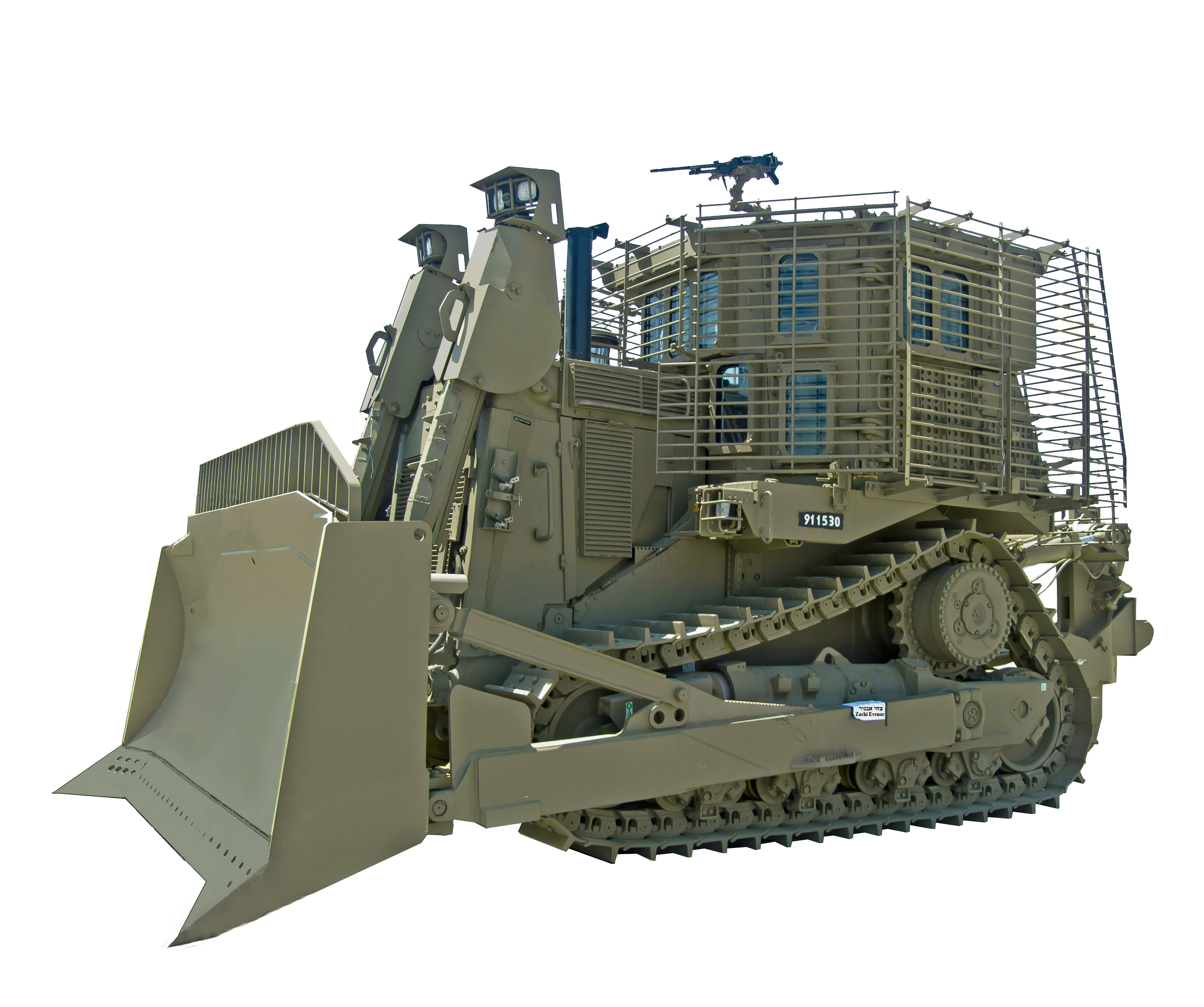
The militarized Caterpillar D9 armored bulldozer allows for earthmoving projects in a combat environment. In the picture: IDF Caterpillar D9R.

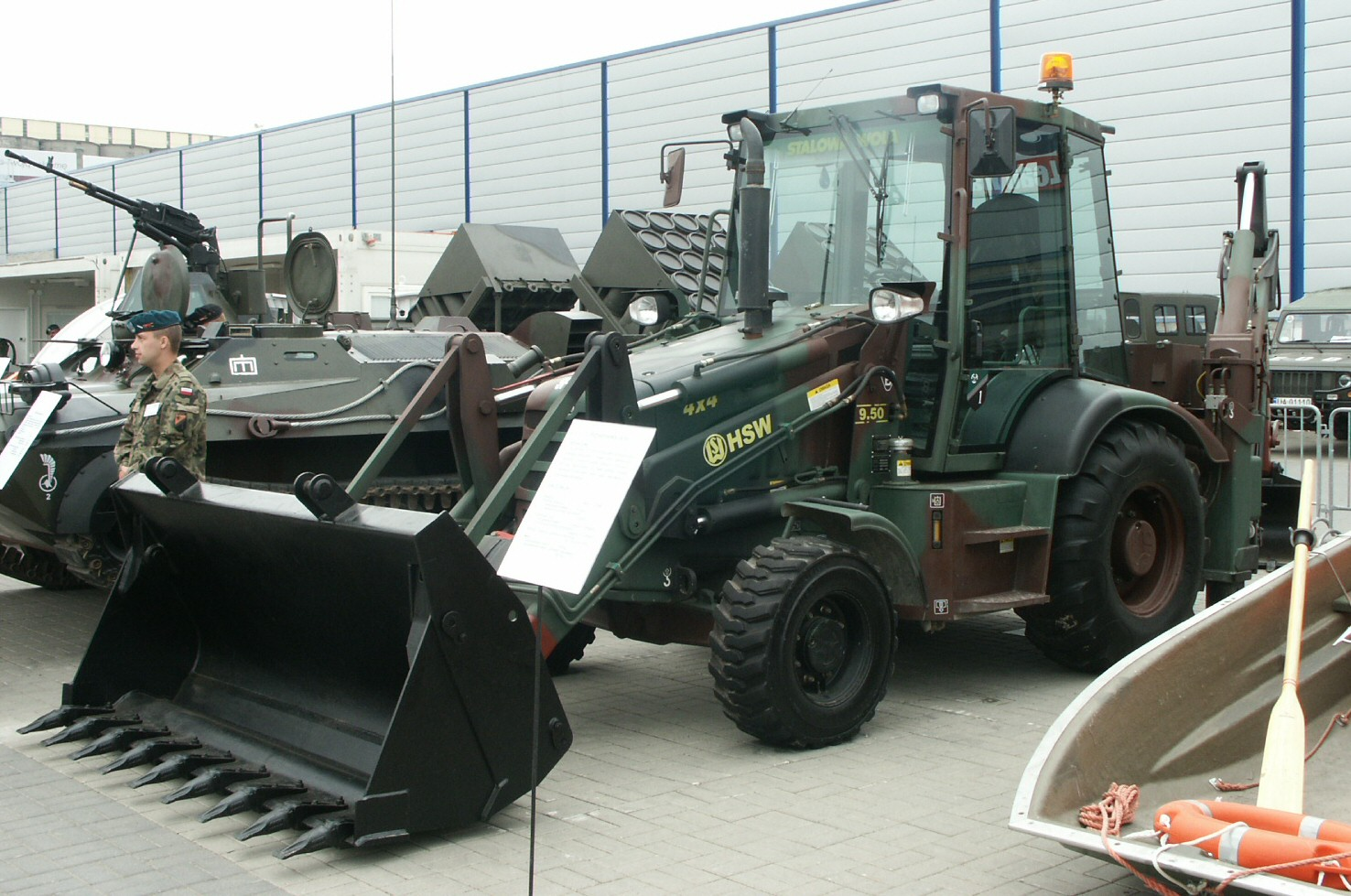
The militarized Huta Stalowa Wola backhoe loader in Poland which is subsidiary of LiuGong China

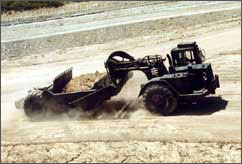
Military scraper

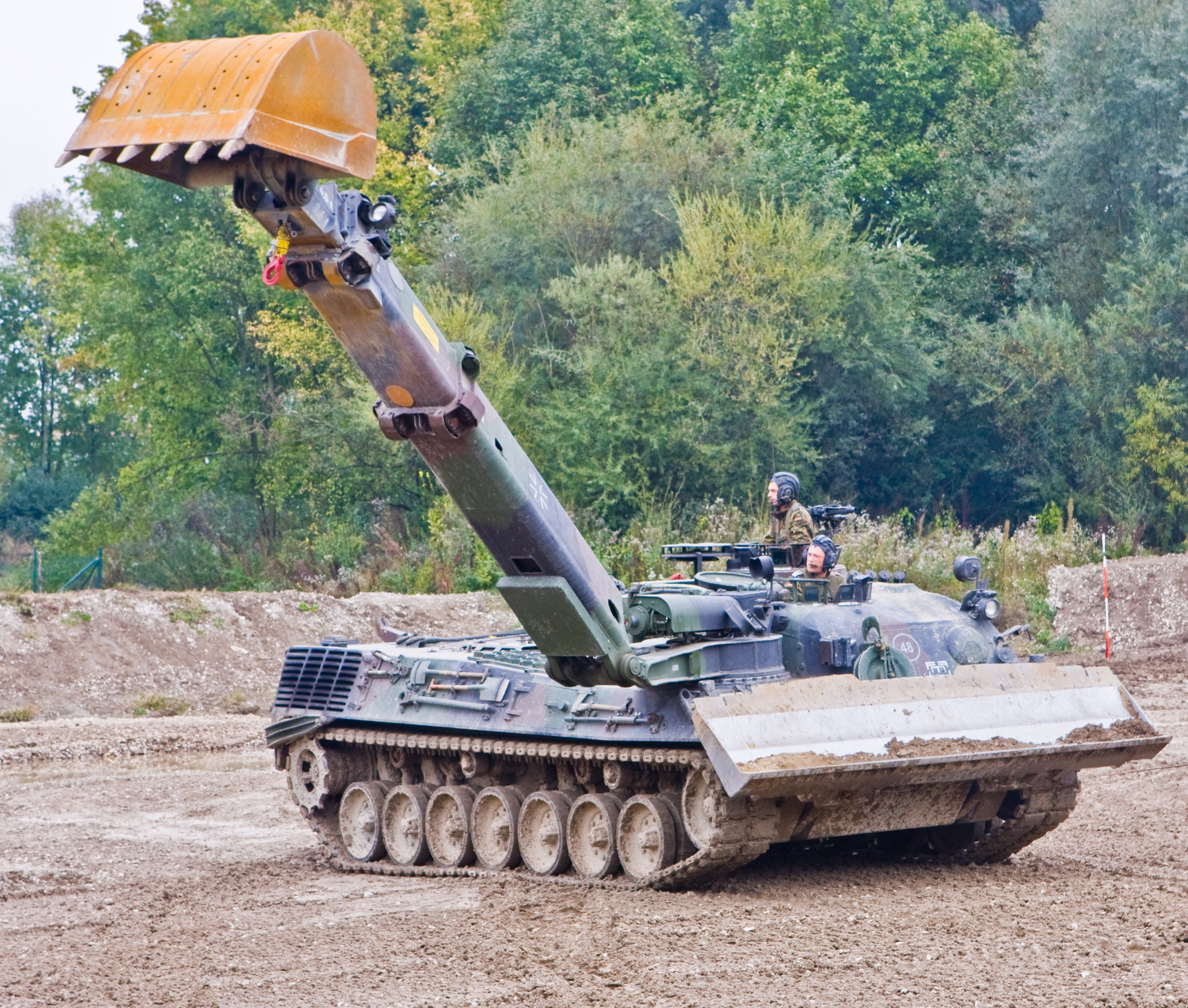
PiPz Dachs armoured engineering vehicle of the German Army (2008)

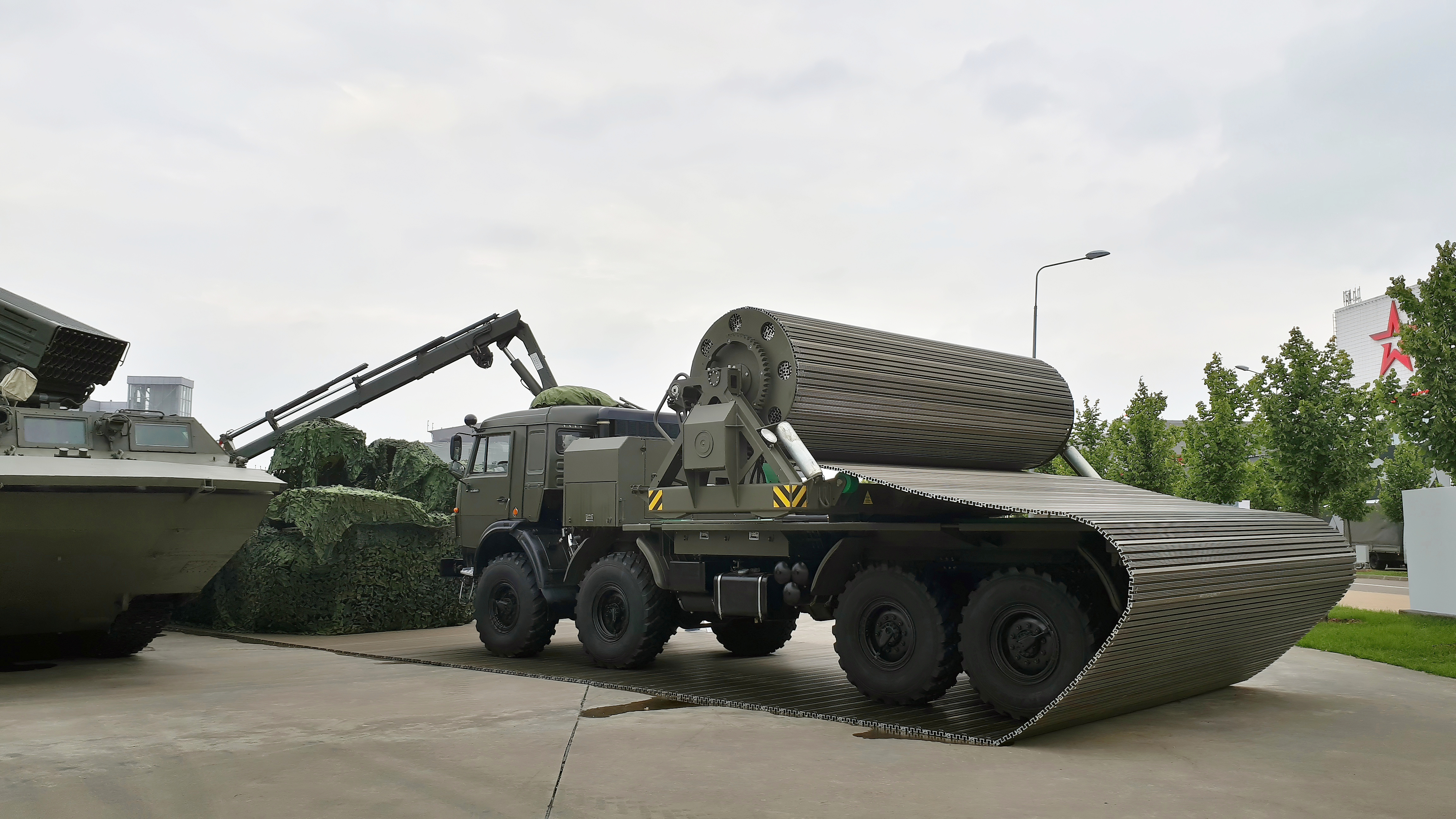
Temporary roads deployment complex during the "Armiya 2021" exhibition

== Implements and hydromechanical work tools ==
- auger
- backhoe
- bale spear
- broom
- bulldozer blade
- clam shell bucket
- cold plane
- demolition shears
- equipment bucket
- excavator bucket
- forks
- grapple
- hydraulic hammer, hoe ram
- hydraulics
- hydraulic tilting bucket (4-in-1)
- landscape tiller
- material handling arm
- mechanical pulverizer, crusher
- multi processor
- pavement removal bucket
- pile driver
- power take-off (PTO)
- quick coupler
- rake
- ripper
- rotating grab
- sheep's foot compactor
- skeleton bucket
- snow blower
- stump grinder
- stump shear
- thumb
- tiltrotator
- trencher
- vibratory plate compactor
- wheel saw

== Traction: Off-the-road tires and tracks ==
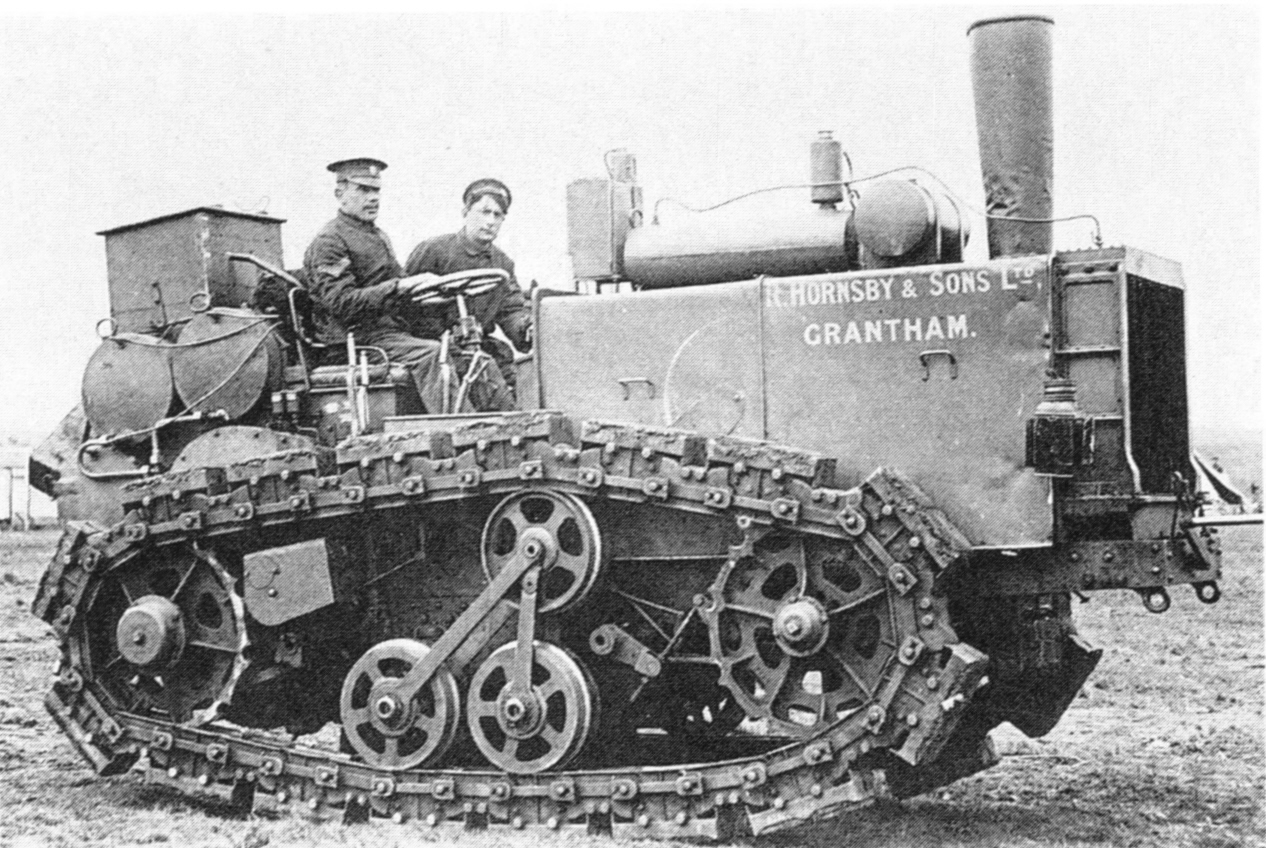
Continuous track (circa 1909)

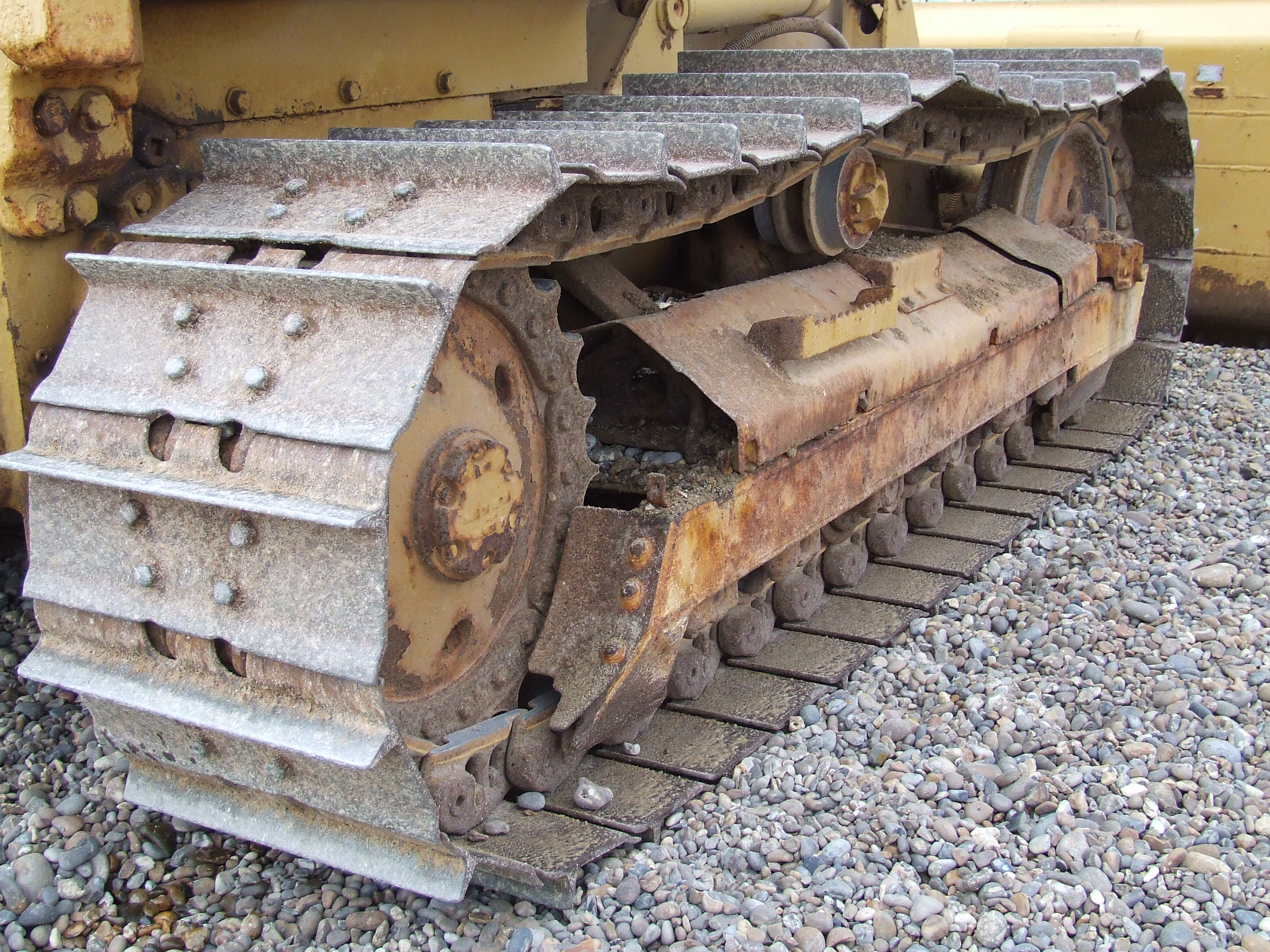
Caterpillar track (circa 2009)

Heavy equipment requires specialized tires for various construction applications. While many types of equipment have continuous tracks applicable to more severe service requirements, tires are used where greater speed or mobility is required. An understanding of what equipment will be used for during the life of the tires is required for proper selection. Tire selection can have a significant impact on production and unit cost. There are three types of off-the-road tires, transport for earthmoving machines, work for slow moving earthmoving machines, and load and carry for transporting as well as digging. Off-highway tires have six categories of service C compactor, E earthmover, G grader, L loader, LS log-skidder and ML mining and logging. Within these service categories are various tread types designed for use on hard-packed surface, soft surface and rock. Since tires are a large expense on any construction project, careful consideration should be given to prevent excessive wear or damage.

== Heavy equipment operator ==
A heavy equipment operator drives and operates heavy equipment used in engineering and construction projects. Typically only skilled workers may operate heavy equipment, and there is specialized training for learning to use heavy equipment.

Much publication about heavy equipment operators focuses on improving safety for such workers. The field of occupational medicine researches and makes recommendations about safety for these and other workers in safety-sensitive positions.

== Equipment cost ==
Due to the small profit margins on construction projects it is important to maintain accurate records concerning equipment utilization, repairs and maintenance. The two main categories of equipment costs are ownership cost and operating cost.

=== Ownership cost ===
To classify as an ownership cost an expense must have been incurred regardless of if the equipment is used or not. These costs are as follows:

- purchase expense
- salvage value
- tax savings from depreciation
- major repairs and overhauls
- property taxes
- insurance
- storage

Depreciation can be calculated several ways, the simplest is the straight-line method. The annual depreciation is constant, reducing the equipment value annually. The following are simple equations paraphrased from the Peurifoy & Schexnayder text:

m = some year in the future

N = equipment useful life (years)

and D_{n} = Annual depreciation amount

D_{n} = purchase price / N

Book value (BV) in year m

BV_{m} = purchase price – (m x D_{n})

example:

N = 5

purchase price = $350,000

m = 3 years from now

BV_{3} = $350,000 – ( 3 x $350,000/5) = $140,000

=== Operating cost ===
For an expense to be classified as an operating cost, it must be incurred through use of the equipment. These costs are as follows:

- F.O.G.
  - Fuel
  - Oil: lubricants, lube oils, filters (oil, air, fuel, hydraulic)
  - Grease
- repairs
  - repair parts
  - repair labor
- tires
- 3rd party service contract
- replacement of high-wear items

The biggest distinction from a cost standpoint is if a repair is classified as a major repair or a minor repair. A major repair can change the depreciable equipment value due to an extension in service life, while a minor repair is normal maintenance. How a firm chooses to cost major and minor repairs vary from firm to firm depending on the costing strategies being used. Some firms will charge only major repairs to the equipment while minor repairs are costed to a project. Another common costing strategy is to cost all repairs to the equipment and only frequently replaced wear items are excluded from the equipment cost. Many firms keep their costing structure closely guarded as it can impact the bidding strategies of their competition. In a company with multiple semi-independent divisions, the equipment department often wants to classify all repairs as "minor" and charge the work to a job – therefore improving their 'profit' from the equipment.

== Models ==
Die-cast metal promotional scale models of heavy equipment are often produced for each vehicle to give to prospective customers. These are typically in 1:50 scale. The popular manufacturers of these models are Conrad and NZG in Germany, even for US vehicles.

== Notable manufacturers ==
The largest 10 heavy equipment manufacturers according to Yellow Table 2025

No.	Company	Country	Sales (billion USD)	Share of total
1	Caterpillar	United States	37,8	15.9%
2	Komatsu	Japan	26,6	11.2%
3	John Deere	United States	12,9	5.5%
4	XCMG	China	12,7	5.4%
5	Liebherr	Switzerland	12,4	5.2%
6	Sany	China	10,8	4.6%
7	Hitachi Construction Machinery	Japan	9,1	3.8%
8	Volvo Construction Equipment	Sweden	8,3	3.5%
9	JCB	United Kingdom	7,4	3.1%
10	Sandvik	Sweden	6,9	2.9%

Other manufacturers include:

- Anhui Heli
- Atlas Copco
- BEML Limited
- Bobcat Company
- Case Construction Equipment
- Chelyabinsk Tractor Plant
- CNH Global
- Demag
- Fiatallis
- HD Construction Equipment
- HEPCO
- HIAB
- Hidromek
- Ingersoll Rand
- Kubota
- Kobelco
- LiuGong
- MARAIS
- Navistar International Corporation
- NCK
- New Holland
- Track Marshall
- Orenstein and Koppel GmbH (O&K)
- Paccar
- Poclain
- Rototilt
- Shantui
- ST Kinetics
- Takeuchi Manufacturing
- Wacker Neuson
- Yanmar
- Zoomlion

== Heavy Equipment Manufacturers by country ==
The largest heavy equipment manufacturers by country

Country	Company
China	Anhui Heli
China	Sany
China	XCMG
India	ACE
India	BEML
India	Bull Machines
Iran	HEPCO
Japan	Hitachi Construction Machinery
Japan	Komatsu
Russia	Chelyabinsk Tractor Plant
South Korea	HD Construction Equipment
Sweden	Atlas Copco
Sweden	HIAB
Sweden	Sandvik
Sweden	Volvo Construction Equipment
Switzerland	Liebherr
United Kingdom	JCB
United States	Bobcat Company
United States	Caterpillar
United States	John Deere

== See also ==
- Associated Equipment Distributors, the trade association for heavy equipment distributors
- Construction equipment theft
- List of construction occupations
- List of tools and equipment
- Non-road engine
