= HD Hyundai Robotics =

South Korean robotics company

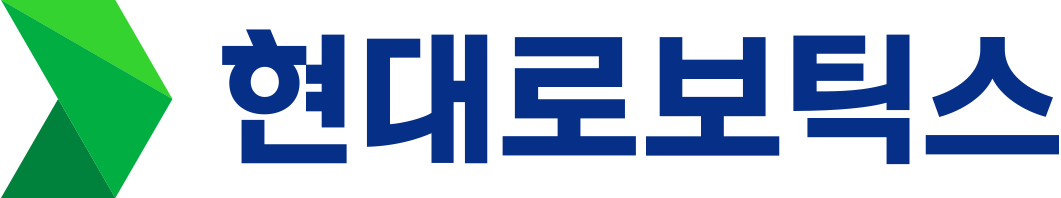
- Native name: 에이치디현대로보틱스 주식회사
- Type: Public
- Industry: Robotics
- Founded: May 1, 2020; 6 years ago
- Headquarters: Dalseong County, Daegu, South Korea
- Key people: Kim Wan-su
- Parent: HD Hyundai
- Website: www.hyundai-robotics.com

HD Hyundai Robotics (Korean: HD현대로보틱스) is a South Korean robotics company founded in 2020. Its headquarters is located in Dalseong County, Daegu.

== History ==
In October 1984, Hyundai Group established a robot business team at Hyundai Heavy Industries to directly manufacture robots needed for the production of Hyundai Motor Company. It developed robots for automobile manufacturing and Liquid-crystal display transport. In 2016, the It was upgraded from Hyundai Heavy Industries Engine Machinery Division to Hyundai Heavy Industries Robot Division, and became an independent corporation in 2020. In 2023, the company name was changed to the current name, HD Hyundai Robotics.

== Product ==
Over the 30 years since its establishment, the company has sold approximately 52,000 industrial robots to automakers and vendors. The company mainly develops and produces multi-joint robots that can perform welding and assembly work in industrial sites. It sells approximately 4,000 industrial robots annually. In addition, 40 types of robots, including Industrial, service robots and flat-panel display robots, are produced at the Daegu factory where the headquarters is located. The main customers are companies in the automobile, metal/machine, electrical/electronic, and food service industries.

About 90% of the company's total sales come from industrial robots such as the HS220. Since 2019, the company have been producing service robots such as serving robots, quarantine robots, and cleaning robots. The company jointly developed 'UNI', a mobile service robot equipped with voice recognition technology, with KT and installed it in hotels in Seoul, South Korea.

== Factory ==
The Smart Factory, located in Dalseong County, Daegu, has an area of 26,214 m^{2}. The number of robots that can be produced by the robots in the factory is approximately 10,000 units per year.

In 2022, a production corporation was established in Jiangsu, China, and annual industrial robot production began in March 2023. Annual production volume is 3,000 units.
