= Bucket (machine part) =

Specialized bulk material handling container attached to a machine

A bucket (also called a scoop to qualify shallower designs of tools) is a specialized container attached to a machine, as compared to a bucket adapted for manual use by a human being. It is a bulk material handling component.

The bucket has an inner volume as compared to other types of machine attachments like blades or shovels.

The bucket could be attached to the lifting hook of a crane, at the end of the arm of an excavating machine, to the wires of a dragline excavator, to the arms of a power shovel or a tractor equipped with a backhoe loader or to a loader, or to a dredge.

The name "bucket" may have been coined from buckets used in water wheels, or used in water turbines or in similar-looking devices.

== Purposes ==
Buckets in mechanical engineering can have a distinct quality from the traditional bucket (pail) whose purpose is to contain things. Larger versions of this type of bucket equip bucket trucks to contain human beings, buckets in water-hauling systems in mines or, for instance, in helicopter buckets to hold water to combat fires.

Two other types of mechanical buckets can be distinguished according to the final destination of the device they equip: energy-consumer systems like excavators or energy-capturer systems like water bucket wheels or turbines.

== Size and shape ==
Buckets exist in a variety of sizes or shapes. They can be quite large like those equipping Hulett cranes, used to discharge ore out of cargo ships in harbours or very small such as those used by deep-sea exploration vehicles.

The shape of the bucket can vary from the truncated conical shape of an actual bucket to more scoop-like or spoon-like shapes akin to water turbines. The cross section can be round or square.

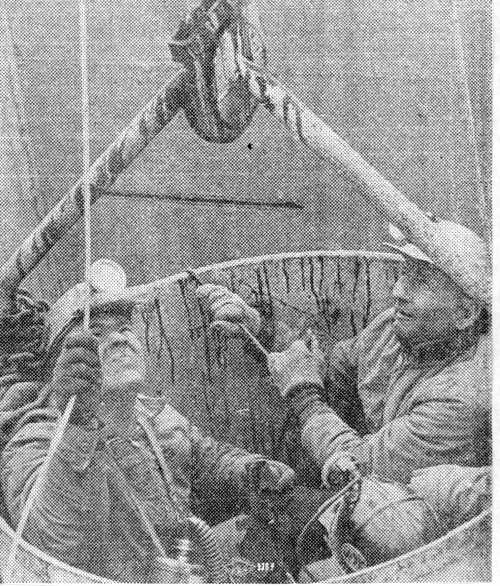
Three miners are extracted during the Farmington Mine disaster, in a bucket attached to a crane

== Designs ==
=== Simple design ===
This is the same shape of a domestic form, the one-piece-standing single element, but often with an augmented size.

==== Mining ====
In early developments of mining, a large simple bucket allowed easy insertion of both miners and construction materials such as pit props, and later extraction of miners and ore. Common terms used in various parts of the world include: Bowk; Kibble; Hoppit; Hoppet. Latterly they have been called sinking buckets, as they are now only used when sinking new mine shafts before insertion of the cage, or for emergency rescue.

==== Concrete bucket ====
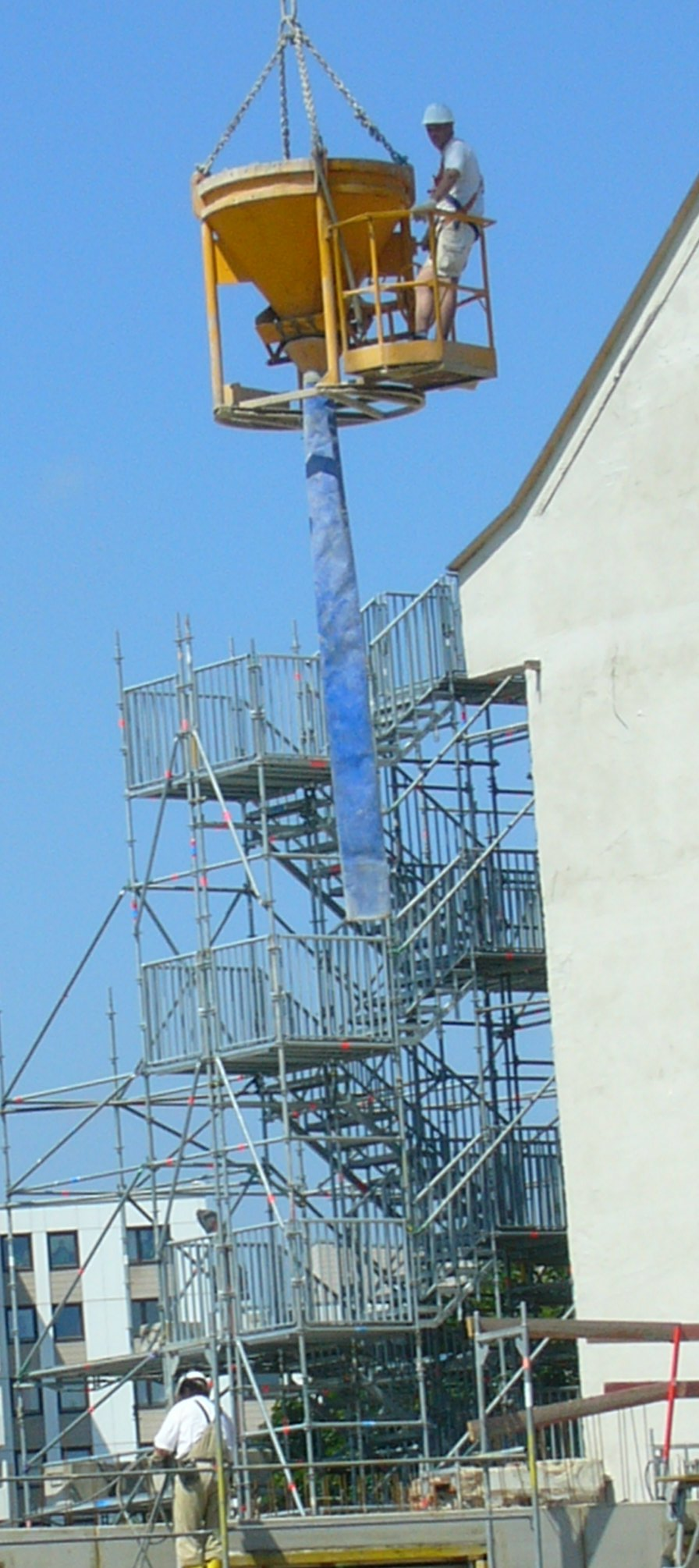
Concrete bucket on a crane

A concrete bucket delivers concrete by means of a tower crane. It has a bottom opening to allow concrete to flow out when in-place. See also tremie.

==== Boom truck bucket ====
A boom truck (or “bucket truck”) bucket is an aerial work platform placed at the end of an excavator-like arm which allows a man to be hoisted to do construction work, such as tree pruning and electrical line maintenance. When necessary the bucket is made out of a non-conductive material for safety. A construction site man lift is a similar apparatus. There may be a door on the side of the bucket in either.

=== Excavator bucket ===
Excavator buckets are made of solid steel and generally present teeth protruding from the cutting edge, to disrupt hard material and avoid wear-and-tear of the bucket. Subsets of the excavator bucket are: the ditching bucket, trenching bucket, A ditching bucket is a wider bucket with no teeth, 5–6 feet (1.52–1.83 m) used for excavating larger excavations and grading stone. A trenching excavator bucket is normally 6 to 24 in (152 to 610 mm) wide and with protruding teeth.

=== Bucket crusher ===
A bucket crusher or crusher bucket is a type of jaw crusher. It's an attached tool for excavators for built-in crushing construction waste and demolition materials.

=== Screening bucket ===
The screening bucket is an attachment for the excavators, loaders, skid steers and backhoe loaders that helps the selection of natural material for different purposes at the jobsite.

=== Clamshell bucket ===
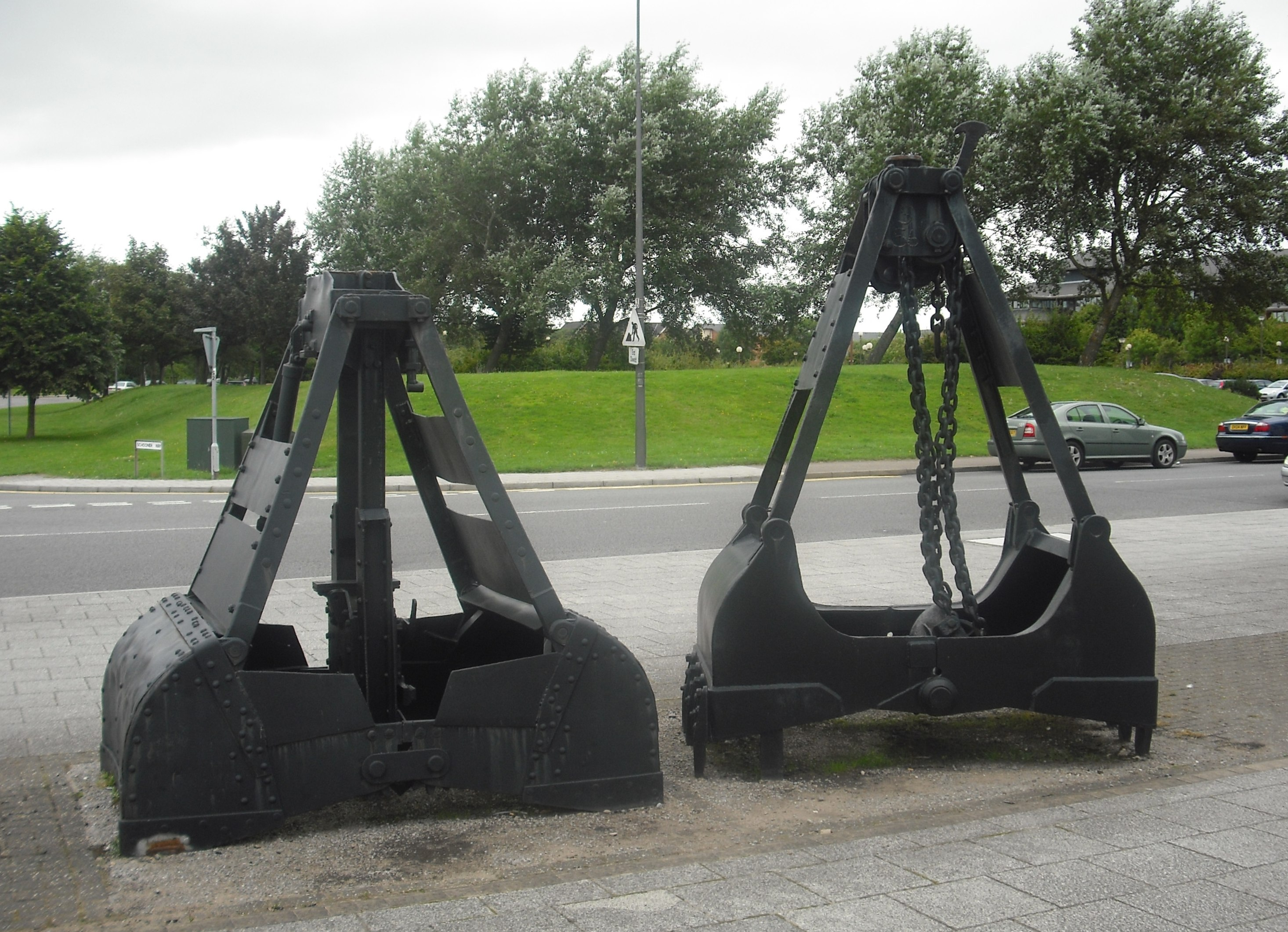
Clamshell buckets from a retired coal-loading crane, now displayed at a dock re-development in Cardiff

The clamshell bucket is a more sophisticated articulated several-piece device, including two elementary buckets associated on a hinged structure forming a claws-like appendage with an internal volume.

=== Buckets-wheel ===
==== In mining ====
The design is used in bucket-wheel excavators. The buckets in the wheel have to be made of solid material to withstand the resistance of the material it cuts through.

==== In energy production ====
The bucket wheel design is also used to capture the water energy in water-wheels or water turbines like Pelton wheels. The buckets also have to be made of solid material to withstand the force of the water flow. Their shape is optimized according to their purpose. Other designs include vertical shaft wind turbines designs like on the Savonius wind turbine. In this case, the buckets have to be made of a light material.

=== Buckets-ladders (buckets-chains) ===
The buckets-ladders are used in bucket elevators or in the dredge design of some dredgers.

== Images ==
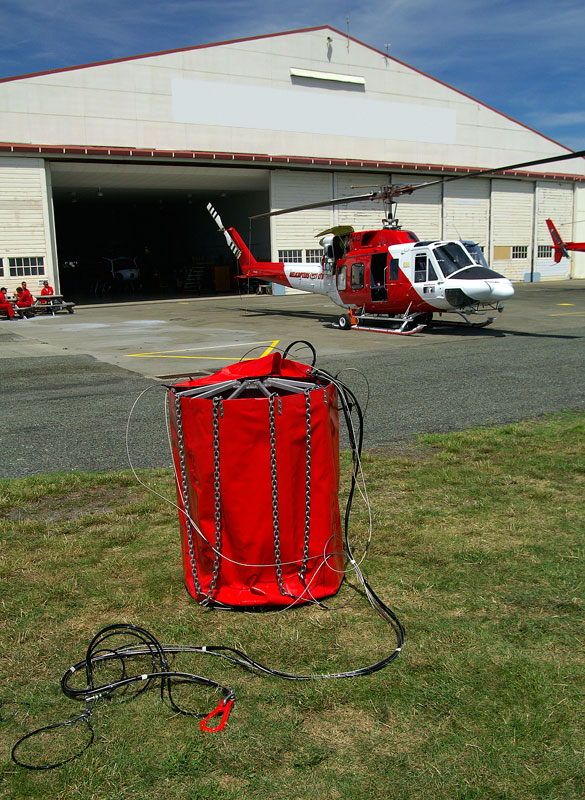
Helicopter bucket made of canvas

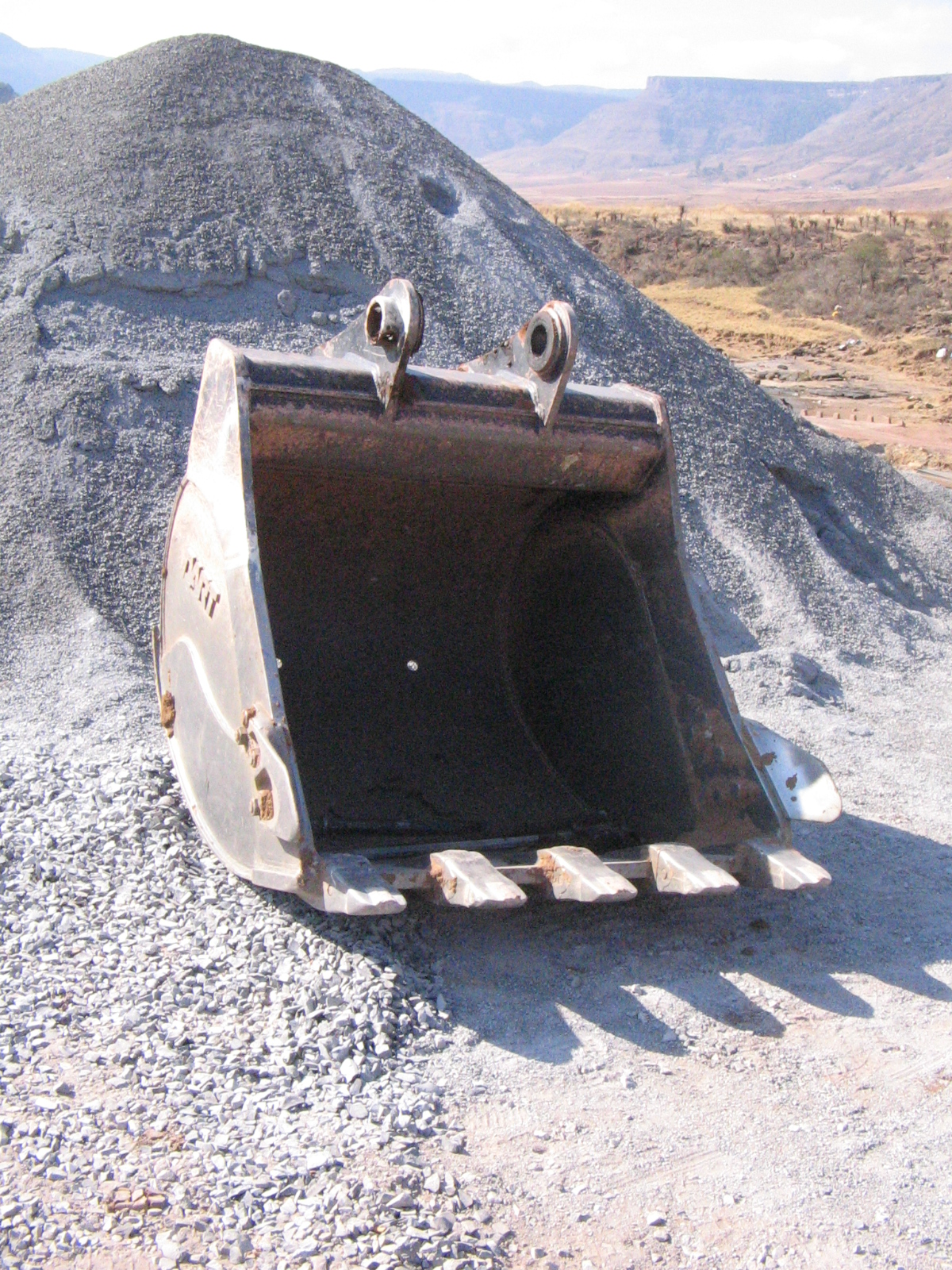
An excavator bucket

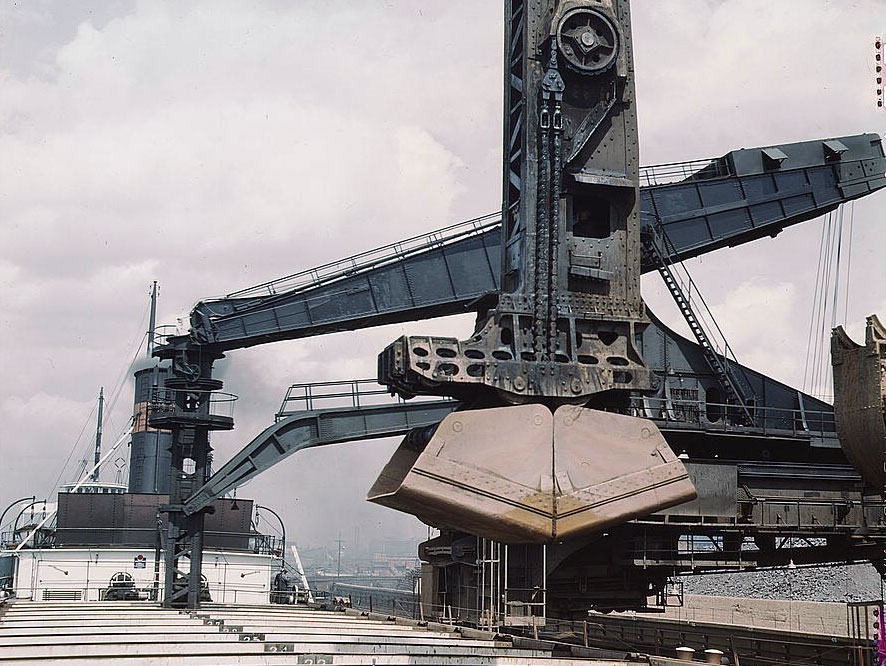
Hulett crane bucket

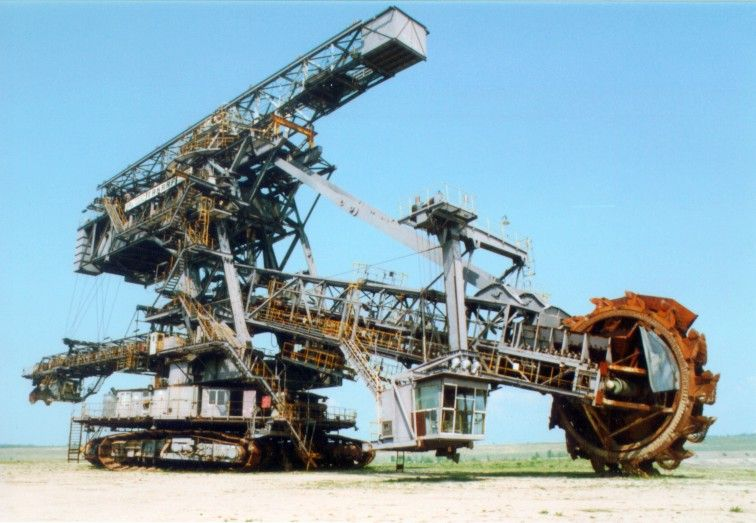
Bucket wheel on a bucket-wheel excavator

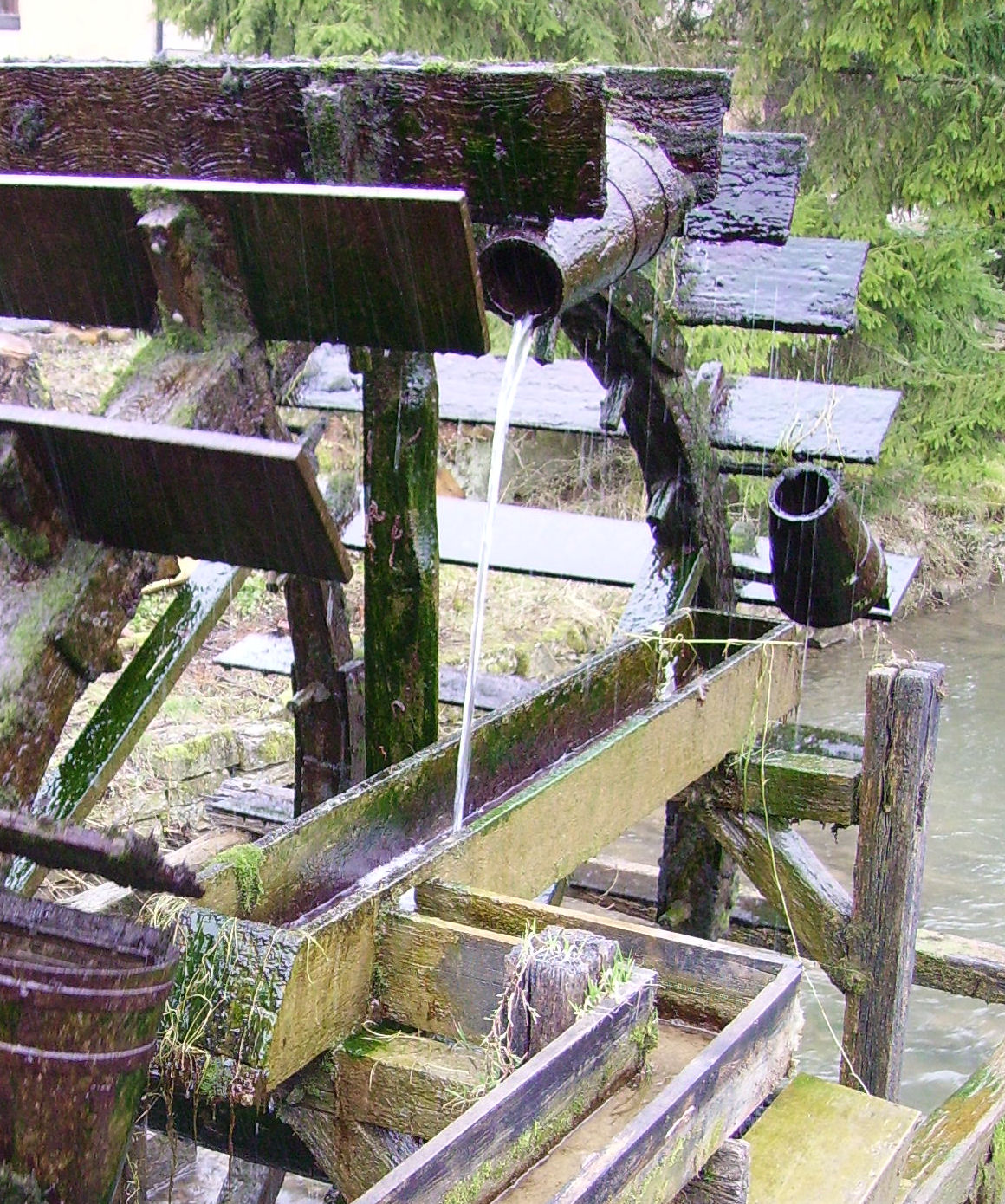
Bucket wheel detail showing actual buckets use

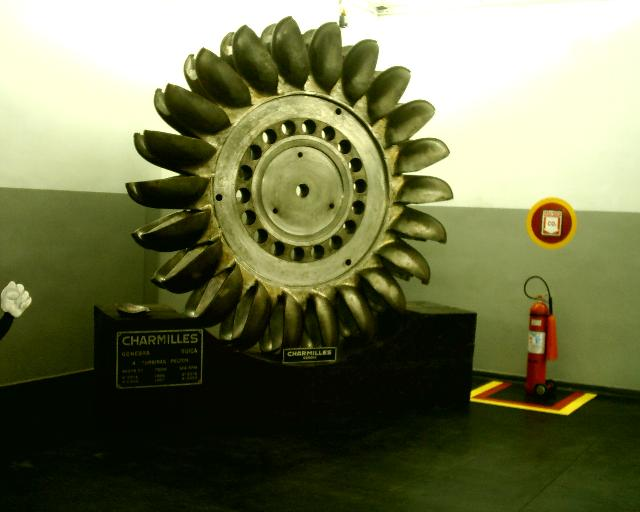
Pelton wheel

Savonius wind turbine with two scoops

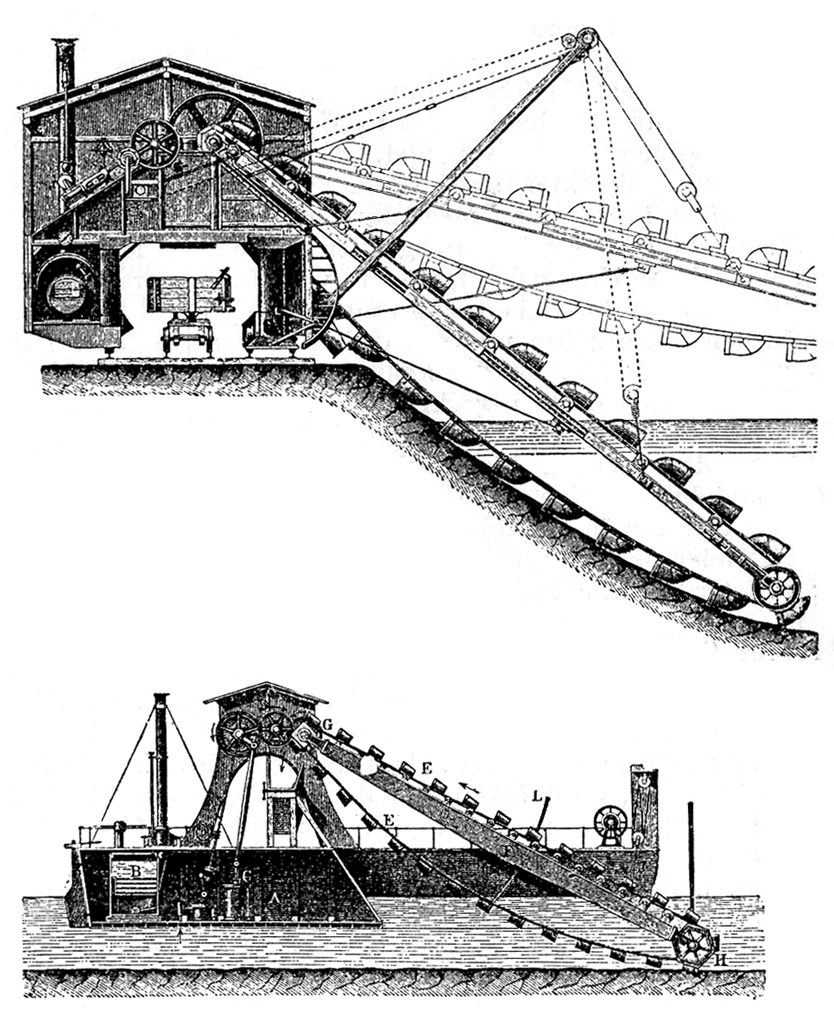
Bucket ladder on a dredge

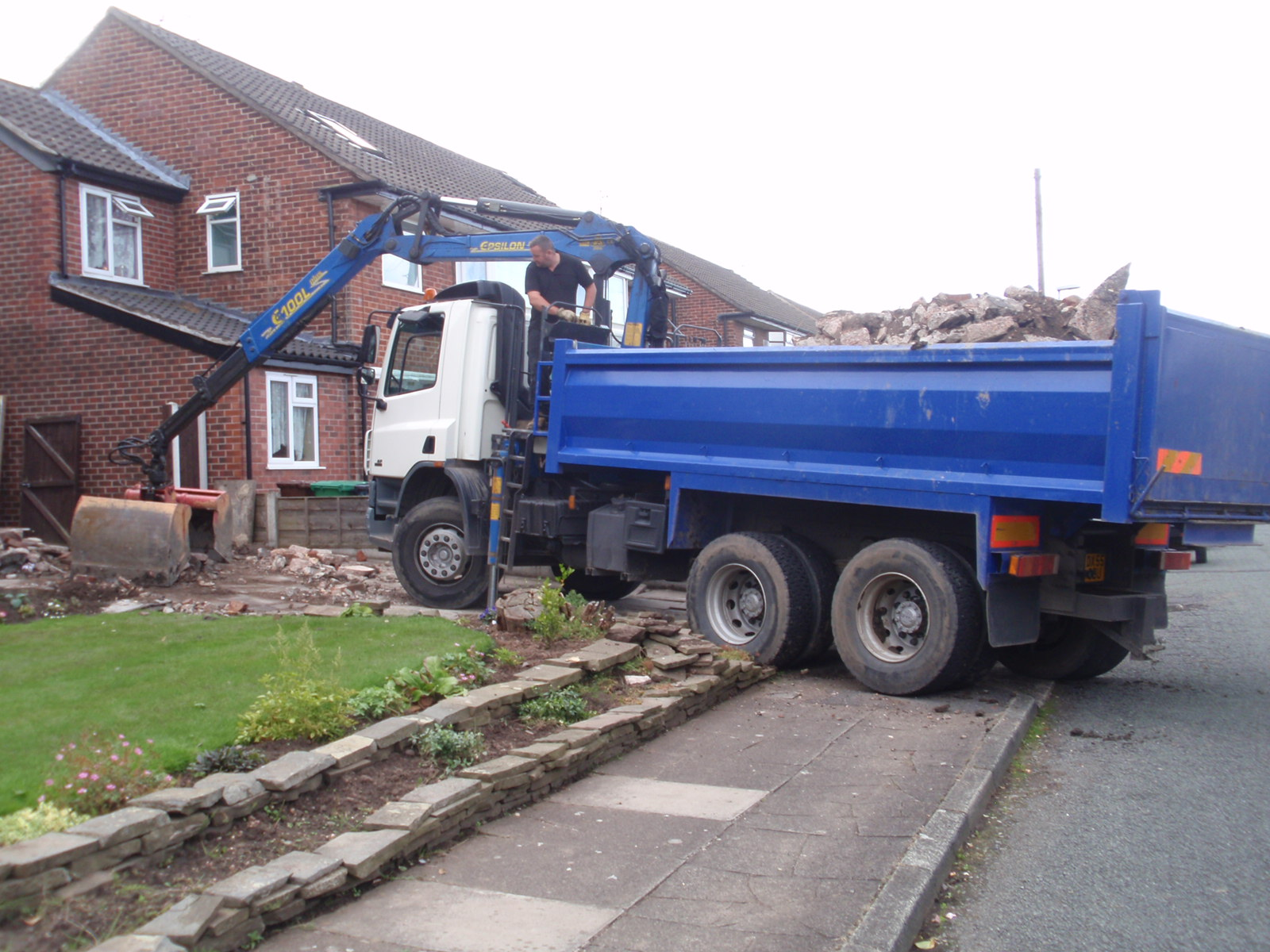
Truck with clamshell grab on arm, south Manchester, England, 27 July 2009

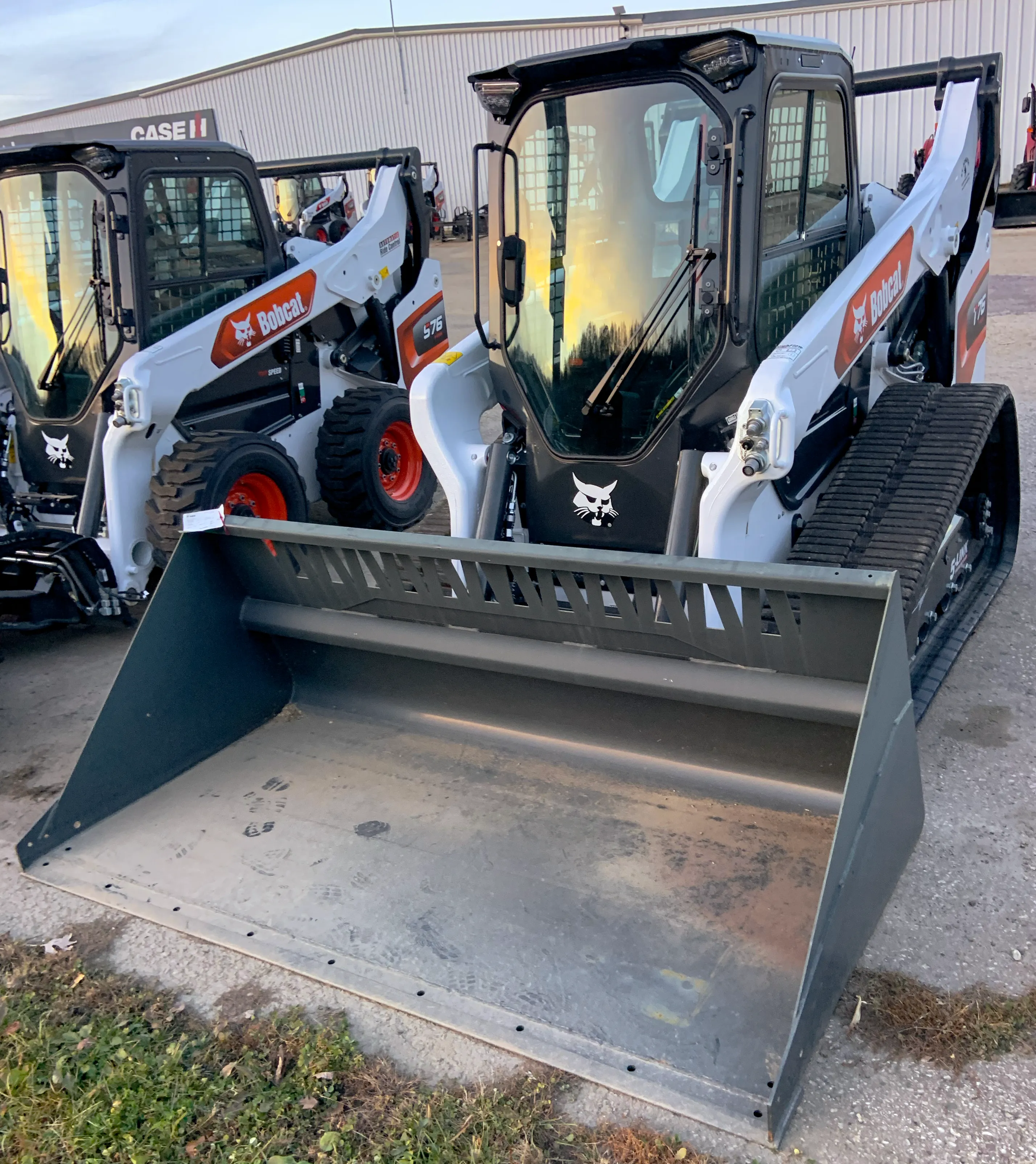
Bobcat skid-steer bucket
