= Jaques Limited =

- Predecessor: Phillips and Jaques
- Founded: 1888
- Founder: Edward Jaques
- Defunct: 1999
- Fate: acquired by Clyde Industries Ltd
- Successor: Jaques Terex
- Headquarters: Melbourne, Australia
- Key people: Edward Jaques, Wallace Jaques, Edwin Phillips

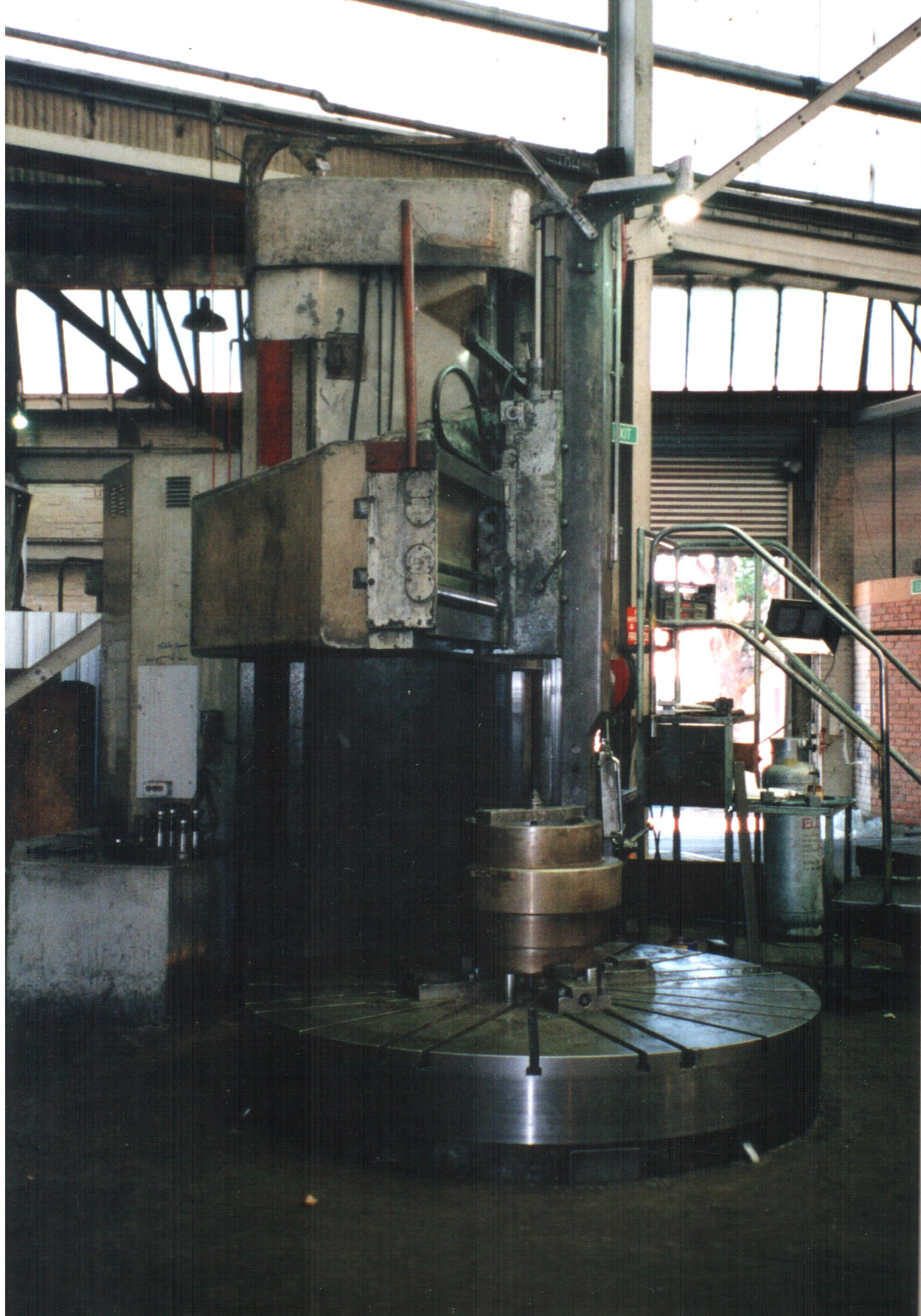
Vertical boring machine at the southern end of the fitting shop

Jaques Limited was an engineering manufacturing company based in Melbourne, Australia, which was founded by Edward Jaques in 1888.

Jaques' family had fled Revolutionary France and eventually immigrated to Australia in 1876. In 1885 Edward finished his engineering apprenticeship in Melbourne prior to forming a company with Edwin Phillips as Phillips and Jaques, producing rock crushers for quarries. The partnership was dissolved in 1888 and Edward went into partnership with his brother Wallace in 1917 as Jaques Brothers Proprietary Limited. Jaques Brothers became a public company in 1949, and on 22 March 1973 it changed its name to Jaques Limited. It was taken over by Clyde Industries Ltd on 19 September 1979.

The firm became a world leader in the design and manufacture of stone crushers as well as producing road making machinery and excavators.

In 1979 Jaques produced the tunnel boring machine known as the mole, used in construction of the Melbourne Underground Rail Loop under the supervision of managing director Jack Keegan, from design drawings acquired from Italy.

In 2001, Jaques was absorbed by the Terex Corporation.

The main manufacturing plant in Palmer Street Richmond was sold in 1997, and the site redeveloped as a residential and commercial area under the name as Jaques Richmond.

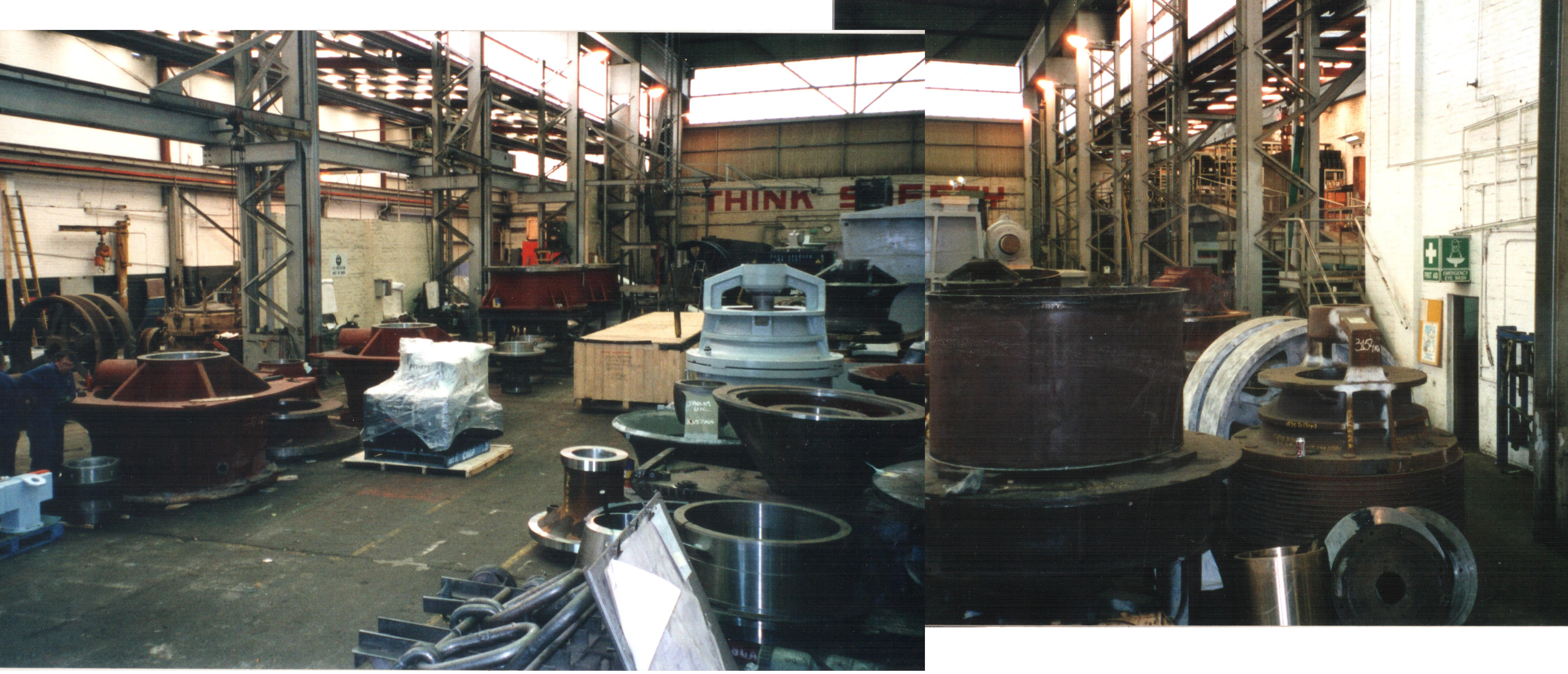
Main fitting shop facing north
