= Bucket crusher =

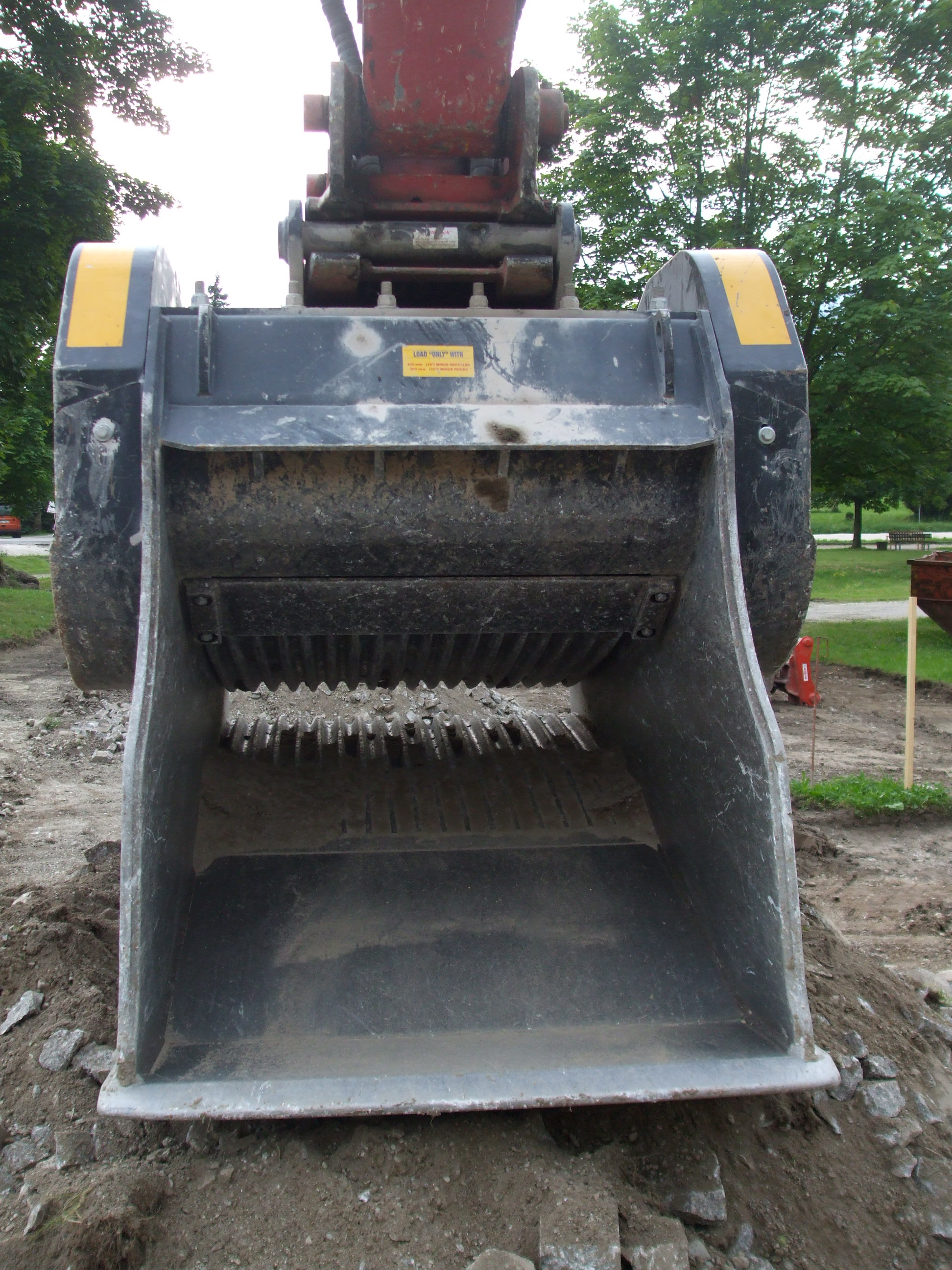
Bucket crusher from inside

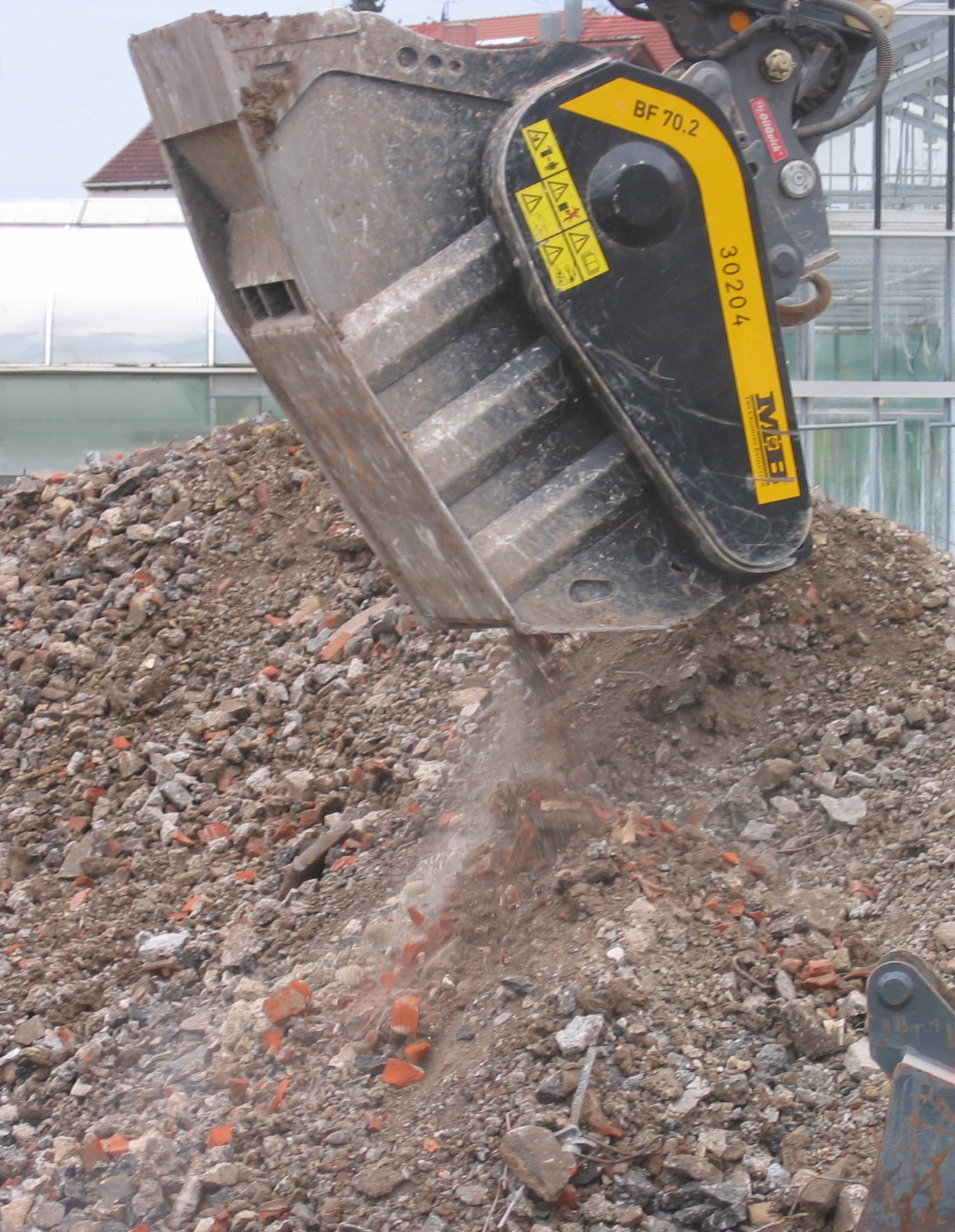
Excavator with attached bucket crusher breaking demolished walls.

A bucket crusher or crusher bucket is a type of jaw crusher. It's an attached tool for excavators for built-in crushing construction waste and demolition materials. It has the design of a shovel, which is open at the rear for releasing the shredded material. Compared to normal jaw crushers, The jaw crusher bucket has a lower production, but can be transported more easily and only needs an excavator to operate.

The jaws are driven by hydraulically actuated eccentrics which crush material to a desired particle size. Bucket crushers are primarily employed in mining and demolition for the breaking-down of crude minerals, concrete and masonry.

During the crushing process, the crusher bucket is positioned vertically so that the crushed material can be released. The jaw bucket works with the hydraulic system of the excavator. The hoses to the excavator, for intake and drain the oil are connected directly to the crusher bucket. A hydraulic valve block regulates the oil flow and the oil pressure to the correct amount of the hydraulic motor leave. The movement is transferred to one of the two crushing jaws, the other stops.

Crusher buckets can differ in size and weight (1,500–5,620 kilograms (3,310–12,390 lb)) and volume (0.5–1.05 cubic metres (18–37 cu ft)). The distance between the crushing jaws can range from 970 to 1,650 millimetres (38 to 65 in).

Most patents on bucket crushers were filed in the mid 1990s, expiring around the year 2020.
