= Lee family (Samsung Group) =

Family descended from the founders of Samsung

- Business family
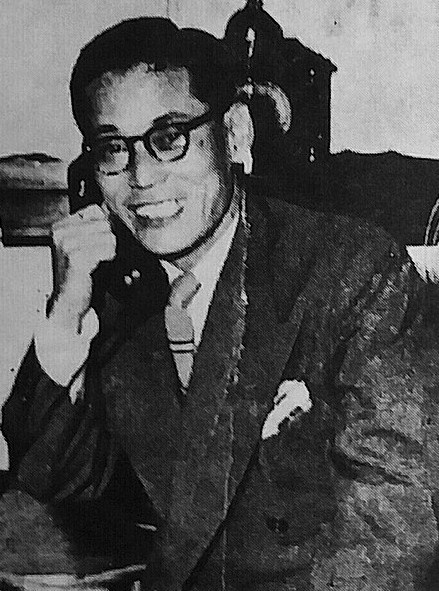
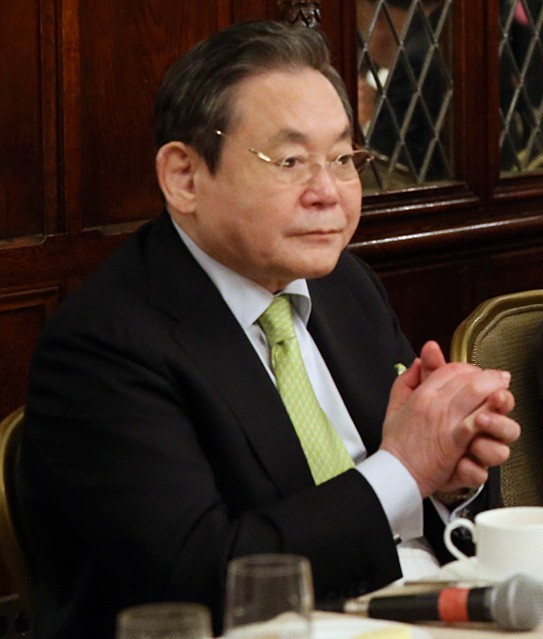
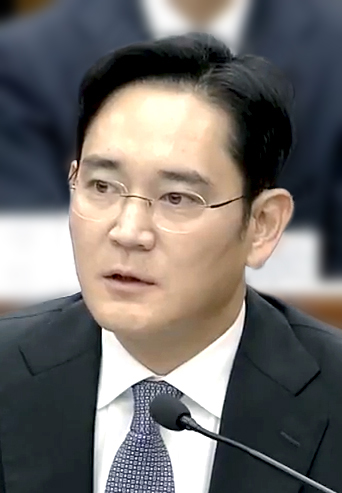
- Lee Byung-chul Lee Kun-hee Lee Jae-yong
- Parent family: Gyeongju Yi; Lee Byung-chul (agnatic); Suncheon Park; Park Du-eul (enatic)
- Current region: Seoul, South Korea
- Origin: Taikyu, Korea, Empire of Japan
- Founded: 1938
- Founder: Lee Byung-chul, 1st Chairman of Samsung Group
- Current head: Lee Jae-yong, 3rd Chairman of Samsung Group
- Distinctions: Controlling shareholders of Samsung Group

The Lee family, also known as the Lee Samsung family, is a wealthy South Korean business family. The family rose to prominence with Lee Byung-chul, who started Samsung as a small trading company in Daegu during the Korea under Japanese rule in 1938 and went on to grow Samsung into one of South Korea's biggest companies since the 1960s. It is one of the wealthiest families in Asia and the wealthiest in South Korea.

== Overview ==
The Lee family has exercised controlling influence over Samsung for three generations. Following the death of founder Lee Byung-chul in 1987, leadership passed to his son Lee Kun-hee, who is widely credited with transforming Samsung into a global leader in electronics, semiconductors, and mobile technology. In 2012, some family members, including elder siblings, filed lawsuits against Lee Kun-hee claiming portions of what he received in inheritance. The court ruled in favor of Lee Kun-hee. After Lee Kun-hee's death in 2020, control transitioned to his son Lee Jae-yong.

The Lee family's control over Samsung is maintained through a complex network of cross-shareholdings among affiliated companies rather than direct majority ownership.

In 2025, various members resided in Seoul's Itaewon-ro corridor.

In 2026, the family completed its payment of 12 trillion won (roughly 6 billion British pounds or 8 billion US dollars) in inheritance taxes, the largest collection in South Korea's history. The taxes was paid in six instalments over the prior 5 years by the members of the family such as Hong Ra-hee, Lee Boo-jin and Lee Seo-hyun. Their inheritance upon Lee Kun-hee's passing was worth 26 trillion won, including shares, property and art collections. The rate the family paid for inheritance taxes was 50%, one of the largest in the world.

== Members' fortune ==
The Lee family's direct members include, as of January 2026:

Name	Net worth ($)	Ref.
Lee Jae-yong	18.2 billion	
Hong Ra-hee	8 billion	
Lee Boo-jin	7.5 billion	
Lee Seo-hyun	7 billion	

Notable members also include Hong Seok-joh, Chung Yong-jin, Hong Seok-hyun, Lee Myung-hee, and Lee Jay-hyun.

== Family tree ==
Incomplete members of Samsung family

Lee Byung-chul	Park Du-eul
Lee In-hee	Lee Kun-hee	Hong Ra-hee	Lee Myung-hee
Lee Jae-yong	Lee Boo-jin	Lee Seo-hyun	Lee Yoon-hyung
