= Jeongdo Hong =

South Korean media executive and journalist

Hong Jeong-do
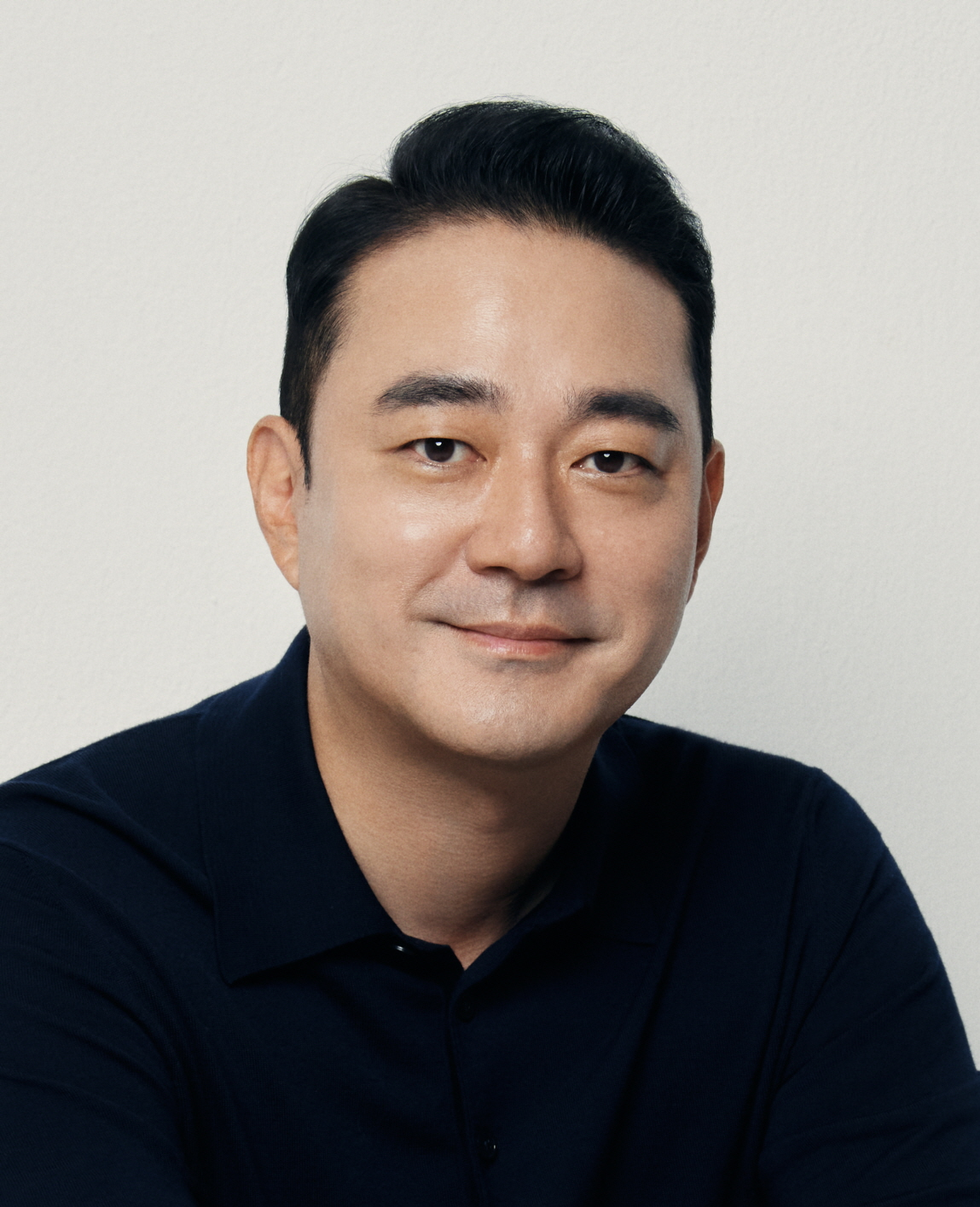
- Born: November 11, 1977 (age 48); Washington, D.C., U.S.
- Education: Wesleyan University (BA); Stanford University (MBA)
- Occupations: Vice Chairman of JoongAng Holdings; CDXO of JoongAng Ilbo & JTBC
- Parent(s): Hong Seok-hyun (Father), Shin Yun-gyun (Mother)
- Relatives: Hong Jeong-hyun (Sister), Hong Jeong-in (Brother), Lee Kun-hee (Uncle & late chairman of Samsung), Hong Ra-hee (Aunt & spouse of Lee Kun-hee), Lee Jae-yong (Cousin), Lee Boo-jin (Cousin), Lee Seo-hyun (Cousin)

Korean name
- Hangul: 홍정도
- Hanja: 洪正道
- RR: Hong Jeongdo
- MR: Hong Chŏngdo

Hong Jeong-do (born November 11, 1977) is a South Korean media executive and journalist. He holds several positions at the JoongAng Group, overseeing business sectors. As the CEO of JoongAng Group, he leads seven business divisions, including newspapers, broadcasting, content studio, multiplexes, resorts, sports, and magazines. These divisions include JoongAng Ilbo, JTBC, SLL, Megabox, Phoenix Hotels & Resorts, JTBC Golf, and HLL. Hong Jeong-do holds the titles of CEO and Vice Chairman of JoongAng Holdings. Additionally, he serves as the Vice Chairman of JoongAng Ilbo and JTBC. He also holds the position of Chief Digital Transformation Officer (CDXO).

== Life and education ==
Born on November 11, 1977, Hong Jeong-do is the eldest son of Hong Seok-hyun, who holds the position of Chairman at JoongAng Holdings. He started college as a history major at Yonsei University and completed a bachelor's degree in economics at Wesleyan University. He obtained a master's degree in business administration from Stanford University. His career began in 2005 when he joined the Strategic Planning Office of JoongAng Ilbo. By 2014, he became CEO and President at JoongAng Media Network (JMnet, precursor of JoongAng Holdings), JoongAng Ilbo, and JTBC. He held the position of publisher of JoongAng Ilbo from 2018 to 2022. In October 2021, he was appointed as the Vice Chairman and CEO of JoongAng Holdings, JoongAng Ilbo, and JTBC. He also serves as the Chief Digital and Transformation Officer (CDXO) of JoongAng Ilbo and JTBC.

== JTBC's inception ==
In 2010, Hong Jeong-do oversaw strategic planning at JMnet's broadcasting division. On December 31 of that year, JMnet won first place in a selection process for general programming channel operators conducted by the Korea Communications Commission. This marked the revival of TBC (Tongyang Broadcasting Company), a leading commercial broadcaster in Korea during the 1960s and 1970s. TBC was forced to cease operations in 1980 in the then military government's efforts to consolidate media. JTBC began broadcasting on December 1, 2011. In 2016, JTBC Newsroom broke a story on government affairs that led to the impeachment of Park Geun-hye. For five consecutive years, Sisa Journal named JTBC the 'Most Trusted Media'. JTBC produced dramas including 'SKY Castle', 'The World of the Married', 'Reborn Rich', and 'Doctor Cha', as well as entertainment shows such as 'Hidden Singer,' 'Phantom Singer,' 'Ask Us Anything,' and 'A Clean Sweep.'

== Merger and acquisition of Megabox ==
In 2011, under Hong's leadership, the multiplex chains Megabox and Cinus merged. In 2015, Megabox acquired the remaining 50% stake previously held by Korea Multiplex Investment (KMIC). This gave JoongAng Group complete ownership. The acquisition marked JoongAng Group's entry into the entertainment industry. Megabox expanded into production, investment, and distribution, with projects including 'Hunt' and 'The Roundup'.

== First non-terrestrial broadcaster to secure Olympic broadcasting rights ==
In 2019, JTBC became the first non-terrestrial broadcaster in South Korea to secure broadcasting rights for the Olympic Games. The deal was signed by Hong Jeong-do and IOC President Thomas Bach in Lausanne, Switzerland. The agreement covers the 2026 to 2032 Winter and Summer Olympics. In 2020, JTBC Studio emerged as an independent content production entity, separating from JTBC. In 2021, it reported sales of 558.8 billion won and an operating profit of 15 billion won. In 2022, JTBC Studio rebranded as SLL. SLL expanded beyond captive content such as 'Reborn Rich,' producing content for platforms such as Netflix, including 'The Sound of Magic,' 'Money Heist: Korea - Joint Economic Zone,' 'Narco-Saints,' and content for Disney+, including 'Big Bet.'

== Global activities ==
Vice Chairman Hong is a member of the World Association of News Publishers (WAN-IFRA) Asia Pacific Committee and the Friends of the Asia Foundation Korea Board of Directors, and is a member of the Royal & Ancient Golf Club of St Andrews. He was named a Young Global Leader by the World Economic Forum (WEF) in 2010.
