= Kim Jae-youl =

South Korean sports administrator (born 1968)

- 김재열
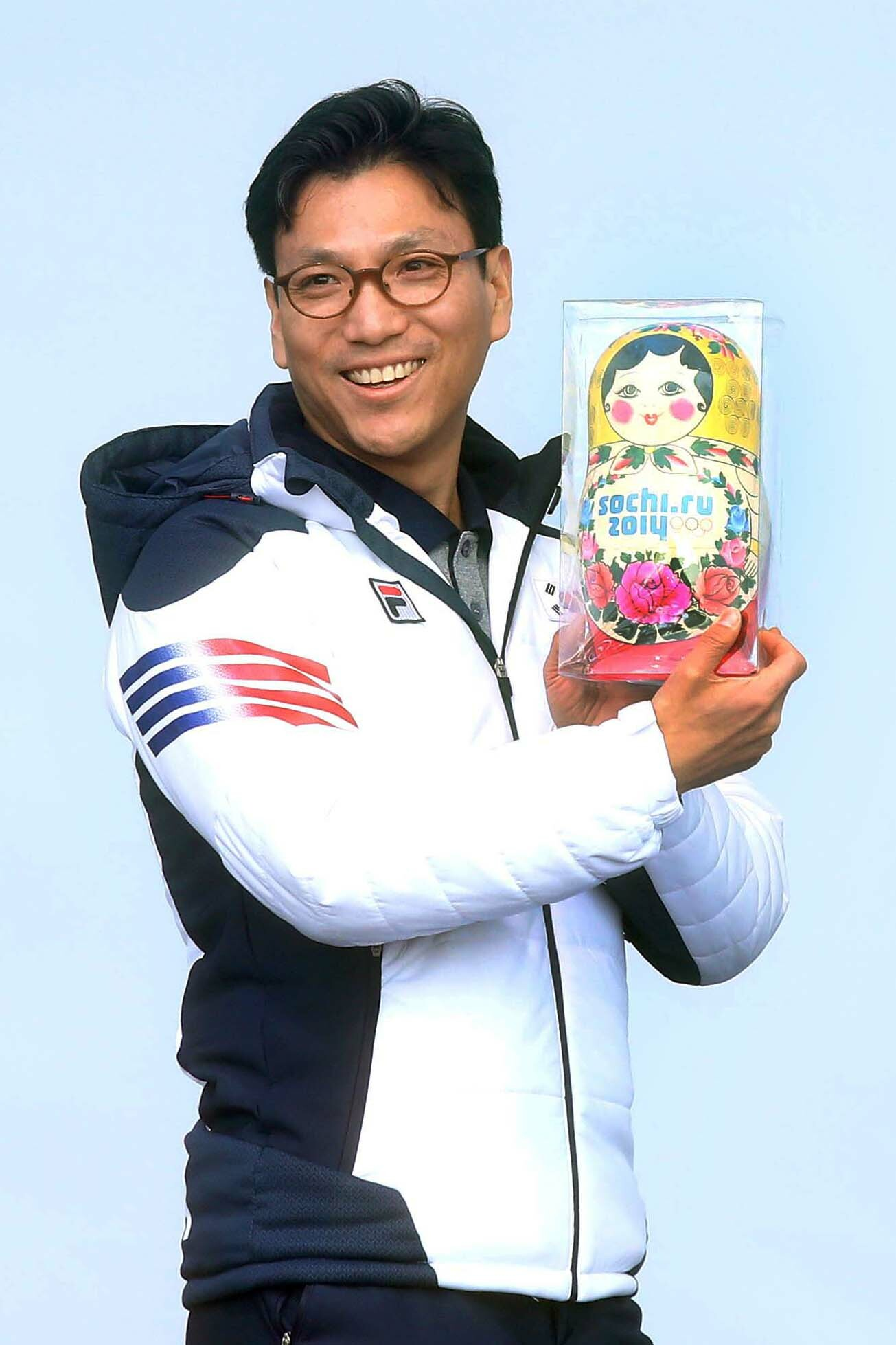

12th President of the International Skating Union
- Incumbent
- Assumed office 10 June 2022
- Preceded by: Jan Dijkema

Personal details
- Born: 14 October 1968 (age 58)
- Spouse: Lee Seo-hyun (m. 2000)
- Children: 4
- Education: Wesleyan University; Johns Hopkins University; Stanford University

Korean name
- Hangul: 김재열
- Hanja: 金載烈
- RR: Gim Jaeyeol
- MR: Kim Chaeyŏl

Kim Jae-youl (Korean: 김재열; born 14 October 1968) is a South Korean sports administrator. He has served as the twelfth president of the International Skating Union since 2022 and has been a member of the International Olympic Committee since 2023.

== Early life and education ==
Kim was born on 14 October 1968. He is the second son of Kim Byung-kwan, the former chairman of the South Korean daily newspaper The Dong-A Ilbo. Through his father, Kim is the great-grandson of Kim Seong-su, the second Vice President of South Korea.

He attended Cheong-un Middle School, where he was classmates with Chung Yong-jin and future brother-in-law Lee Jae-yong. After winning an art competition hosted by Hankook Ilbo, he attended high school abroad at Northfield Mount Hermon School. Kim completed his undergraduate studies at Wesleyan University, followed by a master's degree in international politics from Johns Hopkins University, and later earned an MBA from Stanford University.

== Career ==
After completing his military service, Kim served as a consultant at Monitor Company for two years before continuing his studies at Stanford University. Kim then worked briefly at eBay from 2000 to 2001 before moving to corporate planning and management at Samsung. He joined Cheil Worldwide in 2002 as an executive before moving to Cheil Industries. There, he held management positions in Strategy Planning and Management Planning. He subsequently moved to Samsung Engineering, serving as President of Management Planning from 2011 to 2014, before returning to Cheil Worldwide as President of Sports Business. In 2018, Kim joined Samsung Economic Research Institute (SERI) as President of Sports Marketing Research. He was appointed Head of Global Strategy at SERI in 2020.

In sports administration, Kim became vice president and later president of the Korea Skating Union between 2010 and 2016. Kim held roles in the Korean Sport & Olympic Committee and participated in organizing major international competitions, including the 2014 Sochi Olympics and the Asian Games. In 2016, he joined the International Olympic Committee's coordination commission for the 2022 Beijing Winter Olympics and became a member of the International Skating Union Council.

In 2022, Kim was elected president of the International Skating Union, making him the first non-European to lead the global governing organization. Kim was elected as a member of the IOC in 2023 through his role as the head of an international federation.

== Personal life ==
Kim is married to Lee Seo-hyun, the second daughter of Lee Kun-hee, the former chairman of Samsung. They married in 2000, and have one son and three daughters together.

== See also ==
- Chaebol

Sporting positions
| Preceded by Jan Dijkema | President of the International Skating Union; 2022– | Succeeded by Incumbent |
