= Lee Seo-hyun =

South Korean billionaire (born 1973)

- 이서현
- Born: September 20, 1973 (age 53)
- Education: Parsons School of Design (graduated 1997)
- Occupations: Businesswoman; fashion designer
- Years active: 2002–present
- Title: President of Samsung C&T Corporation (since 2024)
- Spouse: Kim Jae-youl (m. 2000)
- Children: 4
- Parents: Lee Kun-hee (father); Hong Ra-hee (mother)
- Relatives: Lee Jae-yong (brother); Lee Boo-jin (sister); Lee Yoon-hyung (sister); See list: Lee Byung-chul (paternal grandfather); Hong Jin-ki (maternal grandfather)

Korean name
- Hangul: 이서현
- RR: I Seohyeon
- MR: I Sŏhyŏn

Lee Seo-hyun (Korean: 이서현; born September 20, 1973) is a South Korean businesswoman and fashion designer who served as the president of Samsung C&T Corporation since April 2024. She is the daughter of Samsung Electronics late chairman Lee Kun-hee, and is ranked 4th among the richest people in South Korea, with Forbes estimating her June 2026 net worth as US$14 billion.

== Early life and education ==
Lee was born on September 20, 1973, as the second daughter of Lee Kun-hee. Her paternal grandfather is Lee Byung-chul, founder of Samsung, and her maternal grandfather is businessman and jurist Hong Jin-ki. She graduated from Kyonggi Elementary School, Yewon School, Seoul Arts High School, and the Parsons School of Design (graduated 1997).

== Career ==
In 2002, she joined Cheil Industries as head of a fashion research department. She served as vice president of Cheil Industries until 2013. She was made president of Everland's fashion division at the end of 2013. She was president of Samsung C&T's fashion division from December 2015 until December 2018.

In April 2024, she was made president of Samsung C&T. In 2024, it was reported that she owned 6.23% of Samsung.

== Personal life ==
She has an older brother Lee Jae-yong, older sister Lee Boo-jin and one deceased younger sister Lee Yoon-hyung.

Her husband is Kim Jae-youl (김재열), great-grandson of vice president of South Korea and journalist Kim Seong-su. Since 2019, he has been president of Samsung Global Research (삼성글로벌리서치). They married in 2000, and have one son and three daughters.
