= Samsung Scholarship =

South Korean student scholarship

The Samsung Scholarship was established in 2002 by Samsung to provide financial support, encouragement and opportunities to gifted Korean students pursuing higher education overseas, who have shown the capacity to become global leaders. It was established as the Samsung Lee Kun-hee Scholarship, named after the former chairman (1987~2008) of the Samsung Group who succeeded Lee Byung-chul, the founder.

Samsung Scholarship supports a fellow for the full five academic years (for doctoral track).

Recipients mostly have backgrounds or are working in science, technology, engineering, and mathematics fields. A Samsung Scholar is selected by a rigorous screening system comprising evaluation of the candidate's resume, statement of purpose, academic and research background, experience, and interviews where interviewers are usually renowned scholars, entrepreneurs, current or former government officers invited for this process.
