= Lee Jay-hyun =

South Korean businessman (born 1960)

- Born: March 19, 1960 (age 66)
- Education: Korea University (BA)
- Alma mater: Kyungbock High School
- Occupation: Businessman
- Known for: Chairman of CJ Group
- Children: 2
- Relatives: Lee Byung-chul (grandfather); Miky Lee (sister); Lee Kun-hee (uncle); Lee Myung-hee (aunt); Lee Jae-yong (cousin); Lee Boo-jin (cousin)

Korean name
- Hangul: 이재현
- Hanja: 李在賢
- RR: I Jaehyeon
- MR: I Chaehyŏn

Lee Jay-hyun (Korean: 이재현; born March 19, 1960) is a South Korean businessman. He is the chairman of the CJ Group.

As of April 2025, Forbes estimates his net worth at US$1.1 billion, making him the 23rd richest person in South Korea.

== Biography ==
Lee was born in 1960 as the eldest grandson of the late Samsung founder Lee Byung-chul. His father, Lee Maeng-hee, was the eldest son of Lee Byung-chul who was pushed out of competition in a power struggle with his younger brother and late Samsung Chairman Lee Kun-hee. His sister is CJ vice-chairman Miky Lee.

Lee went to Kyungbock High School and received his bachelor's degree from Korea University. He started his career at Citibank in 1983, and joined the family business at CheilJedang in 1985 at the request of his grandfather. After joining Cheil Jedang in 1985, Lee held management positions before becoming chairman of CJ Group in 2002. He is credited for turning the company into the South Korea's 13th-largest conglomerate.

In 2014, Lee was sentenced to jail for four years and a fine of 26 billion won for tax evasion and embezzlement. He was pardoned by South Korean President Park Geun-hye in 2016.

== Personal life ==
Lee married Kim Heui-jae in 1984 and has one son, Lee Sun-ho, and one daughter, Lee Kyeong-hoo, both of whom graduated from Columbia University. He endowed the Lee Family Scholarship at Columbia College.
