= Miky Lee =

South Korean-American business executive (born 1958)

- 이미경
- Born: April 8, 1958 (age 68); Knoxville, Tennessee, U.S.
- Education: Seoul National University; Harvard University; Fudan University
- Relatives: Lee Jay-hyun (brother); Lee Byung-chul (grandfather)

Mie Kyung Lee (Korean: 이미경; RR: I Migyeong; born 9 April 1958), known by her English name Miky Lee, is a South Korean-American businesswoman and the vice-chairman of CJ Group.

== Early life and education ==
Lee was born in 1958 in Knoxville, Tennessee as the first daughter of Lee Maeng-hee, the eldest son of Samsung founder Lee Byung-chul. She earned a bachelor's degree in home economics at Seoul National University. She obtained a master's degree in East Asian studies from Harvard University in 1986 and later pursued Chinese literature and history studies at Fudan University in Shanghai.

== Career ==
Lee started working at Cheil Jedang in 1994. Prompted by Lee, in 1995 Cheil Jedang became an investor of DreamWorks and obtained rights to distribute all their films throughout Asia, Japan excluded. Lee established CGV and brought the first multiplex to South Korea in 1998.

Lee was a key figure in advancing the careers of South Korean directors Park Chan-wook and Bong Joon-ho. In the 92nd Academy Awards she accepted the Best Picture award as an executive producer for Parasite.

In March 2022, Lee was named Variety's 'International Media Woman of the Year' for her work promoting Korean pop culture.

In July 2025, Lee partnered with Dominic Ng and Janet Yang to oversee a new label called First Light StoryHouse, which dedicated to Asian and Asian American storytelling for major studios and streamers.

== See also ==
- Cinema of South Korea
