= Lee Soo-bin =

South Korean businessman (born 1939)

- Born: January 16, 1939 (age 87); North Gyeongsang Province, South Korea
- Education: Seoul National University
- Occupation: CEO of Samsung Life Insurance

Korean name
- Hangul: 이수빈
- Hanja: 李洙彬
- RR: I Subin
- MR: I Subin

Lee Soo-bin (Korean: 이수빈, born January 16, 1939) is the CEO of Samsung Life Insurance. According to English language wire services, he is "representing Samsung externally", after Samsung Group chairman Lee Kun-hee resigned, on 22 April 2008, as a result of the bribery scandal investigation. He is unrelated to the Lee family of Samsung Group.

Business positions
Preceded by Lee Kun-hee	Chairman of Samsung Group; April 2008 – March 2010	Succeeded by Lee Kun-hee
