= John Sitaras =

American fitness professional (born 1972)

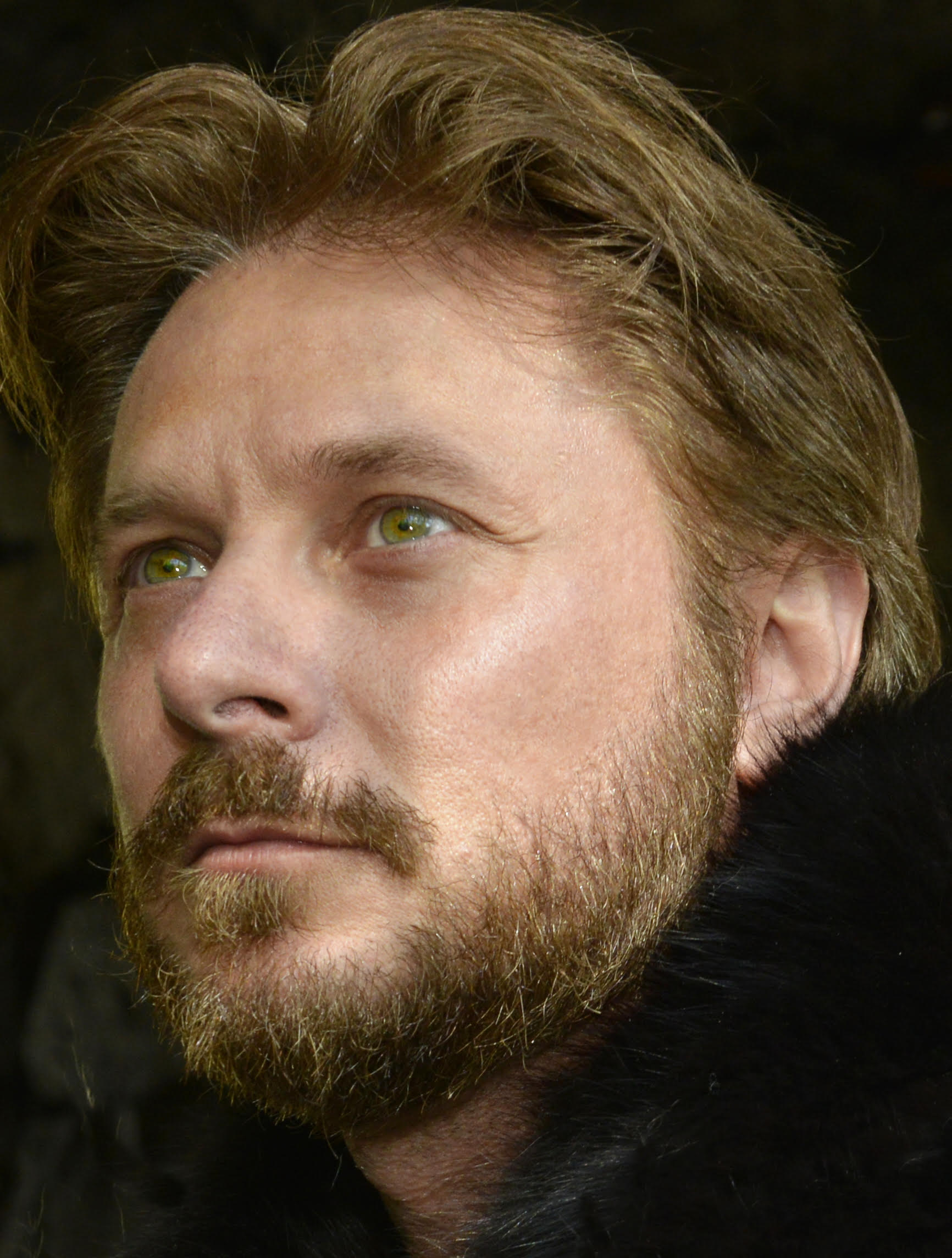
- Sitaras in 2018
- Born: 1972 (age 52–53); Chios, Greece
- Known for: Sitaras Method: personal trainer of several high-profile people
- Website: www.sitarasinc.com

John Sitaras is an American fitness professional, the creator of the Sitaras Method and the founder of Sitaras Fitness in New York City. The method developed by him supposes an initial comprehensive evaluation system similar to a general medical examination, in order to design individualized routines according to each student's genetic aptitude, level of fitness, health conditions, and personal goals. As the students make progress, the evaluation is resumed periodically to reassess the routines and track their physical changes. He is the personal trainer of several high-profile people from various fields, like business magnate George Soros, economist and former Federal Reserve Chairman Paul Volcker, former General Electric CEO Jack Welch (who recovered from muscular atrophy under Sitaras' supervision), journalist Charlie Rose, record executive David Geffen and NASCAR champion Jimmie Johnson (who was the first racing driver to become the Associated Press Male Athlete of the Year and who won seven championships).

== Early life ==
John Sitaras was born in Chios, Greece, in 1972. His family moved to the United States when he was 3 months old and he grew up in Brooklyn, in a rough neighborhood. Self-conscious about his 5-foot-11, 145-pound frame, Sitaras started bodybuilding at the age of 17, competing in bodybuilding within a year, and finishing fourth in his first regional competition in 1992. He also enrolled in Brooklyn College, where he took pre-medical courses, including psychology and nutrition. In 1993, due to financial reasons, he dropped out of school to focus on bodybuilding.

In 1995, while he and his best friend, Boris Levitsky, were eating lunch outside a Brooklyn restaurant, the two were attacked by a local gang, leaving Levitsky dead and Sitaras in a wheelchair for five months. The attack ended Sitaras' bodybuilding career and also caused a deep depression, worrying his friends and family. After he recovered, Sitaras worked for a period of time as a valet parking attendant, a truck driver and as an extra actor. Then he resumed his interest in the field of fitness, working in local fitness clubs, where he built his clientele and reputation. John Sitaras studied with a pain specialist at Lenox Hill Hospital to develop a no-injury strength-training methodology.

== Sitaras Fitness ==
In his early career as a fitness professional, John Sitaras created his own system and, as he developed a good following, he embarked on a plan to open his own gym. His plan was financed by some well-known Wall Street clients, who put in nearly $1.5 million, and the club, Sitaras Fitness, opened in November 2007, in Upper East Side, Manhattan. It quickly became a place frequented by high-profile people from various fields, like business magnate George Soros, economist and former Federal Reserve Chairman Paul Volcker, former General Electric CEO Jack Welch, journalist Charlie Rose, record executive David Geffen or NASCAR champion Jimmie Johnson. It is the only New York luxury gym featured among "The Most Beautiful Gyms in the World" list of Men's Journal.

Besides the fitness program, the gym became also a place for informal socializing between these members. At the same time there appeared the necessity to adjust the schedules in order to ensure that people who don’t get along in the corporate world are working out at different times. Sitaras has mentioned in an interview that he is careful to sort out "people coming here for the wrong reasons", such as the proximity to high profile artists. He also added that not all of his clients are famous, the main admission requirement is to have a high motivation and to take the program seriously.

A shareholder dispute appeared in December 2008, when, in the context of the economic downturn, three of the nine board members wanted to make important changes at the club in order to increase membership and their returns. They tried to unseat Sitaras as C.E.O., reduce his 53 percent ownership stake and transform the gym into a more mainstream club. Other shareholders sided with him and the three dissidents were bought out. The gym membership remained capped at 200 (as of March 2012, there were 144 members).

=== Sitaras Method ===
The Sitaras Method consists in an initial comprehensive evaluation system (which can take between 6-12 sessions) for assessing flexibility, cardio-respiratory fitness, strength, endurance, and body fat. Sitaras takes into account the unique musculature of the person, isolating differences between right and left sides of the body, different parts of each muscle, and the two major muscle fiber types (those for strength, and those for endurance), in order to design a workout tailored to each student's genetic aptitude, level of fitness, health conditions, and goals. An important goal is to develop muscular balance, which is the foundation for more specific goals such as aesthetics, strength and flexibility gains, or developing a more powerful athletic ability. The students must commit to working out at least twice a week, and are subject to a background check. They resume the muscle evaluation every three months with a variety of tools including digital scales, body fat and flexibility readers, and proprietary fitness software that helps track the clients strength gains over time. Based on the muscle evaluation, the fitness programs are adjusted or redesigned. The trainees too can follow the detailed physical changes of their body, giving them motivation and stimulation.

The method is also employed in physical recovery. Among people known of benefiting from it, Jack Welch mentioned that he managed to recover his strength after a staphylococcal infection which put him in a coma for 108 days and left part of his arms and legs atrophied.

The concept of this method is based on Sitaras' initial experience as a fitness trainer, especially concerning the lack of a scientific approach in this field, the usual trainer has available only an empirical knowledge of a client's body status. He found necessary an initial evaluation, similar to a hospital general medical examination giving detailed examination and subsequently providing proper treatment. He further envisaged an evaluation tailored on fitness goals that could give detailed insights and help the trainer analyze the physical status of their clients for a sufficient time. This would permit to investigate what is needed by understanding better the particular case of each individual. The location and the severity of the damages or inflammations on muscles and tendons also differ between people, meaning that the required exercises should be differed.

Sitaras developed the system for five years by recording measurements and histories before and after exercises, and studying how to investigate the principles and fundamentals of fitness training effects. When he started to put this method into practice, he described his approach as inspired from architecture, first a foundation should be established and then plan the structure upon the clients’ specific purposes (weight loss, flexibility, strength and power, cardiovascular health etc.). The method, intensity and frequency of a tailored fitness program is established based on the analysis of basic factors like age, medical histories and skills with consideration of requirements and purposes.

=== Jimmie Johnson ===
One of the persons most associated with Sitaras Method is NASCAR Sprint Cup Series race car driver Jimmie Johnson. The collaboration with John Sitaras began in December 2007, shortly after Johnson was named 2007 Driver of the Year. An initial assessment found that half of his body was much tighter, having acclimated to offsetting the g-force load from turning left his whole life. Sitaras created specific workouts to balance Johnson's strength, a run schedule and stressed the importance of an adequate diet. In two years, Johnson's body fat percentage dropped from 20% to 8% (visible also in the change of the shape of his face), while his strength and stamina greatly improved.

Jimmie Johnson was the first racing driver to become Associated Press Male Athlete of the Year (in 2009), and the only driver in NASCAR history to win five consecutive championships (overall six championships, 2006–2010, 2013). His story about his collaboration with Sitaras and the importance of fitness and nutrition to his career has been covered in various national media outlets. He also gave to the GAINSCO team the idea of using this method.

=== International partnerships ===
In 2012, John Sitaras signed a partnership with the South Korean luxury hotel The Shilla (part of Samsung Group), announcing that in late 2013 they will open in Seoul The Shilla-Sitaras Fitness Center, employing the Sitaras Method. The center opened on August 1, 2013. It is equipped with a digital measurement room, a first in Korea, and it gathers professional trainers, medalists, and national athletes to provide training for the members.

== Public sphere ==
John Sitaras appears regularly on American national TV posts, explaining the lifelong benefits of exercise, by sharing examples and advice.

In 2013, he became the head instructor of the Golf Digest magazine (Korean edition), from November starting a series of articles focused on musculature and body balance improvement for golf players.

In 2014, he was one of the 23 Greeks and Greek-Americans chosen to be featured in "Greeks Gone West", a series of short portrait films, to share their story on how they have pushed through the toughest parts of their journey to become successful in the United States. The series was supported by the Embassy of the United States in Athens and the Greek national newspaper Kathimerini.

== Foundation work ==
In 2008, Sitaras Fitness was a featured auction donor of the Princess Grace Awards Gala in New York City. John Sitaras was also a special guest speaker for Turn 2 Foundation, a charity organization founded by Derek Jeter, with a mission to help children and teenagers avoid drug and alcohol addiction, and to reward those who show high academic achievement and adopt healthier lifestyles. As a Brooklyn native, he instructed Brooklyn and Bronx children in the rigors of physical fitness and the rewards of pursuing their dream.

On July 7, 2012, at the "Unmasked" fundraising event in Bridgehampton, New York sponsored by Alexander Soros, a Sitaras Fitness gym package was auctioned in favor of the NGO Global Witness, an advocacy and activist organization that fights natural resource-related conflict and corruption and associated environmental and human rights abuses.

John Sitaras was one of the main fundraisers for The American Cancer Society at 2012 "Over The Edge" event, by rappelling down a skyscraper.
