= List of largest companies of South Korea =

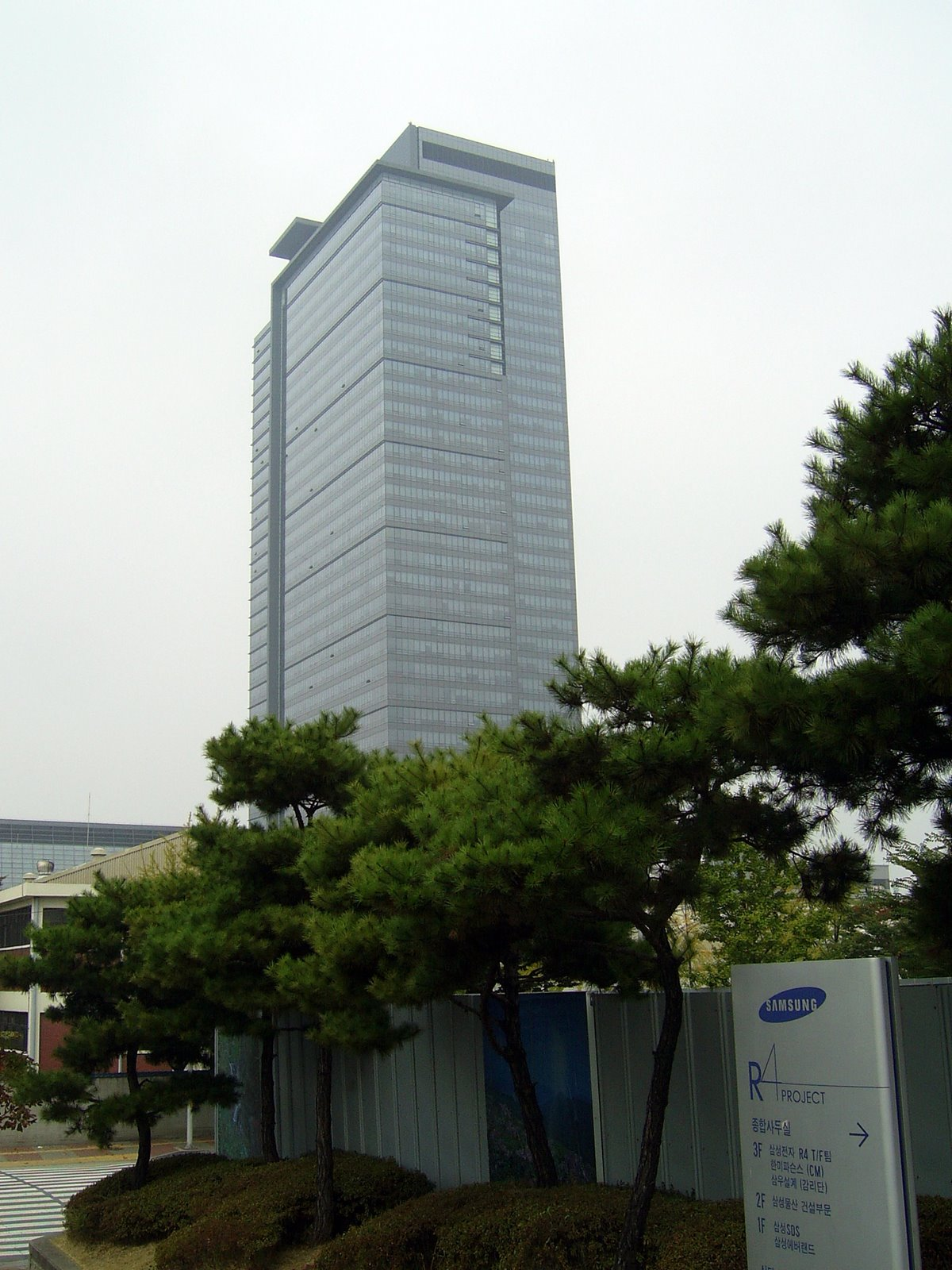
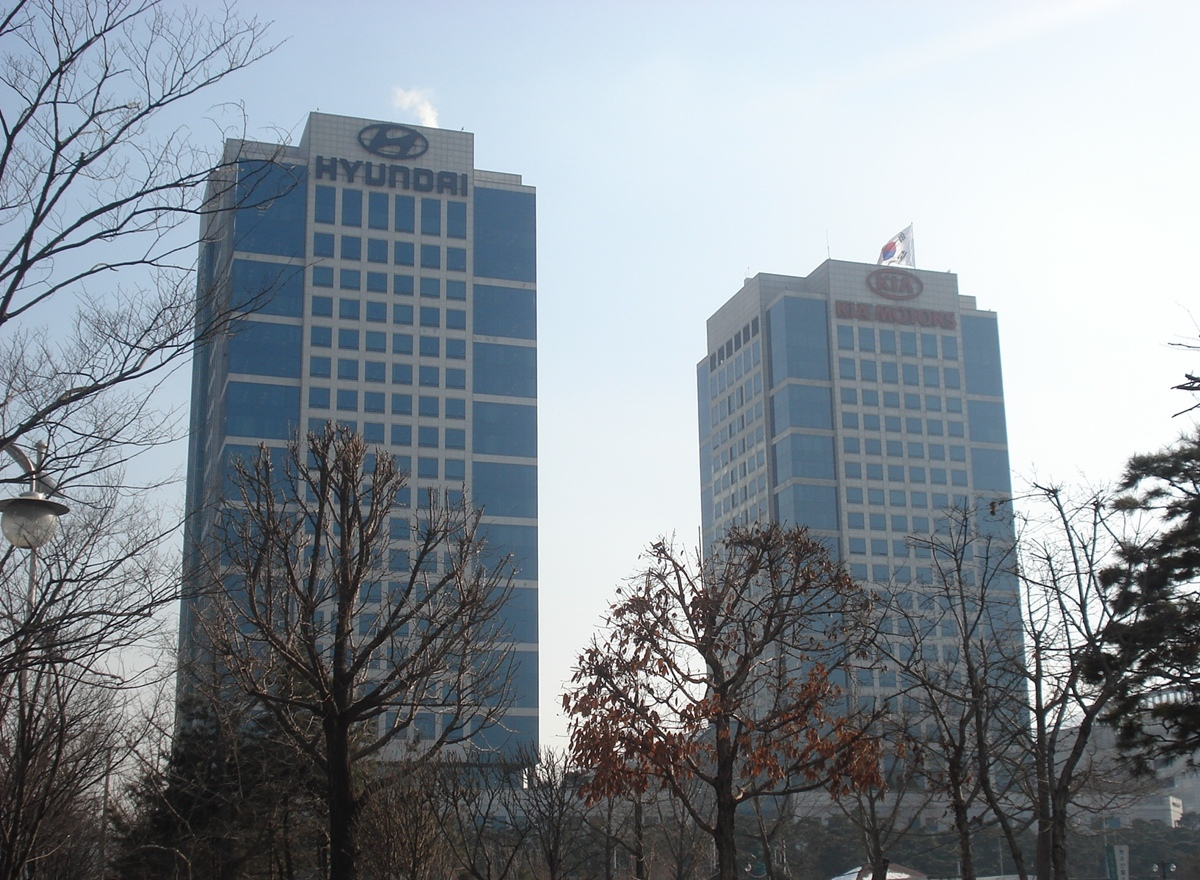
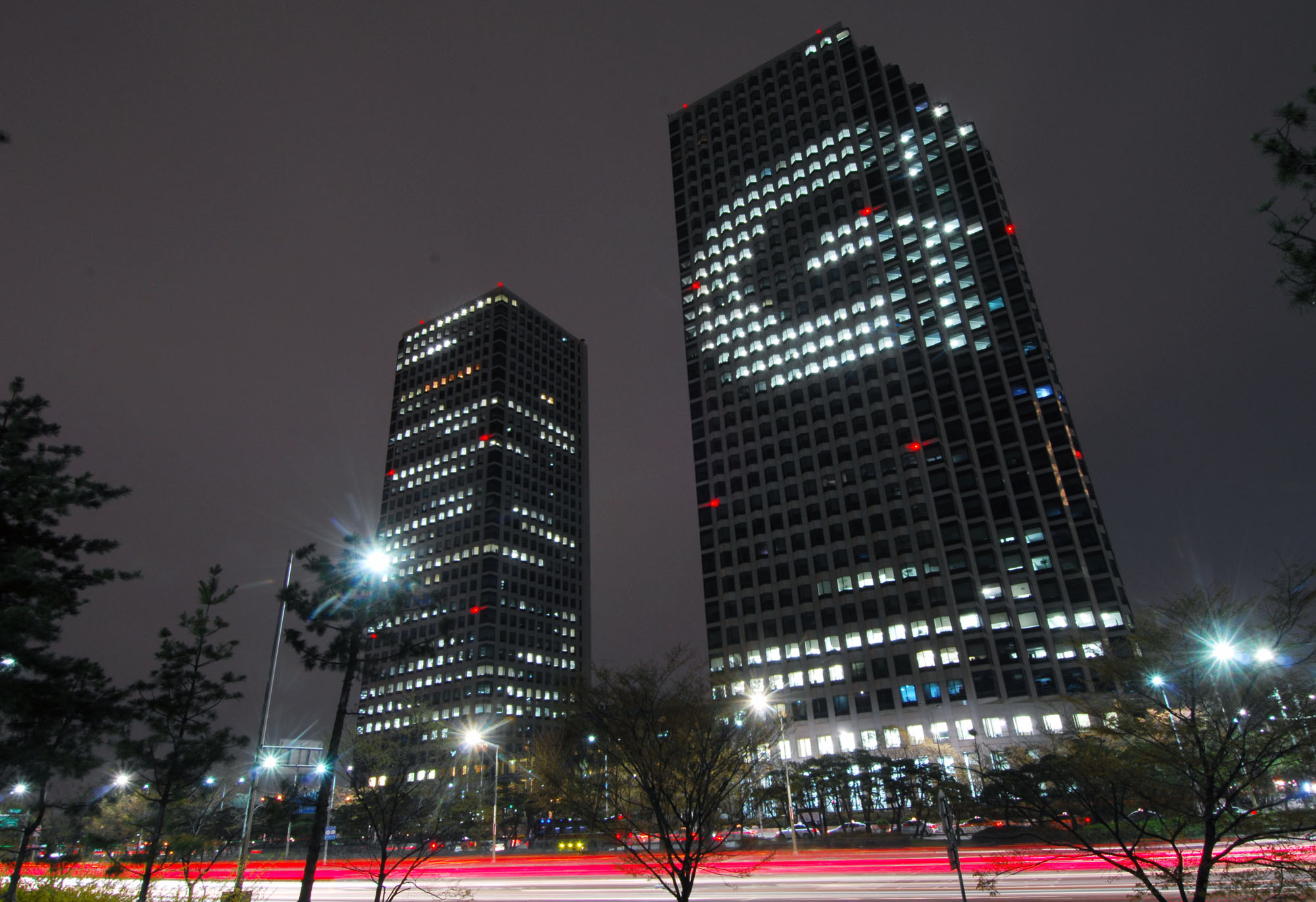
Corporate headquarter buildings of Big 4 Chaebol groups; Samsung, Hyundai Motors, SK, and LG (Clockwise from top left)

This article lists the largest companies in South Korea in terms of their revenue, net profit, total assets and market value according to American business magazines Fortune and Forbes.

== 2023 Fortune list ==
This list displays all 18 Korean companies in the Fortune Global 500, ranks the world's companies by revenue. The figures below are given in US dollars and are for the fiscal year 2022.

National rank	Global rank	Name	Industry	Headquarters	Revenue (US$ billions)
1	25	Samsung Electronics	Technology	Suwon, Gyeonggi	234.13
2	85	Hyundai Motor Company	Automotive	Seocho, Seoul	110.4
3	92	SK	Holdings	Jongno, Seoul	105.96
4	196	KIA	Automotive	Seocho, Seoul	67.06
5	201	POSCO	Steel	Pohang, Gyeongbuk	65.85
6	204	LG Electronics	Technology	Yeouido, Seoul	64.95
7	258	Korea Electric Power Corporation	Utilities	Naju, Jeonnam	54.65
8	296	Hanwha	Holdings	Jung, Seoul	48.25
9	301	HD Hyundai	Holdings	Seongnam, Gyeonggi	47.14
10	322	GS Caltex	Petroleum	Gangnam, Seoul	45.34
11	339	KB Financial	Finance	Yeouido, Seoul	43.62
12	371	LG Chem	Chemicals	Yeouido, Seoul	40.24
13	372	Hyundai Mobis	Automotive parts	Gangnam, Seoul	40.21
14	374	Korea Gas	Natural gas	Dong, Daegu	40.07
15	437	SK Hynix	Technology	Icheon, Gyeongggi	34.57
16	457	Samsung C&T	Construction; Sogo shosha	Gangdong; Jung District, Seoul	33.44
17	481	CJ Corporation	Holdings	Jung, Seoul	31.7
18	496	Samsung Life Insurance	Life insurance	Seocho, Seoul	31.24

== 2023 Forbes list ==
This list is based on the Forbes Global 2000, which ranks the world's 2,000 largest publicly traded companies. The Forbes list takes into account a multitude of factors, including the revenue, net profit, total assets and market value of each company; each factor is given a weighted rank in terms of importance when considering the overall ranking. The table below also lists the headquarters location and industry sector of each company. The figures are in billions of US dollars and are for the year 2019. The 52 highest ranked companies from South Korea are listed.

Rank		Name	Industry	Headquarters	Sales	Profit	Assets	Market value
National	Global	Name	Industry	Headquarters	(US$ billions)			
1	14	Samsung Electronics	Technology	Suwon, Gyeonggi	220.07	34.49	348.81	334.31
2	104	Hyundai Motor	Automotive	Seocho, Seoul	114.55	7.02	203.07	38.94
3	256	KIA	Automotive	Seocho, Seoul	70.17	4.96	58.29	26.04
4	278	KB Financial	Finance	Yeouido, Seoul	44.38	3.31	557.09	14.15
5	279	SK Hynix	Technology	Icheon, Gyeonggi	34.53	1.73	82.14	46.11
6	299	POSCO	Steel	Pohang, Gyeongbuk	63.21	2.43	78.82	21.73
7	300	Shinhan Financial Group	Finance	Jung, Seoul	33.38	3.46	534.51	13.85
8	339	LG Chem	Chemicals	Yeouido, Seoul	41.81	1.39	53.76	43.26
9	420	Hana Financial	Finance	Jung, Seoul	29.41	2.8	449.88	9.17
10	464	Hyundai Mobis	Automotive parts	Gangnam, Seoul	40.17	1.92	43.82	15.14
11	513	Samsung C&T	Construction; Sogo shosha	Gangdong; Jung District, Seoul	32.8	1.71	46.64	13.6
12	562	Woori Financial	Finance	Jung, Seoul	20.47	2.42	379.97	6.41
13	566	Samsung Life Insurance	Life insurance	Seocho, Seoul	23.15	1.23	249.47	9.07
14	590	Samsung SDI	Battery	Yongin, Gyeonggi	16.36	1.57	23.93	34.58
15	620	SK	Holdings	Jongno, Seoul	104.64	0.85	153.82	6.73
16	628	Industrial Bank of Korea	Banking	Yeouido, Seoul	15.9	2.17	341.62	6.04
17	631	Hanhwa	Holdings	Jung, Seoul	48.2	1.02	167	1.52
18	703	SK Innovation	Petroleum	Jongno, Seoul	61.8	0.55	55.25	11.57
19	718	Korea Gas	Natural gas	Dong, Daegu	40.02	1.16	49.37	1.75
20	730	HD Hyundai	Holdings	Seongnam, Gyeonggi	50.2	0.96	51.85	3.09
21	741	LG Electronics	Technology	Yeouido, Seoul	63.31	0.33	44.16	14.87
22	747	Korea Electric Power	Energy	Naju, Jeonnam	55.15	−18.94	185.69	9.22
23	790	Samsung Fire & Marine Insurance	Property insurance	Seocho, Seoul	16.46	0.99	68.41	7.29
24	825	HMM	Maritime transport	Yeouido, Seoul	14.38	7.78	20.54	7.41
25	842	GS Holdings	Holdings	Gangnam, Seoul	22.27	1.66	26.83	2.82
26	921	KT	Telecommunications	Seongnam, Gyeonggi	19.85	0.97	32.41	5.89
27	961	Meritz Financial	Finance	Gangnam, Seoul	10.7	0.8	72.87	7.11
28	1,004	DB Insurance	Property insurance	Gangnam, Seoul	13.68	0.76	50.04	3.64
29	1,037	E-mart	Retail	Jung, Seoul	22.7	0.78	26.26	1.98
30	1,057	S-Oil	Petroleum	Mapo, Seoul	32.25	1.14	15.57	6.37
31	1,140	Korean Air	Airline	Gangseo, Seoul	10.91	1.33	22.93	6.38
32	1,144	CJ Corporation	Holdings	Jung, Seoul	31.67	0.15	38.15	2.29
33	1,157	Hyundai Steel	Steel	Dong, Incheon	20.43	0.57	29.1	3.54
34	1,161	Naver	Technology	Seongnam, Gyeonggi	6.36	0.58	26.81	22.23
35	1,186	SK Telecom	Telecommunications	Jung, Seoul	13.39	0.69	24.76	7.93
36	1,281	Hyundai Glovis	Logistics	Seongdong, Seoul	20.61	0.9	11.23	4.72
37	1,303	CJ CheilJedang	Food	Jung, Seoul	23.28	0.46	23.73	3.75
38	1,318	LG	Holdings	Yeouido, Seoul	4.55	0.97	23.43	10.65
39	1,336	Korea Investment	Finance	Yeouido, Seoul	8.58	0.48	68.25	2.36
40	1,361	LG Display	Technology	Yeouido, Seoul	18.35	−3.24	28.22	3.96
34	1,371	Hyundai Marine & Fire Insurance	Property insurance	Jongno, Seoul	12.21	0.43	40.12	2.2
35	1,387	BNK Financial	Finance	Nam, Busan	5.5	0.59	108.64	1.63
36	1,456	Samsung SDS	Technology	Songpa, Seoul	12.56	0.84	9.24	6.93
37	1,459	LG Innotek	Technology	Gangseo, Seoul	15.16	0.75	7.94	4.64
38	1,522	Lotte Chemical	Chemicals	Songpa, Seoul	17.24	0.04	21.18	5.48
39	1,541	HD Korea Shipbuilding & Offshore Engineering	Shipbuilding	Seongnam, Gyeonggi	14.46	−0.05	23.63	4.42
40	1,554	Mirae Asset Financial	Finance	Jung, Seoul	3.14	0.49	84	3.06
41	1,621	Lotte Shopping	Retail	Jung, Seoul	11.98	−0.25	25.07	1.7
42	1,629	Doosan	Holdings	Jung, Seoul	13.74	−0.35	20.81	1.19
43	1,675	Daou Data	Technology	Mapo, Seoul	7.54	0.15	39.44	0.46
44	1,696	Hyundai Engineering & Construction	Construction	Jongno, Seoul	17.66	0.31	16.54	3.44
45	1,700	Kakao	Technology	Jeju, Jeju	5.49	0.1	18.16	18.89
46	1,730	DGB Financial	Finance	Buk, Daegu	4.23	0.3	72	0.88
47	1,732	Daou Technology	Technology	Seongnam, Gyeonggi	7.13	0.28	38.96	0.6
48	1,836	Samsung Electro-Mechanics	Technology	Suwon, Gyeongggi	7.29	0.75	8.7	7.87
49	1,860	JB Financial	Finance	Jeonju, Jeonbuk	2.52	0.44	47.31	1.22
50	1,909	LG Uplus	Telecommunications	Yongsan, Seoul	10.76	0.51	15.64	3.61
51	1,943	Korea Zinc	Non-steel smelting	Gangnam, Seoul	8.68	0.6	9.57	7.63
52	1,953	Kakao Bank	Banking	Seongnam, Gyeonggi	1.4	0.22	31.25	8.49

== See also ==
- List of companies of South Korea
- List of largest companies by revenue
