= Professional fitness coach =

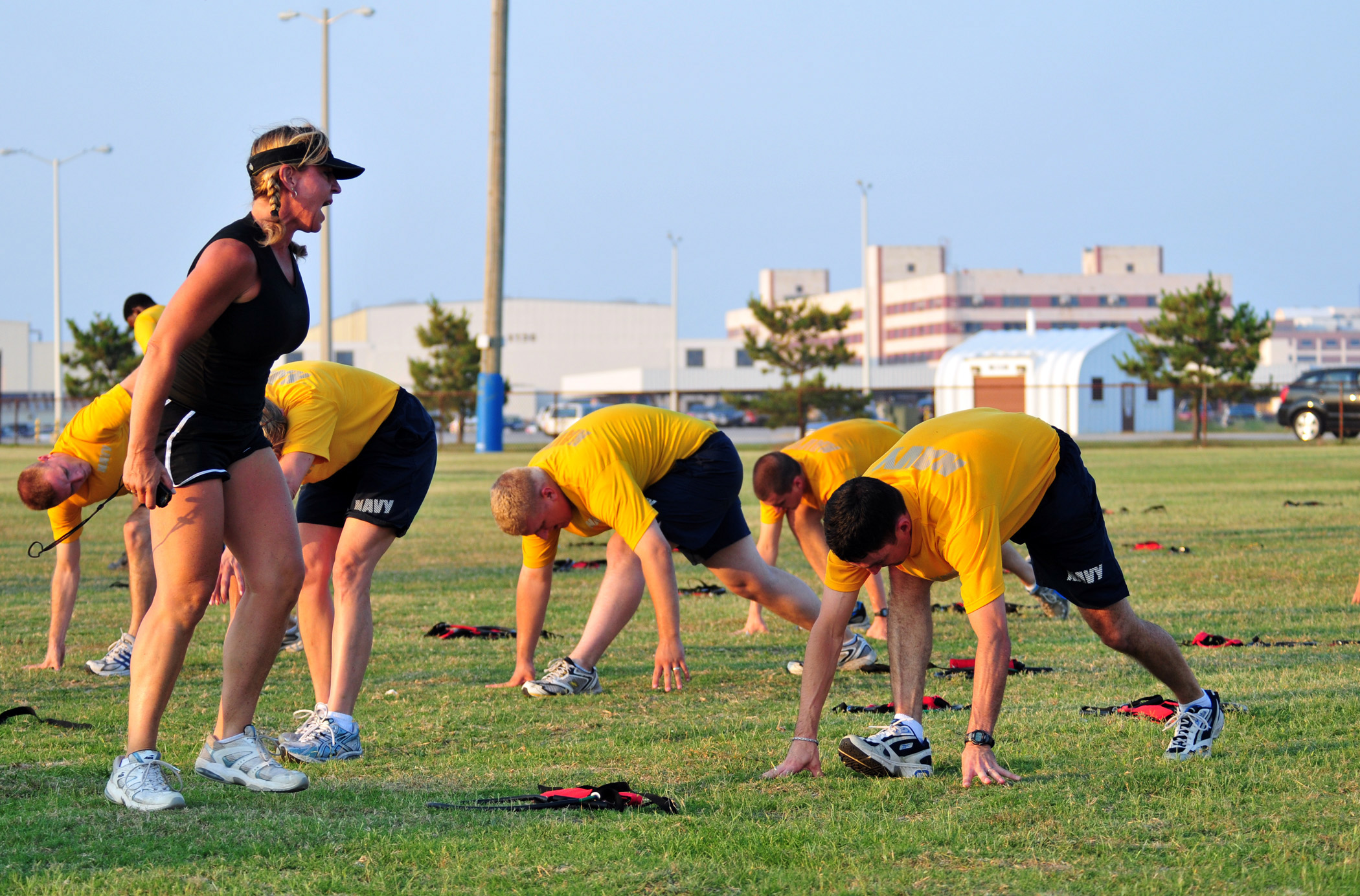
U.S. Navy sailors exercising in the presence of a female fitness instructor, 2010

A professional fitness coach is a professional in the field of fitness and exercise, most often instruction (fitness instructor), including professional sports club's fitness trainers and aerobics and yoga instructors and authors of fitness instruction books or manuals.

== Overview ==
Fitness topics may also include nutrition, weight-loss, and self-help. Fitness careers are distinguished from exercise science careers such as athletic training, however the various types of fitness certifications have more and more in common: the, "distinctions...have become blurred, with more similarities than differences given the common background that all fitness professionals must possess."

Fitness professionals screen participants for exercise programs, evaluate various fitness components, prescribe exercise to improve these components, and may also help clients with specific or chronic conditions. Fitness professionals help challenge an individual by increasing their performance, as compared to when a person would work out on their own. They also teach new workouts, how to improve their form, performance and help set and achieve goals. The key roles and duties of a fitness professional are to: motivate, assist clients and measure heart rates and body fat levels. Trainers need to be patient, well organized and have time management as well as interpersonal skills."You are in a helping profession. Although you are not a social worker, psychologist or guidance counselor, neither are you simply a technician with advanced training in exercise science, biomechanics, program design and assessment methodology."(Jim and Nettie Gavin) Notable fitness professionals or former fitness professionals include Richard Simmons, Susan Powter, John Sitaras and Gov. Arnold Schwarzenegger (Arnold Schwarzenegger's Total Body Workout).

Certified fitness professionals must remain up-to-date on all certifications in order to instruct at particular health clubs and gyms. Often, fitness professionals will have some education in kinesiology, anatomy, and biomechanics to aid in their fitness career.

In Canada, Canadian Fitness Education Services (CFES) provides national fitness leadership program modules to take candidates through the steps in Aquafit, Group Fitness and/or Weight Training Instructor and Personal Trainer national certification.

== Coaches ==
A coach can help amateur and professional athletes to be successful in a particular sport by teaching them the required skills needed. However, they can coach more than one sport to multiple people. Their role involves identifying athletes strengths and weaknesses as well as those of their opponent. Coaches also improve the physical condition of an athlete to help increase their full performance; improve form, technique, skills and stamina. A coach must be ready to work long and irregular hours including evenings, weekends and holidays. Typically, coaches are required to be a minimum 18 years of age and have a bachelor's degree.

== National teams and Professional clubs ==
Most national sports teams and professional sportsclubs have professional fitness coaches in order to systematically improve fitness and conditioning.

== Salary and benefits ==
The median annual pay for a personal trainer in the US as of 2019 is $40,390. The highest paid college coach in 2017 was Nick Saban (University of Alabama) who earned $11.1 million. Fitness professionals receive benefits that can include healthcare, paid time off, and a pension. There is also the opportunity to accelerate personal achievements and the option to work full-time or part-time. According to the Bureau of Labor Statistics, "employment of fitness trainers and instructors is projected to grow 13 percent from 2018 to 2028, much faster than the average for all occupations.”

== Qualifications and experience required ==
Fitness professionals need to have at least a high school diploma and in some fields, a bachelor's degree in a related field is required. Additionally, they must be certified in CPR (cardiovascular resuscitation) which is offered by the American Red Cross among many other classes such as First Aid and AED (Automated External Defibrillator). Certification. They also offer lifeguard training, swimming, and water safety.

Other qualifications depending on the specific field can include:

- Board of Certification, Inc (BOC), provides a program for the entry level fitness professional
- Commission on Accreditation of Athletic Training Education (CAATE), improves athletic training
- The American Society of Exercise Physiologists, (ASEP) assists exercise physiologists
- The America College of Sports Medicine (ACSM),

== See also ==
- Exercise trends
- Fitness culture
- Physical fitness
- Personal trainer
- Nutritionist
