= Hong Jin-ki =

South Korean jurist (1917–1986)

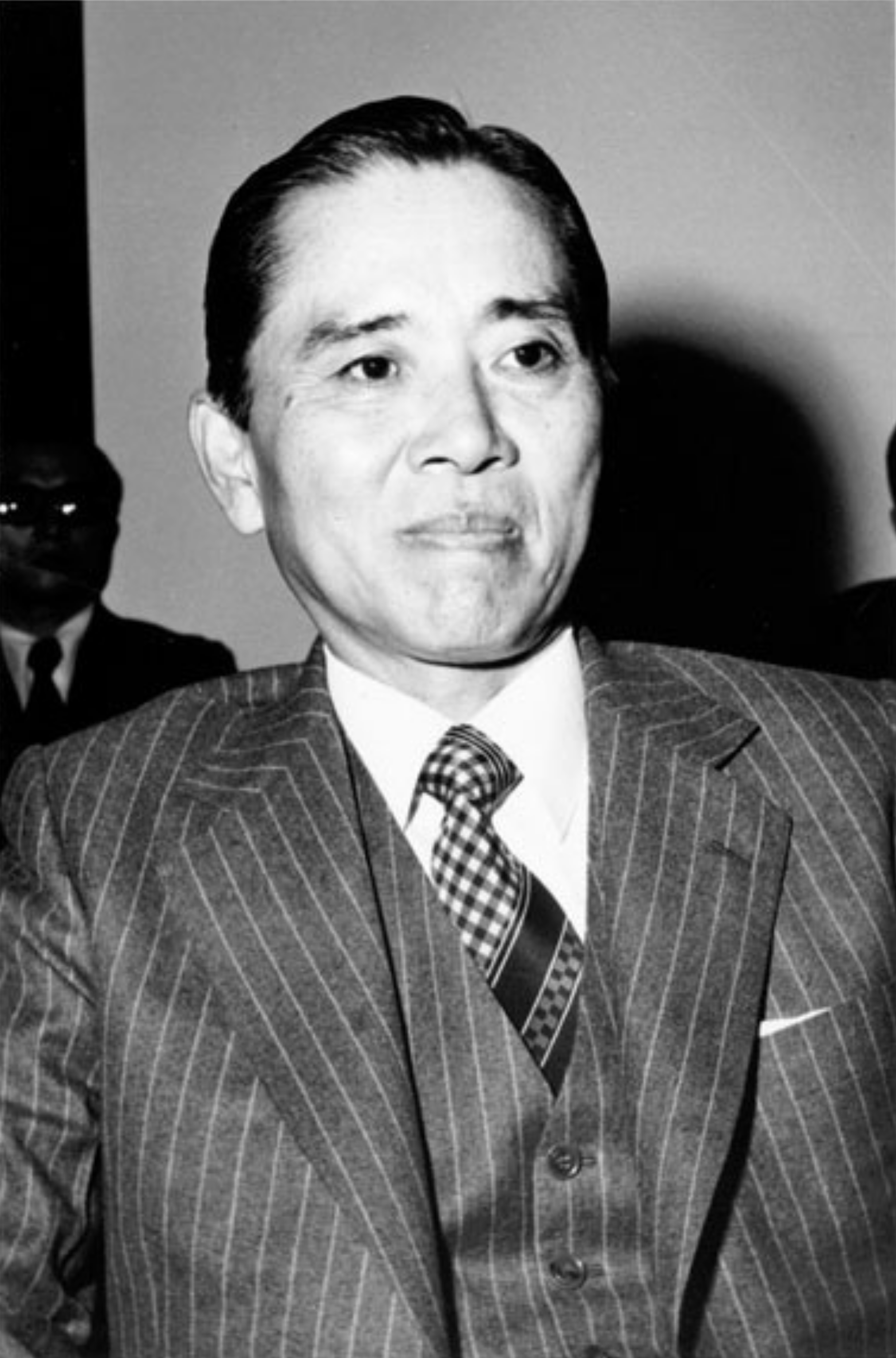
Minister of Home Affairs Hong Jin-ki in 1960

Hong Jin-Ki (Korean: 홍진기; Hanja: 洪璡基; Japanese: 德山 進一, romanized: Tokuyama Shin'ichi; 13 March 1917 – 13 July 1986) was a South Korean media mogul, jurist and politician of Syngman Rhee's government who served as the 9th Minister of Justice from 1958 to 1960.

== Biography ==
Hong Jin-Ki was born in Seoul. He attended the Keijō Imperial University, where he received a Bachelor of Laws (LL.B) in 1940. And soon afterwards Hong Jin-ki passed the judicial examination under the colonial administration of imperial Japan. Immediately on completing his probationary judicial officer, he was appointed to a judge of the Jeonju District Court in 1943.

=== After liberation ===
After Korea was liberated from Japan on 15 August 1945, the Special Committee for Prosecution of Anti-National Offenders (banmin teukwi, 반민특위) had been established to purge and prosecute the pro-Japanese who worked for the Japanese colonial government. However, all efforts were hampered and dissolved by Dr. Syngman Rhee, the first president of South Korea, who had to depend on the pro-Japanese to establish his regime. As a result of Dr. Rhee's political schemes, many pro-Japanese as well as Hong Jin-Ki could cut their ways of what they have done during the Japanese rule, resulting in the empowerment and reinstatement of the pro-Japanese officials, armies and police.

=== First Republic of South Korea and April Revolution ===
After joining Syngman Rhee Government, Hong Jin-ki served as the Justice Deputy Minister in 1954, and then the Minister of Justice in 1958, and became the Home Office Minister in 1960. A growing civil uprising against the rigged election in March 1960 ended up developing into the April Revolution, and Syngman Rhee went out of his office on 26 April 1960; Rhee was pressured by the United States Government into an immediate resignation. On 15 June 1960, the Second Republic, led by Yoon Bo-seon (the 4th President of South President) and Chang Myon (the 2nd Prime Minister of South Korea), was established by the new constitution. Upon the inauguration of the new government, it was shown that there were many problems with economic climate. Eventually, the powerless and incompetent Second Republic was ended by a military government under the Supreme Council for National Reconstruction. At the instigation of the military junta, the Revolution Tribunals were established for punishing political offenders, political henchmen, illicit fortune amassers and high-ranking officials relating to armed crackdown during April Revolution.

=== Revolution trial ===
Along with the Presidential Security Chief Gwak Young-joo (곽영주), the Commissioner of Seoul Metropolitan Agency Ryu Choong-ryul (류충렬), and Chief of Seoul Security Division Baek Nam-kyu (백남규), Hong Jin-Ki was indicted on charges that he ordered security forces and police to shoot unarmed protesters during the uprising on 19 April 1960. Moreover, the military government indicted Hong Jin-Ki on another charge of commanding his subordinates to rig the 4th presidential election. He was sentenced to death, but his sentence was commuted to life in prison. In the years after the Revolution Tribunal, he was released from prison on a special amnesty, because it had proved Hong Jin-Ki did not order to shoot.

=== Becoming a media mogul ===
In 1968, he was appointed to chief executive officer of Joongang Broadcasting Station. He was named Joongang Ilbo's president in 1968 and became chairman in 1980. He played a crucial role in developing Joongang Ilbo as one of the country's three main newspapers from the 1980s until his death in 1984. His eldest son, Hong Suk-yeon, is the current head of the Joongang Ilbo. On 29 August 2005, the Institute for Research in Collaborationist Activities issued a list of 3,094 pro-Japanese collaborators including Park Jung-Hee, the former Korean President, Bang Eun-Mo, a former president of The Chosun Ilbo, Kim Song Su, a former publisher of The Dong-A Ilbo, and Hong Jin-Ki.

=== Hong Jin-Ki Creator Award ===
The Hong Jin-Ki Creator Award was made in honor of Hong Jin-ki and is funded and given by the Joongang Hwadong Foundation.

== Family ==
Hong's family got into matrimonial relations with prominent personages in politics and businesses, such as Lee Byung-chul, the founder of Samsung Group and Noh Shin-yeong, the 16th Prime Minister.

- Wife: Kim Yoon-nam (金允楠, 1924–2012)
- First son: Hong Seok-hyun (洪錫炫, 1942–) – the Chairman of Joongang Ilbo, the 20th Ambassador to the United States
- First daughter: Hong Ra-hee (洪羅喜, 1944–) – the current director-general of Leeum Samsung Museum
- Son-in-law: Lee Kun-hee (李健熙, 1942–2020) – the previous chairman of Samsung Group
- Second son: Hong Seok-jo (洪錫肇, 1949–) – BGF Retail's chairman, the 35th Director of the Gwangju High Public Prosecutor's office
- Third son: Hong Seok-joon (洪錫埈, 1954–) – the vice president of Samsung SDI
- Fourth and youngest son: Hong Seok-kyu (洪錫珪, 1957–) – the current chairman of Bokang
- Second daughter: Hong Ra-young (洪羅玲, 1959–) – the executive director of Samsung Foundation
- Son-in-law: Noh Cheol-soo (盧哲秀, 1954–) – the current chairman of Amicus Group, son of former Prime Minister Lho Shin-yong

== See also ==
- First Republic of South Korea
- March 1960 South Korean presidential election
- April Revolution
- May 16 coup
- Chinilpa
