= Hong Ra-hee =

South Korean female billionaire (born 1945)

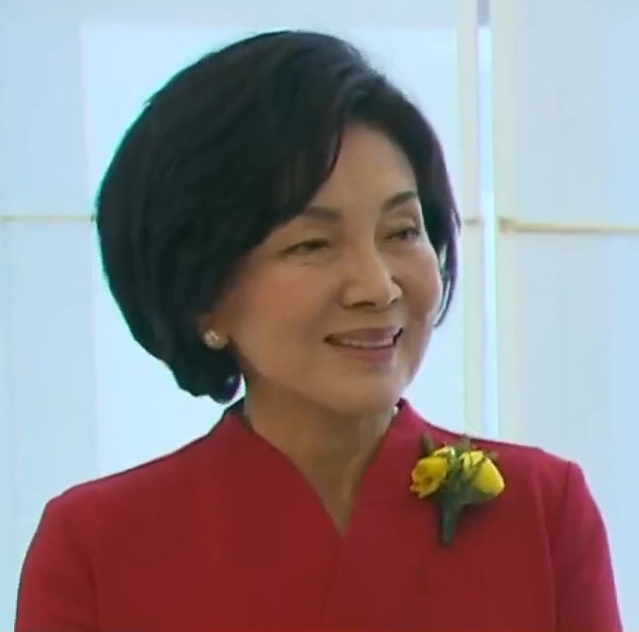
- Born: 15 July 1945 (age 81); Jeonju, South Korea
- Education: Seoul National University
- Occupation: Businesswoman
- Spouse: Lee Kun-hee
- Children: Lee Jae-yong; Lee Boo-jin; Lee Seo-hyun; Lee Yoon-hyung
- Parent(s): Hong Jin-ki (1917–1986) (father); Kim Yoon-nam (1924–2013) (mother)

Korean name
- Hangul: 홍라희
- Hanja: 洪羅喜
- RR: Hong Rahui
- MR: Hong Rahŭi

Hong Ra-hee (Korean: 홍라희; born 15 July 1945) is a South Korean billionaire businesswoman who is the director of Leeum Museum of Art. She is the widow of Lee Kun-hee, who was the richest person in South Korea. She is known as the most powerful art collector in South Korea. She is among the richest people in South Korea. In June 2026, Forbes estimated her net worth at US$13.6 billion and ranked her 4th richest in the country, just behind her son and her two surviving daughters.

== Career ==
Hong graduated from Seoul National University. She majored in Applied Arts. She is the co-founder of Leeum Museum of Art, which she founded with her husband in 2004. Hong's collection includes Lee Ufan, Do Ho Suh, Whanki Kim, Jackson Pollock, Mark Rothko, and Andy Warhol.

Hong began her career at JoongAng Ilbo Publishing from 1975 to 1980.

She served as a Chairperson of Samsung Arts and Cultural Foundation since 1995.

== Family ==
Her daughters are joint presidents of Samsung C&T Corporation. Her daughter Lee Seo-hyun oversees Samsung's fashion division, while her other daughter Lee Boo-jin oversees the resort division, which includes the Everland Resort. Her father Hong Jin-ki was chairman of JoongAng Ilbo, and also an identified Chinilpa. Her brother Hong Seok-hyun is the ex-CEO of JoongAng Media Group. It is now run by Hong Jeongdo, Hong's nephew.

Her ex-daughter-in-law was Lim Se-ryung, the daughter of Daesang Group's chairman Lim Chang-Wook. Lim was married to Hong's son Lee Jae-yong in 1998 and divorced in 2009.
