= Hong Seok-hyun =

South Korean media mogul and diplomat (born 1949)

South Korean Ambassador to the United States
- In office 22 February 2005 – 23 September 2005
- President: Roh Moo-hyun
- Preceded by: Han Sung-joo
- Succeeded by: Lee Tae-sik

Personal details
- Born: 20 October 1949 (age 76) Seoul, South Korea
- Spouse: Yun Gyun S. Hong
- Children: Hong Jeong-do
- Parent(s): Hong Jin-ki; Kim Youn-nam
- Relatives: See Namyang Hong clan
- Education: Seoul National University (BS); Stanford University (MS); Stanford University (PhD)
- Occupation: Media mogul, diplomat
- Website: LinkedIn

Korean name
- Hangul: 홍석현
- Hanja: 洪錫炫
- RR: Hong Seokhyeon
- MR: Hong Sŏkhyŏn

Hong Seok-hyun (born 20 October 1949) is a South Korean media mogul and diplomat who is the chairman of JoongAng Holdings, the Korea Peace Foundation, and the Korea Baduk Association. He is a brother-in-law of Lee Kun-hee.

In 1994 he became the president and publisher of JoongAng Ilbo. Since then, he has led major innovations in South Korean newspaper industry, and completed comprehensive and all-round media portfolio with different media organizations.

As being recognized by a wide range of global network and partnership of the company, he served as the president of the World Association of Newspapers from 2002 to early 2005, and was the first person from Asia to hold the post. He was also a president of the ROK's Korea Association of Newspapers from 2003 to 2005.

He has been active in public service as well. From late 70s to early 80s, he worked in the World Bank and South Korean government service. Also, he served as the ambassador to the United States from February 2005 until his resignation in September 2005.

Hong graduated from Kyunggi High School in 1968. He received a bachelor's degree in engineering from Seoul National University (South Korea) in 1972, and a master's in industrial engineering from Stanford University (U.S.) in 1978. He went on to acquire a Ph.D. in economics from Stanford University (U.S.) in 1980.

== CEO of a global media group ==
Since he became the president and publisher of JoongAng Ilbo in 1994, he has achieved major innovations and development of South Korean newspapers. He has presented new standards such as the induction of specialized journalists (1994), the publication of sectional newspapers (1994), the start of an online news service for the first time in Asia (1995) and the publication of a high-end Sunday newspaper (2007) etc. These were all firsts in South Korean press history and soon became new standards for the local industry. In 2009, JoongAng Ilbo changed its format from Broadsheet to Berliner, which was the first move among South Korean newspapers.

In 2000s, JoongAng Ilbo has expanded into a media group, which is called JMnet(JoongAng Media Network), operating newspapers (JoongAng Ilbo, JoongAng Sunday, IS Ilgan Sports, Korea JoongAng daily, The Korea Daily), broadcasting channels (JTBC, JTBC2, JTBC3 Fox Sports, JTBC Golf), publishing, magazine and entertainment sectors (MegaBox). JMnet became the only media group that runs such a diverse portfolio in Korea, with over 2,500 employees.

JMnet acquired Multiplex MegaBox in 2015 and acquired Bokwang Corporation in the following year. Bokwang Corporation was changed to Phoenix Hotel and Resorts since it had been acquired.

JMnet declared JoongAng Group for new beginnings in 2018.

== Public services ==
During his career, he has been active in public service. He worked as an economist for the World Bank from 1977 to 1983. From 1983 to 1985, he served as principal assistant to the chief of staff to the president of Korea. He also worked as a researcher in Korea Development Institute from 1985 to 1986.

He was appointed to the ambassador to the United States from February 2005 until he resigned in September 2005 due to his involvement in the X-file scandal.

== Global activities ==
As being recognized by a wide range of global network and partnership, he served as president of the World Association of Newspapers, a position to which he was elected in 2002 and re-elected in June 2004.

He also served as the first chairman of the newly launched the English-Speaking Union Korea in 2004. He is a member of the Trilateral Commission; the International Advisory Council for the Center on Northeast Asian Policy Studies at the Brookings Institution; the Advisory Council for the Asian Studies Center of the Heritage Foundation; and the Advisory Council of the Korea Society. He also serves on the board of the Asia Society.

== Cultural contribution ==
Hong has contributed to strengthen ties between scholars and journalists as annually hosting J-Global Forum and Northeast Asia Trilateral Forum. He is the president of the organizing committee of the World Culture Open (WCO), a global cultural network of people creatively collaborating for cultural exchange, space and support worldwide.

As an effort to restore traditional culture in South Korea, he founded Hwa Dong Cultural Foundation and has been staging related events and activities around the world. In 2011, Hwa Dong Cultural Foundation and The Prince's Charities Foundation in UK completed the project of filming "The Arch of Enlightenment," a documentary of restoration of Gwanghwamun Gate. The film was premiered at London's Curzon Mayfair Cinema on 31 January 2011 with about 300 guests including Prince Charles, and later aired on Sky Art 2.

As the founder of Yumin Cultural Foundation, he also has supported various efforts to promote creative works in the fields of journalism, science, culture and society.

== Personal life ==
Hong Seok-hyun's father is Hong Jin-ki, a former minister of justice, chief executive officer of Joongang Broadcasting Station and president of JoongAng Ilbo.

Hong Seok-hyun is the brother-in-law of the late Lee Kun-hee, the former chairman of Samsung Group. Lee Kun-hee was married to Hong's sister Hong Ra-hee.
