= Lee Yoon-hyung =

South Korean millionaire (1979–2005)

- Born: 26 April 1979; Seoul, South Korea
- Died: 18 November 2005 (aged 26); New York City, U.S.
- Cause of death: Suicide by hanging
- Education: Ewha Womans University (BA); Steinhardt School of Culture, Education, and Human Development
- Parents: Lee Kun-hee (father); Hong Ra-hee (mother)
- Relatives: Lee Jae-yong (brother); Lee Boo-jin (sister)

Korean name
- Hangul: 이윤형
- Hanja: 李尹馨
- RR: I Yunhyeong
- MR: I Yunhyŏng

Lee Yoon-hyung (Korean: 이윤형; 26 April 1979 – 18 November 2005) was a South Korean millionaire who is the daughter of Samsung Group former chairman Lee Kun-hee. On 18 November 2005, Lee died by suicide at the age of 26 in her New York City apartment.

== Early life and education ==
Lee was born in South Korea. Her father was Samsung former chairman Lee Kun-hee, and her mother was Hong Ra-hee. She was the youngest of the four children; she had an elder brother Lee Jae-yong and two elder sisters Lee Boo-jin and Lee Seo-hyun.

Lee graduated from Ewha Womans University in Seoul with a Bachelor of Arts degree in French language and French literature. She was a first year graduate student in arts management at New York University's Steinhardt School of Culture, Education, and Human Development.

== Death ==
Her cause of death was originally reported in both American and South Korean media as a car crash due to the social stigma against suicide, but the actual details were subsequently published after inquiries by reporters from The Korea Times.

At the time of her death, Lee was a graduate student at the New York University Steinhardt School of Culture, Education, and Human Development, and her father was in the United States undergoing treatment for lung cancer. A doorman at her building told reporters that she sometimes stayed in her apartment for a week at a time, and there were reports that her father had forbidden her to marry her middle-class Korean boyfriend.

At the time of her death, Lee had a personal fortune of more than £100 million (US$157 million).

== Personal life ==
In 2003, it was revealed that she owned $191 million of Samsung stock.

In her spare time, she participated in car racing and extreme sports. She maintained a personal blog about her daily life, which was widely read in South Korea.
