= Hotel Shilla =

South Korean hotel company

Hotel Shilla Co., Ltd.
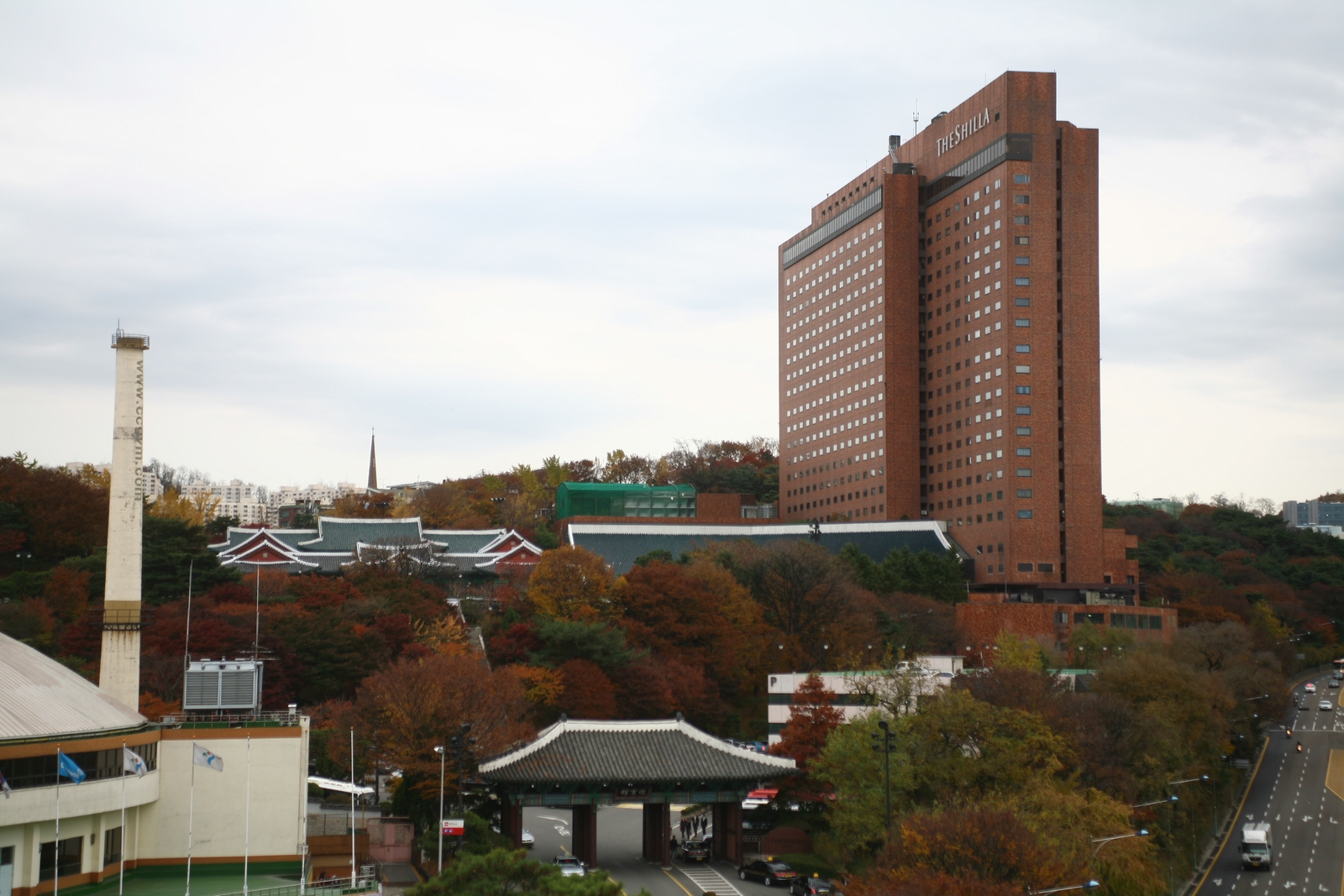
- The Shilla Seoul and the company's headquarters in Seoul
- Native name: 주식회사 신라호텔
- Company type: Public
- Traded as: KRX: 008770
- Industry: Hospitality
- Founded: March 1979
- Headquarters: Seoul, South Korea
- Number of locations: 15 hotels & resorts (July 2020)
- Area served: South Korea, Vietnam, China
- Key people: Lee Boo-jin (President & CEO)
- Products: Hotels
- Parent: Samsung
- Website: www.shillahotels.com

Hotel Shilla Co., Ltd. (Korean: 주식회사 신라호텔) is a South Korean operator of luxury hotels and duty-free shops. It is a member of The Leading Hotels of the World. The company is an affiliate of Samsung. The name Shilla(신라) refers to the ancient Korean kingdom of Shilla (also spelled "Silla"), chosen to evoke the dazzling culture and arts for which that kingdom was known.

== History ==
Hotel Shilla started operations in March 1979 at the direction of Lee Byung-chul, founder of the Samsung Group. Before 1979, it was the state guest house of South Korea under the Park Chung Hee government. Now, it has been expanding into the commissioned management of fitness facilities as well as into the restaurant business. The Shilla focuses on "the harmony and beauty of modernism and tradition". They have hotels located in Seoul, Jeju, and Suzhou, China.

In January 2008, the Shilla was selected as one of the top 500 hotels in the world by Travel & Leisure.

The Seoul branch reopened to the public on August 1, 2013, after seven months of renovations, featuring the first year-round outdoor pool in Seoul ("Urban Island") and the Shilla-Sitaras Fitness Center.

== Facilities ==
There are two Presidential Suites at the Shilla Hotel, in Jangchung-dong, Jung District: the 280.9 m^{2} (3,024 sq ft) south wing with a blend of traditional Korean decor and the 390 m^{2} (4,200 sq ft) north wing with a Parisian palace decor.

The fitness center, affiliated with Sitaras Fitness, is equipped with a digital measurement room, a first in Korea, and provides a differentiated fitness coaching service using a smart coaching system. A fitness program is customized for each client according to the results of a physical fitness assessment for systematic management.

Shilla Hotel's Yeong Bin Gwan (영빈관) is considered a place where many celebrities (entrepreneurs, entertainers, etc.) get married. The wedding hall is divided into two-story Dynasty Hall (650 seats), Ruby Hall (130 seats) and Topaz Hall (120 seats) on the first floor. The more seats there are, the higher the price.

== Properties ==
- The Shilla
  - The Shilla Seoul
  - The Shilla Jeju
- Shilla Monogram
  - Shilla Monogram Quangnam Danang
- Shilla Stay
  - Shilla Stay Gwanghwamun
  - Shilla Stay Mapo
  - Shilla Stay Seodaemun
  - Shilla Stay Yeoksam
  - Shilla Stay Seocho
  - Shilla Stay Guro
  - Shilla Stay Samsung
  - Shilla Stay Dongtan
  - Shilla Stay Cheonan
  - Shilla Stay Ulsan
  - Shilla Stay Haeundae
  - Shilla Stay Seobusan
  - Shilla Stay Jeju
