= Samsung SDS =

South Korean IT company and subsidiary of Samsung Group

Samsung SDS Co. Ltd.

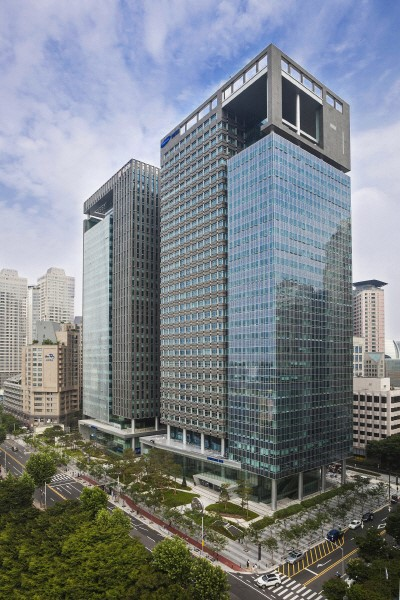
- Headquarters in Seoul
- Native name: 삼성에스디에스 주식회사
- Type: Public
- Traded as: KRX: 018260
- ISIN: KR7018260000
- Founded: May 1, 1985; 41 years ago
- Headquarters: 35 Olympic-Ro, 125, Songpa-gu,, Seoul, South Korea
- Key people: Junehee Lee (CEO)
- Revenue: KRW 11.01 trillion (2020)
- Operating income: KRW 872 billion (2020)
- Net income: KRW 453 billion (2020)
- Total assets: KRW 6.51 trillion (2020)
- Owners: Samsung Electronics (22.58%); Samsung C&T (17.08%); Estate of Jay Y. Lee (17.01%); National Pension Service (6.73%)
- Number of employees: 12,501 (2019)
- Parent: Samsung Group
- Website: www.samsungsds.com

Samsung SDS Co., Ltd. (formerly Samsung Data Systems; Korean: 삼성에스디에스 주식회사), Established in 1985 as a subsidiary of Samsung Group, is a provider of Information Technology (IT) services, including consulting, technical, and outsourcing services. SDS is also active in research and development of emerging IT technologies such as Artificial Intelligence (AI), Blockchain, Internet of Things (IoT) and outsourcing in engineering. In 2019, Samsung SDS reported a net profit of 750.4 billion won (US$635 million), an increase of 17.5% year-on-year. The company is estimated to have the 11th most valuable brand among global IT service companies, at US$3.7 billion as of January 2020. Samsung SDS has headquarters in South Korea and eight other overseas subsidiaries, one in America, Asia-Pacific, China, Europe, Latin America, Middle East, India, and Vietnam.

== History ==
Samsung SDS was established in 1985 as Samsung Data Systems as a subsidiary of Samsung Group, and was renamed Samsung SDS in 1997. The company was founded to provide ICT services to Samsung Group affiliates based on contemporary digital technologies, including mobile, social media, sensors, cloud technology, and others.

Initially, the company focused mainly on systems integration and IT outsourcing, before expanding into the fields of logistics, business process outsourcing (BPO) and IT-based manufacturing process platforms. More recently, the company has worked with Artificial intelligence, Blockchain, Cloud computing, data analytics, and security-based platforms. The company began to expand overseas in 1997 with the establishment of Samsung SDS America, followed by Samsung SDS China in 1999. The company currently has eight regional headquarters and offices in 41 countries. In 2014, the company launched a domestic initial public offering (IPO), which at the time was the 3rd largest ever in South Korea. In 2019, the company became the first Korean IT services company to surpass 10 trillion won in annual sales.

== Services ==
The company provides IT professional services, platforms and tools, and IT infrastructure, to the manufacturing, finance, and services industries. The company also provides logistics BPO services for global logistics and logistics specialized IT services. The company has a range of platforms, tools and services that use AI, blockchain, cloud, data analytics and security-based technologies.

=== IT professional services ===
Samsung SDS provides project-unit consulting and SI services by analyzing business problems using IT master plans, process innovation, information strategy planning, agility, and CX. It also provides application analysis, design and development services across different verticals such as business management (enterprise resource planning (ERP), supply chain management (SCM), customer relationship management (CRM), and manufacturing analysis (MES).

Through stable infrastructure services, the company provides cloud, data center, network and security services for various industries. The company's application outsourcing services support resources such as staffing, software, and information resources.

=== Platforms and systems ===
==== Platforms ====
The company's AI-based big data analytics platform, Brightics AI, provides analytical, visual, and conversational AI services. The platform incorporates machine learning, deep learning, natural language processing (NLP), and Chatbots, which can be adapted for different purposes. The platform is used in the manufacturing, construction, logistics, and retail sectors. The company also has an open-source version of the platform known as Brightics Studio.

Brightics IoT is an Internet of things platform designed to optimize the collection and processing of data from many devices as well as legacy systems. The platform supports a variety of different communication protocols such as MQTT, Constrained Application Protocol (CoAP), Bluetooth Low Energy (BLE), Zigbee, and Modbus, and is in use in the manufacturing, construction, smart city, and smart building industries.

The company launched Nexledger, its proprietary enterprise blockchain platform, in 2017. The platform was designed to integrate a wide variety of blockchain consensus algorithms such as Ethereum and Hyperledger Fabric. Nexledger, and its subsequent iteration Nexledger Universal, have been used in a variety of different industries. In conjunction with ABN AMRO Bank and the Port of Rotterdam, the company jointly developed the DELIVER platform for supporting documentation, asset transfer, and double payment prevention for international logistics shipments. Samsung SDS created a blockchain-based verification system for the Korean Federation of Banks so that customers can conduct transactions from multiple banks using a security certificate from only one bank. The company also collaborated with IBM to develop Accelerator, which improves transaction throughput on the Hyperledger Fabric by a factor of 10.

Samsung SDS released its enterprise AI software Brity in 2017, and changed its name to Brity RPA. Brity RPA is a conversational intelligent business automation tool that uses AI technologies such as chatbot, Optical character recognition (OCR) and machine learning to increase work productivity. The company is developing functions such as automatic recommendation of work processes based on analysis of user logs and developing tools in the direction of hyper-automation integrated with process mining and self-learning bots, which can automate a wider area of work processes and further enhance the effect of introduction. In May 2019, the company opened an in-house business automation portal training employees to use Brity RPA and apply it to repetitive tasks. By doing so, 15,000 employees saved 550,000 hours in nine months. The software reduced working hours across all business areas, including logistics, IT operations and purchasing, and improved the quality of inspections through reduced human error.

==== Systems ====
Samsung SDS launched its AI-based smart factory system Nexplant in 2016. The platform runs on the big data analytics platform Brightics and processes large amounts of data gathered from smart sensors deployed throughout the factory, speeding analysis and problem-solving in manufacturing processes. Samsung SDS provides AI software for manufacturers covering facilities, processes, inspection, and logistics. The software can analyze noise, vibration, heat, and the location of material logistics equipment to detect faults in advance and automatically resolve the cause of any abnormalities.

Samsung SDS also provides an integrated enterprise collaboration tool that supports secure instant messaging, file sharing, corporate, e-mail and calendar services to optimize work environments and to ensure ease-of-use. A cloud-based Brity EFSS system enables uploading, downloading, and sharing documents through a centralized storage space along with the ability to track different document versions and control user file access. The company also provides Brity Messenger, a corporate messenger that enables real-time chat, video chat, and screen sharing while Brity Mail securely accesses key business features from email while providing options for various approval paths and scheduling functions.

In June 2018, the company launched a blockchain-based finance platform, Nexfinance. The platform provides services such as digital identity, finance concierge, AI virtual assistant and automatic insurance payment. The platform's digital identity service uses blockchain technology, and the finance concierge uses AI and big data analytics. Nexfinance is an open platform that can be used with third-party software.

Nexshop analyzes customer data including foot traffic, demographics, preference, length of visit and response to in-store experiences, and allows retailers to show targeted content and personalized messages on displays throughout stores. Nexshop can also be used to optimize store layouts and staffing, or to maximize store space using digital signage and VR devices. The company announced in November 2019 that it had signed a strategic partnership with exhibition organizer Fiera Milano to use Samsung SDS digital technology in trade fairs and exhibitions in Europe.

Samsung SDS has also developed technology for the healthcare industry. Nexmed EHR manages patient records with digital records and automated forms to increase the efficiency of hospital operations, and analyzes patient information to support medical decisions. S-patch Cardio is a real-time cloud-based electrocardiogram monitoring tool using a wearable ECG device attached to patient's chest.

=== IT infrastructure services ===
Samsung SDS's cloud services were initially designed for the cloud computing needs of Samsung affiliates, and 90 percent of its sister companies' IT systems were migrated to the cloud. However, in 2018 the company announced that it planned to more aggressively target companies outside of the Samsung Group. These cloud services cover all areas of cloud computing. The Hybrid Cloud Platform supports cloud deployment, migration, monitoring, and management, as well as ensure robust stability and framework. The company also provides the infrastructure to support compute, storage, networking, and security necessary for cloud systems. As of May 2020, Samsung SDS operates 17 data centers around the world to support its cloud services.

For security systems, the company employs AI, threat intelligence and cryptography. AI and threat intelligence analyze, detect and respond to threats, while whitebox cryptography and homomorphic encryption provide end-to-end security for enterprise IT systems. These security systems consist of network security, endpoint security and threat monitoring, while security services consist of consulting, monitoring and cloud security services.

=== Logistics BPO services ===
Samsung SDS provides end-to-end services covering the entire logistics process with Cello, a platform that manages and optimizes each process in the supply chain in real time, planning transportation and analyzing results to identify the shortest delivery path information and various tools to cut logistics costs. The Cello platform consists of three main services: Cello BPO, a comprehensive logistics service covering consulting, transportation, warehouse management, and customs clearance; Cello Square, a collaborative online logistics platform; and Cello Plus, an end-to-end supply chain and logistics operation platform adapted for Industry 4.0.

== Corporate affairs ==
=== Management ===
Samsung SDS Board of Directors consists of three inside full-time directors and four external directors. The Board of Directors includes committees for business administration, recommending candidates for external directors, internal trading, compensation, and auditing.

Board of Directors
Names	Position(s)
Junehee Lee	CEO, Samsung SDS
Jung Tae Ahn	Executive VP and CFO, Samsung SDS
Hyung Joon Koo	Executive VP and Cloud Business Unit Leader, Samsung SDS
Jae-Man Yu	Outside Director, Partner of Lee&Ko
Hyun-Han Shin	Outside Director, Professor at Yonsei University, School of Business
Seung-Ah Cho	Outside Director, Professor at Seoul National University, College of Business Administration

=== Financial Information ===
Year	Revenue (KRW billion)	Operating Income (KRW billion)	Net Income (KRW billion)	Total Assets (KRW billion)
2016	8,180	627	514	6,842
2017	9,299	731	542	7,277
2018	10,034	877	639	8,014
2019	10,720	990	750	9,021
2020	11,017	871	453	9,155
