= Chung Yong-jin =

South Korean business executive (born 1968)

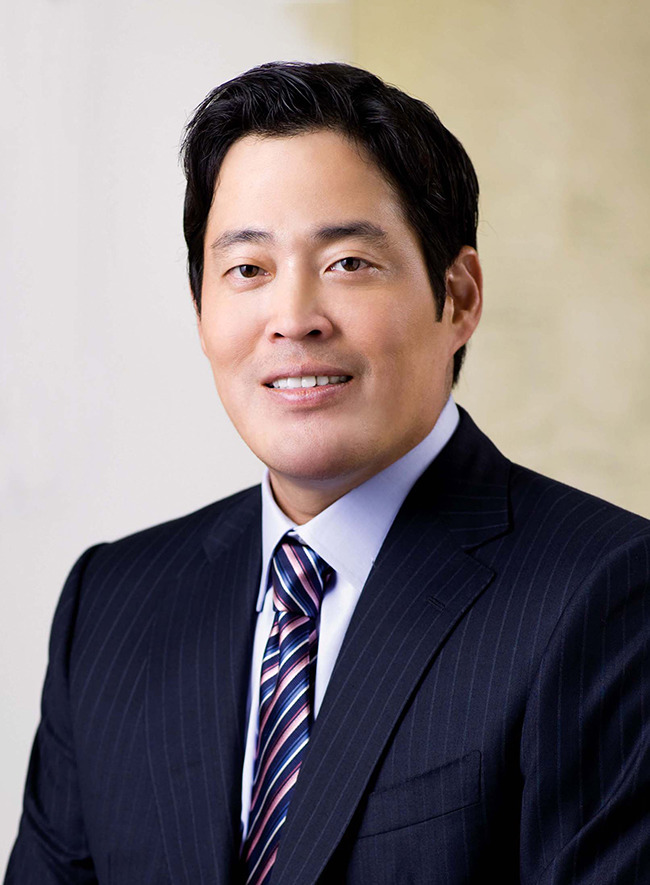
- Official portrait, 2009
- Born: September 19, 1968 (age 57); Seoul, South Korea
- Education: Brown University (BA)
- Occupation: Business executive
- Title: Chairperson of Shinsegae Owner of SSG Landers
- Spouses: Go Hyun-jung (m. 1995; div. 2003) Han Ji-hee (m. 2011)
- Children: 4
- Parents: Chung Jae-eun (father); Lee Myung-hee (mother)
- Relatives: Lee Jae-yong (cousin); Lee Jay-hyun (cousin)

Korean name
- Hangul: 정용진
- Hanja: 鄭溶鎭
- RR: Jeong Yongjin
- MR: Chŏng Yongjin

Chung Yong-jin (Korean: 정용진; born 19 September 1968) is a South Korean business executive who is the current chairperson of Shinsegae since March 2024.

He is among the richest people in South Korea. In April 2024, Forbes estimated his net worth as US$1.25 billion and ranked him 26th richest in the country. He is the grandson of National Assemblyman Chung Sang-hee and the grandson of Samsung Group Chairman Lee Byung-chul.

== Early life and education ==
Chung is the only son of Lee Myung-hee, chairwoman of Shinsegae Group and grandson of Samsung founder Lee Byung-chul. He graduated from Kyungbock High School and gained his Bachelor of Arts in Economics from Brown University.

== Personal life ==
Chung is the cousin of Samsung Group chairman Lee Jae-yong and CJ Group chairman Lee Jay-hyun.

In 1995, he married Go Hyun-jung and they had two children: Jung Hae-chan in 1998, and Jung Hae-in in 2000. They divorced in 2003 and he gained custody of both children.

In 2011, it was announced that he would marry flautist Han Ji-hee, daughter of the late former VP of Korean Air Han Sang-bum.

According to The Korea Economic Daily, Chung is close to the American Donald Trump administration, especially through a personal and business connection to Donald Trump Jr. The two are both involved in Rockbridge Network, a conservative political advocacy group aligned with Donald Trump; Chung is the group's Asia Chairman. Chung has also met with Omeed Malik, another conservative American businessman and member of 1789 Capital, which Trump Jr. joined in 2024.

Chung is Protestant and attends Onnuri Community Church.
