= Lee Byung-chul =

South Korean businessman (1910–1987)

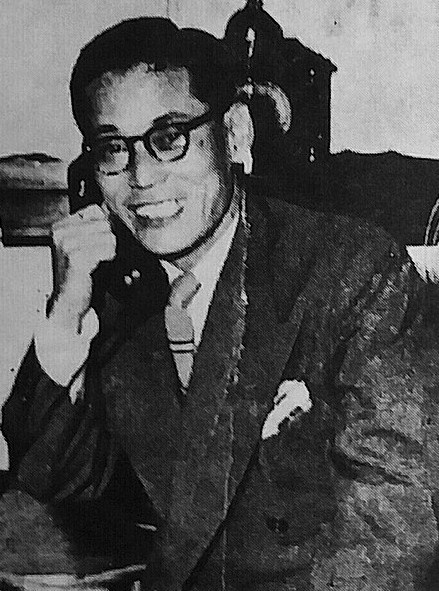
- Lee c. 1950
- Born: 12 February 1910; Uiryeong County, South Gyeongsang Province, Korean Empire
- Died: 19 November 1987 (aged 77); Seoul, South Korea
- Education: Waseda University (1930–1934) (dropped out)
- Occupation: Businessman
- Years active: 1938–1987
- Known for: Founding of Samsung and CJ Group
- Title: Chairman of Samsung (1938–1987)
- Spouse: Park Du-eul (m. 1926)
- Children: 10, including: Lee In-hee (daughter); Lee Maeng-hee (son); Lee Chang-hee (son); Lee Kun-hee (son); Lee Myung-hee (daughter)
- Relatives: Lee Jae-yong (grandson); Lee Boo-jin (granddaughter); Lee Jay-hyun (grandson); Chung Yong-jin (grandson); Miky Lee (granddaughter)

Korean name
- Hangul: 이병철
- Hanja: 李秉喆
- RR: I Byeongcheol
- MR: I Pyŏngch'ŏl

Art name
- Hangul: 호암
- Hanja: 湖巖
- RR: Hoam
- MR: Hoam
- Website: hoamfoundation.org

Lee Byung-chul (Korean: 이병철; 12 February 1910 – 19 November 1987) was a South Korean businessman who founded the Samsung Group, the country's largest chaebol (conglomerate). Lee founded Samsung in 1938, at the age of 28. He is widely recognized as one of the most successful business magnates in South Korean history.

== Early life and education ==
Lee was born on 12 February 1910 in Uiryeong County, South Gyeongsang Province, then part of the Korean Empire. He was born the youngest son of four siblings to father Lee Chan-woo and mother Kwon Jae-lim. He was the son of a wealthy land-owning yangban family, a branch of the Gyeongju Lee clan.

He attended high school at Joongdong High School in Seoul, and graduated in 1929.

In April 1930, he enrolled in the Department of Political Economy at Waseda University in Tokyo. Owing to health problems, he did not complete his studies, and withdrew from the programme in 1934. In 1970, in recognition of his achievements, Waseda University conferred an honorary doctorate upon him. He was also an active member of the Waseda Korean Alumni Association, where he took great care of younger compatriots such as Lotte founder Shin Kyuk-ho and POSCO chairman Park Tae-joon.

In 1982, Lee was awarded an honorary doctorate from Boston College.

== Career ==
=== Samsung ===
Lee established a trucking business and real estate business in Daegu on 1 March 1938, which he named Samsung Trading Co, the forerunner to Samsung. Samsung means (Korean: 삼성; lit. 'Three Stars') which explains the initial corporate logos.

By 1945, Samsung was transporting goods throughout Korea and to other countries. The company was based in Seoul by 1947.

=== Korean War ===
Samsung was one of the ten largest "trading companies" when the Korean War started in 1950.

With the conquest of Seoul by the North Korean army, Lee was forced to relocate his business to Busan. The massive influx of U.S. troops and equipment into Busan over the next year and a half of the war proved to be highly beneficial to Lee's trading company.

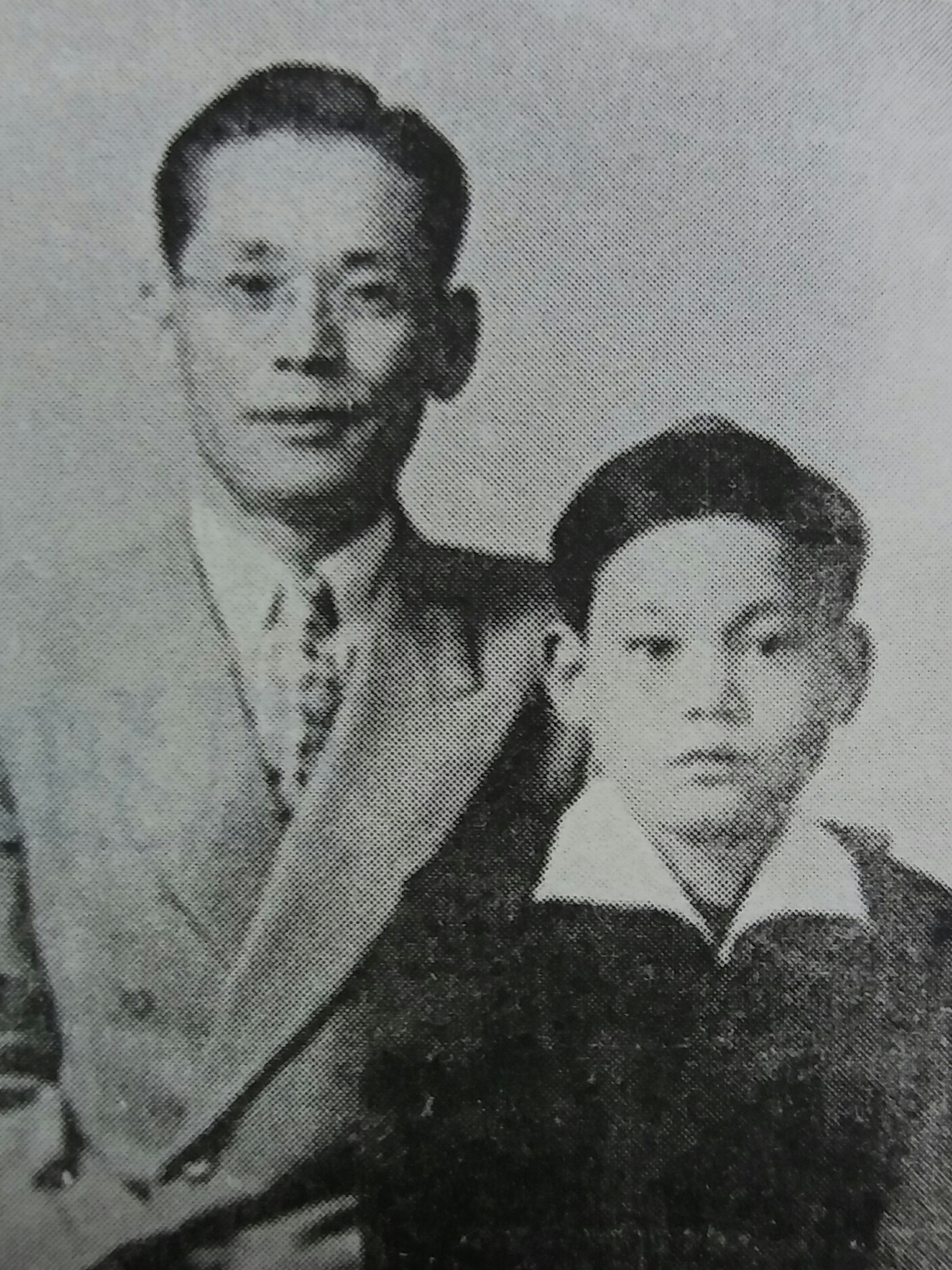
Lee (left) and his son Lee Kun-hee (right) in 1950

=== Federation of Korean Industries ===
In 1961, when Park Chung Hee seized power in the May 16 coup, Lee was in Japan and for some time he did not return to South Korea. Eventually, a deal was struck and Lee returned but Samsung had to give up control over the banks it acquired and follow economic directives from Park's government.

The first step of the Federation of Korean Industries was established in August 1961. The association was founded by Samsung Group chairman Lee Byung-chul.

Later in life, Lee served as chairman of the Federation of Korean Industries and was known as the richest man in Korea.

=== Cultural and art ===
In 1965, he established the Samsung Culture Foundation to promote a broad range of programs to enrich Korean cultural life.

=== Samsung Electronics ===
In 1969, Samsung Electronics Manufacturing (renamed Samsung Electronics) and later merged with Samsung-Sanyo Electric. Samsung Electronics Manufacturing had 45 employees and about US$250,000 sales in 1970 and it made household electronics exclusively.

== Personal life ==
=== Death ===
Lee died in 1987 in Seoul. After his death, Ho-Am Art Museum was opened to the public for tours. His collection of Korean art is considered one of the largest private collections in the country, featuring a number of art objects that have been designated "National Treasures" by the Korean government. Ho-Am is located a short distance from the Everland park, one of South Korea's popular amusement parks (Everland is also owned by the Samsung Group).

== Family tree ==
=== Lee's family tree ===
Lee's children with Park Du-eul

1. 1st daughter: Lee In-hee, The founder of Hansol and spouse of its former chairman, Dr. Cho Wan-hae, M.D
2. 1st son: Lee Maeng-hee, Founder of CJ Group (in which he lost the lawsuit alongside Lee Kun-hee), father of current CJ Group chairman Lee Jay-hyun
3. 2nd son: Lee Chang-hee, Founder of Saehan
4. 2nd daughter: Lee Suk-hee, spouse of LG board director Koo Cha-hak, younger brother of the emeritus chairman, Koo Cha-kyung and paternal uncle of the former deceased chairman, Koo Bon-moo
5. 3rd daughter: Lee Soon-hee
6. 4th daughter: Lee Deok-hee, widow of Lee Jeong-gi
7. 3rd son: Lee Kun-hee, 2nd chairman of Samsung, father of 3rd and present Samsung chairman Lee Jae-yong and Hotel Shilla president Lee Boo-jin
8. 5th daughter: Lee Myung-hee, spouse of Chung Jae-eun, chairwoman of Shinsegae group and mother of Chung Yong-jin.

Lee's children with Kuroda

1. 4th son: Lee Tae-whi
2. 6th daughter: Lee Hye-ja

== See also ==
- Samsung family

Business positions
Preceded by None	Chairman of the Board of the Samsung Group; March 1938 – December 1987	Succeeded by Lee Kun-hee
