= Lee Myung-hee =

South Korean businesswoman (born 1943)

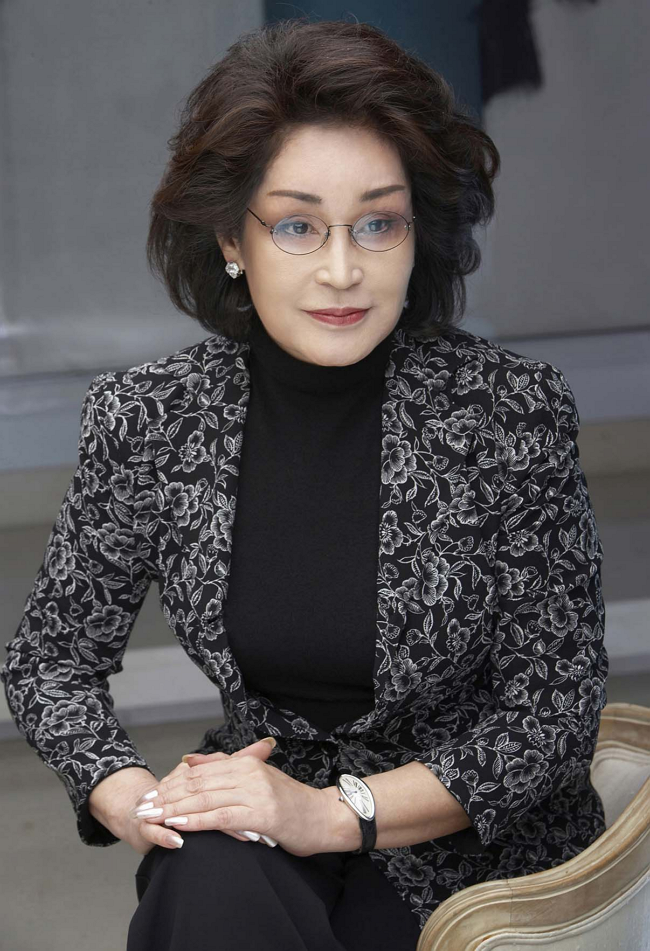
- Lee Myung-hee in 2016
- Born: 5 September 1943 (age 83); Uiryeong, South Gyeongsang Province, South Korea
- Education: Ewha Womans University
- Occupation: Chairman of Shinsegae Group
- Children: 2, including Chung Yong-jin
- Parents: Lee Byung-chul (father); Park Du-eul (mother)
- Relatives: Annie Moon (granddaughter)

Korean name
- Hangul: 이명희
- Hanja: 李明熙
- RR: I Myeonghui
- MR: I Myŏnghŭi

Lee Myung-hee (Korean: 이명희; born 5 September 1943) is a South Korean business magnate and the chairwoman of the Shinsegae Group. She is the youngest daughter of Lee Byung-chul, founder of the Samsung Group and the sister of the former late chairman Lee Kun-Hee. Lee became the company's chairwoman in 1997 following its separation from Samsung and is credited with growing it into the country's second-largest retailer. With an estimated net worth of $840 million, she is one of the wealthiest people in South Korea and was ranked 20th on Forbes 2017 list of 50 Richest Koreans.

== Biography ==
Lee was born in Uiryeong County to Samsung founder Lee Byung-chul and his first wife Park Du-eul as the youngest of eight children. She attended Ewha Girls' High School and then majored in art at Ewha Womans University before marrying a Seoul National University and Columbia-educated engineer, Chung Jae-eun, who served as the president of Samsung Electronics and is currently the honorary chairman of Shinsegae Group.

After ten years of being a homemaker, she became a sales executive at Shinsegae Department Store in 1979 and then its Chairwoman in 1997 after the company was separated from Samsung.

== Personal life ==
Lee's granddaughter is South Korean singer and AllDay Project member Annie Moon.
