= Lee Boo-jin =

South Korean businesswoman (born 1970)

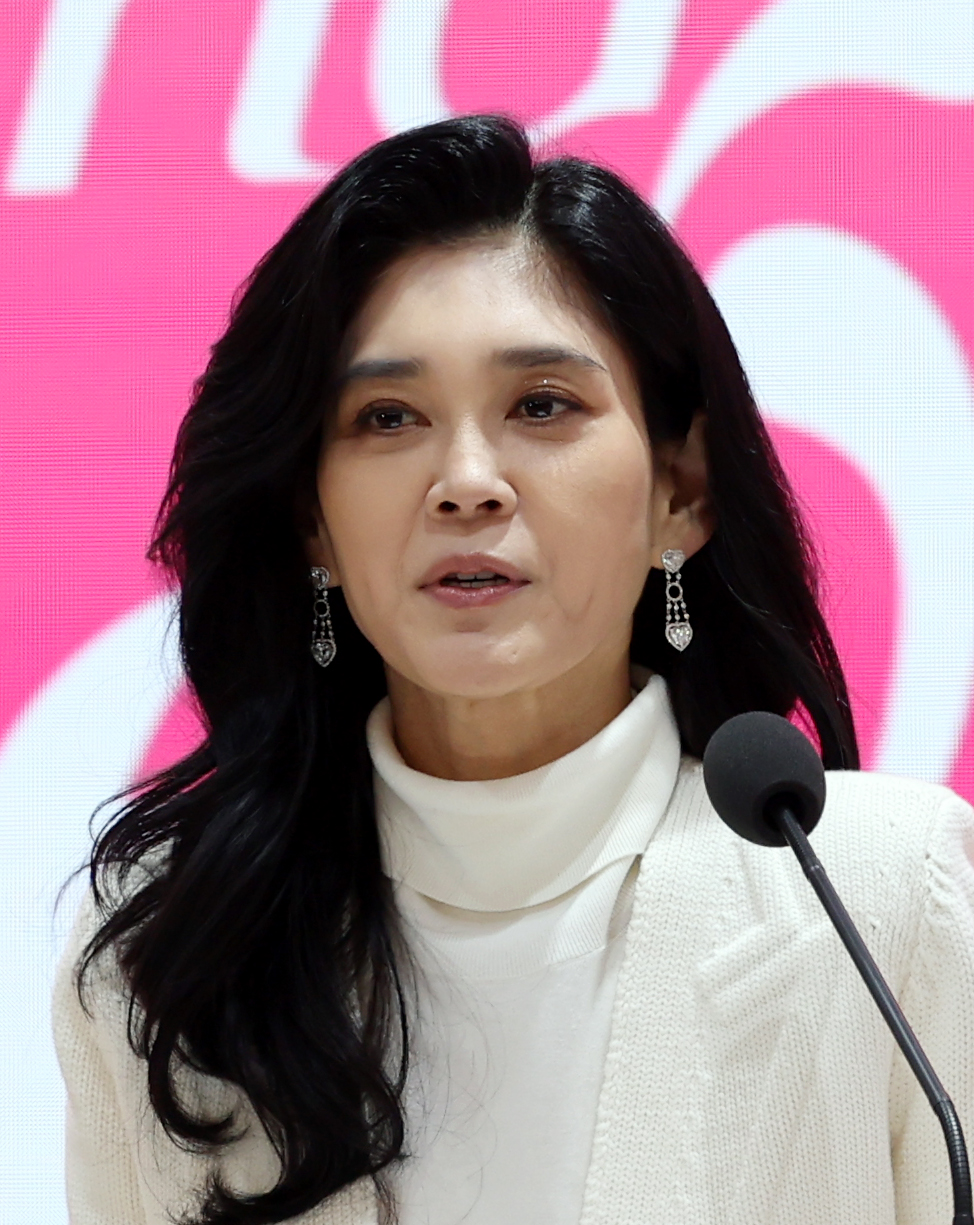
- Lee in 2024
- Born: October 6, 1970 (age 55); Seoul, South Korea
- Education: Yonsei University
- Occupation: Businesswoman
- Years active: 1995–present
- Title: CEO of Hotel Shilla
- Spouse: Im Woo-jae (m. 1999; div. 2020)
- Children: 1
- Parents: Lee Kun-hee (father); Hong Ra-hee (mother)
- Relatives: Lee Jae-yong (brother); Lee Seo-hyun (sister); Lee Yoon-hyung (sister); See list: Lee Jay-hyun (cousin); Hong Chin-Ki (maternal grandfather)

Korean name
- Hangul: 이부진
- Hanja: 李富眞
- RR: I Bujin
- MR: I Pujin

Lee Boo-jin (Korean: 이부진; born October 6, 1970) is a South Korean businesswoman who has served as president and chief executive of one of Seoul's leading hotels and conference centers, Hotel Shilla, since 2010. Lee has been dubbed by the media as "Little Lee Kun-hee" and is regarded as a successful businesswoman for her work at Hotel Shilla. She is the younger sister of Samsung Electronics executive chairman Lee Jae-yong, and the older sister of Lee Seo-hyun, chairman of Samsung Welfare Foundation.

She is among the richest people in South Korea. In June 2026, Forbes estimated her net worth as US$15.3 billion and ranked her the 2nd richest person in the country.

== Early life and education ==
A native of Seoul, South Korea, she is the daughter of Lee Kun-hee, the late billionaire chairman of Samsung, and Hong Ra-hee. She graduated from Daewon Foreign Language High School in Korea. She earned a bachelor's degree from Yonsei University

== Career ==
Lee began her career at Samsung Welfare Foundation in 1995.

In 2001, she joined Hotel Shilla, a member company of the Samsung Group, specializing in travel retail and the hospitality business. She has been the president and CEO of Hotel Shilla since December 2010.

Lee was formerly president of corporate strategy for Samsung Everland and an advisor for the trading department of Samsung C&T from December 2010 to December 2015, with the two companies merging to become Samsung C&T Corporation in September 2015.

Since 2015, she has been ranked on Forbes' lists of the World's 100 Most Powerful Women, ranking 90th in 2025.

She was an independent non-executive director of CITIC Limited from 2014 to 2019.

== Personal life ==
She lives in Seoul, South Korea.

In 1999, she married Im Woo-jae, known in the South Korean press as "Mr. Cinderella" because of his humble background, as an "employee of a security service affiliate of Samsung Group". They separated in 2012, and have one son together.

In a court ruling in July 2017, Lee was ordered to pay her ex-husband Im Woo-jae $7.6 million, as part of their divorce settlement, with Lee receiving sole custody of their son. Im allegedly counter-sued and sought $1.1 billion as a division of assets, one of the largest amounts ever requested in an asset split trial in South Korea. Their divorce was settled in January 2020 with Lee ordered to pay Im $12.1 million in an asset split.
