= CJ CheilJedang =

South Korean food company

CJ CheilJedang Corporation
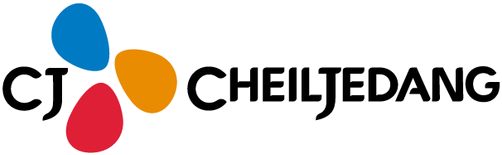
- Native name: 씨제이제일제당
- Formerly: Cheil Jedang Co. Ltd. (1953–2002); CJ Co. Ltd. (2002–2007)
- Type: Subsidiary
- Traded as: KRX: 097950
- Industry: Food processing
- Founded: August 1, 1953; 72 years ago
- Founder: Lee Byung-chul
- Headquarters: Jung-gu, Seoul,
- Area served: Worldwide
- Key people: Choi Eun-seok (CEO)
- Products: Food Ingredients, Pharmaceuticals and Biotechnology
- Revenue: ▲ ₩27.34 trillion (2025)
- Operating income: ▼ ₩1.23 trillion (2025)
- Net income: ▼ ₩417.0 billion (2025)
- Total assets: ▼ ₩29.74 trillion (2025)
- Total equity: ▼ ₩11.55 trillion (2025)
- Number of employees: 5,991 (2013) non-consolidated in Korea
- Parent: CJ Group
- Website: cj.co.kr/en

- CJ CheilJedang
- Hangul: CJ제일제당
- Hanja: CJ第一製糖
- RR: CJ jeil jedang
- MR: CJ cheil chedang

CJ CheilJedang Corporation (Korean: 씨제이제일제당) is a South Korean international food company based in Seoul that manufactures food ingredients, ambient, frozen and chilled packaged food products, pharmaceuticals and biotechnology. Its brands include Beksul, Bibigo, Gourmet and Hetbahn. Bibigo is well-known for mandu (Korean dumplings) in the global market.

== History ==
CJ Cheil Jedang was founded as 'Cheil Jedang' in August 1953 as a sugar and flour manufacturer and was originally part of Samsung Group, as their first manufacturing business. In July 1993 it spun off from Samsung and gained independent management, changing into a life and culture group with the entrance into the food service and entertainment industries. In 1996 it became the 'Cheil Jedang Group' with the official separation from Samsung Group completed in February 1997.

In October 2002, the CJ Group was launched and the official name changed to 'CJ Co., Ltd'. In September 2007 CJ Co., Ltd. again spun off as a business holding company and renamed 'CJ CheilJedang Co., Ltd' and CJ Group became a holding company for a group of food and entertainment-related subsidiaries based in South Korea. It has four main core businesses: Food & Food Service, Bio Pharma, Entertainment and Media, and Home Shopping & Logistics; and CJ Cheil Jedang was put under Food & Food Service.

In 2018, CJ CheilJedang acquired Kahiki Foods, an American food manufacturing company based in Columbus, Ohio. In 2019, CJ CheilJedang acquired Schwan's Company, a food manufacturing company based in Minnesota, United States.

== Businesses ==
Its four main business areas are food ingredients (including sugar, wheat, and oil), food (ambient, chilled and frozen food including HMR products), logistics, and biotechnology (including MSG, lysine), processed food and animal feed.

It has since expanded globally with offices in the U.S., China, Vietnam, Japan, and Germany. CJ packaged food products are currently exported to more than 100 countries.

== See also ==
- List of South Korean companies
