= Lee Kun-hee =

South Korean businessman (1942–2020)

- 이건희
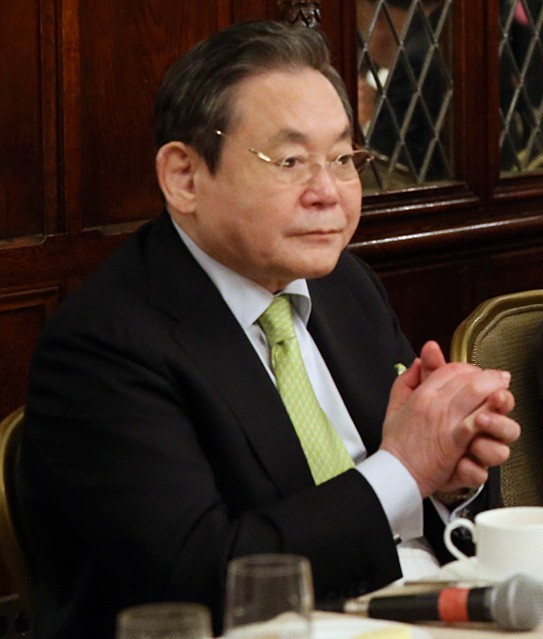
- Lee in 2013
- Born: 9 January 1942; Taikyu, Keishōhoku Prefecture, Korea, Empire of Japan
- Died: 25 October 2020 (aged 78); Seoul, South Korea
- Education: Waseda University (BS); George Washington University
- Occupation: Businessman
- Years active: 1966–2020
- Title: Chair of Samsung (1987–2008; 2010–2020)
- Spouse: Hong Ra-hee
- Children: Lee Jae-yong (son); Lee Boo-jin (daughter); Lee Seo-hyun (daughter); Lee Yoon-hyung (daughter)
- Parents: Lee Byung-chul (father); Park Du-eul (mother)
- Relatives: Lee Myung-hee (sister)

Korean name
- Hangul: 이건희
- Hanja: 李健熙
- RR: I Geonhui
- MR: I Kŏnhŭi
- IPA: iːɡʌnɣi

Lee Kun-hee (Korean: 이건희; 9 January 1942 – 25 October 2020) was a South Korean businessman who served as the chair of Samsung from 1987 to 2008 and from 2010 to his death in 2020. He is also credited with the transformation of Samsung to one of the world's largest business entities that engages in semiconductors, smartphones, electronics, shipbuilding, construction, and other businesses. Since Lee became the chair of Samsung, the company became the world's largest manufacturer of smartphones, memory chips, and appliances. He was the third son of Samsung founder Lee Byung-chul. With an estimated net worth of US$21 billion at the time of his death, he was the richest person in South Korea, a position that he had held since 2007.

He was convicted twice, once in 1996 and subsequently in 2008, for corruption and tax evasion charges, but was pardoned on both instances. In 2014, Lee was named the world's 35th most powerful person and the most powerful Korean by Forbes's list of the world's most powerful people along with his son, Lee Jae-yong.

== Early life ==
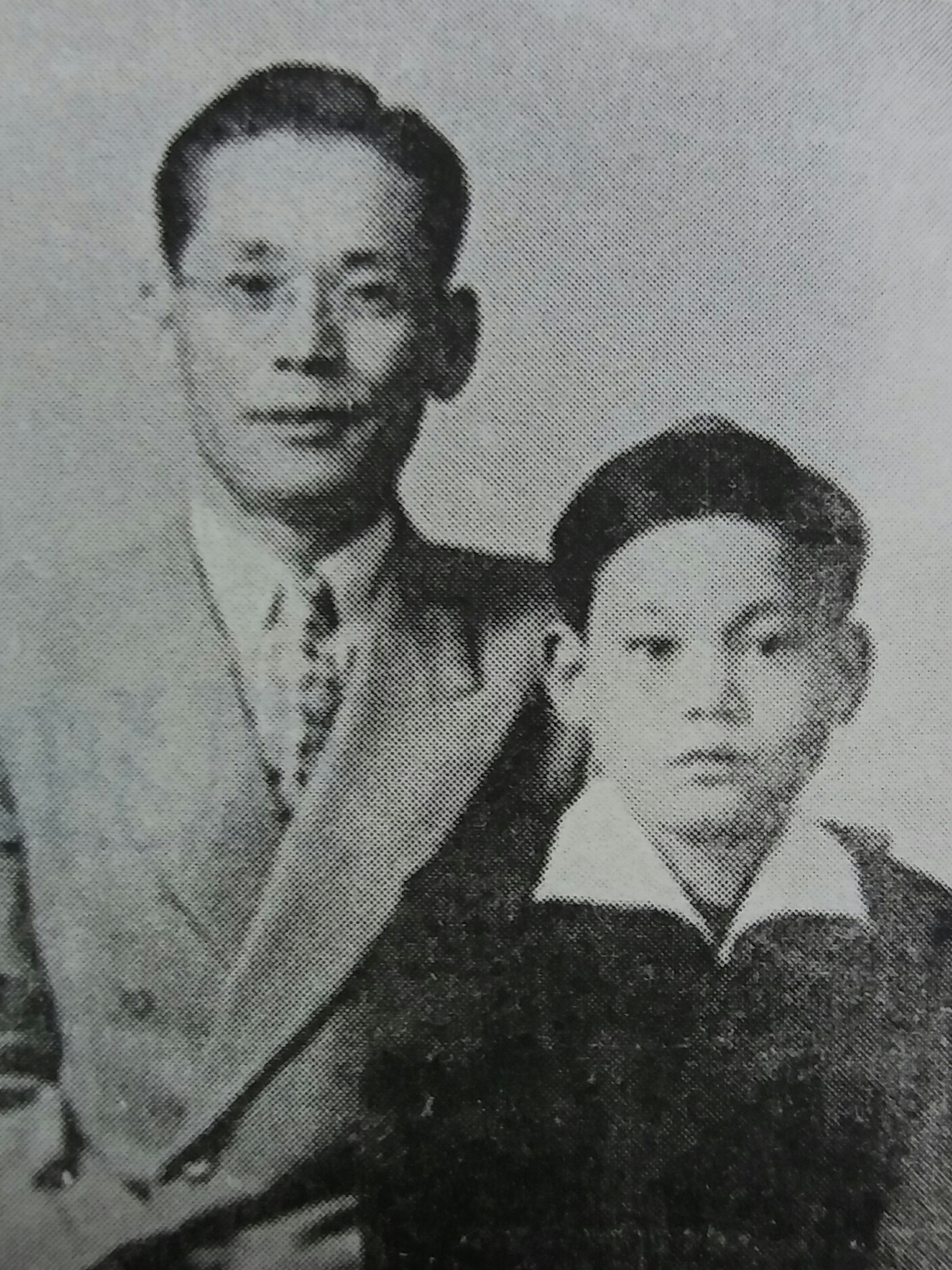
Young Lee Kun-hee with his father Lee Byung-chul

Lee Kun-hee was born on 9 January 1942 in Daegu, during the Japanese occupation of Korea. His father, Lee Byung-chul, founded the Samsung Group, initially as an exporter of fruit and dried fish. Lee Kun-hee studied economics at Waseda University in Tokyo, and was later educated at the George Washington University in the United States.

== Career ==
=== First period at Samsung ===
Lee joined the Tongyang Broadcasting Company (then an affiliate of the Samsung Group) in 1966, and later went on to work for Samsung's construction and trading company.

He took over the chairpersonship of the conglomerate on 24 December 1987, two weeks after the death of his father, Lee Byung-chul. In 1993, believing that Samsung Group was overly focused on producing large quantities of low-quality goods and was not prepared to compete in quality, Lee famously said, "Change everything except your wife and kids". This call was an attempt to drive innovation at the company and to face up to the competition at that time from rivals like Sony Corporation. In what is now known as the 'Frankfurt Declaration', he gathered his executives in the German city in 1993, and called for a change in the company's approach to quality, even if it meant lower sales. The company went on to become the largest manufacturer of televisions, outpacing Sony in 2006.

=== Scandals and controversies ===
Lee was convicted for having paid bribes to president Roh Tae-woo in 1996. He was subsequently pardoned by president Kim Young-sam.

On 14 January 2008, Korean police raided Lee's home and office in an ongoing probe into accusations that Samsung was responsible for a slush fund used to bribe influential prosecutors, judges, and political figures in South Korea. On 4 April 2008, Lee denied allegations against him in the scandal. After a second round of questioning by the South Korean prosecutors, on 11 April 2008, Lee was quoted by reporters as saying, "I am responsible for everything. I will assume full moral and legal responsibility." On 21 April 2008, he resigned and stated: "We, including myself, have caused troubles to the nation with the special probe; I deeply apologize for that, and I'll take full responsibility for everything, both legally and morally."

On 16 July 2008, The New York Times reported the Seoul Central District Court had found Lee guilty on charges of financial wrongdoing and tax evasion. Prosecutors requested that Lee be sentenced to seven years in prison and fined 350 billion won (approximately US$312 million). The court fined him 110 billion won (approximately US$98 million) and gave him a three-years suspended sentence. However, on 29 December 2009, South Korean president Lee Myung-bak pardoned Lee, stating that the intent of the pardon was to allow Lee to remain on the International Olympic Committee. In Lee Myung-bak's corruption trial, this pardon was revealed to have been in exchange for bribes; further bribery and other political corruption between former President Lee and Lee Kun-hee was also exposed.

Think Samsung, a 2010 book by Kim Yong-chul, former Samsung legal counsel, alleged that Lee was guilty of corruption. In particular, it claimed that he stole up to 10 trillion won (approximately US$8.9 billion) from Samsung subsidiaries, tampered with evidence, and bribed government officials to guarantee his son would succeed him.

=== Return to Samsung ===
On 24 March 2010, Lee announced his return to Samsung Electronics as its chair. He continued in this position until 2014, when he suffered an incapacitating heart attack and his son, Lee Jae-yong, became the Samsung group's de facto leader. He is credited with having transformed Samsung into the world's largest manufacturer of smartphones, televisions, and memory chips. At the time of his death, the company was worth US$300 billion, and with an estimated net worth US$20.7 billion per Bloomberg's billionaire index, he was the richest person in South Korea; a position that he had held since 2007.

Following his death, Lee's heirs were expected to face an estate tax of around US$10 billion, potentially resulting in dilution of the family's stake in the conglomerate. By 2026, the family had completed its $8 billion in payments. Although stakes were sold, Lee Jae-yong relied on dividends and personal loans to largely avoid sales.

== Personal life ==
Lee Kun-hee was married to Hong Ra-hee until his death. Hong is the daughter of Hong Jin-ki, the former chair of the JoongAng Ilbo and Tongyang Broadcasting Company.

His siblings and some of their children are also executives of major Korean business groups. Lee Boo-jin, his eldest daughter, is president and CEO of Hotel Shilla, a luxury hotel chain, as well as president of Everland Resort, a theme park and resort operator that is "widely seen as the de facto holding company for the conglomerate" according to the Associated Press.

Lee had four children: the eldest child and the only son, Lee Jae-yong (born 1968), and three daughters, Lee Boo-jin (born 1970), Lee Seo-hyun (born 1973), and Lee Yoon-hyung (1979–2005) who died by suicide.

Lee's older brother Lee Maeng-hee and older sister Lee Sook-hee initiated legal action against him in February 2012, asking a South Korean court to award them shares of Samsung companies totaling US$850 million (913.563 billion won), which they claim their father willed to them. Court hearings began in May 2012. On 6 February 2014, courts in South Korea dismissed the case.

=== Illness and death ===
Lee was treated for lung cancer in the late 1990s and was tested again for cancer in 2005, at the MD Anderson Medical Center in Houston, Texas, with no subsequent concerns being announced. He was hospitalized in Seoul in May 2014 after suffering a heart attack, and lapsed into a coma, which he remained in until his death on 25 October 2020, at the age of 78.

Lee's death triggered the largest inheritance tax bill in history, of 12 trillion won ($10.78 billion).

=== Posthumous ===
The heirs to the late Lee announced in the spring of 2021 that the businessman's multibillion-dollar collection of more than 23,000 works of art would be dispersed throughout public institutions in South Korea. Contrary to this announcement, the country's minister of culture, sports, and tourism, Hwang Hee, announced plans to build a new museum dedicated to the Lee collection.

On 28 April 2021, Lee's family announced a donation of 300 billion won to support children suffering from pediatric cancers and rare diseases, as part of a broader social contribution initiative announced alongside plans for inheritance tax payments. The funds were intended to help cover the medical expenses of young patients and improve access to treatment.

The donation led to the establishment of the Lee Kun-hee Pediatric Cancer and Rare Disease Project in May 2021, with Seoul National University Children's Hospital serving as the lead institution. According to Seoul National University Hospital, between the project's launch and September 2026, a total of 22,646 patients had been diagnosed and 14,757 had received treatment through the initiative. The project is scheduled to continue until 2030.

Business positions
Preceded by Lee Byung-chul	Chairman of Samsung Group; December 1987 – April 2008	Succeeded by Lee Soo-bin
Preceded by Lee Soo-bin	Chairman of Samsung Group; March 2010 – October 2020	Succeeded by Lee Jae-yong
