= Lee Jae-yong =

South Korean business executive (born 1968)

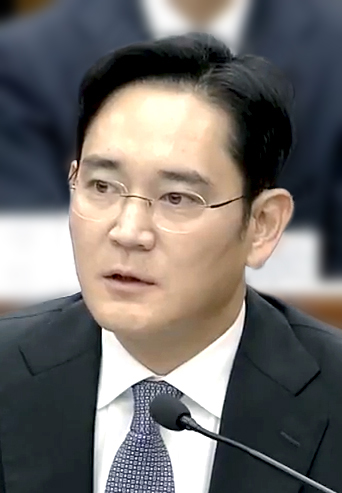
- Lee in December 2016
- Born: June 23, 1968 (age 58); Washington, D.C., U.S.
- Other name: Jay Y. Lee
- Education: Seoul National University (BA); Keio University (MBA)
- Occupation: Business executive
- Employer: Samsung (since 1991)
- Title: Chairman of Samsung (since 2022)
- Spouse: Lim Se-ryung (m. 1998; div. 2009)
- Children: 2
- Parents: Lee Kun-hee (father); Hong Ra-hee (mother)
- Relatives: Lee family (Samsung)
- Criminal information
- Status: Pardoned on August 12, 2022 (4 years ago)
- Convictions: Bribery; embezzlement

Details
- Date apprehended: February 17, 2017 (9 years ago)

Korean name
- Hangul: 이재용
- Hanja: 李在鎔
- RR: I Jaeyong
- MR: I Chaeyong

Lee Jae-yong (Korean: 이재용; born June 23, 1968) is a South Korean business executive who has served as the executive chairman of Samsung, one of South Korea's most valuable companies. Since joining Samsung in 1991, Lee has since held various positions in the company. According to Forbes, he has been South Korea's wealthiest person with a net worth of over US$20 billion as of November 2026.

Born in Washington, D.C. to the family that controls the Samsung conglomerate, Lee graduated from Keio University with a master's degree in business administration. In 2017, Lee was convicted of bribery, embezzlement, and concealment of criminal proceeds. He served a prison sentence until being pardoned by President Yoon Suk Yeol in August 2022 and later in October, he rejoined Samsung to serve as the chairman. He has also been named to Forbes list of the world's top 50 billionaires.

== Early life and education ==
Lee was born in Washington, D.C., United States to Lee Kun-hee and Hong Ra-hee.

He attended Kyungbock High School. He received his Bachelor of Arts degree in East Asian history from Seoul National University, and his Master of Business Administration degree from Keio University, which is a rival university of his father and grandfather's alma mater, Waseda University, Tokyo. Lee is fluent in his native language Korean as well as non-native languages such as English and Japanese.

== Career ==
=== 1991–present: Career at Samsung ===
Lee started working for Samsung in 1991. He began serving as Vice President of Strategic Planning and then as "Chief Customer Officer", a management position created exclusively for Jae-yong. His prospects for future company leadership dimmed when his father Kun-hee stepped down as Chairman due to tax evasion.

In December 2009, however, his succession prospects were revived when Lee became the chief operating officer of Samsung Electronics.

Since December 2012, he has been vice chairman of Samsung. He is one of the main shareholders of Samsung's financial services subsidiary, owning 11 percent of Samsung SDS. He has been described as having "been groomed to take over the family firm".

=== Monetary kickbacks, perjury, arrest and conviction ===
In January 2017, special prosecutors of the Supreme Prosecutors' Office of the Republic of Korea accused Lee of bribery, embezzlement and perjury. Lee was questioned for more than 22 hours. The charges came as part of a "vast influence-peddling case" that led to the impeachment of South Korean President Park Geun-hye the preceding month. Lee was charged with bribing President Park Geun-hye and her close friend Choi Soon-sil.

An initial request for an arrest warrant was rejected by the Seoul Central District Court in mid-January 2017. In February 2017, Lee was formally indicted, and arrested after the Seoul Central District Court issued a warrant. Lee was charged with "offering US$38 million in bribes to four entities controlled by a friend of then-President Park Geun-hye, including a company in Germany set up to support equestrian training for the daughter of one of Park's friends, Choi Soon-sil" and "Prosecutors alleged the bribes were offered in exchange for government help with a merger that strengthened Lee's control over Samsung at a crucial time for organizing a smooth leadership transition after his father fell ill." After his arrest, Samsung admitted to making contributions to two nonprofit foundations allegedly controlled by Choi and her Germany-based firm but denied such contributions were related to the 2015 merger. A spokesman for Samsung said, "We will do our best to ensure that the truth is revealed in future court proceedings."

The case attracted the attention of the South Korean public; public opinion had turned against chaebols, whose influence on society angered many.

Lee was found guilty on each charge by a three-judge panel of Seoul Central District Court in August 2017 and was sentenced to five years in prison (prosecutors had sought a 12-year sentence). In February 2018, the Seoul High Court reduced his prison sentence to 2.5 years, and suspended his prison sentence, leading to Lee's release after one year of detention. Subsequently, the Supreme Court of South Korea sent the case back to Seoul High Court, which held a retrial. In January 2021, Lee was sentenced to two years and six months in prison by Seoul High Court, which found him "guilty of bribery, embezzlement and concealment of criminal proceeds" worth about ₩8.6 billion (US$7.8 million, £5.75 million), and found that Samsung's independent compliance committee, established in 2020, was not yet fully effective. Lee was returned to prison.

=== 2021–2022: Pardon ===
In mid-2021, the United States Chamber of Commerce, a lobbying group of American companies, joined South Korean business groups to urge the president to pardon Lee, arguing that the billionaire executive can help strengthen U.S. President Joe Biden's efforts to end American dependence on computer chips produced overseas amid the 2020–2023 global chip shortage. Lee was released on parole from the Seoul Detention Center in Uiwang on August 13, 2021; the South Korean government argued that the release was in the national interest. His parole conditions included business restrictions for five years and requiring permission before travelling outside South Korea. Upon leaving prison, Lee apologized, bowing to reporters and saying: "I've caused much concern for the people. I deeply apologize. I am listening to the concerns, criticisms, worries, and high expectations for me. I will work hard."

In August 2021, The Korea Herald reported that Lee retained his title as Samsung's "Vice-Chairman" despite not drawing a salary or being registered as an executive in compliance with his work ban.

In August 2022, President Yoon Suk Yeol granted a pardon to Lee, citing Samsung's importance to the economy; the pardon opened the door for Lee to take up leadership of the conglomerate. Since October 2022, Lee returned to Samsung to serve as the executive chairman.

== Public image ==
According to an article in Reuters, Lee is known for his "cold" determination and polite, quiet demeanor. Lee is known to reply personally to e-mails, and assumes a light-hearted attitude with reporters.

== Personal life ==
Lee has one son, Lee Ji-ho (born 2000), and one daughter, Lee Won-joo (born 2004), with his ex-wife Lim Se-ryung. Lim is the Vice Chairwoman of Daesung Group. She filed for divorce in 2009.

Lee is the cousin of CJ Group chairman Lee Jay-hyun and Shinsegae Group CEO Chung Yong-jin.

Lee enjoys golf and horse riding.

=== 2021 drug conviction ===
On October 26, 2021, Lee was convicted for illegally using the drug propofol multiple times between 2015 and 2020 from a plastic surgery clinic. He was sentenced to a fine of ₩70 million (US$60,055).

=== Samsung Biologics accounting fraud allegations ===
Allegations of accounting fraud at Samsung Biologics were repeatedly raised in connection with Lee Jae-yong's succession to the leadership of the Samsung Group. The case was aggressively pursued by prosecutors including Yoon Suk-yeol, Han Dong-hoon, and Lee Bok-hyeon, who had previously served on the special counsel team that established Samsung's bribery charges during the 2016 political scandal.

Prosecutors framed the investigation not merely as a case of accounting irregularities, but as part of a broader inquiry into the succession of managerial control at Samsung Electronics. In court, prosecutors argued that the group needed to merge Samsung C&T, which held shares of Samsung Electronics, into Cheil Industries in order to facilitate Lee's succession and strengthen his control; that Samsung Biologics, a subsidiary of Cheil Industries, and its own subsidiary Samsung Bioepis were deliberately overvalued to produce a merger ratio favorable to Cheil Industries; and that the company committed accounting fraud by concealing details of call options held by its joint-venture partner.

In 2020, a prosecution investigation review committee took up the accounting fraud allegations together with the allegedly improper merger of Samsung C&T and Cheil Industries, and accepted Samsung's position that no illegal conduct had occurred, recommending against indictment. Prosecutors nonetheless indicted Lee, and the matter proceeded to trial. On 17 July 2025, the Supreme Court of Korea upheld the lower courts' rulings and finalized Lee's acquittal on all charges.
