= Samsung Card =

South Korean company

Samsung Card Co, Ltd.
- Native name: 삼성카드
- Formerly: Sejong Credit Card (1983–1988); Samsung Credit Card (1988–1995)
- Type: Public
- Traded as: KRX: 029780
- Industry: Credit Cards
- Founded: 1 March 1983; 43 years ago
- Headquarters: 67, Sejong-daero, Jung-gu, Seoul, South Korea
- Area served: Greater Tokyo Area; Most of South Korea; New York metropolitan area
- Key people: Kim Yi-tae (CEO)
- Revenue: ▲ ₩2.7898 trillion (2024)
- Operating income: ▲ ₩885.4 billion (2024)
- Net income: ▲ ₩664.6 billion (2024)
- Total assets: ▲ ₩29.4941 trillion (2024)
- Total equity: ▲ ₩8.4862 trillion (2024)
- Owner: Samsung Life Insurance (71.87%); Treasury stocks (7.9%); National Pension Service (6.02%); Employee stock ownership (0.2%)
- Number of employees: 2,002
- Parent: Samsung Group
- Website: Official website in Korean

Samsung Card Co, Ltd. (Korean: 삼성카드) is a South Korean credit card company. Samsung Card was established in 1988 as a technical and business company licensed by Samsung Electronics. Headquartered in Seoul, South Korea, Samsung Card merged with Samsung Capital in 2004. The company is owned by Samsung Life Insurance (71.9%). By the end of 2017, the number of individual credit card users was 9.64 million, and the asset value of products was 21,181.9 billion won. Total billings (cumulative) in 2017 is 122,217.3 billion won.

== List of Past Executives ==
=== Chairman & CEO ===
- Lee, Pil-Gon (1994)

=== Vice Chairman ===
- Hwang, Hak-Su (1995–1996)
- Choi, Do-Seok (2009–2011)

=== President & CEO ===
- Jeon, Beol-Jae (1978–1983)
- Choi, Joong-Yeon (1984–1988)
- Lee, Seung-Young (1988–1993)
- Nam, Jung-Woo (1993–1995)
- Lee, Kyung-Woo (1998–2003)
- Yoo, Seok-Ryul (2003–2009)
- Park, Keun-Hee (2004–2005)
- Choi, Chi-Hun (2011–2014)
- Won, Ki-Chan (2014–2020)
- Kim, Dae-Hwan (2022–)

=== Executive Vice Presidents ===
- Lee, Siyong (1993–1994)
- Lee, Kyung-Woo (1997–1998)
- Lee, In-Jae (2018–2019)
- Kim, Dae-Hwan (2020–2021)

=== Executive Director ===
- Bae, Myung-Ho (1983–1984)

== See also ==
- Economy of South Korea
- Samsung Group
