= Young Sohn =

American businessman

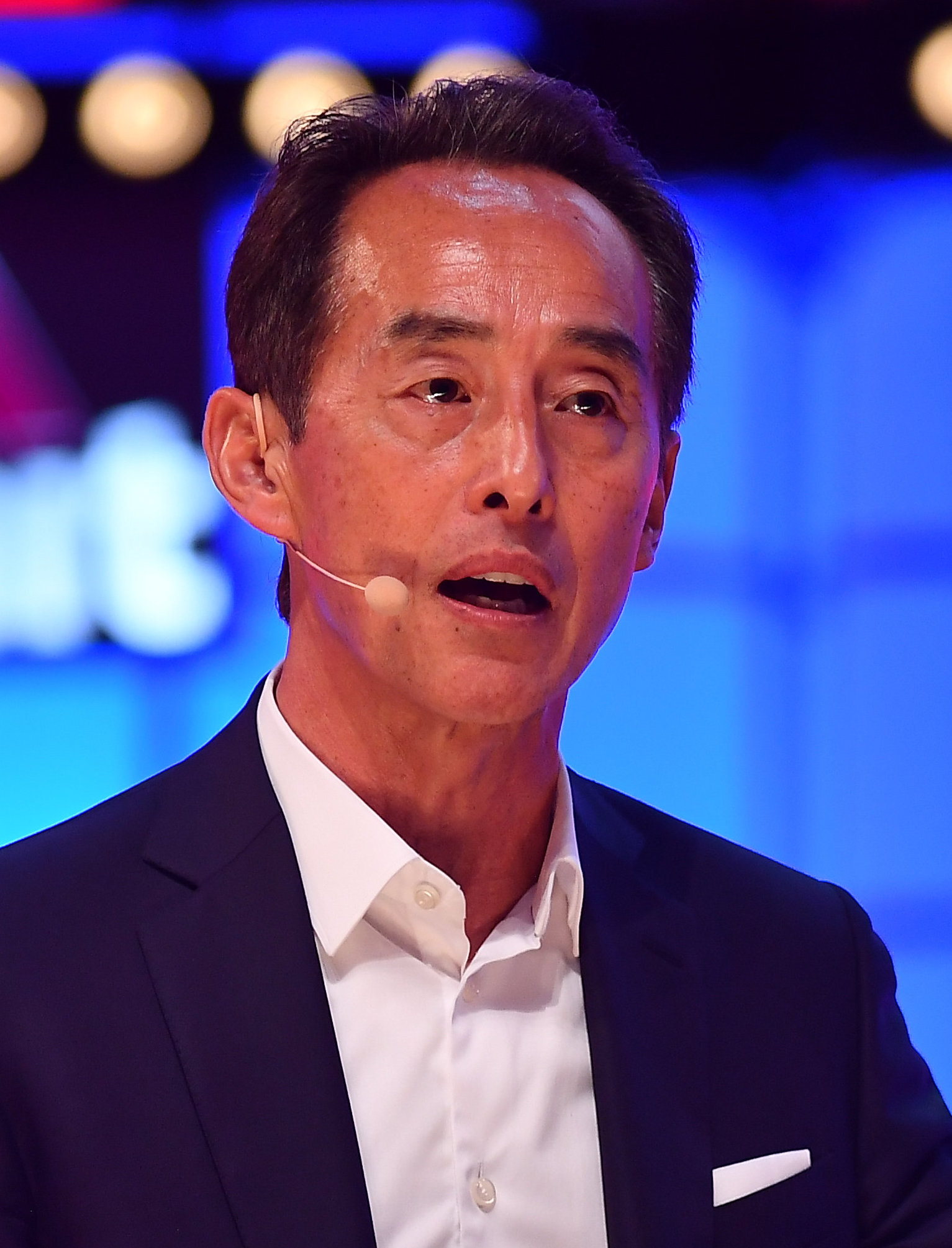
- Sohn at the 2018 Web Summit
- Born: Seoul, South Korea
- Education: University of Pennsylvania; MIT Sloan School of Management
- Known for: Former President of Samsung Electronics

Korean name
- Hangul: 손영권
- RR: Son Yeonggwon
- MR: Son Yŏnggwŏn

Young Sohn (Korean: 손영권) is an American tech executive, entrepreneur, and venture investor focused on deep tech, AI, robotics, and next-gen computing. He is a founding managing partner at Walden Catalyst Ventures, an early-stage venture capital firm investing globally in deep tech across AI, semiconductors and robotics. Sohn is also the Chairman of HARMAN International, and serves on the board of Cadence Design Systems and ARM.

He was formerly President and Chief Strategy Officer of Samsung Electronics, where he led the company’s strategic push into automotive, AI, cloud and infrastructure. Sohn was instrumental in Samsung’s $8B acquisition of HARMAN, and launched the Samsung Strategy and Innovation Center.

He has been called "the best-connected chip executive in the semiconductor industry."

== Early life and education ==
Sohn was born in Seoul and grew up in Bowie, Maryland. Sohn holds a B.S. in Electrical Engineering from the University of Pennsylvania and an M.S. from MIT Sloan School of Management.

== Operator, Builder & Scaler ==
Sohn began his career at Intel, where he launched the PC chipset business and brokered Intel’s first JV with Samsung. He also formed the company's inaugural joint venture with Samsung Electronics. He held the President role at Quantum Corporation, Agilent Semiconductor (now Broadcom) and Oak Technology, where he led strategic pivots and successful exits. As CEO of Inphi Corporation, Sohn guided the company to a successful IPO in 2010, cementing its role in high-speed data infrastructure. He also served as senior advisor at Silver Lake Partners.

Sohn joined Intel as a product marketing manager and later became its director of new business development. As director of new business development, Sohn oversaw the creation of Intel's PC chipset business. He also formed the company's inaugural joint venture with Samsung Electronics. Sohn was Vice President of Marketing, and later, Co-President of Quantum Corporation. He was also appointed president of the company's Storage Group. Sohn was a chairman and chief executive officer at Oak Technology, a digital media semiconductor company. During his time with the company, he oversaw the acquisition by Zoran Corporation.

== Samsung: Scaling Innovation Across Sectors ==
Joining Samsung Electronics in 2012, Young Sohn became the company’s President and led global corporate strategy. He founded the Samsung Strategy and Innovation Center (SSIC), where he launched major initiatives across frontier technologies, including the Samsung Catalyst Fund, with investments across cloud and data infrastructure, biotech, quantum computing, artificial intelligence, autonomous systems, sensors, networking & 5G.

== Philanthropy & Global Tech Ecosystem Leadership ==
Sohn co-founded the Extreme Tech Challenge (XTC), the world’s largest startup competition aligned with the UN Sustainable Development Goals (SDGs).
