= Samsung Securities =

South Korean company

Samsung Securities Co., Ltd.
- Native name: 삼성증권 (三星證券)
- Formerly: Hanil Investment & Finance; Kookje Securities
- Type: Public
- Traded as: KRX: 016360
- Industry: Financial services
- Founded: October 19, 1982; 43 years ago
- Headquarters: Seoul, South Korea,
- Key people: Seok Hoon Chang (CEO)
- Revenue: ▲KRW 2.40 trillion (2021)
- Net income: ▲KRW 965.34 billion (2021)
- Total assets: ▲KRW 65.71 trillion (2021)
- Total equity: ▲KRW 6.08 trillion (2021)
- Owners: Samsung Life Insurance (29.60%); National Pension Service (11.30%)
- Number of employees: 2,397 (2021)
- Parent: Samsung
- Website: www.samsungsecurities.com

Samsung Securities Co., Ltd. (Korean: 삼성증권) is a South Korean financial services company headquartered in Seoul, South Korea, and a subsidiary of Samsung Group. It is one of the largest securities companies in Korea.

== History ==
On 19 October 1982, Hanil Investment & Finance was established.

In 1988, the company was publicly listed on the Korea Exchange.

In 1991, the company changed its name to Kookje Securities.

In 1992, the company was incorporated into the Samsung Group and was rebranded to Samsung Securities.

In 1996, the company attempted to set up a joint venture with J.P. Morgan & Co. to sell mutual funds in Korea but by 1997, the venture failed. In 1998, the company was the first to sell mutual funds in Korea.

In 2000, the company merged with Samsung Investment Trust.

In 2014, the company's ownership of Samsung Asset Management was transferred to Samsung Life Insurance.

In 2018, the company set up a team specializing in analysing investments related to North Korea, the first in the industry to do so according to a statement issued.

The company has signed partnerships with various companies. These include Rothschild & Co (2008), Neuberger Berman (2014), KGI Securities (2016) and Societe Generale (2018).

The company has opened offices overseas. These include London (1996), New York (1998) and Hong Kong (2001).

== 2018 Samsung fat-finger error ==
On 8 April 2018, an employee of Samsung Securities mistakenly distributed shares worth US$100 billion to employees. The error happened when the company tried to pay a dividend to about 2,000 employees who participated in the company stock ownership plan. The intent was to give each of those employees 1,000 South Korean won, worth about US$1, but instead issued 2.8 billion shares. These shares were worth about 112.6 trillion won, or 30 times the market capitalization of the company.

The error caused the price of the company's stock to drop by 11 percent within a day and to fluctuate after that. By 7 May 2018, the company stated that it would file criminal lawsuits against employees who sold their shares during the fat finger incident.
