= IMarketKorea =

iMarketKorea 아이마켓코리아
- Company type: Public
- Traded as: KRX: 122900
- Founded: 2000
- Headquarters: Seoul, South Korea
- Key people: Founder : Man-Young Hyun, CEO : Inbong Nam
- Revenue: 3590 billion Won
- Number of employees: 500
- Website: https://imarketkorea.com/en/

iMarketKorea (Korean: 아이마켓코리아) is a member of the Samsung Group that provides procurement services and MRO goods. Initially created to be used as a procurement arm for the Samsung Group, iMarketKorea's revenue comes primarily from business-to-business transactions.

Samsung iMarketKorea is Korea's leading business-to-business e-procurement service provider. The company manages over one million products with a turnover of 979 billion Won as of 2007. Internationally, iMarketKorea operates in North America, South America, Asia, and Europe.

== History ==
Samsung iMarketKorea was established on December 20, 2000, by members of the Samsung Group in order to consolidate procurement operations. Its customer base has expanded beyond the Samsung Group and iMarketKorea currently provides services for over 349 clients including the CJ Corporation, Hansol, Rockwell Automation, ING, Standard Chartered, Woori Bank and Union Steel.

- 2000: iMarketKorea, Inc. is established by Samsung Group
- 2001: Received Minister of Commerce, Industry, and Energy Award in e-Commerce
- 2002: Received Minister of Information & Communication Award in e-Commerce
- 2005: Strategic partnership established with Samsung America Inc.
- 2006: Ordered MRO bid for PPS
- 2007: Overseas Global Purchasing System Open CRM Fair Customer Satisfaction Management Award
- 2008: Supply contract with Korea Medical Association
- 2009: GSA certification and USFK delivery
- 2010: Listed on the Stock Exchange (KOSPI) for the first time as a purchasing agency
- 2011: Incorporated Interpark Group as an affiliate
- 2012: Established US subsidiary (iMarketAmerica) Development of next generation purchasing system 'IMK Mall'
- 2013: Established iMarketXian in China iMarketVietnam in Vietnam
- 2014: Established Suzhou, China (iMarketFocus) Acquired drug distributor Anyeon Care Acquired AEO certification
- 2015: Acquired 'Cubbridge,' a wholesale and retail company of office supplies
- 2018: Selected as an excellent labor-management culture company by the Ministry of Employment and Labor
- 2022: Established EU subsidiary (iMarketEurope in Hungary)

== Corporate Affairs ==
=== Key Business Areas ===
Samsung iMarketKorea provides procurement outsourcing services for MRO goods and raw materials as well as offering procurement consulting services. iMarketKorea relies on economies of scale to lower purchasing costs and pass savings onto customers who lack the purchasing power to receive bulk order discounts. The procurement service consists of catalog management, procurement management, sourcing management, logistics management, and billing & payment management.
