= Samsung Fire & Marine Insurance =

South Korean company

- Native name: 삼성화재해상보험 (三星火災海上保險)
- Type: Public
- Traded as: KRX: 000810
- Industry: Insurance
- Founded: 1952; 74 years ago
- Headquarters: Seoul, South Korea
- Key people: Munhwa Lee (CEO)
- Products: Property & casualty insurance, automobile insurance, long-term insurance, general insuranec
- Revenue: ▲US$ 15.6 billion (2012)
- Net income: ▲US$ 0.7 billion (2012)
- Total assets: ▲US$ 40.5 billion (2012)
- Total equity: ▲US$ 7.8 billion (2012)
- Owners: Samsung Life Insurance (14.98%); National Pension Service (9.73%); Samsung Foundation (3.42%)
- Number of employees: 5,406 (2010)
- Parent: Samsung
- Rating: A++ (from A.M. Best)
- Website: www.samsungfire.com

Samsung Fire & Marine Insurance (SFMI) (Korean: 삼성화재) is a South Korean insurance company based in Seoul. Its business portfolio includes automobile insurance, long-term insurance, general insurance (commercial lines), enterprise risk management, and annuities. It was approved to become a subsidiary of its largest shareholder, Samsung Life Insurance, in April 2025.

Incorporated on January 26, 1952, under the name of "Korea Anbo Fire Marine Reinsurance Co.", the company changed its name to Samsung Fire & Marine Insurance Co., Ltd., in December 1993, after its takeover by Samsung Group back in 1958. Samsung Fire & Marine Insurance, is operating property and casualty insurance business and third-party insurance business defined by the Korea Insurance Business Act, while also engaging in providing financial services and instruments approved by relevant laws and regulations including the Korea Financial Investment Services and Capital Markets Act.

As of 2015, Samsung Fire & Marine Insurance had seven overseas subsidiaries in Indonesia, Vietnam, China, Brazil, Europe, US, and Singapore.

== History ==
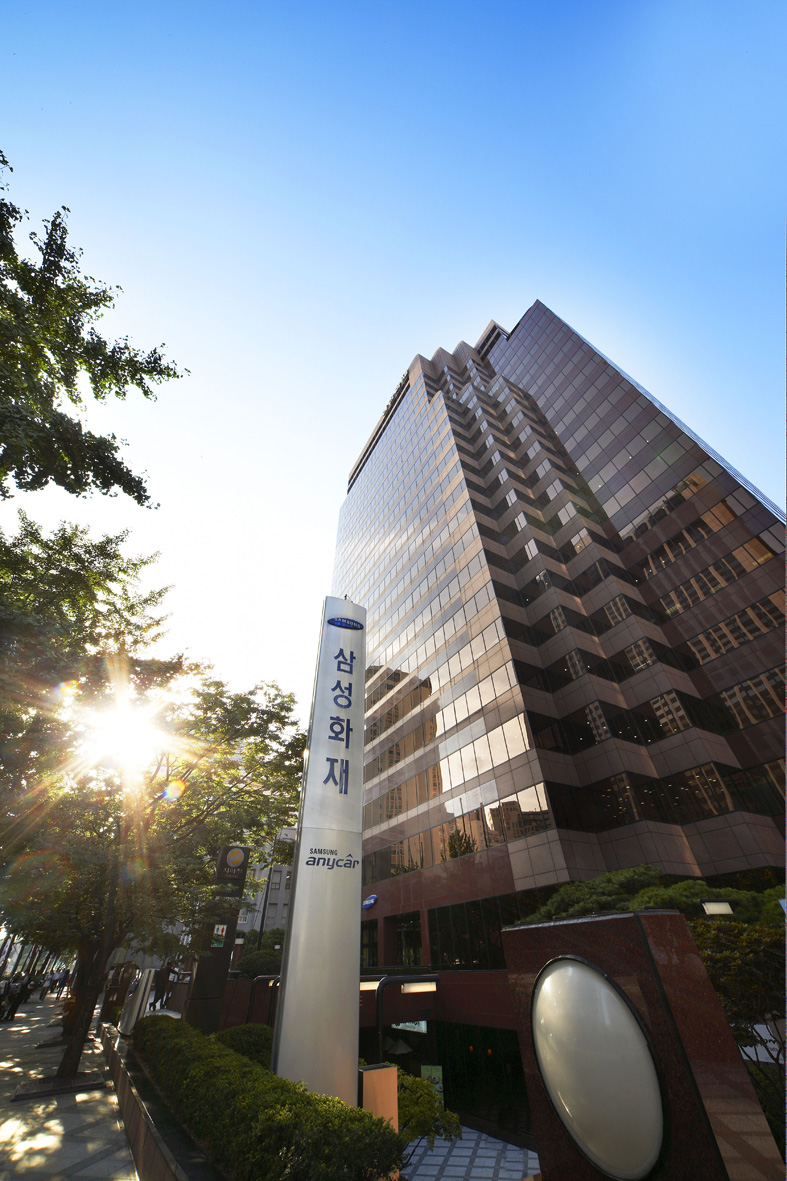
Former Samsung Fire & Marine Insurance Headquarters in Seoul, South Korea

=== Foundation (1950s - 1960s) ===
==== Creation of Anbo Fire Marine Reinsurance (January 1952) ====
Samsung Fire & Marine Insurance was incorporated on January 26, 1952, under the name, "Korea Anbo Fire Marine Reinsurance Co.," and was renamed Samsung Fire & Marine Insurance Co., Ltd., in December 1993.

Anbo Fire Marine Reinsurance originated from an education group called Hunsesa founded by Koo Jin-hyun. In the face of financial difficulties in managing Hunsesa since 1950 agrarian reform in Korea, Koo made a decision to establish an insurance company with capital of KRW 2 billion. He hed an inaugural meeting at his office at 32, Daechang-dong 2ga, Busan, and officially launched Korea Anbo Fire & Marine Reinsurance on January 26, 1952, which marked the foundation of Samsung Fire & Marine Insurance.

==== Foundation of Ankuk Fire & Marine Insurance (June 1956) ====
Ankuk Fire & Marine Insurance Co., Ltd. was founded in June 1956 by large shareholders of Josun Life Insurance, the first insurer in Korea. Considering adverse conditions of insurance business back then, Ankuk Fire & Marine Insurance appointed media mogul Jang Gi-young, who was the owner of the Hankuk Ilbo Daily and served as the Deputy Governor of the Bank of Korea. Ankuk fire & Marine Insurance was founded with capital worth KRW 100 million and had its headquarters in 60, Songhyun-dong, Jongno-gu, Seoul, and office in Ankuk-dong from which the name of the company originated.

==== Ankuk Fire & Marine Insurance, Acquired by Samsung (February 1958) ====
Ankuk Fire & Marine Insurance in late 1950s has been showing sluggish sales performance since its foundation and barely maintaining its business relying on subsequent premium income. Samsung, which emerged as a strong player in the Korean economy, had keen interests in developing the insurance business. Samsung was offered by large shareholders of Ankuk Fire & Marine Insurance to take over financially troubled Ankuk, and acquired the company in February 1958 accordingly.

==== Merge between Anbo and Ankuk into new Ankuk (March 1963) ====
The military regime which took power in Korea after the May 16 coup in 1961 pursued reform and development of the insurance industry as part of efforts to support economic growth. Additional move to induce capital increase allowed small insolvent non-life insurers to fail, and facilitated consolidation within the property and casualty insurance industry. Anbo, financially struggling to increase capital took over Ankuk in November 1962 after mulling over between M&A and sale of the company. The new company that merged Anbo and Ankuk in February 1963 started out under the name of Anbo. However, as consumers were more familiar with the name, Ankuk, it was renamed as Ankuk Fire & Marine Insurance in March 1963.

==== Long-term Insurance Development and Market Expansion (November 1969) ====
Ankuk Fire & Marine Insurance had conducted a survey on the Japanese market with a keen interest in long-term savings-type insurance sold by Japanese non-life insurers. As Daehan Fire & Marine Insurance and Dongbang Marine Insurance filed applications for long-term insurance sales, the government welcomed the move and gave its approval to non-life insurers. Since it got the green light for home general insurance sales in November 1969, Ankuk launched home insurance sales division and set up branches in March 1970, and expanded sales force. As a result, the company rose to the second largest player after Dongbang Marine Insurance.

=== Growth (1970s - 1980s) ===
==== IPO of Ankuk Fire & Marine Insurance (June 1975) ====
Ankuk Fire & Marine Insurance made an initial public offering (IPO) in June 1975 and made a turnaround to modernize its business. The IPO was the fourth of its kind in the property and casualty industry in Korea. The public offering complied with government platform for business reform to prevent monopolization through separation of capital from management and motivate public participation in corporate activities. After the IPO, Ankuk made a substantial improvement by putting priority on their shareholders.

==== Diversification of Motor Insurance Sales Channels (October 1983) ====
The Korean government identified structural problems in the motor insurance industry and announced the Motor Insurance Reformative Plan on March 25, 1983, in line with its policy platform for economic liberalization and market opening. The plan allowed ten non-life insurers to freely sell motor insurance products which had been sold exclusively by Hankuk Motor Insurance. Ankuk Fire & Marine Insurance secured wide claims service network and made inroads into the motor insurance market. Since then, the company surpassed Hankuk Motor Insurance to top the domestic motor insurance market in 1984.

==== Opening of Midnight Express Claims Adjustment Center and Customer Service Center (1989) ====
To reinforce its customer service, Ankuk launched the Customer Service Center in January 1989 and Midnight Express, the first night-time motor accident claims service in Korea, in November 1989. The Customer Service Center received motor accident reports and provided various services at the request of customers. Midnight Express dealt with night-time accidents across the country, and provided emergency road service for significant accidents within Seoul.

=== The Second Foundation (1990s) ===
==== New Management and Business Innovation (June 1993) ====
Samsung Group Chairman Lee Geon-hee declared the New Management on the occasion of the fifth anniversary of the Second Foundation of the Group on March 22, 1993, so as to shift its management focus from quantity to quality. In line with the spirit of the New Management, Ankuk restructured its management framework through massive investment in infrastructure, reform of system, and institutions, and management of various reform projects.

==== Renaming and Declaration of the Second Foundation (October 1993) ====
The company followed in the Group's footsteps to declare its second foundation on October 4, 1993. The second foundation was designed to transform the company into a top-tier global property and casualty insurer based on the principle of quality improvement. The company also changed its name to Samsung Fire & Marine Insurance in December to get closer to customers by using the renowned brand, Samsung.

==== Opening of Yuseong Training Campus ====
Samsung Fire & Marine Insurance bought Yuseong training campus from Hanil Group in May 1994. The training campus is fully furbished with education facilities, accommodations, and other amenities.

==== Establishment of Subsidiary in Indonesia ====
Samsung Fire & Marine Insurance participated in a joint venture investment with Tugu Insurance (which majority owned by Pertamina) to establish PT Asuransi Samsung Tugu in Indonesia in February 1997 for the first time in the Korean non-life insurance industry, as part of an effort to enter the Indonesian market and build a foothold in the Southeast Asian insurance market. Turning profits from the first year, the Indonesian subsidiary has been cited as a successful overseas investment.

=== Major Milestones ===
- Korea Anbo Fire & Marine Reinsurance Corporation was founded on January 26, 1952.
- Ankuk Fire & Marine Insurance was founded in June 1956.
- Samsung Group acquired Ankuk Fire & Marine Insurance in February 1958.
- Korea Anbo Fire & Marine Reinsurance merged with Ankuk Fire & Marine Insurance in December 1965.
- The merged company was named Ankuk Fire & Marine Insurance.
- The company established its first overseas office in London on May 25, 1975.
- The company went public on the Korea Stock Exchange on June 26, 1975.
- The company started sales of automobile insurance products in October 1983.
- Construction of Eulji-ro headquarters building was completed in October 1987.
- It opened Midnight Express, an around-the-clock claims service center, for the first time in the Korean non-life insurance industry, in November 1989.
- The company opened its New York Branch on April 1, 1990.
- The company changed its corporate name to Samsung Fire & Marine Insurance (SFMI) on December 6, 1993.
- SFMI opened its Tokyo office in January 1994.
- SFMI opened its Beijing office in April 1995.
- SFMI Blue Fangs Volley Ball Team was launched in November 1995.
- SFMI set up a local subsidiary in Indonesia in February 1997.
- SFMI Claims Service Company was established in October 1998.
- SFMI established Samsung Traffic Safety Research Institute on July 1, 2001.
- SFMI opened its Shanghai Branch in April 2001.
- SFMI launched its automobile insurance brand, "Anycar," on April 2, 2002.
- SFMI established an overseas subsidiary in Vietnam, Samsung Vina, in April 2003.
- SFMI opened its Qingdao office in September 2003.
- SFMI released a comprehensive package insurance, "Samsung Super Insurance" for the first time in Korea, on December 10, 2003.
- SFMI established its Chinese subsidiary as independent foreign legal entity on June 23, 2005.
- The Forbes Magazine put SFMI on the list of top 50 Asian Pacific companies in January 2007.
- SFMI launched its internet-based automobile insurance service in March 2009.
- SFMI opened its office in India in April 2009.
- SFMI opened an overseas subsidiary in Brazil in September 2009.
- SFMI opened fire station experience center within Kidzania Seoul in February 2010.
- SFMI opened a 24-hour center in November 2010.
- SFMI opened the Middle East office in Dubai in December 2010.
- SFMI opened its European subsidiary in March 2011.
- SFMI launched its US management subsidiary in June 2011.
- SFMI was rated A++, the highest rating, by the global credit rating agency A.M. Best in November 2011.
- SFMI won A+ rating from another leading credit rating agency, Standard & Poors, in December 2011.
- SFMI established its reinsurance company, "Samsung Re" in Singapore on January 20, 2012.
- SFMI won ISO 50001 energy management system certification for the first time in the domestic financial industry in May 2012.
- SFMI changed its name of online direct auto insurance from My Anycar to Anycar Direct in August 2012.
- SFMI was granted approval on auto liability insurance sales in China for the first time for a Korean property & casualty insurer on April 18, 2013.
- SFMI opened SFMI Global Campus and Auto Insurance R&D Center on December 19, 2014.
- SFMI marked the 63rd anniversary of its foundation in 2015.
- SFMI Blue Fangs Volley Ball Team was taken over by Cheil Worldwide in June 2015.
- SFMI achieved the top position for 18 consecutive years in Korea Consumer Satisfaction Index (KCSI), and 15 consecutive years in National Customer Satisfaction Index (NCSI) as of December 2015.

== Corporate social responsibility ==
=== Financial Support for Families of Auto Accident Victims ===
Since 1993, SFMI has provided support for bereaved families of car accident victims, especially young students who lost their families to automobile accidents, hence need financial support. In partnership with the Korea National Police Agency, SFMI provided "Big Love Scholarship" to children of car accident victims and traffic policemen who lost their lives in the line of duty.

=== SFMI Guide-dog School ===
As part of disabled support project, SFMI set up SFMI Guide-dog School in 1995 to raise and donate seeing-eye dogs for safe and independent travel of the visually challenged. SFMI Guide-dog School is the one and only such school established by a company, and it is a certified guide-dog school by the Ministry of Health and Welfare in Korea. Through two to three rounds of distribution every year, the school donated over 149 guide dogs pro bono to the visually challenged families by 2012.

=== TV Drama Production to Raise Awareness of Disabilities ===
In partnership with the Ministry of Education and Science Technology (MEST) and Disabled First Movement Headquarters, SFMI has produced and distributed a TV drama program on the disabled every year since October 2008 in an attempt to raise juvenile awareness of disabled people.

=== Camps and Concerts for Students with Disabilities ===
SFMI has held music talent camps and concerts for students with disabilities in association with the National Institute of Special Education, Disabled First Movement Headquarters, and Korea Nazarene University.

== Environment action ==
In terms of environment protection, SFMI adopted electronic general terms & conditions system in 2009, where it offers premium discounts to customers opting for eco-friendly electronic general terms and conditions (e-GTC), electronic policies, etc. By saving the discounted amount, SFMI raised a fund to create small school forests for employees' alma maters.

SFMI operates the Samsung Global Loss Control Center (GLCC) and Samsung Traffic Safety Research Institute to conduct research and studies associated with insurance risks and transportation. It also runs Samsung Transportation Museum in Yongin, Gyeonggi Province.

== Sponsorship ==
SFMI hosts World Baduk Masters Championship every year, an open Baduk (Go) competition for both professional and amateur Baduk players. The Championship began in 1996 in association with the Korea Broadcasting System (KBS) and the local Joong-Ang Daily.

== See also ==
- Samsung
- Daejeon Samsung Bluefangs
