= Samsung =

South Korean multinational conglomerate

Samsung Group
- Logo used since 2005

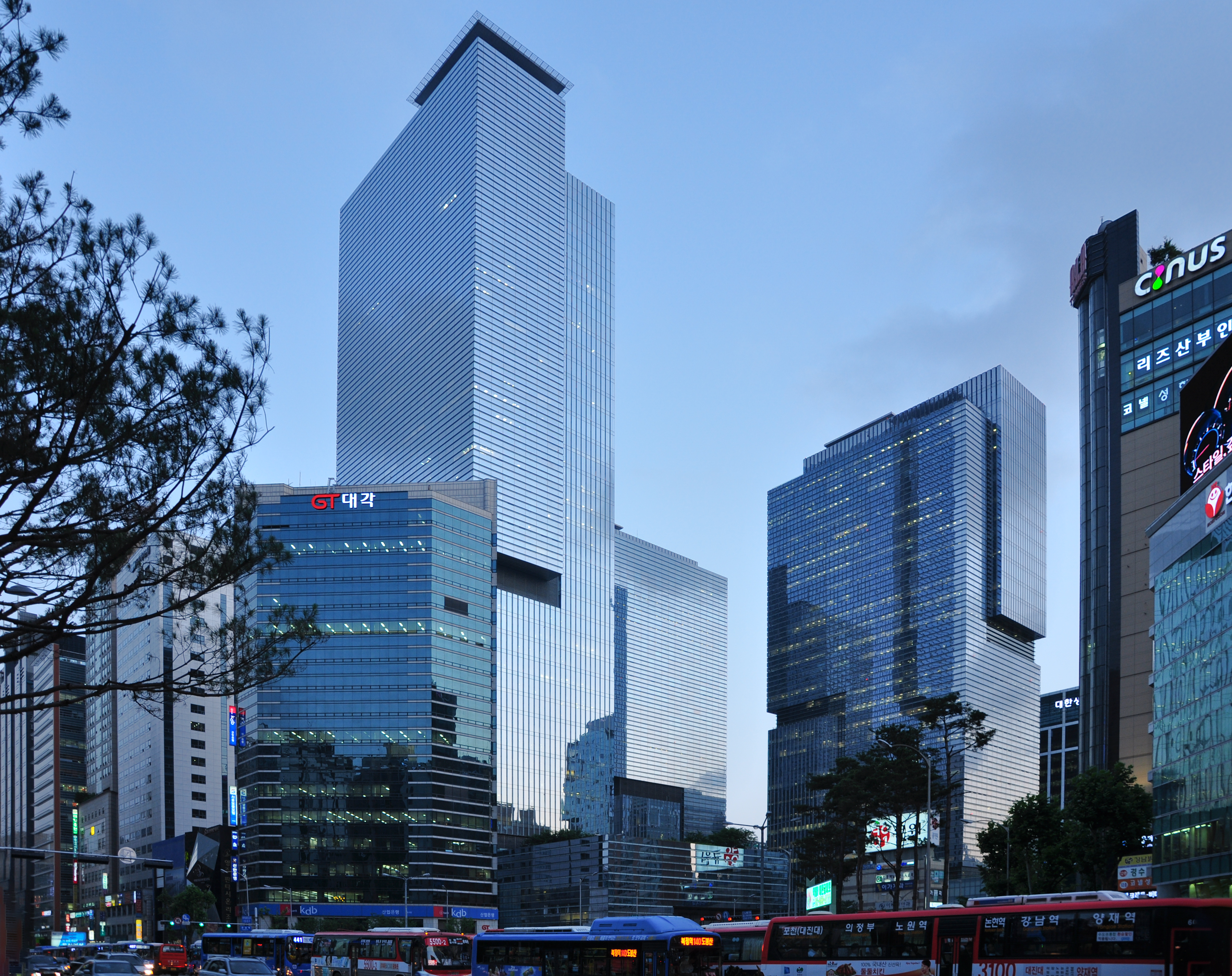
- Samsung Town, the company's headquarters, in Seoul
- Native name: 삼성그룹
- Type: Public
- Industry: Conglomerate
- Founded: 1 March 1938 (88 years ago) in Taikyu, Korea, Empire of Japan
- Founder: Lee Byung-chul
- Headquarters: Samsung Town, Seoul, South Korea
- Area served: Worldwide
- Key people: Lee Jae-yong (chairman)
- Number of employees: 262,647 (2024)
- Subsidiaries: Cheil Worldwide; Samsung Asset Management; Samsung Biologics; Samsung C&T Corporation; Samsung Electro-Mechanics; Samsung Electronics; Samsung E&A; Samsung Fire & Marine Insurance; Samsung Heavy Industries; Samsung Life Insurance; Samsung SDI; Samsung SDS; Samsung Securities

Korean name
- Hangul: 삼성
- Hanja: 三星
- RR: Samseong
- MR: Samsŏng
- Website: samsung.com

Samsung Group (Korean: 삼성; pronounced [sʰamsɔŋ]; stylised as SΛMSUNG) is a South Korean multinational manufacturing conglomerate headquartered in the Samsung Town office complex in Seoul. The group consists of numerous affiliated businesses, most of which operate under the Samsung brand, and is the largest chaebol (family-controlled conglomerates in South Korea). As of 2024, Samsung has the world's fifth-highest brand value.

Founded in 1938 by Lee Byung-chul as a trading company, Samsung diversified into various sectors, including food processing, textiles, insurance, securities, and retail, over the next three decades. In the late 1960s, Samsung entered the electronics industry, followed by the construction and shipbuilding sectors in the mid-1970s—areas that would fuel its future growth. After Lee died in 1987, Samsung was divided into five business groups: Samsung Group, Shinsegae Group, CJ Group, Hansol Group, and JoongAng Group.

Key affiliates of Samsung include Samsung Electronics, the world's largest information technology company, consumer electronics maker and chipmaker by 2017 revenues; Samsung Heavy Industries, the world's second-largest shipbuilder by 2010 revenues; and Samsung Engineering and Samsung C&T Corporation, ranked 13th and 36th among global construction companies, respectively. Other significant subsidiaries are Samsung Life Insurance, the 14th-largest life insurance company globally, and Cheil Worldwide, the world's 15th-largest advertising agency by 2012 revenues.

== Etymology ==
According to Samsung's founder, the meaning of the Korean hanja Samsung (三星) is three stars. The three stands for something big, numerous and powerful, while stars stands for everlasting or eternal.

== History ==
=== 1938–1980 ===
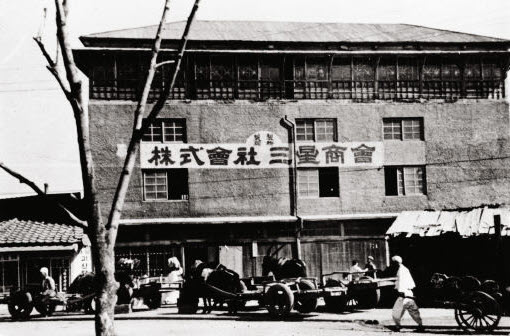
The headquarters of Sanghoes in Daegu in the late 1930s

In 1938, during the Japanese era, Lee Byung-chul (1910–1987), a member of a large landowning family in Ginei moved to nearby Taikyu and founded Mitsuboshi Trading Company (株式会社三星商会 (Kabushiki gaisha Mitsuboshi Shōkai)), or Samsung Sanghoe (주식회사 삼성상회). Samsung started out as a small trading company with forty employees located in Su-dong (now Ingyo-dong). It dealt in dried fish, locally-grown groceries and noodles. The company prospered and Lee moved its head office to Seoul in 1947. When the Korean War broke out, he was forced to leave Seoul. He started a sugar refinery in Pusan named Cheil Jedang. In 1954, Lee founded Cheil Mojik, a textiles company, and built the first plant in Chimsan-dong, Taegu. It was the largest woollen mill in the country at the time of construction.

Samsung diversified into various areas as Lee aimed to establish the company as a leader across multiple industries. The business expanded into sectors such as insurance, securities, and retail.

In 1947, Cho Hong-jai, the Hyosung group's founder, jointly invested in a new company called Samsung Mulsan Gongsa, or the Samsung Trading Corporation, with the Samsung's founder Lee Byung-chul. The trading firm grew to become the now Samsung C&T Corporation. After a few years, Cho and Lee separated due to differences in management style. Cho wanted a 30 equity share. Samsung Group was separated into Samsung Group and Hyosung Group, Hankook Tire and other businesses.

In the late 1960s, Samsung Group entered the electronics industry. It formed several electronics-related divisions, such as Samsung Electronics Devices, Samsung Electro-Mechanics, Samsung Corning and Samsung Semiconductor & Telecommunications, and opened the facility in Suwon. Its first product was a black-and-white television set. Byung-chul was also the owner of the Tongyang Broadcasting Company, a private radio and television company that existed from 1964 to 1980, shut down after the Korean government reviewed the number of media outlets allowed. TBC allowed an early success thanks to its connections to Samsung, boosting the sale of its television sets.

In 1972, the first television under the Samsung Electronics brand was released in South Korea.

=== 1980–2000 ===
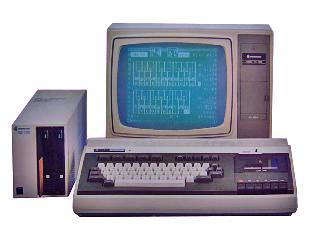
The SPC-1000, introduced in 1982, was Samsung's first personal computer (sold in the South Korean market only) and used an audio cassette tape to load and save data – the floppy drive was optional.

In 1980, Samsung acquired the Kumi-based Hanguk Jeonja Tongsin and entered telecommunications hardware. Its early products were switchboards. The facility was developed into the telephone and fax manufacturing systems and became the centre of Samsung's mobile phone manufacturing. The company grouped them together under Samsung Electronics in the 1980s.

After Lee, the founder's death in 1987, Samsung Group was separated into five business groups – Samsung Group, Shinsegae Group, CJ Group, Hansol Group and the JoongAng Group. Shinsegae (discount store, department store) was originally part of Samsung Group, separated in the 1990s from the Samsung Group along with CJ Group (Food/Chemicals/Entertainment/logistics), Hansol Group (Paper/Telecom), and the JoongAng Group (Media). Today these separated groups are independent and they are not part of or connected to the Samsung Group. One Hansol Group representative said, "Only people ignorant of the laws governing the business world could believe something so absurd", adding, "When Hansol separated from the Samsung Group in 1991, it severed all payment guarantees and share-holding ties with Samsung affiliates." One Hansol Group source asserted, "Hansol, Shinsegae, and CJ have been under independent management since their respective separations from the Samsung Group". One Shinsegae department store executive director said, "Shinsegae has no payment guarantees associated with the Samsung Group".

In the 1980s, Samsung Electronics began to invest heavily in research and development, investments that were pivotal in pushing the company to the forefront of the global electronics industry. In 1982, it built a television assembly plant in Portugal; in 1984, a plant in New York; in 1985, a plant in Tokyo; in 1987, a facility in England; and another facility in Austin, Texas, in 1996.

In 1987, United States International Trade Commission found that the Samsung Group of South Korea unlawfully sold computer chips in the United States without licenses from the chip inventor, Texas Instruments Inc.

Since 1990, Samsung has increasingly globalised its activities and electronics; in particular, its mobile phones and semiconductors have become its most important source of income. It was in this period that Samsung started to rise as an international corporation in the 1990s. Samsung's construction branch was awarded contracts to build one of the two Petronas Towers in Malaysia, Taipei 101 in Taiwan and the Burj Khalifa in United Arab Emirates. Samsung became the world's largest producer of memory chips in 1992 and is the world's second-largest chipmaker after Intel (see Worldwide Top 20 Semiconductor Market Share Ranking Year by Year).

In 1993, Lee Kun-hee consolidated the group around electronics, engineering and chemicals by selling, downsizing, and merging operations. In 1995, Samsung's textile department invested in FUBU, an American hip hop apparel company, after the founder placed an advertisement asking for funding in The New York Times. The same year, it created its first liquid-crystal display screen. Samsung grew to be the world's largest manufacturer of liquid-crystal display panels. In 1996, the Samsung Group reacquired the Sungkyunkwan University foundation.

Compared to other major Korean companies, Samsung survived the 1997 Asian financial crisis relatively unharmed. However, Samsung Motor was sold to Renault at a significant loss. As of 2010, Renault Samsung is 80.1 per cent owned by Renault and 19.9 per cent owned by Samsung. Additionally, Samsung manufactured a range of aircraft from the 1980s to the 1990s. The company was founded in 1999 as Korea Aerospace Industries (KAI), the result of a merger between then three domestic major aerospace divisions of Samsung Aerospace, Daewoo Heavy Industries and Hyundai Space and Aircraft Company. However, Samsung still manufactures aircraft engines and gas turbines.

=== 2000–present ===
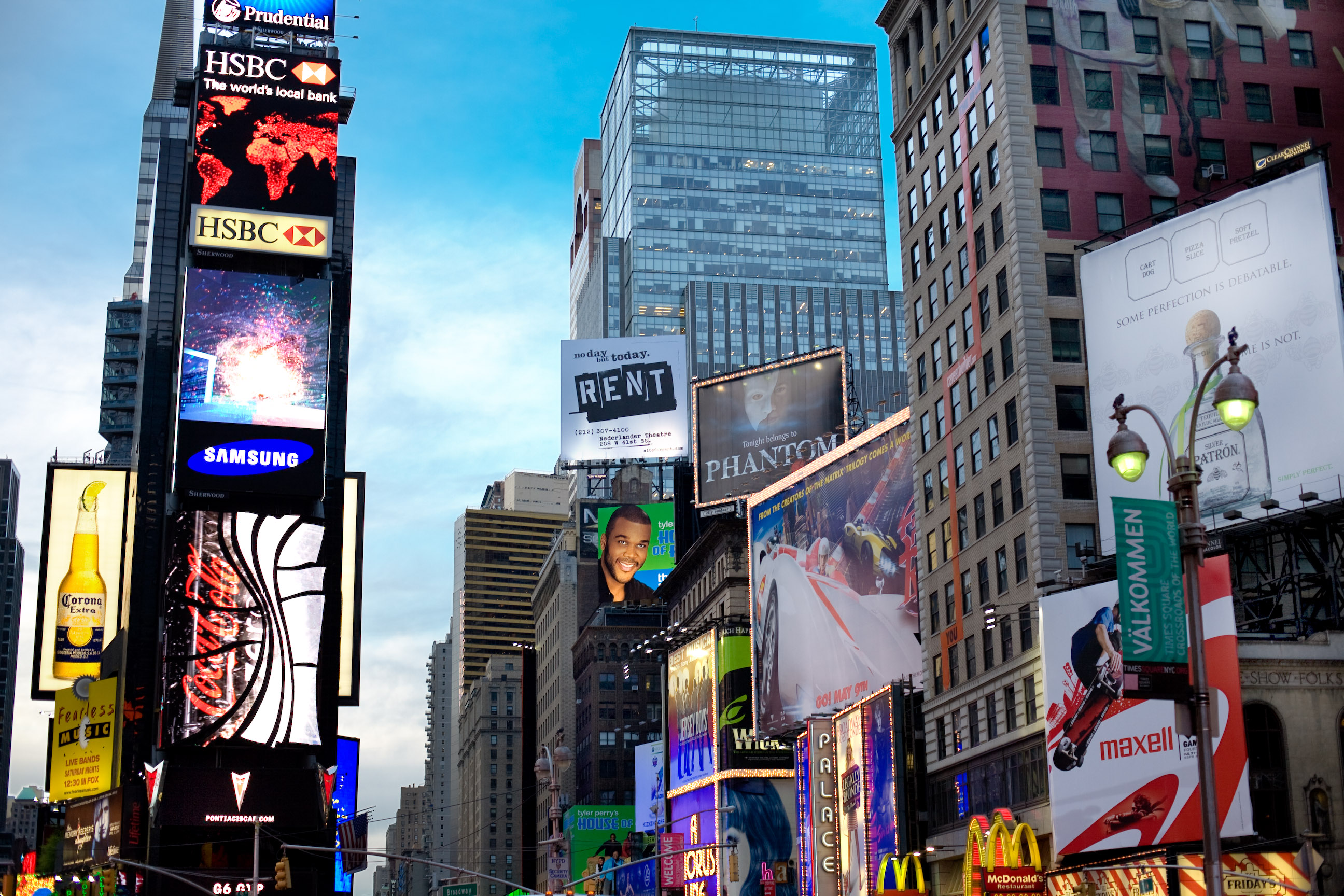
The prominent Samsung sign in Times Square, New York City

In 2000, Samsung R&D opened a development centre in Warsaw, Poland. Its work began with set-top-box technology before moving into digital TV and smartphones. The smartphone platform was developed with partners, officially launched with the original Samsung Solstice line of devices and other derivatives in 2008, which was later developed into Samsung Galaxy line of devices including Notes, Edge and other products.

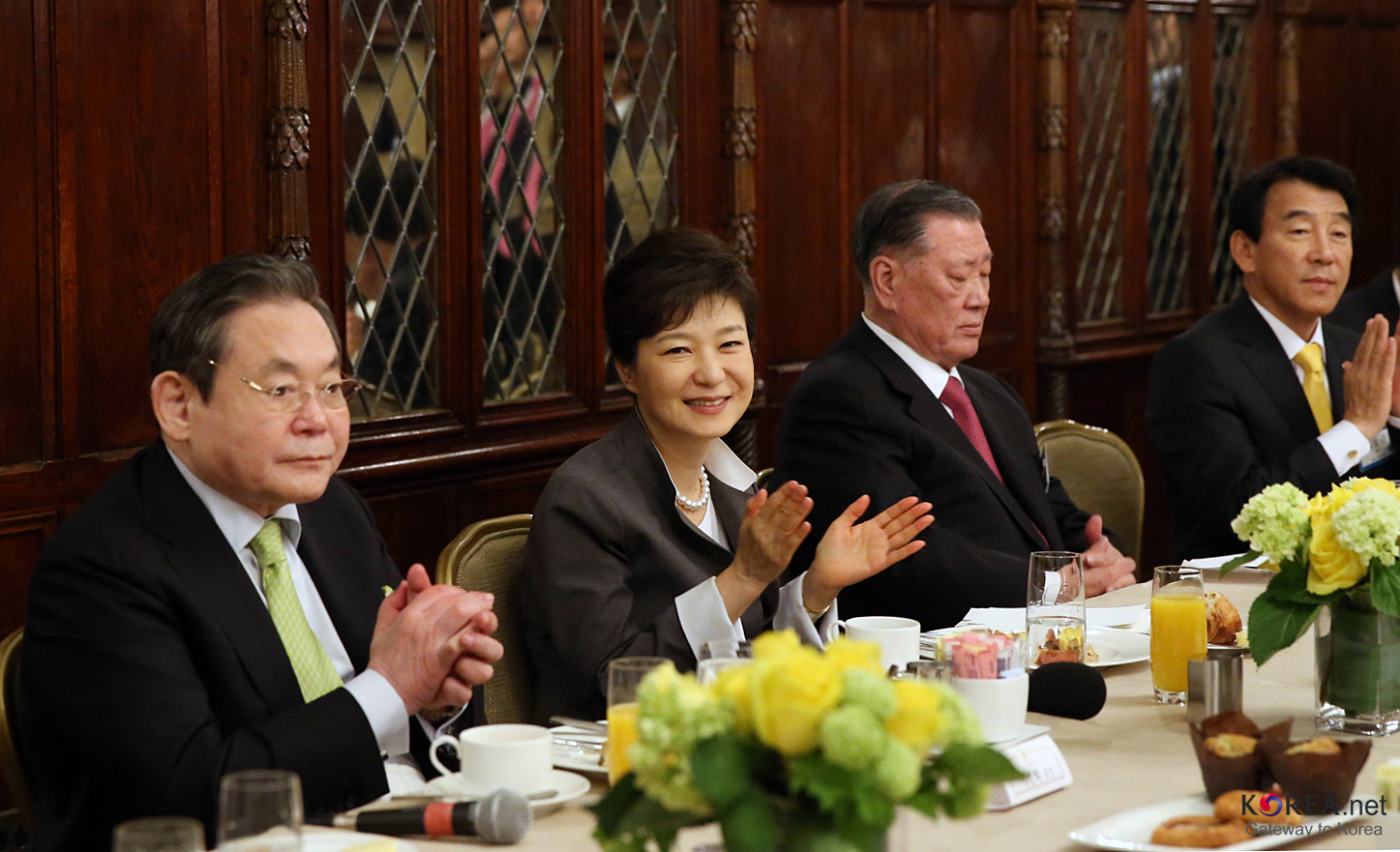
The Samsung Group's chairman, Lee Kun-hee (left), with South Korean President Park Geun-hye, 2013

In 2007, former Samsung chief lawyer Kim Yong Chul claimed that he was involved in bribing and fabricating evidence on behalf of the group's chairman, Lee Kun-hee, and the company. Kim said that Samsung lawyers trained uninvolved executives to serve as fabricated scapegoats to protect Lee. Kim also told the media that he was "sidelined" by Samsung after he refused to pay a $3.3 million bribe to the U.S. Federal District Court judge presiding over a case where two of its executives were found guilty on charges related to memory chip price-fixing. Kim revealed that the company had raised a large number of secret funds through bank accounts illegally opened under the names of up to 1,000 Samsung executives – under his own name, four accounts were opened to manage 5 billion won.

Sony, which had not invested in large-size TFT-LCDs, contacted Samsung to cooperate, and, in 2006, S-LCD was established as a joint venture between Samsung and Sony in order to provide a stable supply of LCD panels for both manufacturers. S-LCD was owned by Samsung (50% plus one share) and Sony (50% minus one share) and operates its factories and facilities in Tanjung, South Korea. As of 26 December 2011, it was announced that Samsung had acquired the stake of Sony in this joint venture.

In 2010, Samsung announced a ten-year growth strategy centered around five businesses. One of these businesses was to be focused on biopharmaceuticals, to which has committed ₩2.1 trillion. In first quarter of 2012, Samsung Electronics became the world's largest mobile phone maker by unit sales, overtaking Nokia, which had been the market leader since 1998.

On 24 August 2012, nine American jurors ruled that Samsung Electronics had to pay Apple $1.05 billion in damages for violating six of its patents on smartphone technology. The award was still less than the $2.5 billion requested by Apple. The decision also ruled that Apple did not violate five Samsung patents cited in the case. Samsung decried the decision saying that the move could harm innovation in the sector. It also followed a South Korean ruling stating that both companies were guilty of infringing on each other's intellectual property. In first trading after the ruling, Samsung shares on the KOSPI fell 7.7%, the largest fall since 24 October 2008, to 1,177,000 South Korean won. Apple then sought to ban the sales of eight Samsung phones (Galaxy S 4G, Galaxy S2 AT&T, Galaxy S2 Skyrocket, Galaxy S2 T-Mobile, Galaxy S2 Epic 4G, Galaxy S Showcase, Droid Charge and Galaxy Prevail) in the United States, but this was denied by the court.

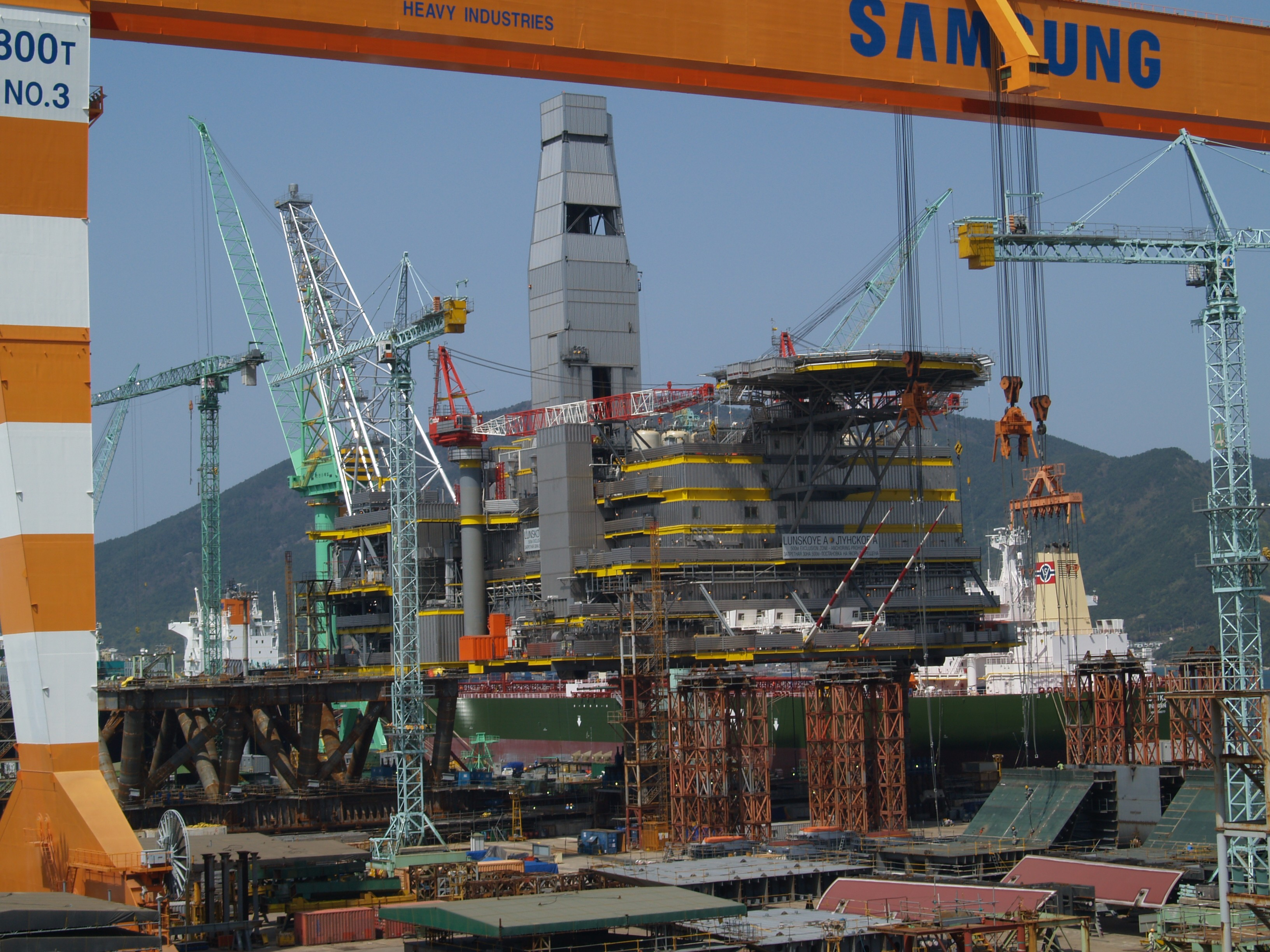
One of the world's largest oil and gas projects, Sakhalin-II- Lunskoye platform under construction. The topside facilities of the LUN-A (Lunskoye) and PA-B (Piltun Astokhskoye) platforms were built at the Samsung Heavy Industries' shipyard in South Korea.

In October 2012, work began on the world's first floating liquefied natural gas (FLNG) platform at Samsung Heavy Industries' shipyard on Geoje Island. It was projected to become the world's biggest "ship" when finished and fully loaded.

As of 2013, the Fair Trade Commission of Taiwan is investigating Samsung and its local Taiwanese advertising agency for false advertising. The case was commenced after the commission received complaints stating that the agency hired students to attack competitors of Samsung Electronics in online forums. Samsung Taiwan made an announcement on its Facebook page in which it stated that it had not interfered with any evaluation report and had stopped online marketing campaigns that constituted posting or responding to content in online forums.

In 2015, Samsung has been granted more U.S. patents than any other company. The company received 7,679 utility patents through 11 December.

The Galaxy Note 7 smartphone went on sale on 19 August 2016. However, in early September 2016, Samsung suspended sales of the phone and announced an informal recall. This action was taken after some units of the phones were found to have batteries with a defect that caused them to generate excessive heat, leading to fires and explosions. Samsung replaced the recalled units of the phones with a new version. However, it was later discovered that the new version of the Galaxy Note 7 also had the battery defect. Consequently, Samsung recalled all Galaxy Note 7 smartphones worldwide on 10 October 2016 and permanently ceased production of the phone the following day.

In 2018, it inaugurated the world's largest mobile manufacturing facility in Noida, India, in the presence of Indian Prime Minister Narendra Modi and South Korean President Moon Jae-in.

In 2023, Samsung announced its decision to reduce the production of memory chips. This action is on account of the company's projected 96% decline in quarterly operating profit - a 600 million won decline from the 14 trillion won in 2022. The said drop can be attributed to the weak demand after COVID and a slowing global economy. Despite this decision, the company's shares increased by more than 4%. Samsung has been the top two applicant for PCT filled patents in 2022 and 2023 worldwide.

Following the grant to Samsung of U.S. Patent No. 9,675,229 and its European counterpart, EP 2963515, titled Cleaning robot and method for controlling the same, the patents were challenged by Igor Paromtchik through an ex parte reexamination in the United States and opposition proceedings in Europe. These patents described technologies used in Samsung's POWERbot robot vacuum cleaners. The European patent was revoked in March 2024. The U.S. patent ceased to be in force in June 2025 due to non-payment of maintenance fees, approximately ten years before the end of its full statutory term.

On 12 February 2026, Samsung "started shipping its most advanced HBM4 chips."

In May 2026, Samsung hit $1 Trillion in valuation, after its shares more than quadrupled over the past year on booming demand for the chips used in artificial intelligence.

== Influence in South Korea ==
Samsung has a powerful influence on South Korea's economic development, politics, media and culture and has been a major driving force behind the "Miracle on the Han River". Its affiliate companies produce around a fifth of South Korea's total exports. Samsung's revenue was equal to 22.4% of South Korea's $1.67 trillion GDP in 2022.

"You can even say the Samsung chairman is more powerful than the President of South Korea. [South] Korean people have come to think of Samsung as invincible and above the law", said Woo Suk-hoon, host of a popular economics podcast in a Washington Post article headlined "In South Korea, the Republic of Samsung", published on 9 December 2012. Critics claimed that Samsung knocked out smaller businesses, limiting choices for South Korean consumers and sometimes colluded with fellow giants to fix prices while bullying those who investigate. Lee Jung-hee, a South Korean presidential candidate, said in a debate, "Samsung has the government in its hands. Samsung manages the legal world, the press, the academics and bureaucracy".

== Operations ==
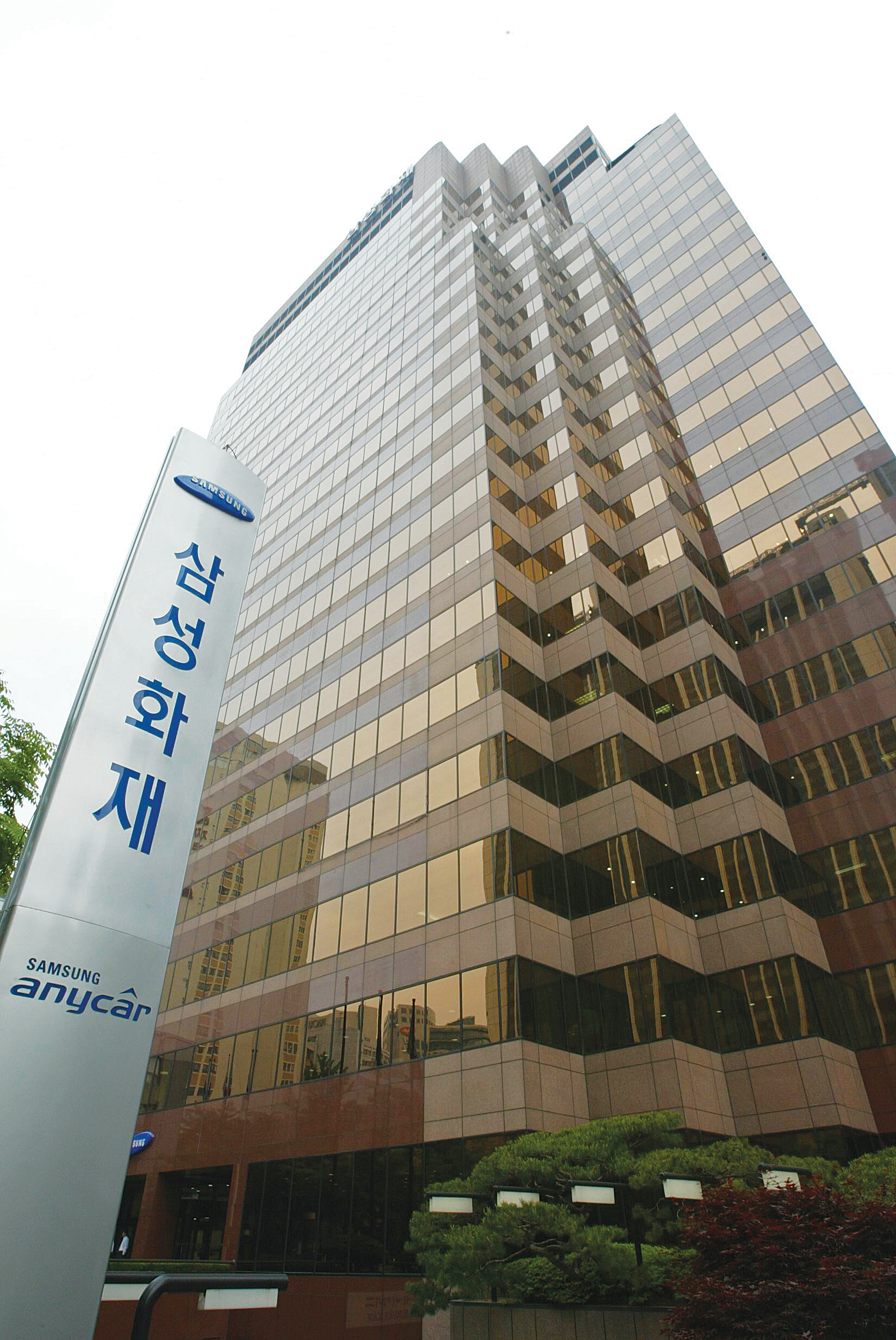
Samsung Fire & Marine Insurance HQ

Samsung comprises around 80 companies. Its activities include construction, consumer electronics, financial services, shipbuilding, and medical services, and two research and development stations that have allowed the chaebol to enter the industries of "high-polymer chemicals, genetic engineering tools [and biotech as a whole], aerospace, and nanotechnology."

As of April 2011, the Samsung Group comprised 59 unlisted companies and 19 listed companies, all of which had their primary listing on the Korea Exchange.

In FY 2009, Samsung reported consolidated revenues of 220 trillion KRW ($172.5 billion). In FY 2010, Samsung reported consolidated revenues of 280 trillion KRW ($258 billion), and profits of 30 trillion KRW ($27.6 billion) based upon a KRW-USD exchange rate of 1,084.5 KRW per USD, the spot rate as of 19 August 2011. These amounts do not include the revenues from Samsung's subsidiaries based outside South Korea.

In 2024, the World Intellectual Property Organization (WIPO)'s Hague Yearly Review ranked Samsung's number of industrial design applications filled under the Hague System as 1st in the world, with 544 industrial design applications submitted during 2023.

=== Leadership ===
1. Lee Byung-chul (1938–1966, 1968–1987)
2. Lee Maeng-hee (1966–1968), Lee Byung-chul's first son
3. Lee Kun-hee (1987–2008, 2010–2020), Lee Byung-chul's third son
4. Lee Soo-bin (2008–2010)

=== Affiliates ===
Name	Businesses	Founding Year	Headquarters Location	KRX Number	Previous Names	Ref.
Samsung Electronics	air conditioners, computers, digital television sets, active-matrix organic light-emitting diodes (AMOLEDs), mobile phones, display monitors, computer printers, refrigerators, semiconductors, telecommunications networking equipment	1969	Suwon	005930		
Samsung Biologics	contract development and manufacturing	2011	Incheon	207940		
Samsung E&A	construction of oil refining plants; upstream oil and gas facilities; petrochemical plants and gas plants; steel making plants; power plants; water treatment facilities	1969	Seoul	02803450		
Samsung Fire & Marine Insurance	accident insurance, automobile insurance, casualty insurance, fire insurance, liability insurance, marine insurance, personal pensions, loans	1952	Seoul	000810	Korea Anbo Fire and Marine Insurance	
Samsung Heavy Industries	bulk carriers, container vessels, crude oil tankers, cruisers, passenger ferries, material handling equipment steel, bridge structures.	1974	Seoul	010140		
Samsung Life Insurance	individual life insurance, annuity products and services	1957	Seoul	032830	Dongbang Life Insurance	
Samsung SDI	electric vehicle lithium-ion batteries, phone and portable computer batteries	1970		006400		
Samsung SDS	IT services, logistics services for enterprises	1985		018260		
Samsung Electro-Mechanics	electronic components	1973	Suwon	009150		
Samsung Advanced Institute of Technology (SAIT)	research labs	1987				
Samsung Card	credit card	1983	Seoul	029780		
Samsung C&T Corporation	environment & asset, food culture and resort	1938	Seoul	000830	Samsung Sanghoe, Samsung Corporation, Samsung Construction	
Samsung Medical Center	hospital, cancer center	1994				
Cheil Worldwide	advertising, public relations, etc.	1973	Seoul	030000		
IMarketKorea	procurement services and business-to-business goods	2000	Seoul	122900		
Hotel Shilla	hospitality, travel retail	1979		008770		
Samsung Securities	asset management, corporate banking, capital management	1982	Seoul	016360	International Securities	
S-1 CORPORATION	security	1977	Seoul	012750		

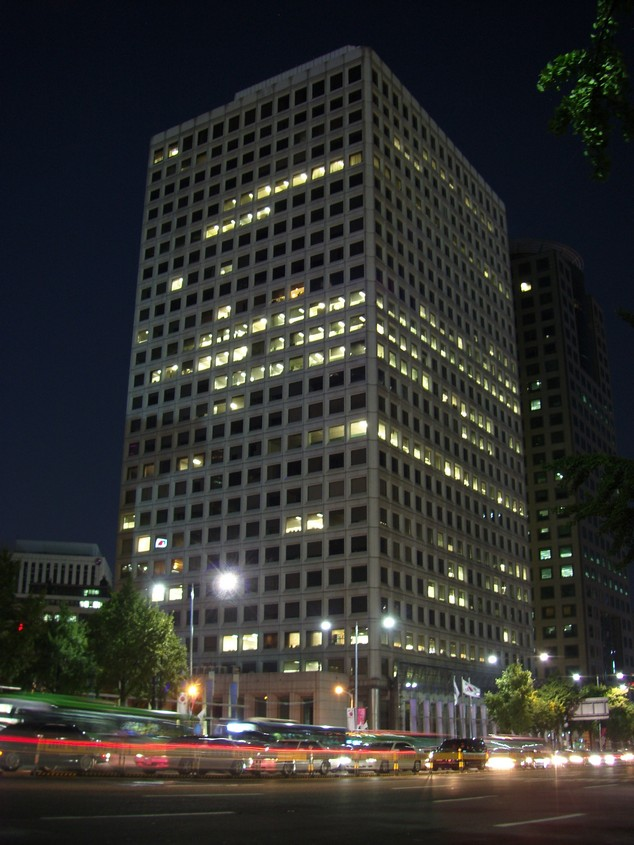
Samsung Taepyeong-ro HQ in Jung District, Seoul

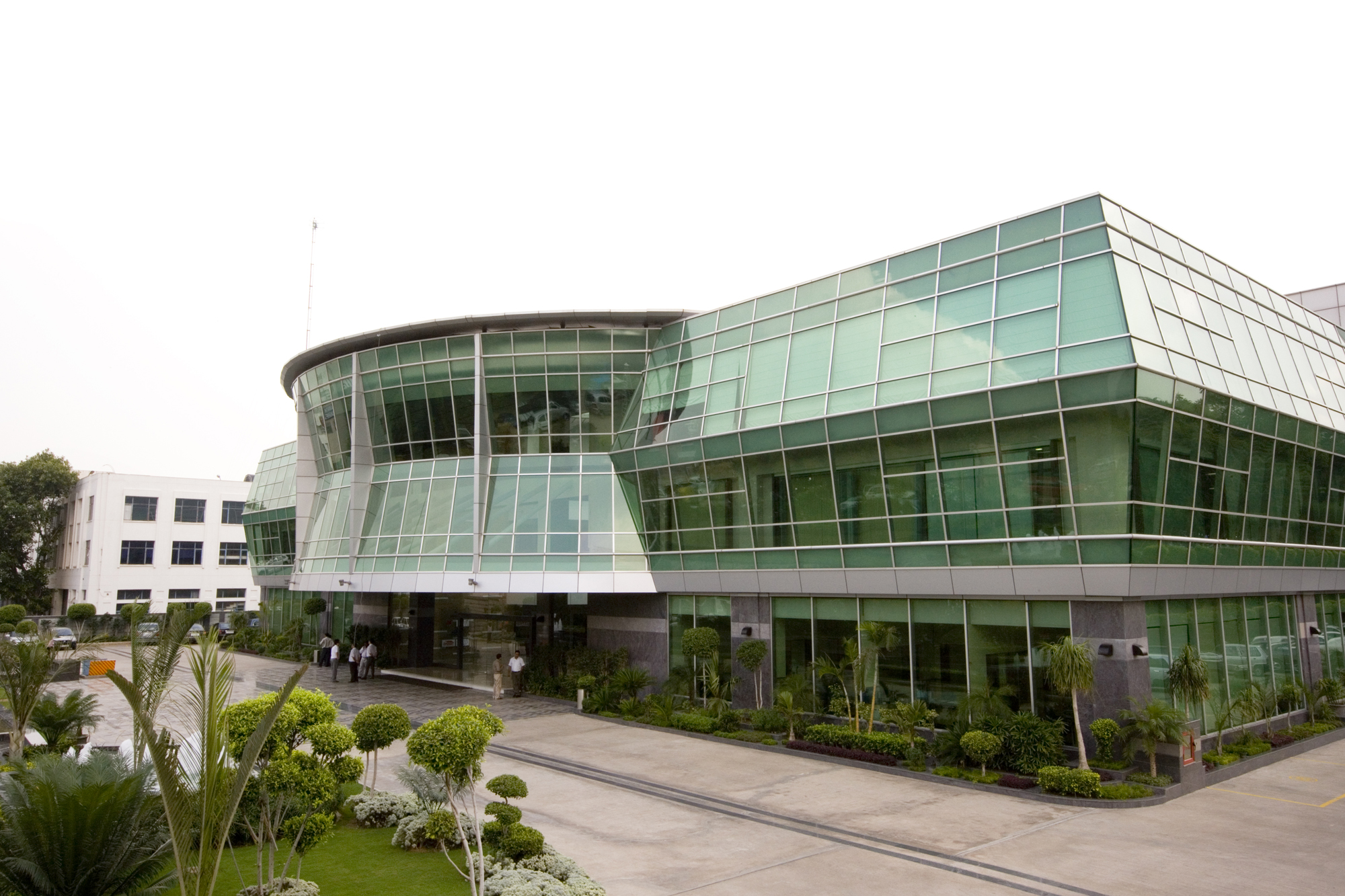
Samsung Engineering India Office in New Delhi, India

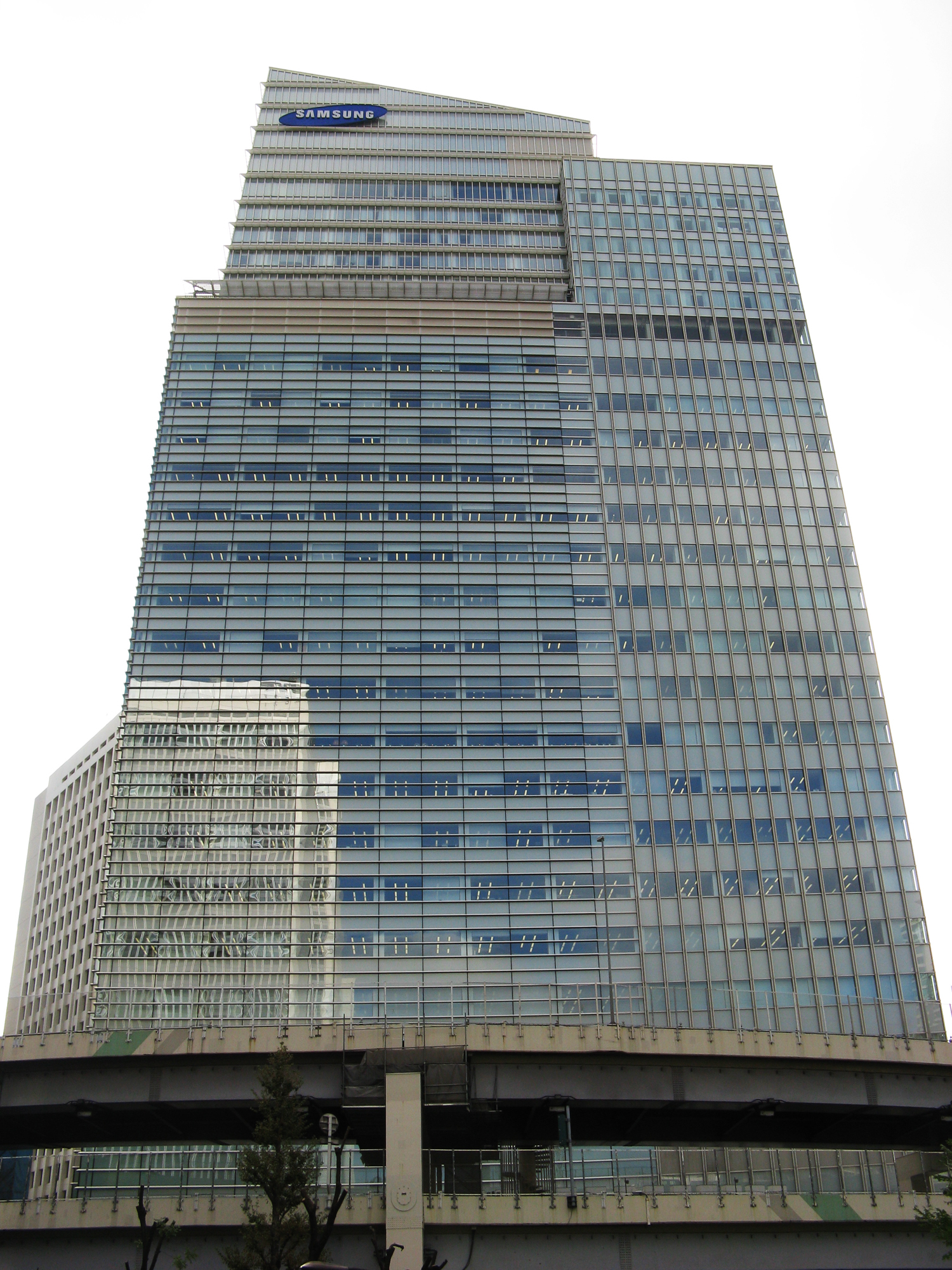
Samsung Japan's regional HQ at Roppongi, Minato, Tokyo, Japan

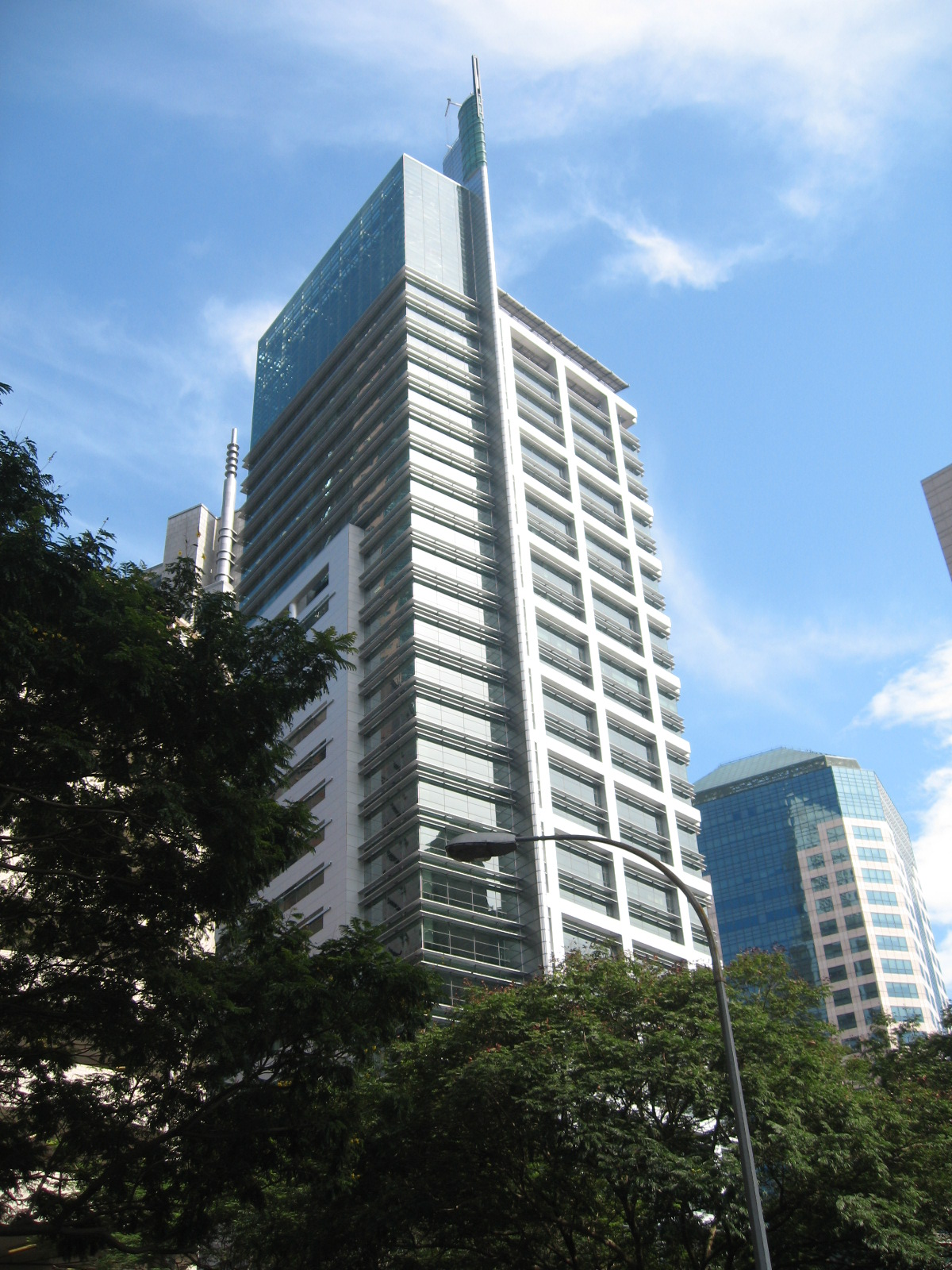
The Samsung Hub, formerly 3 Church Street, is a skyscraper located in the Downtown Core of Singapore.

=== Joint Ventures ===
	Joint Venture Name	Business	Partner Firm Countries	Date Formed	Date Dissolved	Ref.	Samsung Subsidiary	Partner Firms	Samsung Share (%)
1	Alpha Processor Inc. (API)	Microprocessor	(United States)	1998	(Defunct)			Compaq	
2	GE Samsung Lighting	Lighting	(United States)	1998	2009			General Electric	
3	Global Steel Exchange	Steel	(United States) (Switzerland) (Luxembourg)	2000	(Defunct)			Cargill, Duferco, Tradearbed	
4	S-LCD Corporation	Liquid-crystal display	(Japan)	April 2004	December 26, 2011		Samsung Electronics	Sony	50 (plus one share)
5	aT Grain Co.	Grain	(South Korea)				Samsung C&T Corporation	Korea Agro-Fisheries, Hanjin Transportation Co., STX Corporation	15
6	Brooks Automation Asia Co., Ltd.	Manufacturing	(United States)	1999			Samsung Electronics	Brooks Automation	30
7	POSS – SLPC s.r.o.		(South Korea)	2007			Samsung C&T Corporation, Samsung C&T Deutschland	POSCO	
8	Samsung BP Chemicals	Chemical industry	(United Kingdom)	1989				BP	49
9	Samsung Corning Precision Materials, Co., Ltd. (SCP)	Cathode ray tube Glass, LCD Glass Substrate	(United States)	1973	January 15, 2014		Samsung Display	Corning Inc.	
10	Samsung Sumitomo LED Materials	LED Sapphire Substrates	(Japan)				Samsung LED CO., Ltd.	Sumitomo Chemical	
11	SD Flex Co., Ltd.	Double-Layer FCCL	(United States)	October 2004				DuPont	
12	Sermatech Korea	Aircraft Construction	(United States)				Samsung Aerospace	Sermatech International	49
13	Siltronic Samsung Wafer Pte. Ltd	Wafer (electronics)	(Germany)	June 2008			Samsung Electronics	Siltronic	
14	SMP Ltd.	Polysilicon	(United States)	2011			Samsung Fine Chemicals	MEMC Electronic Materials Inc.	
15	Stemco	FPD Circuit Substrate	(Japan)	1995			Samsung Electro-Mechanics	Toray Industries	
16	SB LiMotive	Lithium-ion battery (Vehicles)	(Germany)	June 2008	October 2012		Samsung SDI	Bosch (company)	50
17	Toshiba Samsung Storage Technology	Optical disc drive	(Japan)	2004	2016		Samsung Electronics	Toshiba	49
18	Samsung Bioepis	biosimilar medicine	(United States)	2012			Samsung Biologics	Biogen	50 (plus one share)
19	Samsung Air China Life Insurance	insurance	(China)	July 2005			Samsung Life Insurance	China National Aviation Holding	50
20	Siam Samsung Life Insurance	insurance	(Thailand)				Samsung Life Insurance	Saha Group, Thanachart Bank	37
21	Shanghai Welstory Food	food distribution	(Japan) (China)	June 2016			Samsung Welstory	Kokubu, Yinlong Agriculture Development	70

=== Stakes ===
	Company	Business	Country	Stake (%)	Ref.	Derived products	Acquired by
1	Atlântico Sul	Shipbuilding	Brazil	10		Joao Candido	Samsung Heavy Industries
2	Canopius Group	Insurance	United Kingdom	40			Samsung Fire & Marine Insurance
3	Corning Inc.	Glass	United States	7.4		Gorilla Glass	Samsung Display
4	DGB Financial Group	Banking	South Korea	7.4			Samsung Life Insurance
5	Doosan Engine	Construction	South Korea	14.1			Samsung Heavy Industries
6	Dowoo Insys	Ultrathin glass substrate	South Korea	27.7			Samsung Display
7	Emro	Supply chain management	South Korea	33.4			Samsung SDS
8	Pantech	Mobile phone	South Korea	10			Samsung Electronics
9	Rambus	Chip Interface	United States	4.19			Samsung Electronics
10	Renault Korea	Automotive	South Korea	13.13			Samsung Card
11	Seagate Technology	Data storage	United States	9.6			Samsung Electronics
12	Sungjin Geotec	Offshore drilling	South Korea	10			Samsung Engineering
13	Taylor Energy	Oil	United States	20			Samsung Oil & Gas USA Corp.

=== Divested ===
	Target Company	Business	Country	Date Sold	Ref.	Pre-Sale Owners	Acquirer(s)
1	Rollei	Optical instrument	(Germany)	1999		Samsung Techwin	Rollei Management
2	Samsung Techwin	Closed-circuit television	(South Korea)	June 2015		Samsung	Hanwha Group
3	Samsung Thales Co., Ltd.	business	(South Korea) (France)	June 2015		Samsung Techwin, Thales Group	Hanwha Group
4	Samsung General Chemicals	Chemical industry	(South Korea)			Samsung	Hanwha Group
5	Hanhwa Total	Chemical industry	(South Korea) (France)	June 2015		Samsung General Chemicals, Total Petrochemicals	Hanwha Group
6	Sharp Corporation	Electronics industry	(Japan)	2016			Foxconn

=== Defunct ===
- Alpha Processor Inc. (API) was established in 1998 as a joint venture with U.S.-based Compaq, to enter the high-end microprocessor market. The venture was also aimed at expanding Samsung's non-memory chip business by manufacturing DEC Alpha CPUs. At the time, Samsung and Compaq invested $500 million in Alpha Processor.
- GE Samsung Lighting was a joint venture between Samsung and the GE Lighting subsidiary of General Electric. The venture was established in 1998 and was broken up in 2009.
Logo of Samtron
- Samtron was a subsidiary of Samsung until 1999 when it became independent. After that, it continued to make computer monitors and plasma displays until 2003, Samtron became Samsung when Samtron was a brand. In 2003 the website redirected to Samsung.
- S-LCD Corporation was a joint venture between Samsung Electronics (50% plus one share) and the Japan-based Sony Corporation (50% minus one share) established in April 2004. On 26 December 2011, Samsung Electronics announced that it would acquire all of Sony's shares in the venture.
- Global Steel Exchange was a joint venture formed in 2000 between Samsung, the U.S.-based Cargill, the Switzerland-based Duferco Group, and the Luxembourg-based Tradearbed (now part of the ArcelorMittal), to handle their online buying and selling of steel.

=== International operations ===
==== Canada ====
The government of the Canadian province of Ontario signed one of the world's largest renewable energy projects, a deal worth $6.6 billion for an additional 2,500 MW of new wind and solar energy. Under the agreement, a consortium led by Samsung and the Korea Electric Power Corporation manages the development of 2,000 MW-worth of new wind farms and 500 MW of solar capacity, while also building a manufacturing supply chain in the province.

==== United Arab Emirates ====
In 2009, a consortium of South Korean firms, including Samsung, Korea Electric Power Corporation and Hyundai, won a deal worth $40 billion to build nuclear power plants in the United Arab Emirates.

==== Vietnam ====
In March 2008, Samsung received an investment certificate and began construction of its first mobile phone manufacturing plant in Vietnam, Samsung Electronics Vietnam (SEV) in Bac Ninh. The project originally had an investment capital of US$670 million, but it was quickly increased to US$1.5 billion, then to US$2.5 billion, nearly four times the original investment capital.

In the period from 2018 to 2022, Samsung contributed over US$306 billion in export revenue to Vietnam. In 2022 alone, despite the impact of the COVID-19 pandemic, the figure reached US$65 billion, contributing significantly to Vietnam's total export value, which for the first time exceeded the US$700 billion threshold, reaching over US$732 billion.

In addition, Samsung has also brought Vietnamese businesses deeper into the global value chain and contributed significantly to the development of the electronics industry in Vietnam. Currently, the number of Vietnamese first- and second-tier suppliers in Samsung's global supply chain has increased tenfold, from 25 businesses in 2014 to 257 businesses by the end of 2022.

== Acquisitions and attempted acquisitions ==
Samsung formed Samsung Strategy and Innovation Center (SSIC) in 2012 and Samsung NEXT in 2013 for incubation, investment, partnerships, and acquisitions. In 2017, Samsung NEXT created a US$150 million fund for early-stage software and services startups. Samsung Catalyst Fund, SSIC's investment arm, has funded 15-20 startups per year. SSIC primarily focuses on internet of things, cloud and computer data storage, smart machines, smart health, and privacy and security. In 2025, Samsung Electronics launched a business support division with a dedicated mergers and acquisitions team. Samsung's distribution of overseas cash reserves were reportedly a limiting factor for larger acquisitions.

	Date	Company	Business	Country	Value (USD)	Ref.	Derived products	Acquired by
1	December 2010	MEDISON Co.	Medical Equipment	South Korea	—		Diagnostic Ultrasound Systems	Samsung Electronics
2	July 2011	Grandis, Inc.	Spin-Transfer Torque Random Access Memory (MRAM)	United States	—		—	Samsung Electronics
3	December 2011	S-LCD Corporation	Liquid-crystal display (LCD)	South Korea	939,000,000		—	Samsung Electronics
4	May 2012	mSpot	Music Service	United States	—		Samsung Music Hub	Samsung Electronics
5	December 2012	NVELO, Inc.	Software	United States	—		—	Samsung Electronics
6	January 2013	NeuroLogica	Medical imaging	United States	—		—	Samsung Electronics
7	August 2014	SmartThings	Home Automation	United States	—			Samsung Electronics
8	August 2014	Quietside LLC	Smart Home	United States	—		—	Samsung Electronics
9	November 2014	Proximal Data	Server-Side Caching Software	United States	—		—	Samsung Electronics
10	February 2015	LoopPay	Mobile payment	United States	—		Samsung Pay	Samsung Electronics
11	March 2015	YESCO Electronics	Digital Billboards/Message Signs	United States	—		—	Samsung Electronics
12	June 2016	Joyent	Cloud computing	United States	—		—	Samsung Electronics
13	June 2016	AdGear	Digital advertising	Canada	—		—	Samsung Electronics
14	August 2016	Dacor (kitchen appliances)	Home appliance	United States	—		—	Samsung Electronics America
15	October 2016	Viv Labs, Inc.	Artificial intelligence	—	—		Bixby 2.0	Samsung Electronics
16	November 2016	NewNet Canada	Rich Communication Services (RCS)	Canada	—		—	Samsung Electronics Canada Inc.
17	March 2017	Harman International	Automotive electronics, Audio equipment	United States	8,000,000,000		—	Samsung Electronics
18	October 2018	Zhilabs	5G	—	—		—	Samsung Electronics
19	2019	Corephotonics	Camera technology	Israel	155,000,000		—	—
20	January 2020	Teleworld	5G	United States	—		—	Samsung Electronics
21	May 2024	Sonio SAS	Fetal ultrasound AI software	France	—		—	Samsung Medison
22	July 2024	Oxford Semantic Technologies	Knowledge graph	United Kingdom	—		—	Samsung Electronics
23	March 2025	Rainbow Robotics	Robotics	South Korea	—		—	Samsung Electronics
24	July 2025	Xealth	Digital health	United States	—		—	Samsung Electronics
25	September 2025	Sound United	Audio	United States	350,000,000		—	Harman International
26	November 2025	FläktGroup	Heating, ventilation, and air conditioning	Germany	1,800,000,000		—	Samsung Electronics
27	December 2025	ADAS business of ZF Group	Advanced driver-assistance system	Germany	1,800,000,000		—	Harman International

== Unionization ==
I will have earth cover my eyes before a union is permitted at Samsung

— Lee Byung-chull

As of April 2018, there were unions at Samsung C&T, Samsung Welstory, Samsung SDI, Samsung Life Insurance, Samsung Securities, Samsung Engineering, Samsung S One and Samsung Electronics Service. Samsung Electronics would form its first union that May.

In 2019, executives from Samsung Electronics and Everland were sentenced to prison for violating labour union-related laws.

In February 2020, Samsung Fire & Marine Insurance launched its first union. In May, Lee Jae-yong ended Samsung Group's decades-long anti-union stance. In July, Samsung Display set up a union.

In 2021, affiliates including Samsung Display, Samsung SDI, and Samsung Electronics began signing collective agreement with their labour unions.

In February 2024, Samsung Electronics Co.'s device experience (DX) division, Samsung Fire & Marine Insurance, Samsung Display, and Samsung Biologics combined to form the group's first integrated union. In June, Samsung Electronics employees started their first ever strike after failed pay and bonus negotiations. In September, Samsung Electronics employees in Tamil Nadu began striking, demanding recognition of the new Samsung India Labour Welfare Union (SILWU).

In May 2025, United Auto Workers began representing StarPlus Energy, a joint venture in Indiana between Samsung SDI and Stellantis. In November, Samsung Electronics Co. Union (SECU), Samsung Electronics Labor Union (SELU), and National Samsung Electronics Union formed a coalition around removing performance-based bonus caps and "allocations equal to 15 percent of annual operating profit." SELU was the representative union, being the largest.

In May 2026, SECU withdrew from joint negotiations due to a disproportionate focus on the semiconductor division. A tentative wage agreement was reached before the planned 18-day strike. At the beginning of May, Samsung Biologics employees started the company's first ever strike. In June, the Samsung Biologics union voted to leave the groupwide Super-Enterprise Union. In July, Samsung SDS formed its first union.

== Corporate image ==
First Samsung logo (1938)

1969–1979

1979–1993, as Samsung Electronics logo

1993–current, though still used by other Samsung companies than its electronics segment

2015–current, Samsung Electronics's wordmark and current corporate logo

The basic colour in the logo is blue, which Samsung has employed for years, supposedly symbolizing stability, reliability and corporate social responsibility.

=== Audio logo ===
Samsung has an audio logo, which consists of the notes E♭, A♭, D♭, E♭; after the initial E♭ tone it is up a perfect fourth to A♭, down a perfect fifth to D♭, then up a major second to return to the initial E♭ tone. The audio logo was produced by Musikvergnuegen and written by Walter Werzowa. This audio logo is discontinued as of 2015.

=== Font ===
In 2014, Samsung unveiled its Samsung Sharp Sans font.

In July 2016, Samsung unveiled its SamsungOne font, for legibility across varying device sizes. It supported 400 languages.

== Sponsorships ==
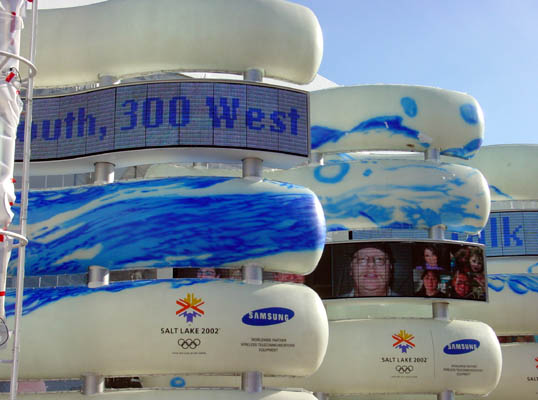
A Samsung display in Salt Lake City during the 2002 Winter Olympics

Samsung Electronics spent an estimated $14 billion (U.S.) on advertising and marketing in 2013. At 5.4% of annual revenue, this is a larger proportion than any of the world's top-20 companies by sales (Apple spent 0.6% and General Motors spent 3.5%). Samsung became the world's biggest advertiser in 2012, spending $4.3 billion, compared to Apple's $1 billion. Samsung's global brand value of $39.6 billion is less than half that of Apple.

== Controversies ==
=== Labor abuses ===
Samsung was the subject of several complaints about child labor in its supply chain from 2012 to 2015.

In July 2014, Samsung cut its contract with Shinyang Electronics after it received a complaint about the company violating child labour laws. Samsung says that its investigation turned up evidence of Shinyang using underage workers and that it severed relations immediately per its "zero tolerance" policy for child labor violations.

One of Samsung's Chinese supplier factories, HEG, was criticized for using underage workers by China Labor Watch (CLW) in July 2014. HEG denied the charges and has sued China Labor Watch. CLW issued a statement in August 2014 claiming that HEG employed over ten children under the age of 16 at a factory in Huizhou, Guangdong. The group said the youngest child identified was 14 years old. Samsung said that it conducted an onsite investigation of the production line that included one-on-one interviews but found no evidence of child labor being used. CLW responded that HEG had already dismissed the workers described in its statement before Samsung's investigators arrived.

CLW also claimed that HEG violated overtime rules for adult workers. CLW said a female college student was only paid her standard wage despite working four hours of overtime per day even though Chinese law requires overtime pay at 1.5 to 2.0 times standard wages.

In 2020, the Australian Strategic Policy Institute accused at least 82 major brands, including Samsung, of being connected to alleged forced Uyghur labor in Xinjiang.

=== Union-busting activity ===
Samsung has a no-union policy and has been engaged in union-busting activities around the world. Samsung has also been sued by a union for stealing the corpse of a dead worker. On 6 May 2020, Samsung vice chairman Lee Jae-yong apologized for the union-busting scandals.

=== 2007 slush fund scandal ===
Kim Yong-chul, the former head of the legal department at Samsung's Restructuring Office, and Catholic Priests Association for Justice uncovered Lee Kun-hee's slush fund on 29 October 2007. He presented a list of 30 artworks that the Lee family purchased with some of the slush funds, which were to be found in Samsung's warehouse in south of Seoul, along with documents about bribes to prosecutors, judges and lawmakers, tax collectors with thousands of borrowed-named bank account.

The court sentenced Lee Kun-hee to 3 years' imprisonment with 5 years' probation, and fined him ₩11 billion (US$8.21 million). But on 29 December 2009, the South Korean president Lee Myung-bak specially pardoned Lee, stating that the intent of the pardon was to allow Lee to remain on the International Olympic Committee.

Kim Yong-chul published the book Thinking about Samsung in 2010. He wrote detailed accounts of Samsung's behavior and how the company lobbied governmental authorities including the court officials, prosecutors and national tax service officials for transferring Samsung's management rights to Lee Jae-yong.

=== Lee Kun-hee's prostitution scandal ===
In July 2016, the investigative journal KCIJ-Newstapa released a video which appeared to show Samsung chairman Lee Kun-hee paying a group of prostitutes for sex acts. The footage was filmed on five occasions between December 2011 and June 2013 both at Lee's residence and a secret rental home.

Police detained six suspects for taking the compromising videos without Lee Kun-hee's knowledge. Investigators stated that, by threatening to release the tapes, the suspects were able to extort ₩500 million (US$373,057.49) from Samsung, a claim which Samsung representatives denied.

One of the suspects, surnamed Seon, was a former executive of a competitor Chaebol, CJ CheilJedang, which used to be part of Samsung Group until its separation in 1993. Lee Kun-hee's older brother is Lee Jay-hyun, the Chairman of CJ CheilJedang, and the two shared a heated rivalry. This fraternal feud fueled rumours that, as a former CJ employee had been indicted, Lee Jay-hyun had co-ordinated the scandal against his younger brother. However, prosecutors were not able to find sufficient evidence that CJ's leadership had knowledge or involvement in its former executive's actions.

On 12 April 2018, Supreme Court of Korea sentenced the former employee of CJ CheilJedang to four years and six months in prison for blackmail and intimidation.

While it was speculated that prosecutors were looking into Lee Kun-hee's culpability for sex trafficking, charges were never pursued, likely due to his health. Lee Kun-hee had suffered a heart attack in 2014 and had lapsed into a coma, where he remained until his death in 2020.

=== 2017 bribery scandal ===
In February 2017, de facto Samsung leader Lee Jae-yong was arrested for bribery, embezzlement, hiding assets overseas and perjury. In return for government approval for a merger of two Samsung affiliates, it was alleged that Lee paid ₩43 billion (US$32.08 million) to a close friend of incumbent President Park Geun-hye. He was convicted and initially sentenced to 5 years incarceration, but left prison after a year when the Seoul High Court suspended and halved his sentence. Then, following a retrial in 2021, Lee was sent back to prison for 2.5 years. He was released early after serving 10 months of his sentence in August 2021 as part of South Korea's yearly tradition of clemency on Liberation Day. In August 2022, Lee received a presidential pardon, which was supported by 70% of the Korean public, according to local polls.

=== Supporting far-right groups ===
The investigative team of special prosecutors looking into the 2016 South Korean political scandal announced that the Blue House received money from South Korea's four largest chaebols (Samsung, Hyundai Motor Group, SK Group and LG Group) to fund pro-government demonstrations by conservative and far-right organizations such as the Korean Parent Federation (KPF) and the Moms Brigade.

=== Price fixing ===
On 19 October 2011, Samsung companies were fined €145,727,000 for being part of a price cartel of ten companies for DRAMs which lasted from 1 July 1998 to 15 June 2002. The companies received, like most of the other members of the cartel, a 10% reduction for acknowledging the facts to investigators. Samsung had to pay 90% of its share of the settlement, but Micron avoided payment as a result of having initially revealed the case to investigators.

In Canada, during 1999, some DRAM microchip manufacturers conspired to price fix, among the accused included Samsung. The price fix was investigated in 2002. A recession started to occur that year, and the price fix ended; however, in 2014, the Canadian government reopened the case and investigated silently. Sufficient evidence was found and presented to Samsung and two other manufacturers during a class action lawsuit hearing. The companies agreed upon a $120 million agreement, with $40 million as a fine, and $80 million to be paid back to Canadians who purchased a computer, printer, MP3 player, gaming console or camera from April 1999 to June 2002.

=== Misleading claims ===
In Australia during 2022, Australia's competition and consumer commission fined Samsung AU$14 million. The fine came due to misleading water resistance claims for over 3.1 million smartphones. The commission stated that during 2016–2018 the company advertised its Galaxy S7, S7 Edge, A5, A7, S8, S8 Plus and Note 8 devices as able to survive short immersion in water. However, after many user complaints about the devices having issues after water submersion, such as charger port corrosion. The ACCC have officially labelled the fact these devices have "water resistance" listed as a feature misleading and proceeded with the fine.
