= Yang Sung-chun =

South Korean designer

- Yang Sung-chun in 2005
- Born: December 25, 1940; Keijo, Japanese Korea (present-day Seoul, South Korea)
- Died: June 20, 2017 (aged 76)
- Education: Seoul National University
- Known for: Graphic design

Korean name
- Hangul: 양승춘
- Hanja: 梁承椿
- RR: Yang Seungchun
- MR: Yang Sŭngch'un

Yang Sung-chun (Korean: 양승춘; Hanja: 梁承椿, 25 December 1940 – 20 June 2017) was a South Korean graphic designer. He is regarded as a great figure in graphic design in South Korea, as he produced more than 300 graphic design works.

== Life ==
Yang Seung-chun was born on 25 December 1940 in Seoul as the third of six children and showed outstanding talent in art since childhood. His grandfather was an attendant military officer who served as a secretary during the reign of Gojong of the Korean Empire. He graduated from Daegwang High School in 1959 and earned a bachelor's degree in 1965 when he graduated from Seoul National University's College of Fine Arts' Applied Arts.

In 1964, while attending Seoul National University, he was elected to the 1st Commerce Day poster contest hosted by the Korea Chamber of Commerce and Industry (KCCI). In 1965, he won the Youth Enhancement Month poster contest and won the top prize at the first National Show Window Contest held in the same year. From 1965 to 1968, he worked as a designer for Oriental Brewery (now OB Beer) and Hapdong News Agency Advertising Planning Office (now Oricom), and won the Chosun Ilbo Advertising Awards hosted by the Chosun Ilbo through an OB Beer newspaper advertisement in 1966.

From 1966 to 1968, he won three special awards at the Korea Chamber of Commerce and Industry hosted by the South Korean government. In 1969, he received state-designated official designer qualifications from the South Korean government and will serve as the first writer and judge at the Korea Industrial Design Exhibition hosted by the Korea Institute of Design Promotion (KIDP).

In 1968, he was appointed assistant and part-time lecturer in the department of applied art at Seoul National University's College of Fine Arts, and in 1970, he was appointed full-time professor. In 1974, with the support of the Ministry of Education, he participated in the "Hangul Typeface Design" research process. In 1977, a member exhibition of the Korean Society of Graphic Design (KSGD) presented the art work "World of Hangul typographic characters". In 1978, he published a thesis titled "Historical Flows of Photographic Art and Aesthetic Consideration" in the journal "Johyeong" published by Seoul National University's College of Fine Arts.

From 1966 to 1971, Lee Tae-young, Jung Si-hwa, and Bae Chun-beom, who were designers from Seoul National University, worked with the design group Prism and founded the Korean Society of Graphic Design (which later changed its name to the Korean Society of Visual Design) to expand its appearance in 1972. In the 1970s, he worked with his university seniors and fellow professors, Cho Young-je and Kim Kyo-man, and served as chairman of the Korean Society of Visual Design (KSVD) from 1977 to 1980.

Since the production of OB Beer CI in 1974, it has participated in design projects by various public organizations and companies. In 1983, he produced the official emblem for the 1988 Summer Olympics. He participated in the operation of the disabled welfare center from 1998 to 2010, as he served as a member of the Seoul Welfare Center for the Disabled.

In 2006, when he retired from the College of Fine Arts at Seoul National University, he was appointed as an honorary professor, and in 2015, he was inducted into the 4th Designer Hall of Fame with Ahn Jung-eon and Jung Si-hwa from the Korea Institute of Design Promotion. On June 20, 2017, he died at the age of 77.

== Major design projects ==
- 1974 OB Beer CI
- 1975 Cheil Jedang (currently CJ CheilJedang) CI
- 1976 Cheil Industries (currently Samsung C&T Corporation) CI
- 1976 Cheil Synthetics (currently Toray Chemical Korea) CI
- 1977 Shinsegae Department Store CI
- 1977 Korea National Housing Corporation CI
- 1980 Hanil Bank CI
- 1980 Catholic Medical Center CI
- 1980 St. Mary's Hospital CI
- 1982 Dongbang Life Insurance (now Samsung Life Insurance) CI
- 1984 National Museum of Modern and Contemporary Art CI
- 1984 Hanssem CI
- 1984 Kumbokju CI
- 1987 Hanyang Investment & Finance CI
- 1989 Samyang Corporation CI
- 1989 Baekwha CI
- 1990 Jonggajip CI
- 1991 SBS (Seoul Broadcasting System) CI
- 1994 Gwanak-gu Office, Seoul CI
- 1995 Catholic University of Korea CI
- 2000 Seoul Community Rehabilitation Center CI
