= Solaris (credit institution) =

German banking-as-a-service credit institution

Solaris SE
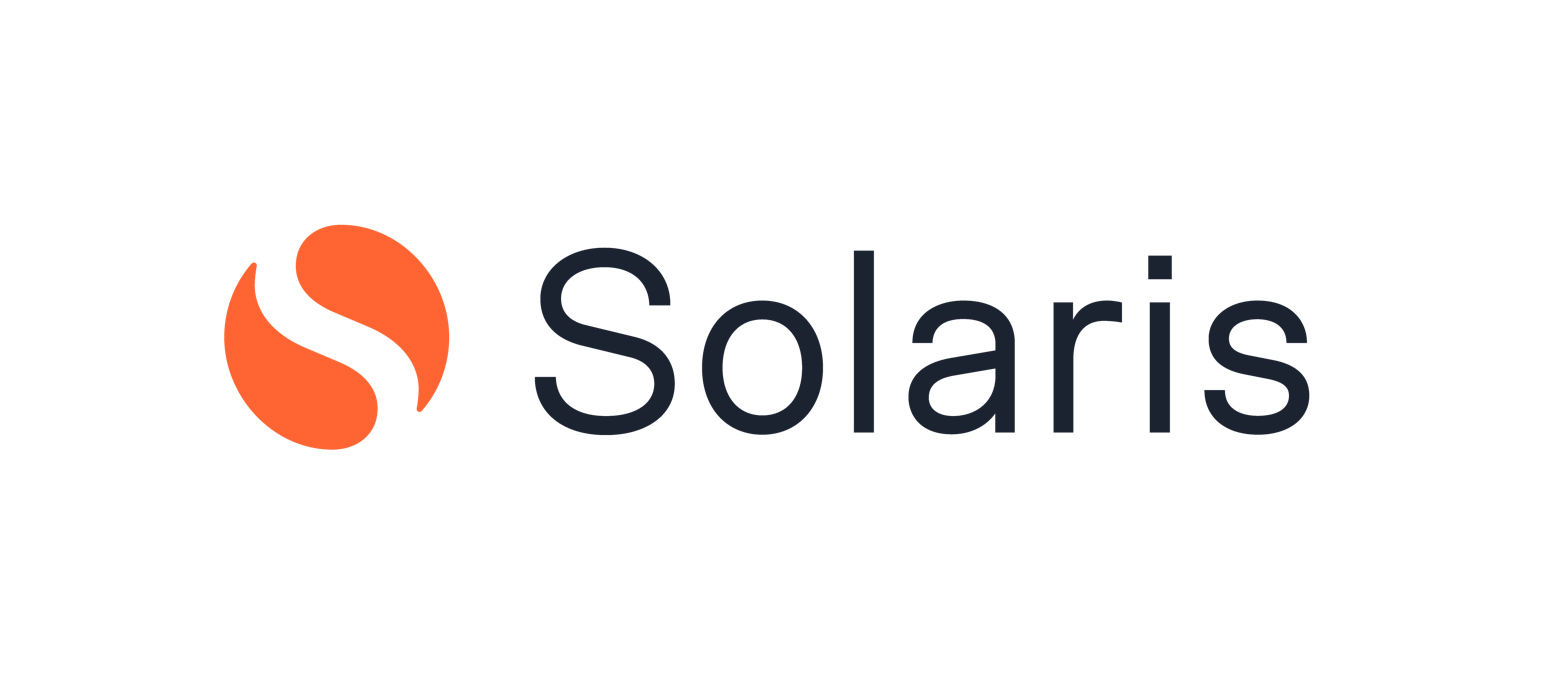
- Type: Societas Europaea
- Industry: Banking *Financial services
- Founded: March 2016; 10 years ago
- Founder: Andreas Bittner; Marko Wenthin
- Headquarters: Berlin, Germany
- Area served: Europe
- Key people: Carsten Höltkemeyer (CEO)
- Services: Banking-as-a-Service, KYC, Cards, Digital Asset, Lending
- Revenue: $130.900.000 (2022)
- Number of employees: 700+
- Website: https://solarisgroup.com/

Solaris SE is a credit institution licensed in Germany. Known as Solarisbank AG until November 2022, it is headquartered in Berlin and has branches in London, Paris, Milan, Madrid and Vilnius.

The company's business is the operation of digital banking (bank accounts, debit and credit cards, consumer loans, e.g. buy-now-pay-later) and other financial services (e-money, payment transactions)

== Background ==
=== Overview ===
Solaris SE was established in 2015 as a part of Finleap, a fintech company builder based in Berlin, Germany, with Andreas Bittner and Marko Wenthin as its founders. Solaris was officially launched in March 2016, after receiving its banking license.

In October 2016, the company entered into a strategic partnership with MasterCard in order to develop novel banking modules.

In February 2017, Solaris raised €26.3 million in its series A funding round from Yabeo Capital, Arvato Financial Solutions, Finleap, Unicredit and the Japan-based SBI group. The company also brought in Dr. Roland Folz as CEO.

In March 2017, Solaris is said to have brought over 20 companies onto its banking platform and it is reported to have passported its banking license to six European countries.

In March 2018, Solaris raised $70 million in Series B funding from Arvato Financial Solutions, SBI Group, BBVA, Visa, Lakestar and ABN AMRO's Digital Impact Fund.

In June 2020, Solaris raised €60 million in Series C funding led by HV Capital with participation from Vulcan Capital, Samsung Catalyst Fund and Storm Ventures.

In March 2025, SBI Group became the majority shareholder of Solaris after a €140 million Series G funding round.

=== Technology ===
Solaris provides a white label banking platform, which is said to allow its users, mostly digital companies and financial services startups, to access various banking service modules, which then can be integrated into their processes, websites or mobile applications.

== Special audit ==
In January 2022, the Federal Financial Supervisory Authority (BaFin) of Germany ordered a special audit because of organizational deficiencies identified during a bank supervisory audit from 2020. The independent external auditors are supposed to verify whether Solaris has implemented the respective measures which were agreed with BaFin as a result of the Art. 44 KWG standard audit. Folz publicly welcomed this action, claiming that the company held no secrets. In late 2022, after the audit, Solaris was ordered by the Federal Financial Supervisory Authority to take action to “ensure proper business organization in risk management and money laundering prevention and to limit risks”.

Finom is one of the neobanks which uses Solaris' services as well as its bank code.

== Awards and recognition ==
Solaris SE was one of the finalists for the "Most Disruptive Innovation" Award at the 2016 Global Banking Awards, held in Spain.

== See also ==
- List of banks in Germany
