= Samsung Medison =

Diagnostic ultrasound manufacturer

Samsung Medison Co. Ltd. 삼성메디슨
- Company type: Subsidiary
- Industry: Medical Instrument Research & Manufacturing
- Founded: 1985; 41 years ago
- Number of employees: 1,040 (2019.12)
- Parent: Samsung Electronics
- Website: http://www.samsungmedison.com

Samsung Medison Co., Ltd. (Korean: 삼성메디슨) is a manufacturer of diagnostic ultrasound systems. The company was founded in 1985 and acquired by Samsung in 2010 with the purchase reported to be at more than $262 million US dollars. In 2020, Samsung Medison was selling its medical devices in 110 countries, which accruals up to 85 percent of its total sales.

== History ==
In 2016, Samsung showcases FDA-Cleared GM85 Mobile Digital Radiography System, produced and developed in partnership with Samsung Medison, at the Radiological Society of North America's (RSNA) 102nd Scientific Assembly and Annual Meeting in Chicago.

In 2017, Samsung Medison introduces the HS40 ultrasound system, which is optimized for obstetrician diagnostic use. The HS40 allows Samsung Medison to provide a full lineup of medical equipment.

In 2018, at the Radiological Society of North America 2018 Annual Meeting (RSNA 2018) in Chicago, the Samsung Electronics and its affiliate Samsung Medison introduced several types of diagnostic imaging software.

In 2019, Samsung Medison introduces the HERA I10 Combination Ultrasound System. The HERA I10 Combination Ultrasound System comes with an ultrasound-exam chair as well as IT, semiconductor image processing, and communication technologies for diagnosis purposes.

In 2020, Samsung Medison and Samsung Electronics announces Samsung Medison's entrance into the medical device market, including the diagnostic ultrasound market.

In 2024, Samsung Medison launched Samsung theSUITE, an online ultrasound education platform designed to support healthcare professionals through structured educational content, clinical case studies, and training resources related to diagnostic ultrasound.
