= AiMotive =

Hungarian autonomous vehicle technology company

aiMotive
- Formerly: AdasWorks
- Industry: Automotive technology
- Founded: 2015 in Budapest, Hungary
- Founder: László Kishonti
- Headquarters: Budapest, Hungary
- Key people: László Kishonti (CEO)
- Number of employees: 220 (2020)
- Parent: Independent (2015–22); Stellantis (2022–present)
- Website: aimotive.com

aiMotive (formerly AdasWorks) is an autonomous vehicle technology company. The company aims to work with automotive manufacturers and Tier1s to enable automated technologies. aiMotive describes its approach as "vision-first", a system that primarily relies on cameras and artificial intelligence to detect its surroundings. The technology is designed to be implemented by automobile manufacturers to create autonomous vehicles, which can operate in all conditions and locations. In September 2017, PSA Group teamed up with AImotive.

On December 22, 2022, the company was acquired by the multinational automotive manufacturing corporation, Stellantis.

== History ==
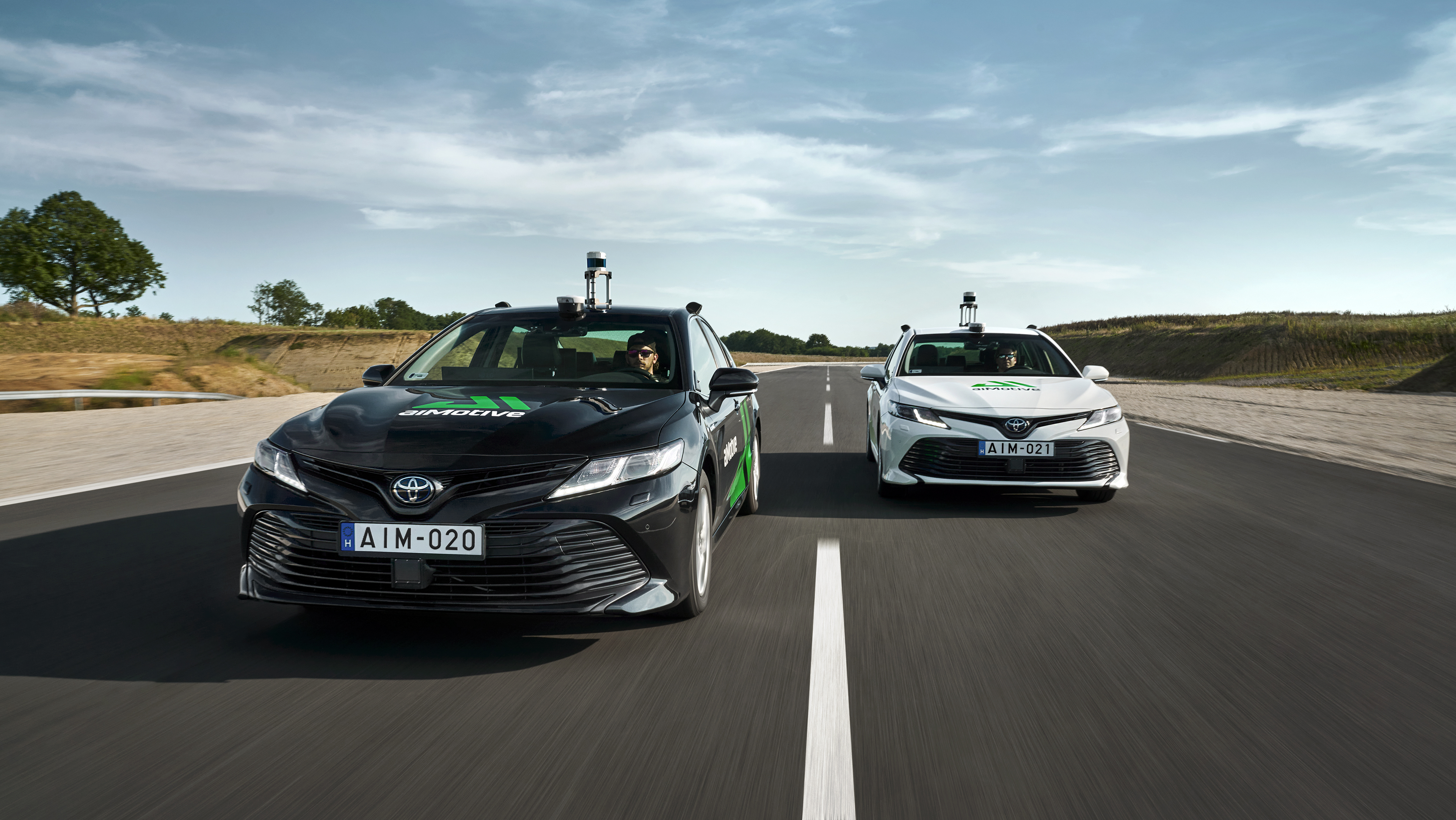
Two aiMotive prototypes during testing

The company was founded in Budapest, Hungary as AdasWorks by Laszlo Kishonti in 2015. aiMotive is a spin-off of the founder's previous company, Kishonti Ltd, which was a computer hardware benchmarking company. In November 2016, the company changed its name to aiMotive.

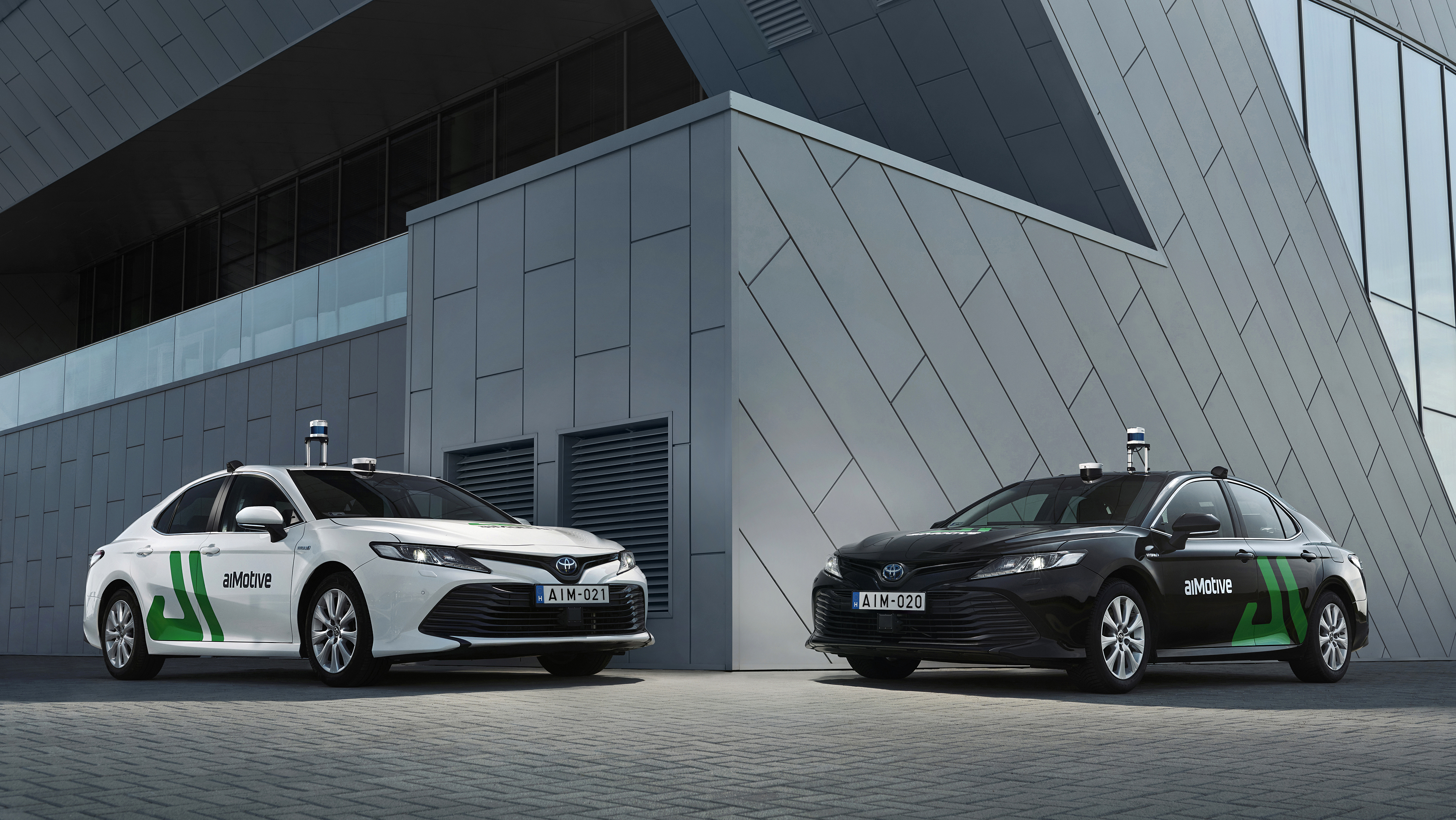
Two aiMotive prototypes at the ZalaZone proving ground

The company has closed four venture capital investment rounds. The first investment round of $2,500,000 was announced on 15 May 2015 and was led by Inventure Oy. In a second round of funding the company received $10.5 million in funding from Robert Bosch Venture Capital, Draper Associates, Nvidia, Tamares Group and others. On 4 January 2018 aiMotive announced a Series C round of $38 million funded by investors B Capital, Prime Ventures and others. This round made aiMotive the second largest Hungarian-based startup based on venture capital investment. In May 2020 the company announced a fourth investment round of US$20 million. The injection was led by earlier investors. AImotive outlined plans to expand with offices in Detroit (Michigan, US) and Munich (Germany).

aiMotive first created a prototype which it tested on the Hungarian Formula 1 Grand Prix track, Hungaroring.

The company received its first public road test license in Finland in spring 2017. aiMotive has similar test licenses in Hungary, the State of California, and the State of Nevada. As of January 2018, the company tests its technology on Toyota, Citroen and Volvo models. The company's headquarters remained in Hungary. aiMotive has offices in Mountain View, California and Yokohama Japan.

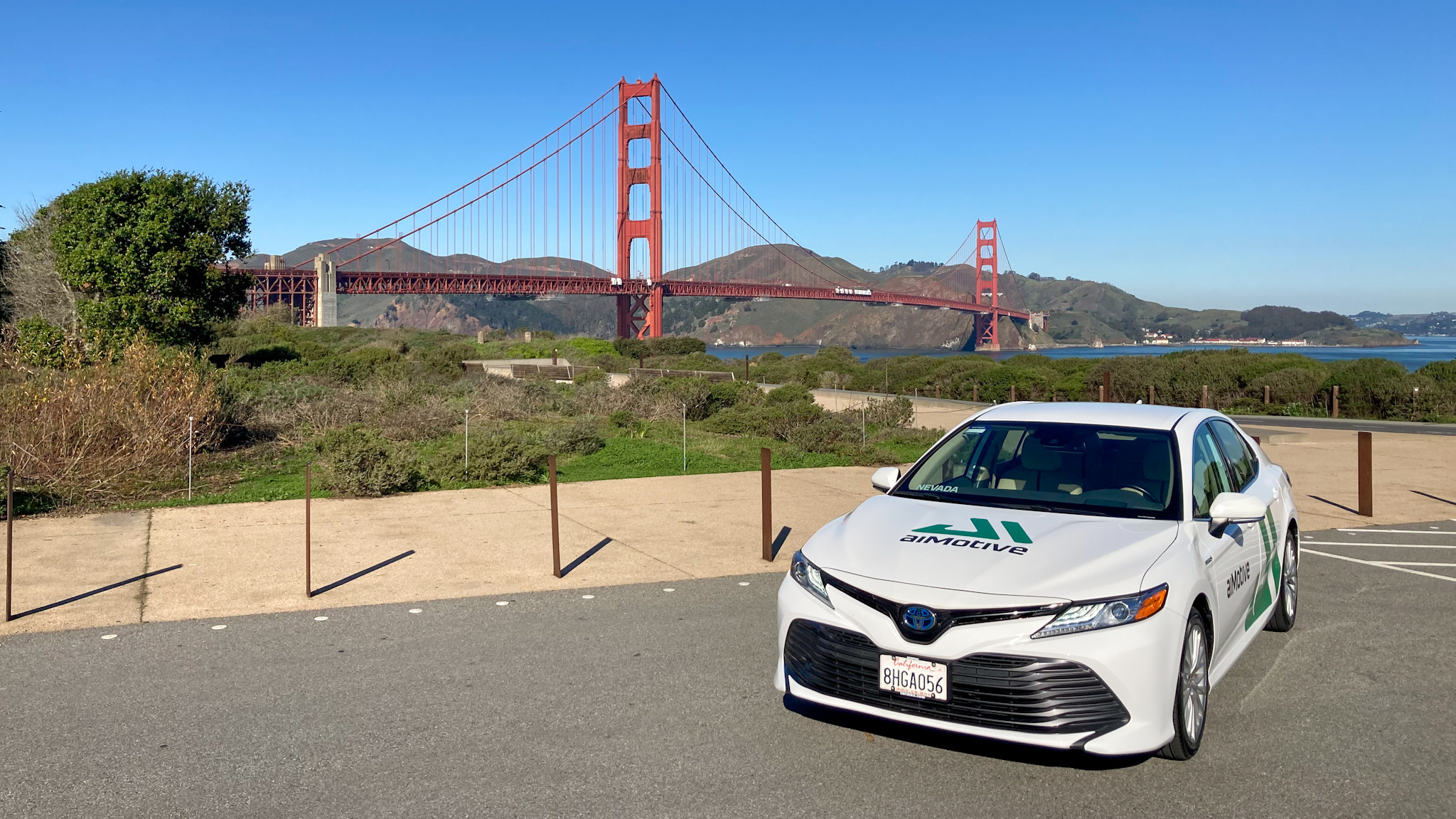
An aiMotive prototype Toyota Camry in front of the Golden Gate bridge

In 2016 Nvidia confirmed it was working with aiMotive (AdasWorks at the time) and Volvo within the DriveMe project. In September 2017 aiMotive and PSA Groupe announced a partnership to develop a highway autopilot. The same year aiMotive announced it was developing an artificial intelligence accelerator, branded as aiWare. aiMotive partnered with VeriSilicon and GlobalFoundries to create test chips of the architecture for use in its prototypes. At the Consumer Electronics Show 2018 the Samsung Strategy and Innovation Center announced its DRVLINE platform in which aiMotive is listed as a software technology partner.

The South Korean fabless semiconductor company, Nextchip has licensed aiWare for their Apache5 and Apache6 automotive domain processors.

aiMotive was listed as a partner of Sony's Vision-S concept car at CES 2021. The company subsequently announced it was creating L2+ automated driving systems for the concept vehicle.

In November 2022, it was announced aiMotive had been acquired by the multinational automotive manufacturing corporation, Stellantis. The acquisition was completed in December 2022.

== Technology ==
aiMotive is developing three branches of technology connected to autonomous vehicles. aiDrive is a software stack for automated driving. aiSim is a virtual simulation environment, and aiWare, a silicon IP for chips that compute artificial intelligence.

aiDrive utilizes artificial intelligence and data from cameras and other sensors. aiMotive focuses on processing visual information, this approach is similar to that of Tesla, which some industry experts consider risky. The company tests its technology on highways in the United States and Europe.

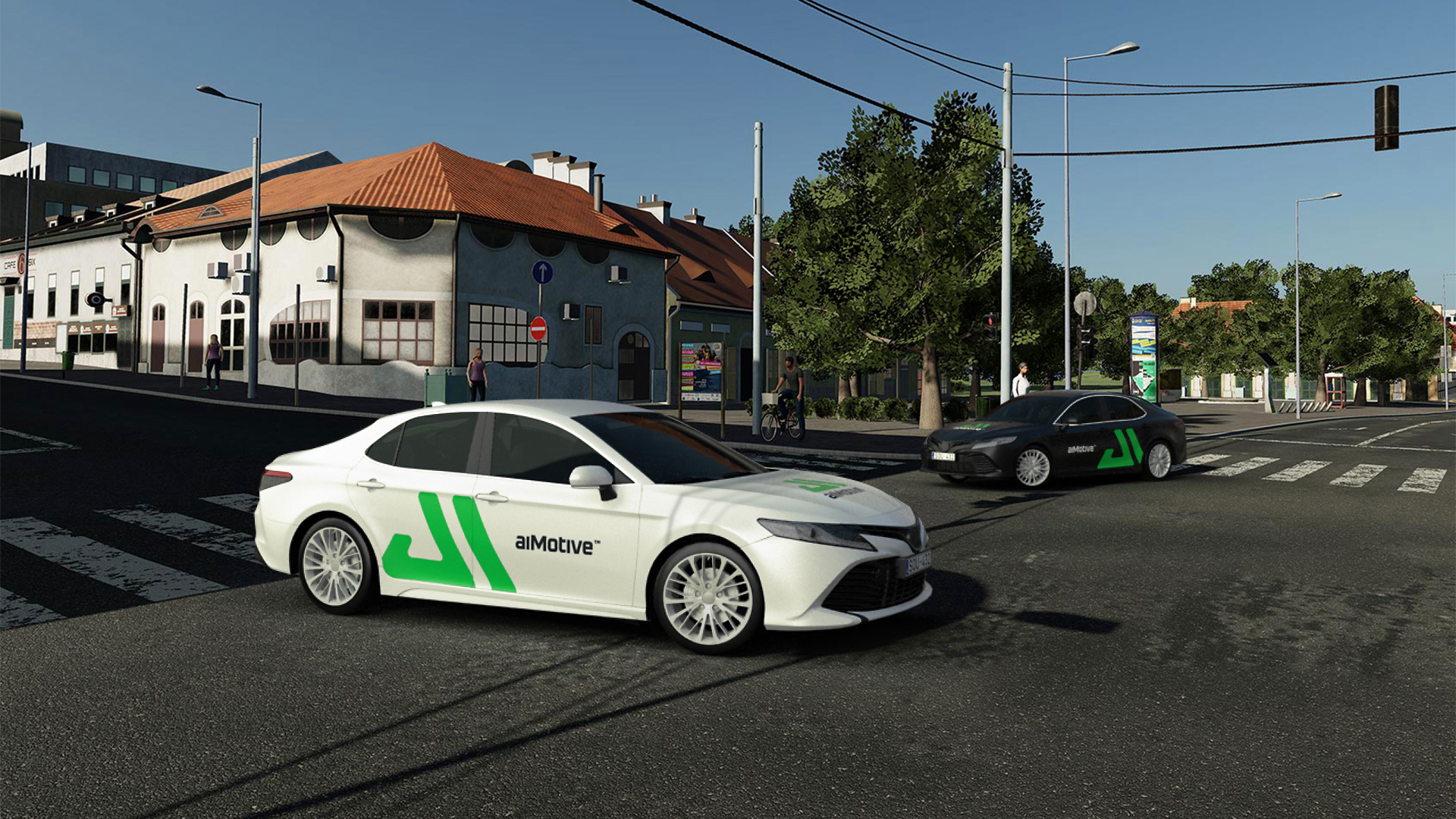
A street view created by aiMotive's ISO26262 certified, ASIL-D simulator, aiSim

aiSim is a virtual simulation environment for testing autonomous vehicles. In spring 2020 aiMotive announced that the simulator had received ISO 26262 tool certification to TCL3.

The hardware architecture by aiMotive is a dedicated embedded artificial intelligence accelerator optimized for but not limited to computer vision with high-resolution input. In 2020 the company announced that it was collaborating with Hungarian space technology startup C3S to create neural network acceleration platforms for applications in space. aiWare has also been integrated into Nextchip's Apache5 imaging edge processor for automotive applications.

== In popular media ==
aiMotive was featured on the British television show Guy Martin vs The Robot Car which aired on 26 November 2017. In the show, British motorcycle racer and television personality Guy Martin visits the company's headquarters and participates in a test drive on a Hungarian Motorway.

In December 2020, aiMotive CEO, László Kishonti participated in an online international panel discussion about the future of artificial intelligence with renowned researchers such as Neil deGrasse Tyson, Stuart J. Russell, George Tilesch, and György Buzsáki.
