= Samsung Capital =

Samsung Capital Co, Ltd.
- Company type: Subsidiary
- Industry: Financial services
- Founded: 1999; 27 years ago
- Headquarters: Seoul, South Korea
- Parent: Samsung

Samsung Capital Co, Ltd. is a Korean financial company, established in 1999 with headquarters in Seoul, South Korea. It is the financial services unit of Samsung. Its divisions are responsible for over 50% of Samsung Electronics revenue.

== See also ==
- Economy of South Korea
- Samsung Electronics
- Samsung
