= Samsung E&A =

South Korean construction company

Samsung E&A Co., Ltd.
- Logo since 2024
- Native name: 삼성이앤에이 주식회사
- Formerly: Korea Engineering (1970–1991); Samsung Engineering (1991–2024)
- Company type: Public
- Traded as: KRX: 028050
- Industry: Construction
- Founded: 20 January 1970; 56 years ago
- Headquarters: 26, Sangil-ro 6-gil, Gangdong-gu, Seoul, South Korea
- Parent: Samsung Group
- Website: www.samsungena.com

Samsung E&A Co., Ltd. (Korean: 삼성이앤에이), formerly Samsung Engineering, is a Korean construction and project management (EPC&PM) company, it provides a full range of engineering services including feasibility studies, design, procurement, construction, and commissioning.

It is included in the KOSPI 200, and as of 30 June 2021, the number of listed stocks is 196,000,000 shares, the capital is 980 billion KRW, and the market cap is 4.68 trillion KRW.

== History ==
Korea Engineering was founded in 1970 by the Korean government as the country's first engineering company. It was acquired by Samsung Group in 1978. During the 1970s and 80s, the Korean government prioritized the development of heavy and chemical industries and Korea Engineering was in charge of the design of projects such as the Korea National Oil Corp. refinery, the Namhae fertilizer plant and the Honam petrochemical plant.

Korea Engineering was renamed to Samsung Engineering in 1991. In 1993, the company was awarded its first overseas project, a natural gas separation plant in Thailand. Throughout the 1990s and 2000s, Samsung Engineering continued its international expansion and international projects now account for the majority of the company's business.

In the 2010s, Samsung Engineering expanded into new business areas including power plants and steel mills and at the same time took on complex billion-dollar projects in Saudi Arabia and the UAE. The company was ill-prepared for the execution of these projects, leading to a 1.3 billion US dollar loss in 2015.

== See also ==
- Samsung Group
