= Simband =

Research platform

Simband is a research platform announced by Samsung Strategy and Innovation Center in 2014. It was announced on May 28, 2014, in San Francisco, in partnership with UCSF Digital Health Innovation Lab.

Simband is an open developer platform consisting of a watch unit running Tizen and a wristband connector that holds a custom sensor module.

Simband is designed to be modular and allow for different sensor modules to be installed. Samsung provides a reference implementation of a sensor module called Simsense that supports multiple sensors, each generating a unique data stream. In November 2014 Samsung announced two custom modules developed by third parties.
