= Hansol =

South Korean conglomerate

Hansol 한솔그룹 韓松製紙株式會社
- Company type: Chaebol
- Industry: Papermaking, chemical, biotechnology
- Founded: 1965; 61 years ago
- Headquarters: Jung-gu, Seoul, SCA, South Korea
- Key people: Dong-gil Cho
- Website: www.hansol.com

Hansol Group (Korean: 한솔그룹) is a South Korean conglomerate, or chaebol. The corporation's main operations are paper products, electronics, chemicals, logistics, IT technology and solution services, household interiors, and construction. Hansol used to be a part of Samsung Group, and is still owned by one of the relatives of the Lee Byung-chul family.

== History ==
On June 18, 2019 Hansol Paper and Iconex announced that the companies will withdraw the agreement of the Scades and R+S Hansol Paper promised to supply Iconex due to the United Kingdom's Competition and Markets Authority (CMA) extending the transaction process.

In December 2019 Hansol Group set up a production company in Vietnam called Hansol Electronics Vietnam Hochiminhcity. An investment of 3.57 billion won was made into the operation. The Vietnam production company will begin Hansol's Liquid Crystal Module (LCM) business, which is produced by combining the Liquid Criystal Display (LCD) module with a blacklight unit.

In 2020 Hansol Group announced its expected contract with Samsung Electronics. The contract will involve the production of TVs for Samsung Electronics.

On March 3, 2021 Hansol Group announced that on March 24, 2021, its chairman Cho Dong-gil will be appointed as an inside director at the shareholders' meeting of Hansol Paper and Hansol Technics, two major affiliates of the Hansol Group.

== Affiliates ==
=== Hansol paper ===
The Hansol Paper was split off of the Samsung family in 1991 and is the main affiliate of the Hansol Group. Hansol Paper, Korea's largest paper production firm, has been in operation for 53 years since 1966 and generates an annual revenue of US$1.6 billion in the thermal paper industry. Hansol Paper works in the printing paper, special paper, and industrial paper industries.

=== Hansol Holdings ===
Hansol Holdings is a holding company founded on January 19, 1965. Hansol Holdings is an affiliate of the Hansol Group that works in the business counseling and consulting, brand management, and investment asset management business.

=== Hansol EME ===
Hansol EME is a consulting services firm founded on September 1, 2001. Hansol EME is an affiliate of the Hansol Group that works in the small and medium-sized power plants, plant engineering, complex environmental energy, and O&M industries.

=== Hansol Papertech ===
Hansol Papertech is a wrapping paper manufacturing company founded in 1979. Hansol Papertech is an affiliate of the Hansol Group that works in the packaging materials industries. Hansol Papertech produces surface paper, scrap paper, and medium paper.

=== Hansol PNS ===
Hansol PNS is a paper distribution company and IT services business established in 1993. Hansol PNS is an affiliate of the Hansol Group.

=== Hansol Homedeco ===
Hansol Homedeco is an interior material company founded in 1991. Hansol Homedeco is an affiliate of the Hansol Group that works in interior materials industry as well as plantation, lumber, woodpowder and new & renewable energy industries.

=== Hansol Logistics ===
Hansol Logistics is an affiliate of the Hansol Group founded in 1973 and was originally known as Hansol CSN. Hansol logistics work in the domestic land transportation business, import-export integrated logistics business, and 3PL business.

=== Hansol Technics ===
Hansol Technics is an affiliate of the Hansol Group founded in 1966. Hansol Technics works in the semiconductor and other electronic component manufacturing industry. Hansol Technics specialize in the electronic, solar, LED material, and electronics manufacturing services (EMS) businesses.

=== Hansol Inticube ===
Hansol Inticube is an affiliate of the Hansol Group founded in 2003. Hansol Inticube supplies mobile operators with software-based exchanger solutions. Hansol Inticube specializes in technology development.

=== Hansol Chemical ===
Hansol Chemical is an affiliate of the Hansol Group founded in 1980. Hansol Chemical is a global chemical materials company that supplies the economy with chemical products, including papermaking chemicals, environmental chemicals, IT chemicals, and household chemicals. Its production facilities are located in its Jeonju plant, Xi’an plant, and Ulsan plant.

=== Tapex ===
Tapex is an affiliate of the Hansol Group and was founded in 1977 and was acquired by the Hansol group in 2016 with $114.5 million dollars. Tapex produces a variety of electronic and consumer good products, such as tape for fixating the backs of TSPs, tape for secondary batteries, tape for semiconductor packing processes, functional tape, Uniwraps for food packaging etc. In 2014, Tapex earned an operating income of 14.1 billion won and 111.5 billion won for sales.

== See also ==
- Economy of South Korea
- List of South Korean companies
