= Samsung Asset Management =

South Korean company

Samsung Asset Management Co., Ltd.
- Native name: 삼성자산운용 (三星資産運用)
- Formerly: Samsung Life Investment Trust Management; Samsung Investment Trust Management
- Type: Subsidiary
- Industry: Financial services
- Founded: 1998; 28 years ago
- Headquarters: Seoul, South Korea
- Key people: Seo Bong-Kyun (CEO)
- AUM: ▲US$233.4 billion (2020)
- Number of employees: 369 (2022)
- Parent: Samsung Life Insurance
- Website: www.samsungfund.com

Samsung Asset Management Co., Ltd. (Korean: 삼성자산운용) is a South Korean asset management company headquartered in Seoul, South Korea, and a subsidiary of the Samsung Life Insurance. It is the largest asset management company in South Korea.

== History ==
In September 1998, Samsung Life Investment Trust Management was founded.

In March 2000, the company changed its name to Samsung Investment Trust Management. It became part of Samsung Securities.

In January 2002, the company listed its first ETF, KODEX 200 on the Korea Exchange.

In November 2007, the company opened its first overseas office in Hong Kong. A year later it opened an office in Singapore.

In April 2010, the company changed its name to Samsung Asset Management.

In 2014, the company became a wholly owned subsidiary of Samsung Life Insurance.

In 2015, the company and the Capital Group signed a strategic partnership agreement to develop active investment strategies for investors in Korea. In the same year, it also signed a strategic partnership agreement with China Construction Bank to launch ETF products in China.

In 2016, the company signed a strategic partnership agreement with Edmond de Rothschild Group to cross sell mutual funds in Korea and Europe.

In 2017, the company spun off Samsung Active Asset Management and Samsung Hedge Asset Management.

In 2022, the company launched Samsung Blockchain Technologies ETF, the first of its kind in Hong Kong.

In January 2023, the company launched Samsung Bitcoin Futures Active ETF in Hong Kong.
