= Samsung Strategy and Innovation Center =

Division of Samsung Electronics

- Industry: Consumer electronics Health technology Internet of Things; Artificial intelligence
- Headquarters: Menlo Park, California, United States
- Area served: Worldwide
- Key people: Young Sohn
- Parent: Samsung Electronics
- Website: www.samsung.com/us/ssic/

Samsung Strategy and Innovation Center (SSIC) is a division of Samsung Electronics. It works with entrepreneurs and corporate partners to invest in disruptive technologies, such as artificial intelligence, digital health, mobility, the Internet of Things, and other consumer-facing applications of data-driven technology.

SSIC was founded in 2012 and is headquartered in Menlo Park, California with additional locations in San Jose, California, Paris, France, Tel Aviv, Israel and Seoul, South Korea. SSIC is led by Young Sohn, Samsung Electronics' president and chief strategy officer.

== History ==
In February 2013, Samsung announced it was establishing the Samsung Strategy and Innovation Center to create a "global engine to accelerate innovation and to drive new business creation." As part of that effort, Samsung also launched the Samsung Catalyst Fund, a multi-stage venture capital fund that operates with SSIC to expand Samsung's mobile, device solutions and consumer electronics groups. Young Sohn, Samsung's president and chief strategy officer, was appointed to lead SSIC at the time of its founding.

In 2014, SSIC launched the Smart Health Initiative and announced a health technology platform, Simband. It is a wearable digital health device with a custom sensor module that developers use to design digital health algorithms, analyze real-time health data, and connect to a data exchange platform. In 2015, SSIC announced the Samsung ARTIK platform for IoT applications, and the Samsung ARTIK Challenge, which invited contestants to develop technology to reduce global water consumption. In 2016, SSIC partnered with Nestlé's Institute of Health Sciences on IoT and nutrition science to develop applications for personalized fitness and nutrition data.

In 2017, SSIC helped secure the $8 billion acquisition of Harman International Industries. Young Sohn was appointed Chairman of the Harman board of directors upon the acquisition's completion. That same year, SSIC established the $300 million Samsung Automotive Innovation Fund to invest in the automotive sector.

In 2018, SSIC introduced Samsung DRVLINE, an open, modular, and scalable autonomous vehicle platform. Samsung decided in 2018 to shut down the ARTIK business that had been started by SSIC in 2015.
