= Samsung Catalyst Fund =

Venture capital fund of Samsung Electronics

- Type: Corporate venture capital
- Founded: 2013
- Headquarters: San Jose, California, United States
- Website: www.samsungcatalyst.com

The Samsung Catalyst Fund (SCF) is the evergreen venture capital fund of Samsung Electronics. The fund invests in deep technology, artificial intelligence and big data startups. The fund's headquarters are located in San Jose, California, with offices in Seoul, Tel Aviv, and Paris.

== History ==
In February 2013, Samsung Electronics launched a new fully owned investment fund, called the Samsung Catalyst Fund, or SCF. The announcement was made at an event in Menlo Park. The fund is distinct from Samsung's other investment arms, Samsung Ventures investments and Samsung NEXT.

== Approach ==
The fund has a multi-stage investment strategy and seeks to invest in startups in the data center, cloud computing, edge computing, artificial intelligence, quantum computing, 5G, automotive technology, robotics and digital health spaces. Startups in the fund's portfolio are selected both for value creation and their potential creative impact on Samsung. The fund additionally looks for startups that provide support to Samsung's components business and semiconductor units, as well as a focus on cloud infrastructure and internet of things.

Alongside capital, the fund provides shared resources, networking, corporate development, and mentorship for its portfolio companies.

== Portfolio investments ==
As of May 2021, the fund has made more than 60 investments, including AIMotive, SambaNova, Fungible, Graphcore, SoundHound Inc, Rescale, and Valens Semiconductor. The fund has seen multiple exits, including Argus Cyber Security, which was acquired by Continental AG in November 2017; Babblelabs, which was acquired by Cisco; Datrium, which was acquired by VMWare; Habana Labs which was acquired by Intel; Mapillary, which was acquired by Facebook; Preventice Solutions, which was acquired by Boston Scientific; Pixeom, which was acquired by Siemens; and Ring, which was acquired by Amazon.

The fund has also had portfolio companies go public, including Innoviz Technologies, which began trading on the Nasdaq exchange (under the ticker symbols INVZ and INVZW) on April 6, 2021, and raised $371 million in its market debut, and IonQ which went public on the New York Stock Exchange under the ticker symbol “IONQ” on March 8, 2021, and raised $650M. On May 25, 2021, Valens announced going public on the New York Stock Exchange under the symbol “VLN” and plan for raising $240M.
