= Samsung Life Insurance =

South Korean multinational company

Samsung Life Insurance 삼성생명
- Native name: 삼성생명보험 (三星生命保險)
- Company type: Public
- Traded as: KRX: 032830
- Industry: Insurance
- Founded: 1957; 69 years ago
- Headquarters: Seoul, South Korea
- Key people: Jeon Young-muk (CEO)
- Products: Life insurance Health insurance Annuities
- Revenue: ▲KRW 34.53 trillion (2020)
- Net income: ▲KRW 1.79 trillion (2020)
- Total assets: ▲KRW 336.6 trillion (2020)
- Total equity: ▲KRW 43.61 trillion (2020)
- Owners: Estate of Jay Y. Lee (20.32%); Shinsegae Group (8.07%); National Pension Service (6.33%)
- Number of employees: 6,266 (2010)
- Parent: Samsung
- Subsidiaries: Samsung Asset Management Co. Ltd.
- Website: www.samsunglife.com

Samsung Life Insurance (Korean: 삼성생명보험) is a South Korean multinational insurance company headquartered in Seoul, South Korea, and a subsidiary of the Samsung Group. It is the largest insurance company in South Korea and a Fortune Global 500 company.

Samsung Life's principal products include life, health insurance and annuities. Samsung Life was a private company from its foundation in 1957 until it went public in May 2010. The IPO was the largest in South Korean history and made Samsung Life one of the country's most valuable companies measured by market capitalization. Its headquarters are situated across from Namdaemun, a historic gate located in the heart of Seoul.

== History ==
Founded in 1957, the company quickly grew and attained a market leading position after just 18 months of operations. Since then, Samsung Life Insurance has maintained its market leadership in the industry through product innovation, marketing, and distribution. In particular, the growth was accelerated after the company was incorporated under Samsung Group in 1963.

In 1986, the company opened representative offices in New York and Tokyo. It has also expanded in overseas operation through a joint venture in Thailand in 1997 and China in 2005. The company was the first life insurance company in Korea to achieve KRW 100 Trillion Won in assets in 2006. On May 12, 2010, Samsung Life Insurance went public and the shares went for 110,000 won, or $96/share in one of the largest initial offerings and a record for the country, raising $4.4 billion.

== See also ==
- List of Korean companies
- Yongin Samsung Life Blueminx
