= Comparison of online music lockers =

This is a comparison of online music storage services (Cloud Music Services), Internet services that allow uploads of personally owned or licensed music to the cloud for listening on multiple devices.

Previously, there were three large services—Amazon Music, Apple's iTunes Match, and YouTube Music—each incorporating an online music store (see comparison), with purchased songs from the associated music store not counting toward storage limits. Other than additional storage space, the main additional feature provided with an annual fee by Apple (and formerly Amazon.com) was "scan-and-match", which examined music files on a computer and added a copy of matched tracks to the user's music locker without having to upload the files. Google provided both a large amount of storage space and the scan-and-match feature at no cost.

Amazon was the first of the initially-significant players to launch their cloud music locker service, in late March 2011, and the first to discontinue it, on 30 April 2018. Amazon Music launched without obtaining any new music streaming licenses, which upset the major record labels. Amazon eventually negotiated licenses before launching scan-and-match.

Google launched their service less than a month and a half after Amazon, also without obtaining any new licenses. Like Amazon, Google eventually negotiated licenses before launching scan-and-match. In 2018, Google announced a transition from Google Play Music to YouTube Music, and in May, 2020, Google had created a transfer tool to migrate added albums, uploads, history, and playlists. On October 22, 2020, Google Play Music was discontinued.

Apple was the last of the first three services to launch, which they did on October 12, 2011. However, Apple had negotiated ahead of time with the major record labels for new licenses. Apple's product is the only of the three to remain in operation today (see iTunes Match, below).

For streaming services where a person is unable to upload their own music, but is limited to music provided by the service, such as Pandora Radio and Spotify, see Comparison of on-demand streaming music services. See that article also for information on subscription streaming services provided by four of the companies below (Google Play Music All Access, Apple's Apple Music, Amazon's Prime Music, and Microsoft's Groove Music Pass).

== Comparison ==
	YouTube Music	iTunes Match
Owner:	YouTube LLC (Google LLC)	Apple Inc.
Launch date:	2015-11-12	2011-10-12
Currently Available:	Yes	Yes
Web Client:	Yes	No
Windows Client:	No	Yes
Android App:	Yes	No
iOS App:	Yes	Yes
Other listening platforms:	Google Home, Sonos, Chromecast, Android TV, Android Auto	Apple TV, other AirPlay
Upload software:	Web browser	Windows, macOS
Music Format:	AAC	AAC, MP3
Filetypes matched:	None	AAC, AIFF, ALAC, MP3, WAV
Filetypes transcoded:	FLAC, M4A, MP3, OGG, WMA	AIFF, ALAC, WAV
Maximum file size:	300 MB	200 MB or 2 hours
Free Bitrate:	256 kbit/s	None
Premium Bitrate:	256 kbit/s	256 kbit/s
Free Storage: (Note: Purchased music files from associated music store do not count toward space limits.)	100,000 songs	None
Premium Storage:	100,000 songs	100,000 files (Note: In the United States and Australia, iTunes Match also gets you ad-free iTunes Radio listening.)
Premium service features:	Ads-free, background play, download music offline, use audio-only mode, travel with YouTube Music, shuffle downloads, Apple Carplay & Android Auto compatibility	
Premium pricing:	$9.99 per month (YouTube Music Premium) $11.99 per month (YouTube Premium)	Annual fee of $24.99 (US), £21.99 (UK), €24.99 (FR), $39.99 (AU) Included with $9.99 per month Apple Music subscription
Premium service countries:	94 (YouTube Music Premium) 95 (YouTube Premium)	117

== Former or defunct services ==
- Amazon Music storage, started in March 2009, offered storage space for 250 uploaded tracks (MP3 or AAC up to 100 MB each) in free version or 250,000 tracks in premium version, as well as web players for major operating systems, Fire TV, Roku, and Sonos sound systems. Amazon did not allow podcasts, ringtones, or audiobooks to be uploaded. Amazon started phasing out cloud storage from December 2017.
- Best Buy Music Cloud debuted in June 2011 to unfavourable reviews.
- Google Play Music Music locker, store, and streaming service debuted in May 2011, and shut down October 2020. Google has replaced Play Music with YouTube Music.
- Groove Music by Microsoft debuted in 2015, linking Microsoft's Groove music player to OneDrive cloud storage. It allowed storing up to 5 GB of music in AAC, MP3 and WMA formats. Playback was possible on devices running Windows, iOS or Android as well as Xbox game consoles.
- Lala started in 2006, was purchased by Apple, and shut down on May 31, 2010.
- MP3tunes started in late 2005, fought major record labels in Capitol Records, Inc. v. MP3Tunes, LLC, and closed in 2012 after filing for Chapter 7 bankruptcy.
- mSpot Music started in May 2010, was purchased by Samsung, and shut down on October 15, 2012.
- My.MP3.com started in January 2000, fought major record labels in UMG v. MP3.com, and the service was discontinued by a new owner.
- Samsung Music Hub was only available for a few Samsung devices and was retired on 1 July 2014.
- Style Jukebox, debuted in September 2012, offered up to 2 TB of music storage (10 GB in the trial period) and music players for the common operating systems, and supported all major file formats incl. high-resolution audio. The service was discontinued in December 2017.
- Ubuntu One only included music features (web and mobile app playback, 20 GB storage) with the paid plan. The service was shut down on 1 June 2014.

== See also ==
- Comparison of digital music stores
- Comparison of music streaming services
- List of music software
- List of Internet radio stations
- List of online music databases
