= Black Lab Linux =

- Developer: Black Lab Linux team
- OS family: Linux (Unix-like)
- Working state: Discontinued
- Source model: Mixed
- Latest release: 11.60 / March 9, 2018; 8 years ago
- Latest preview: 2015.09 / September 14, 2015; 10 years ago
- Supported platforms: x86-64
- Kernel type: Monolithic (Linux)
- Default user interface: Xfce
- License: Various
- Official website: www.blacklablinux.org

Black Lab Linux is a discontinued free software Linux distribution for x86 and x86-64 hardware. It was first released in November 2013 by PC/OpenSystems LLC. Black Lab Linux is based on Ubuntu Linux tailored both for general desktop use and for the more technical user. It is commercially made available by PC/OpenSystems LLC for business desktops, education facilities, as well as parallel computing.

== History ==
Formerly known as OS/4, the product was renamed by Roberto J. Dohnert and the software team to Black Lab Linux after the USPTO denied his trademark application for OS/4. PC/OpenSystems LLC had acquired the rights to the name Black Lab Linux in 2008 after the acquisition of Terrasoft Solutions by Fixstars. In its current incarnation, Black Lab Linux does not share any code or platform similarities with Terrasoft Solutions' product called Black Lab Linux as Terrasoft Solutions's release was for the PowerPC Processor. Fixstars Linux's products, Yellow Dog Linux and Y-HPC, are currently developed under the Yellow Dog Linux brand.

Upon the purchase of the Linspire intellectual properties from Bridgeways, Inc. in 2018, PC/OpenSystems LLC discontinued Black Lab Linux in favor of Linspire and Freespire.
