= Digital Cornerstone =

Open source software company

- Formerly: Lindows, Inc. (2001–2004); Linspire, Inc. (2004–2008)
- Type: Semi-independent subsidiary
- Industry: Software
- Founded: August 2001; 25 years ago in San Diego, California, U.S
- Founder: Michael Robertson
- Defunct: 2008
- Fate: Acquired by Xandros, Inc
- Headquarters: San Diego, California, United States

Digital Cornerstone (formerly known as Lindows, Inc. (2001–2004) and Linspire, Inc. (2004–2008)) was a Linux and open source software company based in San Diego, California. It primarily targeted desktop computers with its flagship Linux distribution, Linspire. It was bought in 2008 by Xandros, Inc., a former competitor, and made a semi-independent subsidiary of the company.

== As Lindows ==
Lindows, Inc. was founded in August 2001, by Michael Robertson with the goal of developing a Linux-based operating system capable of running major Microsoft Windows applications. It based its Windows compatibility on the Wine API compatibility layer. The company later abandoned this approach in favor of attempting to make Linux applications easy to download, install and use. To this end a program named "CNR" was developed: based on Debian's Advanced Packaging Tool, it provides an easy-to-use graphical user interface and a slightly modified package system for an annual fee. The first public release of Linspire was version 1.0, released in late 2001.

== Relationship with Microsoft ==
In 2002, Microsoft sued Lindows, Inc. claiming the name "Lindows" constituted an infringement of their "Windows" trademark. Microsoft's claims were rejected by the court, which asserted that Microsoft had used the term "windows" to describe graphical user interfaces before the Windows product was ever released, and that the windowing technique had already been implemented by Xerox and Apple Computer many years before. Microsoft sought a retrial and after this was postponed in February 2004, offered to settle the case. As part of the licensing settlement, Microsoft paid an estimated $20 million, and Lindows, Inc. transferred the Lindows trademark to Microsoft and changed its name to Linspire, Inc.

On June 13, 2007, Linspire and Microsoft announced an interoperability collaboration agreement with a focus on: document format compatibility, instant messaging, digital media, web search, and patent covenants for Linspire customers. This agreement has been criticised, most notably by the Groklaw website for being disingenuously short-lived and limited, and against the spirit of the GNU General Public License. Kevin Carmony, in one of the regular "Linspire Letters," asserted that the agreement would "bring even more choices to desktop Linux users [and] ... offer a "better" Linux experience."

== Under Carmony ==
On June 15, 2005, Michael Robertson stepped down as CEO of Linspire, Inc. He continued as Chairman and was replaced as CEO by Kevin Carmony.

On February 8, 2007, Linspire, Inc. and Canonical Ltd, the lead sponsor and developer of the Ubuntu operating system, announced plans for a new technology partnership, with Linspire aiming to "begin basing ... [their] desktop Linux offerings on Ubuntu."

On July 10, 2007, Linspire released Linspire 6.0 based on Freespire 2.0.

Carmony resigned from Linspire on July 31, 2007. He was succeeded by Larry Kettler as CEO.

== Acquisition ==
On July 1, 2008, a minority of Linspire stockholders elected to change the company's name to Digital Cornerstone, and all assets were acquired by Xandros.
