= Capitol Records, LLC v. ReDigi Inc. =

US District Court case concerning copyright infringement

- Court: United States District Court for the Southern District of New York
- Full case name: Capitol Records, LLC v. ReDigi Inc.
- Decided: March 30, 2013
- Docket nos.: 1:12-cv-00095
- Citations: 934 F. Supp. 2d 640; 106 U.S.P.Q.2d 1449

Case history
- Subsequent actions: Affirmed, 910 F.3d 649 (2d Cir. 2018).

Holding
- Partial summary judgment for plaintiff Capitol Records was granted, with the court finding that the first-sale doctrine does not apply to digital resale.

Court membership
- Judge sitting: Richard J. Sullivan

Keywords
- Copyright, Copyright infringement, Fair use, First-sale doctrine

Capitol Records, LLC v. ReDigi Inc., 934 F. Supp. 2d 640 (S.D.N.Y. 2013), is a case from the United States District Court for the Southern District of New York concerning copyright infringement of digital music. In ReDigi, record label Capitol Records claimed copyright infringement against ReDigi, a service that allows resale of digital music tracks originally purchased from the iTunes Store. Capitol Records' motion for a preliminary injunction against ReDigi was denied, and oral arguments were given on October 5, 2012.

The ReDigi case raised the novel issue of whether digital music purchases are eligible for resale under the first-sale doctrine. On March 30, 2013, Judge Richard J. Sullivan ruled in favor of Capitol Records, explaining that the transfer of digital data from one storage medium to another constituted a violation of copyright, because the copy was ultimately an unauthorized reproduction, and therefore outside of the protection of the first-sale doctrine.

ReDigi appealed to the Second Circuit. Oral argument was on August 22, 2017, and the court issued a decision on December 12, 2018. Again the copyright holders won, on the theory that it is impossible to transfer any digital file from a user's storage medium without making a copy that is controlled by copyright's ongoing "reproduction right", as opposed to the "distribution right" that is extinguished by the First Sale doctrine.

== Background ==
ReDigi is an ongoing online marketplace that has operated since October 2011, allowing users to buy or sell music files that are verified to be legally obtained. In order to participate in the ReDigi marketplace, users must subscribe on the ReDigi website, then download and install the marketplace application.

In the litigation with Capitol Records, ReDigi claimed that their Atomic Transaction feature allowed the transfer of music files between users without having to copy the file, thereby circumventing copyright issues.

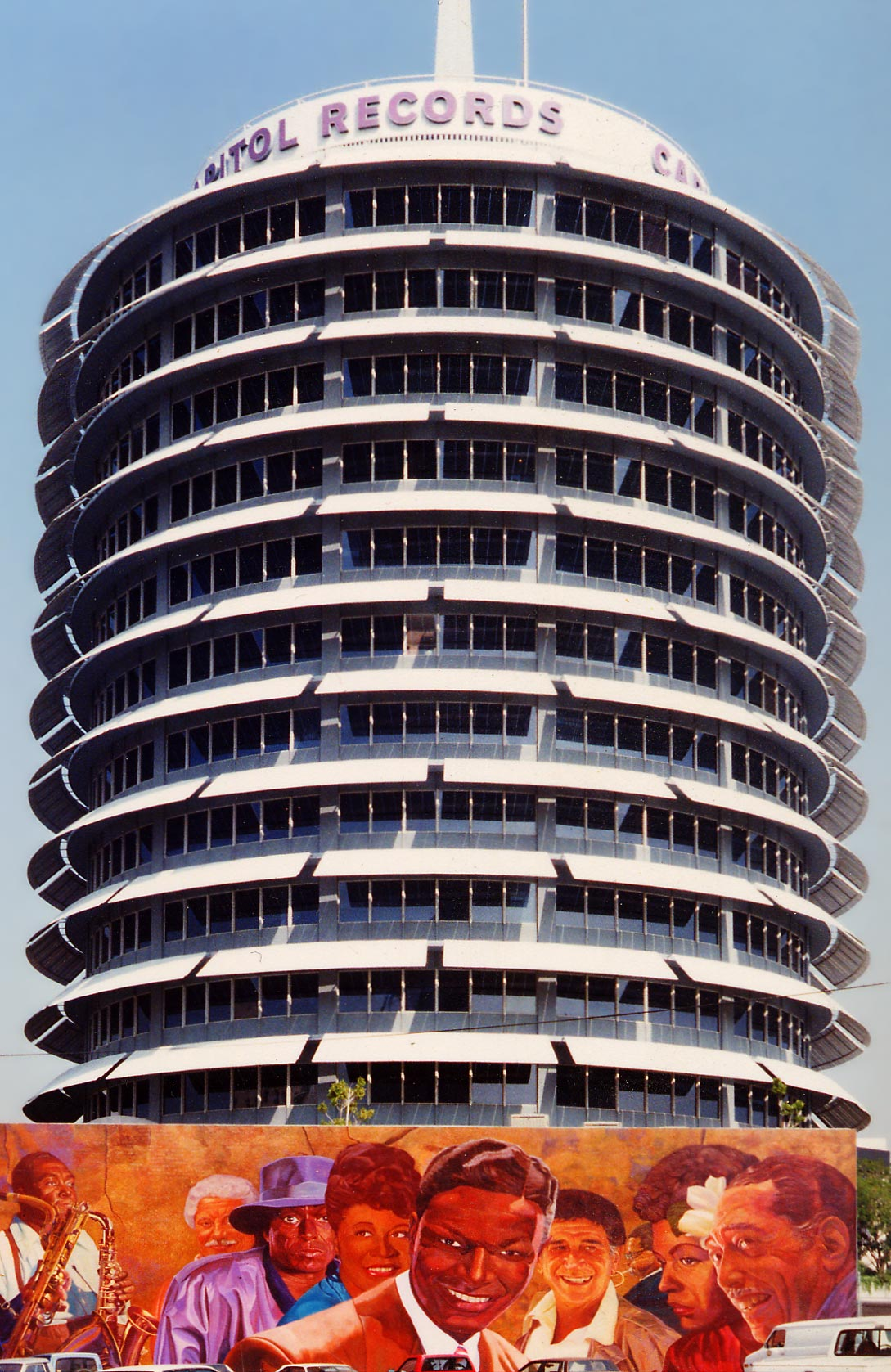
Capitol Records Tower, Los Angeles, California

=== Capitol Records' Complaint ===
In its complaint, Capitol Records claimed that ReDigi was liable for direct copyright infringement, contributory copyright infringement, vicarious copyright infringement, and inducement of copyright infringement. Capitol Records argued that ReDigi constructed their business model without authorization to copy recording materials. Capitol Records also mentioned that ReDigi also provided 30-second clips on their marketplace without authorization. Specifically, Capitol Records argued for copyright infringement by claiming that copies of music files were made during the initial transmission to ReDigi servers and during the transactions between users. Capitol Records ultimately claimed $150,000 of damages per infringement.

=== ReDigi's Answer ===
ReDigi argued that the initial transmission of the music files to the servers was protected by the essential step defense, and that the transactions trigger modifications to the files to be reassigned to the purchasing users, such that the files on the server are modified in-place, rather than copied.

=== Amicus Curiae Briefs by Google & Public Knowledge ===
Judge Sullivan denied Google's and Public Knowledge's attempts to file amicus curiae briefs, reasoning that the parties were fully capable of raising the issues mentioned in the information briefs themselves as part of their arguments. In its brief, Google claimed to have a vital interest in the case, citing that if Capitol Records prevailed, then it would put the entire cloud computing industry, worth an estimated 41 billion dollars, at risk. However, because the amicus was denied, Google's opinion proved to be immaterial.

== Capitol Records' Motion for Preliminary Injunction ==
On January 27, 2012, Capitol Records filed a motion for preliminary injunction against ReDigi, primarily claiming irreparable harm. In its defense, ReDigi pointed out that its transaction records were detailed enough for damages calculations, thereby undermining Capitol Records' claimed burden and irreparable harm.

On February 6, 2012, Judge Sullivan denied Capitol Records' motion for preliminary injunction, allowing ReDigi to continue its online services. The preliminary injunction was denied because, as Judge Sullivan reasoned, the case only involved monetary damages, and that irreparable harm was not shown to warrant an injunction because ReDigi maintained careful records of all transactions for damages to be easily calculated if Capitol Records prevailed in the case.

== Judgment on Motion for Partial Summary Judgment ==
On March 30, 2013, Judge Sullivan granted partial summary judgement for Capitol's "claims for ReDigi's direct, contributory, and vicarious infringement of its reproduction rights." Because ReDigi did not involve the actual physical copy being transferred but a new copy of the digital file, the court rejected the first-sale doctrine defense. The court reasoned that Capitol's reproduction right was violated when a new copy was created, thereby barring the defense of the first-sale doctrine.

=== Infringement of Capitol's Reproduction Rights ===
ReDigi argued that the process of uploading a lawfully bought music file to the Internet for sale through ReDigi's service was not a reproduction under the Copyright Act, because the file never existed in two places simultaneously. Under ReDigi's uploading architecture, as pieces of the music file are uploaded by the seller to ReDigi's servers, the very same pieces are erased from the seller's own hard drive, and scans are performed to ensure no other copies exist on the seller's computer. However, the court did not find ReDigi's argument persuasive. Instead, the court reasoned that the plain text of the Copyright Act made it clear that a copyright holder's right of reproduction is infringed "when a copyrighted work is fixed in a new material object." The court referred to the definition of "sound recordings" under Section 106(1) of the Copyright Act, which are "works that result from the fixation of a series of musical, spoken, or other sounds."

The court distinguished "sound recordings" from "phonorecords," which are the "material objects in which sounds . . . are fixed by any method now known or later developed" (emphasis in original). The court reasoned that the reproduction right "is the exclusive right to embody, and to prevent others from embodying, the copyrighted work (or sound recording) in a new material object[.]" Because it is physically impossible to transfer the original material object over the internet, "the embodiment of a digital music file on a new hard disk is a reproduction within the meaning of the Copyright Act." The court held that reproduction occurs regardless even if the sound recording is being simultaneously deleted from the original material object, because the dictionary definition of "reproduction" includes "to cause to exist . . . anew," not just to cause another existence. The court explained that, "the fact that a file has moved from one material object [the user's computer] to another [the ReDigi server] means that a reproduction has occurred."

The court distinguished this case from cases where chemicals were used to lift images off greeting cards and placed on plaques for resale, because no new material object was created in a chemical lifting. The court explained that, in those cases, the original copyright print was physically lifted off and transferred to a ceramic tile, and no new material object was therefore created.

=== Infringement of Capitol's Distribution Rights ===
ReDigi did not dispute that distribution of Capitol's works occurred on its website, only that such distributions were protected by fair use and first sale (discussed below).

=== Infringement of Capitol's Performance and Display Rights ===
Capitol alleged ReDigi infringed its exclusive rights because of streaming thirty-second song clips and displaying album art to potential buyers, but ReDigi countered that it acted within a licensing agreement by promptly redirecting users from the preview clips to a different source. Because there was not enough evidence on the record, the court denied Capitol's claim of performance and display rights infringement.

=== ReDigi's Affirmative Defenses ===
Because the court held that ReDigi legally infringed Capitol's exclusive rights of reproduction and distribution, ReDigi's only way of avoiding liability was through an affirmative defense. The court rejected all of ReDigi's defense arguments, which involved the first sale and fair use doctrines.

==== First-Sale Doctrine Defense ====
The first-sale defense is a common law principle derived from Bobbs-Merrill Co. v. Straus (1908) and codified in Section 109(a) of the Copyright Act. The first-sale doctrine provides that a copyright owner "exhausts his exclusive statutory right to control its distribution" once he or she has sold the copyrighted item. In ReDigi, the court held that the first-sale defense did not apply to ReDigi because first-sale only affects the copyright holder's distribution right, not reproduction right. Since ReDigi was held to have violated Capitol's reproduction right, the court reasoned that the first-sale defense did not protect ReDigi from liability for unauthorized reproduction.

Moreover, because ReDigi was not distributing a user's original phonorecord, but rather transmitting a new embodiment of the sound recording "reproduced" from the user's hard drive, the court found that ReDigi could not claim the first-sale defense. The court explained that, "[h]ere, a ReDigi user owns the phonorecord that was created when she purchased and downloaded a song from iTunes to her hard disk. But to sell that song on ReDigi, she must produce a new phonorecord on the ReDigi server. Because it is therefore impossible for the user to sell her “particular” phonorecord on ReDigi, the first-sale statute cannot provide a defense."

In addition, ReDigi argued that "technological change has rendered its literal terms ambiguous, the Copyright Act must be construed in light of [its] basic purpose," which is designed to "promot[e] broad public availability of literature, music, and the other arts." The court found this argument unpersuasive, reasoning that "while technological change may have rendered Section 109(a) unsatisfactory to many contemporary observers and consumers, it has not rendered it ambiguous." As part of its reasoning, the court looked to a report by the U.S. Copyright Office, which declined to extend first-sale protection to the distribution of digital works, because digital works compete perfectly with original copies, whereas physical copies "degrade with time and use, making used copies less desirable than new ones." The court ultimately deferred to Congress, stating that "[i]t is left to Congress, and not this Court, to deem [first-sale's applicability to digital works] outmoded."

==== Fair Use Doctrine Defense ====
The court held that ReDigi's use of Capitol's works was "well outside the fair use defense." The four fair use factors come from 17 U.S.C. § 107 and are:

1. The purpose and character of the use, including whether such use is of a commercial nature or is for nonprofit educational purposes;
2. The nature of the copyrighted work;
3. The amount and substantiality of the portion used in relation to the copyrighted work as a whole; and
4. The effect of the use upon the potential market for or value of the copyrighted work.

Balancing each of these factors, the court held that each weighed against ReDigi (See fair use). Particular judgments on each of the four factors are outlined below:

1. Purpose and Character of Use

As for the first factor, the court held that "[p]lainly, the upload, sale, and download of digital music files . . . does nothing to 'add something new, with a further purpose or different character' to the copyrighted works."

2. Nature of the Copyrighted Work

As for the second factor, the court held that creative works such as sound recordings are "close to the core of the intended copyright protection."

3. Portion of the Work Copied

In terms of the third factor, the court explained that ReDigi's business depended on transmitting works in their entirety, "negating any claim of fair use." (But see Bill Graham Archives v. Dorling Kindersley, holding that the reproduction of an entire Grateful Dead poster in a book was fair use despite the appropriation of the entire work).

4. Effect Upon the Potential Market

As for the fourth fair use factor, the court held that ReDigi's sales were likely to undercut the market or value of Capitol's works, because the products sold on ReDigi's market were indistinguishable from "legitimate primary market save for its lower price."

=== Liability Analysis ===
After determining that infringement had occurred, the court addressed liability separately.

==== Direct Infringement ====
The court held ReDigi directly liable for infringement. Direct liability requires that a defendant must have "engaged in some volitional conduct" showing active violation of the plaintiff's copyright. The court reasoned that since ReDigi created a system where the only music files eligible for sale were copyrighted and purchased from iTunes, and that ReDigi programmed its software to do so, there was enough of a volitional act for ReDigi to be held for direct infringement.

==== Contributory Infringement ====
In contrast to direct infringement, "[c]ontributory infringement occurs where 'one . . . with knowledge of the infringing activity, induces, causes or materially contributes to the infringing conduct of another.'" The court had "little difficulty" in holding that ReDigi knew or should have known its business would encourage infringement. Moreover, because it found ReDigi contributorily liable, the court did not reach Capitol's inducement claim.

The court cited evidence from ReDigi's website, including advertisements that its service was legal, despite other published materials which warned otherwise. ReDigi also claimed to have researched the law on this issue, arguing that such research helped it understand whether its service would result in infringement.

Reasoning that ReDigi provided the "site and facilities" for direct infringement, the court also held ReDigi materially contributed to its users' infringement.

===== Sony Betamax Defense =====
The court also held that ReDigi's service did not qualify for the Sony safe harbor, because according to the Sony case, a service or product must be "capable of substantial noninfringing uses," and ReDigi's service may only be used to infringe copyrighted works.

==== Vicarious Infringement ====
Vicarious liability for copyright infringement exists where the defendant "has the right and ability to supervise the infringing activity and also has a direct financial interest in such activities." In ReDigi, the court held ReDigi vicariously liable because it "exercised complete control over its website's content, user access, and sales," and financially benefited from every sale due to its 60% transaction fee.

== Subsequent developments ==
ReDigi appealed the decision.

The court of appeals generally upheld the district court's findings, ruling against ReDigi in December 2018.

Within a week after the preliminary injunction was denied, Rdio, provider of album art and sound snippets for ReDigi and licensee of Capitol Records, stopped providing ReDigi with such content, a move seen by ReDigi as Capitol Records' attempt to cripple ReDigi's services. As a result, ReDigi turned to YouTube for sound snippets.

In Europe, a similar case, UsedSoft GmbH v. Oracle International Corp., was decided by the European Court of Justice in July 2012 to affirm the resale of used software licenses.

== Commentary ==
Copyright scholars closely followed ReDigi because it directly addressed the question of the applicability of the first-sale doctrine to the digital realm. Some of the broader implications of ReDigi and its surrounding issues were whether copyright law and the first-sale doctrine were to be read in such narrow legal technicalities, eviscerating the doctrine from the digital realm altogether. Other scholars have raised the issue of whether a lack of a first-sale doctrine destroys a potential right of inheritance. Moreover, other commentators have suggested a re-balancing of copyright interests to amend the Copyright Act in order to incorporate a resale royalty system. At least one writer has compared ReDigi to the Star Trek transporter, and argued against a formalistic reading of first-sale in the digital realm. Additionally, some scholars and trade associations submitted amicus briefs to the court, including the Copyright Alliance, Association of American Publishers (AAP), Motion Picture Association of America (MPAA), and Recording Industry Association of America (RIAA).

== See also ==
- Fair use doctrine
- First-sale doctrine
- Capitol Records v. Deborah Foster
- Capitol Records, Inc. v. MP3Tunes, LLC
- Quality King Distribs., Inc. v. L'anza Research Int'l, Inc.
- Kirtsaeng v. John Wiley & Sons, Inc.
- Vernor v. Autodesk, Inc.
- Hachette v. Internet Archive
