= Presidential Ambassadors for Global Entrepreneurship =

Advisory group

Presidential Ambassadors for Global Entrepreneurship (PAGE) was a collaborative advisory group created by former United States President Barack Obama tasked with creating entrepreneurial growth in America.

PAGE was founded by then United States President Barack Obama in 2014. The prime focus of the group was to increase the business startup culture in the United States.

In 2016, Theranos CEO Elizabeth Holmes stepped down as one of the ambassadors of the program due to a federal investigation into some of her activities.

Other ambassadors for PAGE include former AOL CEO Steve Case, Venture for America founder and 2020 presidential candidate Andrew Yang, Shark Tank investor and founder of FUBU, Daymond John, who was appointed to his post in 2015, Mozilla board member Julie Hanna and Helen Greiner (co-founder of iRobot Corporation). Hanna and Greiner were two of the five women who were named ambassadors of PAGE at the time.

In 2018, Inaugural PAGE member and Chairman and CEO of Pinnacle Group, Nina Vaca had a day named after her in Houston, Texas due to her efforts in improving the Hispanic and immigrant community in Texas.
