= Pentium Centrino =

Pentium Centrino may refer to:

- Pentium M, the Intel microprocessor
- Centrino, the combination of Intel Pentium M, 855 and PRO/Wireless chipsets
