= Intel PRO/Wireless =

Series of Intel wireless products

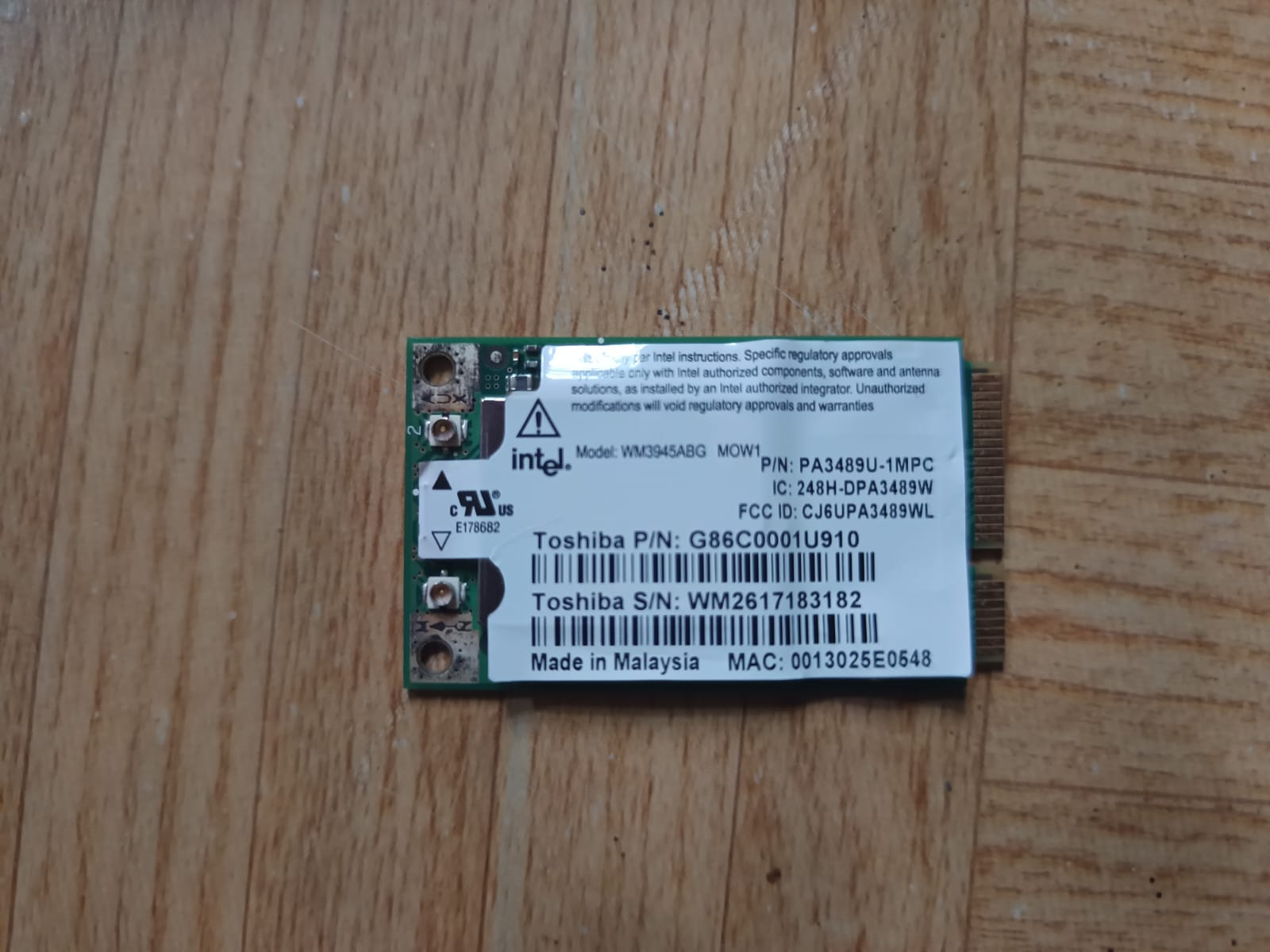
Intel WM3945ABG MOW1 took from Toshiba Tecra A6 laptop, made in Malaysia, manufactured in 2006.

Intel PRO/Wireless is a series of wireless products developed by Intel. These products include wireless network adapters, access points, and routers that are designed to provide high-speed wireless connectivity for computers, laptops, and other devices. Intel PRO/Wireless products use various wireless technologies, including Wi-Fi (IEEE 802.11) and Bluetooth, to provide wireless connectivity. Intel PRO/Wireless network adapters allow devices to connect to wireless networks, while access points and routers create wireless networks that devices can connect to.

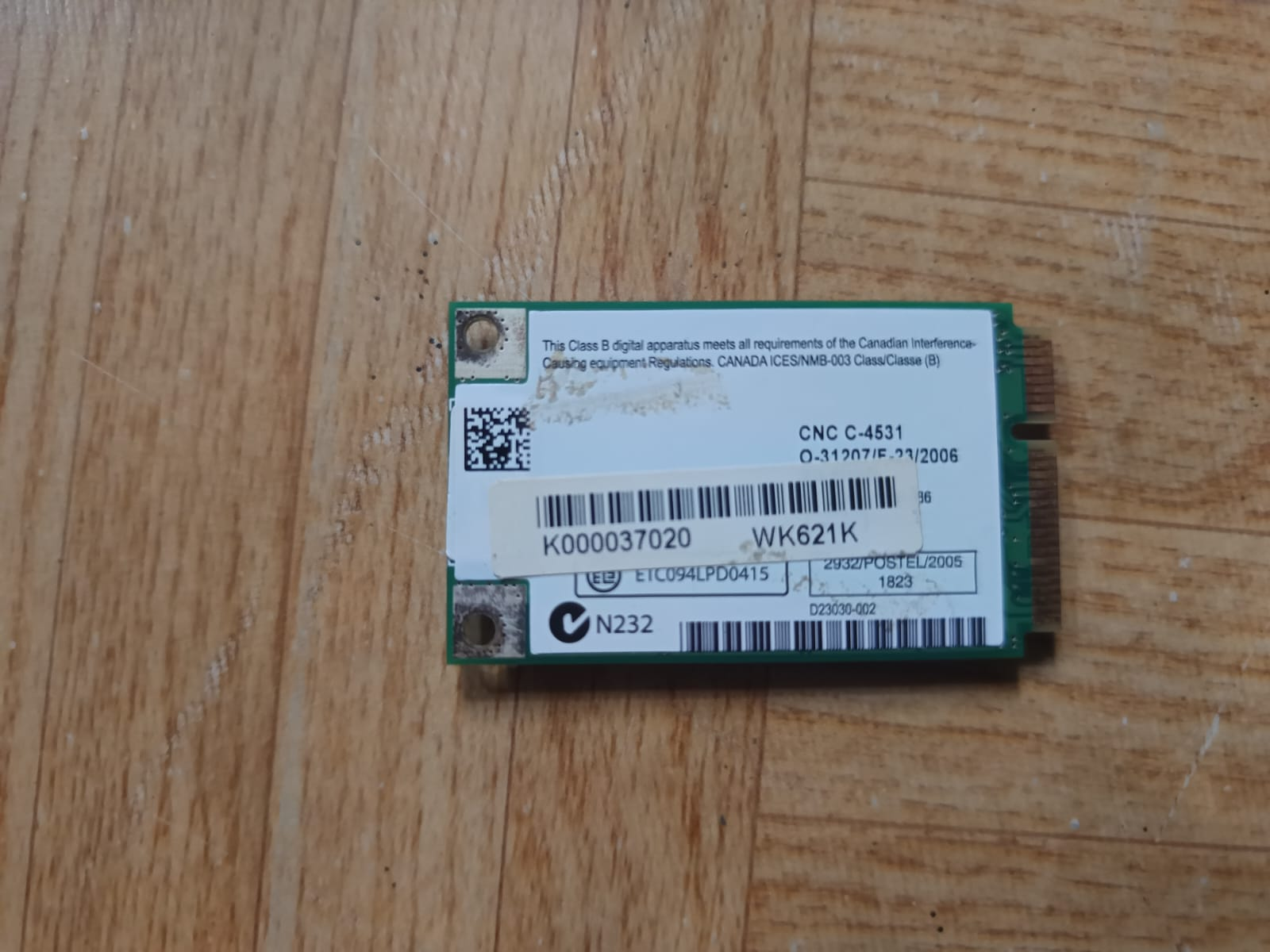
Intel WM3945ABG MOW1 took from Toshiba Tecra A6 laptop, made in Malaysia, manufactured in 2006.

Intel PRO/Wireless products are commonly used in homes, offices, and other settings where wireless connectivity is desired. They are known for their high performance and reliability, and are often used in business environments where a reliable wireless connection is critical. Intel PRO/Wireless products are also used in some public places, such as airports, hotels, and coffee shops, where they can be used to provide wireless access to the Internet for travelers and other patrons.

== History ==
After the release of the wireless products called Intel Pro/Wireless 2100, 2200BG/2225BG/2915ABG and 3945ABG in 2005, Intel was criticized for not granting free redistribution rights for the firmware necessary to be included in the operating systems for the wireless devices to operate. As a result of this, Intel became a target of campaigns to allow free operating systems to include binary firmware on terms acceptable to the open-source community. Linspire-Linux creator Michael Robertson outlined the difficult position that Intel was in releasing to open source, as Intel did not want to upset their large customer Microsoft. Theo de Raadt of OpenBSD also claimed that Intel is being "an Open Source fraud" after an Intel employee presented a distorted view of the situation on an open-source conference. In spite of the negative attention Intel received as a result of the wireless dealings, the binary firmware still has not gained a license compatible with free software principles.

== Hardware ==
Model name	Supported 802.11 protocols	Form factor
PRO/Wireless 2011B	b	PC-Card
PRO/Wireless 2100	b	Mini PCI
PRO/Wireless 2100A	ab	Mini PCI
PRO/Wireless 2200BG	bg	Mini PCI
PRO/Wireless 2915ABG	abg	Mini PCI
PRO/Wireless 3945ABG	abg	Mini PCIe
PRO/Wireless 4965AGN	abgn	Mini PCIe
PRO/Wireless 5100AGN / 5300AGN	abgn	Mini PCIe

The successor to the PRO/Wireless series is Intel Wireless WiFi Link.

== See also ==
- Comparison of open-source wireless drivers
- FIPS 140
- Wireless LAN
