= Scalix =

- Scalix Web Access
- Developer: Scalix Inc.
- Stable release: 12.7 / February 23, 2018; 8 years ago
- Operating system: Linux
- Platform: x86-64 (64-bit)
- Type: Groupware
- License: Scalix Public License
- Website: www.scalix.com

Scalix is an e-mail and groupware server that runs on Linux, licensed under the Scalix Public License (SPL).

The software provides e-mail, group calendaring and other collaborative software, which are standard in groupware. It can also be accessed from many different clients, most notably Microsoft Outlook, Novell and Evolution (formerly Ximian). It also has an AJAX-based web email and calendaring client named Scalix Web Access.

== Background ==
The software was released by Scalix Corporation and founded by Julie Hanna in 2002, during her tenure as an Entrepreneur In Residence (EIR) at Mayfield Fund. The company was funded by venture firms New Enterprise Associates (NEA), Mohr Davidow Ventures (MDV) and Mayfield Fund. The code is based on the earlier HP OpenMail product, which was licensed from Hewlett-Packard.

In 2006, Scalix had thousands of customers for a total of over a million mailboxes. A majority of customers were migrating away from legacy software like Microsoft Exchange and Lotus Notes.

In July 2007, the company was purchased by Xandros and in July 2011 sold to Sebring Software Inc, a collaborative integration software company offering on-premises and cloud solutions.

On November 11, 2013, a press release announced a management buy-out and the concurrent release of version 12.0.

== Software license ==
The Scalix Public License is based on the Mozilla Public License (MPL); the modifications have not been approved by the Open Source Initiative. The SPL adds an appendix (exhibit b) to the MPL requiring that any products derived from Scalix source code display a "Scalix" logo that links back to the Scalix website, and a copyright notice states that it must be "in the same form as the latest version of the Covered Code distributed by Scalix at the time of distribution of such copy".

== Status ==
Scalix struggled to release the latest version with a maintenance update, announced for Q4/2011, and a major release, announced for Q1/2012, not being released. After a three-year wait, the next major release of Scalix, version 12, was released on November 11, 2013, with support included for Outlook 2010 and 2013.

== See also ==
- HP OpenMail
- Samsung Contact
- SOGo
- Tine 2.0
- Zarafa Collaboration Platform
- Zentyal
- Zimbra Collaboration Suite
