= Capitol Records, Inc. v. Foster =

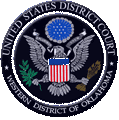
- Court: United States District Court for the Western District of Oklahoma
- Full case name: Capitol Records, Inc., et al. v. Debbie Foster and Amanda Foster
- Decided: July 13, 2006
- Docket nos.: 5:04-cv-01569
- Citation: 2006 WL 4558154

Case history
- Subsequent actions: Attorneys' fees awarded, 86 U.S.P.Q.2d 1203, 86 U.S.P.Q.2d 1208 (W.D. Okla. 2007)

Court membership
- Judge sitting: Lee Roy West

Capitol Records, Inc. v. Foster, 5:04-cv-01569 (W.D. Okla. 2006), is a notable case involving intellectual property and file sharing/distribution of music. The case involves the Recording Industry Association of America (RIAA) filing a lawsuit against an Oklahoma woman, Deborah Foster, in November 2004. Proclaiming her innocence, she fought the allegations and eventually had the charges dismissed with prejudice in July 2006.

== Case Details ==
Foster was originally sued in November 2004 after someone using an IP address assigned to an Internet account in her name was discovered with a shared folder available on a file-sharing network. Foster admitted that she owned the account; however, she insisted ignorance concerning the existence and use of file-sharing software. Foster did say that her adult daughter and estranged husband had access to the account, and may have been responsible for the infringement.

Instead of immediately dropping the case against Deborah Foster and suing those they believed were responsible for the alleged infringement, the plaintiffs amended the complaint to add her daughter Amanda Foster, while keeping Ms. Foster as a co-defendant. (The RIAA was granted a default judgment against Amanda Foster after she failed to answer the RIAA's complaint.) The RIAA told Foster that she was liable for any infringement regardless of whether she had shared or downloaded files herself because she was the registered owner of the account. Foster responded by filing a counterclaim for a "declaratory judgment of noninfringement."

A year and a half after initially filing suit (c. May 2005), the RIAA dropped their charges; however, Ms. Foster refused to drop her countersuit. In July 2006 a judge ruled that both the suit and countersuit be dropped; the latter since Ms. Foster was deemed to be the prevailing party in the matter. A major victory was achieved on February 7, 2007 with a ruling awarding Foster attorneys' fees from the matter.

Challenged over the attorney costs she claimed as a result of what might have been considered a malicious prosecution, Foster sought discovery of the RIAA's own legal rates as a comparative. It was ruled that these rates would be made available and taken into account as a factor (though not the sole factor) in judging reasonableness. Despite the objection of the RIAA, the judge ruled that the rates should be produced, citing the legal precedent that "a party cannot litigate tenaciously and then be heard to complain about the time necessarily spent by his opponent in response".

On July 16, 2007 a federal judge in Oklahoma awarded Foster $68,685.23 in attorneys' fees. Deborah Foster was represented by Warren W. Henson III and Marilyn Barringer-Thomson.

== See also ==
- Capitol Records, Inc. v. MP3Tunes, LLC
- Capitol Records, LLC v. ReDigi Inc.
