= Capitol Records, Inc. v. MP3Tunes, LLC =

2011 US legal case

- Court: United States District Court for the Southern District of New York
- Decided: August 22, 2011 (amended October 25, 2011)
- Docket nos.: 1:07-cv-09931

Case history
- Prior actions: Capitol Records, Inc. v. MP3Tunes, LLC, No. 07-9931 (S.D.N.Y. Aug 13, 2009).

Holding
- EMI's motion for summary judgement on its claim of contributory infringement for songs listed on EMI's takedown notice and not removed from the lockers is granted. EMI's motion for direct infringement by Robertson for the songs he personally loaded from unauthorized sites is granted. All other motions are denied. MP3tunes' motion for its defense under the DMCA safe harbor provisions is granted except with respect for the songs listed by EMI on the takedown notices and not removed. MP3tunes' all other motions are denied.

Court membership
- Judges sitting: William H. Pauley III (U.S. District Court Judge), Frank Maas (U.S. Magistrate Judge)

Keywords
- DMCA, Intellectual Property Law

Capitol Records, Inc. v. MP3tunes, LLC is a 2011 case from the United States District Court for the Southern District of New York concerning copyright infringement and the Digital Millennium Copyright Act (DMCA). In the case, EMI Music Group and fourteen other record companies (including Capitol Records) claimed copyright infringement against MP3tunes, which provides online music storage lockers, and MP3tunes's founder, Michael Robertson. In a decision that has ramifications for the future of online locker services, the court held that MP3tunes qualifies for safe harbor protection under the DMCA. However, the court found MP3tunes to still be liable for contributory copyright infringement in this case due to its failure to remove infringing songs after receiving takedown notices. The court also held that Robertson is liable for songs he personally copied from unauthorized websites.

== Background ==
In 2005, Michael Robertson founded MP3tunes, which operates two websites. The first, mp3tunes.com, offers personal online storage lockers for music. Users could upload music to their lockers from their computer hard drives, or from third party websites by providing an URL. The second website, sideload.com, is a search engine that finds and links to free music files on the internet. Sideload.com uses an index of websites known to host free music files, and the index is grown from the third party websites that mp3tunes.com users copy music from. When users find free music using sideload.com, they are given the option to "sideload" those files into their lockers at mp3tunes.com. Robertson and other MP3tunes executives have personal accounts with the website and actively sideload songs into their lockers. Additionally, MP3tunes retrieves and displays album cover art from Amazon.com under a license agreement.

In September 2007, MP3tunes received a takedown notice from EMI Music Group that identified 350 infringing songs and unauthorized websites. EMI demanded that in addition to the list items, MP3tunes must "remove all of EMI's copyrighted works, even those not specifically identified." In response to the notice, MP3tunes removed the unauthorized websites from its link index, but did not remove the infringing songs from users' lockers. MP3tunes took no action regarding works not specified in the notice except to ask EMI for further identification, which EMI declined to give. In November 2007, EMI filed suit for copyright infringement against MP3tunes and Robertson.

== Decision of the court ==
Both parties moved for summary judgment, which the court in this decision granted in part and denied in part.

=== DMCA safe harbor ===
MP3tunes claimed protection under the DMCA safe harbor provisions, which conditionally shield online service providers (OSPs) from liability for copyright infringement. To qualify for protection, the OSP must, among other requirements, implement a policy of terminating users who are repeat infringers, comply with takedown notices, not have actual or "red flag" knowledge of infringement, and not directly benefit from infringement when the OSP has control over the infringing activities. EMI argued that MP3tunes fails these four requirements; the court mostly disagreed, holding that MP3tunes is generally eligible for safe harbor protection. However, MP3tunes is not protected for the infringing songs identified in EMI's takedown notice that it failed to remove from its users' lockers. The court's analysis is detailed below.

==== Repeat infringer policy ====
EMI alleged that because MP3tunes did not terminate users who had sideloaded infringing music from unauthorized websites, MP3tunes was not executing an adequate repeat infringer policy. The court disagreed, holding that because users could not know whether the source of their music files is infringing or not, the users who sideloaded music for personal use do not constitute repeat infringers. Furthermore, the court found MP3tunes' existing repeat infringer policy, under which MP3tunes terminated 153 users who illegally shared music, to be adequate for safe harbor requirements.

==== Compliance with takedown notices ====
EMI claimed that MP3tunes failed to comply with the takedown notices by not removing infringing songs from users' lockers, and by not removing infringing links to other EMI works not on the list. MP3tunes claimed that per the decision in Viacom v. YouTube, it was only obligated to remove the infringing links specified by EMI.

The court agreed with MP3tunes that a takedown notice must list specific instances of infringement. However, the court also held that MP3tunes was obligated to remove the infringing songs from users' lockers, since MP3tunes tracked the source of each sideloaded file and could easily find files that were copied from the specified infringing links. In contrast, it would be impossible for EMI to externally identify the infringing songs in users' lockers in order to list them in a takedown notice.

==== Actual or "red flag" knowledge ====
EMI claimed that MP3tunes had actual and "red flag" knowledge of infringement because it listed songs from unauthorized websites, with its own executives sideloading songs from these websites. EMI asserted that the sites were obviously dedicated to copyright infringement, as shown by the association of these sites with words like "free", "MP3" and "file-sharing".

Because the sites in question were general-purpose, non-pirate-themed file-sharing and cyberlocker sites like RapidShare, the court disagreed, holding that there was no direct implication of infringing intent by their name or URL alone; that it would undermine the purpose of the DMCA to equate "free", "MP3", and "file-sharing" with piracy; and that MP3tunes was not obligated to go to these websites or otherwise investigate them further in order to determine their legitimacy.

==== Benefit and control of infringement ====
EMI claimed that MP3tunes directly benefited from its users' infringement and had the ability to control the infringing activities; the court again disagreed. The court found no direct benefit since MP3tunes' infringing and non-infringing users paid the same fee and because MP3Tunes doesn't promote infringement or reward users for it, and in fact punishes users for it.

Furthermore, the court held that MP3tunes' ability to monitor use or terminate accounts is merely an ability to control its own system, and not an ability to control infringement arising from users' activities and decisions. It further held that as a safe harbor, MP3tunes is not required to monitor use or prevent infringement; mere linking to infringing content, regardless of whether the links are user-supplied, doesn't create liability, at least not for what is otherwise a safe harbor: "If enabling a party to download infringing material was sufficient to create liability, then even search engines like Google or Yahoo! would be without DMCA protection. In that case, the DMCA's purpose—innovation and growth of internet services—would be undermined."

=== Copyright infringement ===
To bring a case of infringement, EMI had to present evidence of infringement, and that EMI owned copyrights for the disputed songs.

==== Evidence of infringement ====
MP3tunes asserted that EMI had no evidence of the actual acts of copying, only the existence of copies sideloaded from allegedly unauthorized distributors. The court rejected this view, holding that EMI's testimony and documents were sufficient to establish that copying had occurred, since they showed that MP3tunes lockers contained EMI-owned songs sideloaded from unauthorized distributors.

==== Copyright ownership and implicit authorization to distribute ====
MP3tunes asked the court to dismiss EMI's claims of ownership to songs registered as works-for-hire, alleging that the artists who created them were not EMI employees. MP3tunes further alleged that copyright was implicitly surrendered for songs that were made available for free download as part of EMI's "viral" marketing campaigns—campaigns which encouraged and authorized distribution from non-EMI-controlled sites, such as those where the songs were sideloaded from. In support of the latter claim, MP3tunes cited EMI executives' statements that it was difficult or impossible for users to know whether such content was infringing.

The court disagreed on all points. It held that EMI's claims for copyright registration declarations sufficiently establish ownership of copyright; if MP3Tunes suspects some of the work-for-hire registrations are bogus, the burden is on MP3Tunes to present evidence to support that claim. And it held that when making songs available as part of viral marketing campaigns, EMI placed certain restrictions on their use and distribution, so there was no implicit surrender of copyright nor an implicit authorization of any site not meeting those restrictions, such as the sites from which the songs were sideloaded—therefore, such sideloading was infringement, and the takedown notices for those files from those sites are valid. The inability of Internet users to distinguish between authorized and unauthorized distributors was considered irrelevant.

==== Secondary liability ====
Since MP3tunes failed to qualify for DMCA safe harbor protection for the EMI-identified infringing songs in its users' lockers, MP3tunes became liable for them. Accordingly, EMI's motion for summary judgement on its claim for contributory copyright infringement with respect to the songs listed in EMI's takedown notice was granted.

The court rejected MP3tunes' claim that removing "personal property" from users' lockers would result in lawsuits against the company; the court held that under the DMCA, such suits would have no standing.

==== Direct infringement ====
EMI claimed direct copyright infringement from Robertson and other MP3tunes employees sideloading infringing songs. The court stated that since there was no clear evidence that the MP3tunes employees infringed during their employment, summary judgement on this claim with respect to the employees was denied. On the other hand, because Robertson is a defendant in the case, he is directly liable, so summary judgement on this claim with respect to Robertson was granted.

EMI claimed that MP3tunes stored a "master copy" of a song on behalf of all users who had that song in their lockers. EMI alleged that the rebroadcasting of this master copy constituted an unauthorized public performance, asserting Cartoon Network, LP v. CSC Holdings, Inc. as guiding case law. The court rejected the applicability of that case because it did not involve an Internet service provider, and the court held that MP3tunes' utilization of "a standard data compression algorithm to eliminate redundant digital data" does not constitute the creation of a master copy. Thus, summary judgment on this claim was denied.

EMI further claimed infringement by unauthorized performance because MP3tunes made the sideloaded content "playable" via its website. The court vehemently disagreed, holding that such user access to content is no different than that provided by YouTube, exactly the kind of safe harbor the DMCA is designed to protect.

EMI claimed Amazon's license to MP3tunes does not permit cover art to be used in the way MP3tunes uses it, and is thus infringing. EMI asked the court to dismiss the claim. The court acknowledged both sides have conflicting claims requiring further adjudication, so no summary judgment was issued on this matter.

=== Unfair competition ===
EMI claimed that MP3tunes engaged in unfair competition by allowing EMI's works to be downloaded or otherwise experienced by users. MP3tunes asked for the court to dismiss the claim. The court stated that because MP3tunes has contributory liability, and because both it and EMI traffic in EMI-owned works to Internet users, EMI's claim of unfair competition for the identified works cannot be dismissed, and further adjudication is warranted, so no summary judgment was issued on this matter.

== Impact ==
This was a closely watched case by companies such as Google, Amazon, and Apple who are launching cloud music services, and in Google and Amazon's cases, without license agreements with the music industry. The decision in this case was viewed as "a victory for cloud music" and a first step in "[putting] music locker services on a solid legal foundation" for two main reasons. First, it established DMCA safe harbor protection for online locker services, potentially granting them "broad immunity from copyright liability". Second, it endorsed data deduplication, which allows cloud music services to more efficiently allocate storage and reduce the amount of space needed per user. This interpretation was welcomed by cloud music advocates after a previous ruling in Cartoon Network v. CSC Holdings had indicated that deduplication would make online lockers services liable for copyright infringement.

The case is also notable for being one of the first to suggest that the DMCA's notice-and-takedown provisions apply to sound recordings fixed prior to 1972, which are protected under common law copyright rather than the federal scheme encompassing the DMCA. Originally confined to a small footnote in the Court's initial decision, it was expanded to over two pages when plaintiff Capitol petitioned the court to reassess its conclusion on the issue. In an amended opinion, Judge Pauley held that while prior case law construing § 301(c) of the Copyright Act held that federal copyright protections do not preempt or limit common law rights in pre-1972 works, they also did not suggest that § 301(c) limits Congress's ability to grant immunity to qualified Internet service providers for the infringement of works fixed before 1972. More particularly, Pauley ruled that EMI's interpretation of § 301(c) as excluding pre-1972 recordings from the DMCA would eviscerate the purpose of the DMCA, and "[w]here an examination of the statute as a whole demonstrates that a party's interpretation would lead to 'absurd or futile results ... plainly at variance with the policy of the legislation as a whole,' that interpretation should be rejected."

== See also ==
- Capitol Records v. Deborah Foster
- Capitol Records, LLC v. ReDigi Inc.
