= Centrino =

Brand name by Intel

Components of the Centrino platform. From right, clockwise: Intel PRO/Wireless wireless network adapter, Intel mobile processor, Intel mobile southbridge chipset, and Intel mobile northbridge chipset.

Centrino was a brand name of Intel Corporation which represented its Wi-Fi and WiMAX wireless computer networking adapters. The brand name was first used by the company as a platform-marketing initiative. The change of the meaning of the brand name occurred on January 7, 2010. The Centrino name for laptops was replaced by the Ultrabook.

The old platform-marketing brand name covered a particular combination of mainboard chipset, mobile CPU and wireless network interface in the design of a laptop. Intel claimed that systems equipped with these technologies delivered better performance, longer battery life and broader wireless network interoperability than non-Centrino systems.

The product line name for Intel wireless products became Intel Centrino Wireless in 2010. The Centrino brand was ultimately discontinued in 2013.

== Intel Centrino ==
Wireless LAN	Chipset	Centrino	Processor	Codename	Release Date	Manufacturing Technology	Microarchitecture
Intel; Wireless; Products	800 Series	Carmel	Intel Pentium M	Banias	2003	130 nm	Intel P6
Intel; Wireless; Products	800 Series	Carmel	Intel Pentium M	Dothan	2004	90 nm	Intel P6
Intel; Wireless; Products	900 Series	Sonoma	Intel Pentium M	Dothan	2005	90 nm	Intel P6
Intel; Wireless; Products	900 Series	Napa	Intel Core Solo/Duo	Yonah	2006	65 nm	Intel P6
Intel; Wireless; Products	900 Series	Napa	Intel Core 2 Solo/Duo	Merom	2006	65 nm	Intel Core
Intel; Wireless; Products	900 Series	Santa Rosa	Intel Core 2 Solo/Duo	Merom	2007	65 nm	Intel Core
Intel; Wireless; Products	900 Series	Santa Rosa	Intel Core 2 Solo/Duo	Penryn	2008	45 nm	Intel Core
Intel; Wireless; Products	4 Series	Montevina	Intel Core 2 Solo/Duo	Penryn	2008	45 nm	Intel Core
Intel; Wireless; Products	5 Series	Calpella	Intel Core i7/i7 Extreme Edition	Clarksfield	2009	45 nm	Intel Nehalem
Intel; Wireless; Products	5 Series	Calpella	Intel Core i3/i5/i7	Arrandale	2010	32 nm	Intel Nehalem
Intel; Wireless; Products	6 Series	Huron River	Intel Core i3/i5/i7/i7 Extreme Edition	Sandy Bridge	2011	32 nm	Intel Sandy Bridge
Intel; Wireless; Products	7 Series	Chief River	Intel Core i3/i5/i7/i7 Extreme Edition	Ivy Bridge	2012	22 nm	Intel Sandy Bridge
Intel; Wireless; Products	8 Series	Shark Bay	Intel Core i3/i5/i7/i7 Extreme Edition	Haswell	2013	22 nm	Intel Haswell
Intel; Wireless; Products	9 Series	Crescent Bay	Intel Core M/i3/i5/i7	Broadwell	2014	14 nm	Intel Haswell
Intel; Wireless; Products	100 Series	Sunrise Point	Intel Core m3/m5/m7/i3/i5/i7	Skylake	2015	14 nm	Intel Skylake
Intel; Wireless; Products	200 Series	Union Point	Intel Core m3/i3/i5/i7	Kaby Lake	2016	14 nm	Intel Skylake

== Notebook implementations ==
=== Carmel platform (2003) ===
Intel used "Carmel" as the codename for the first-generation Centrino platform, introduced in March 2003.

Centrino	Carmel platform
Mobile chipset	an Intel Mobile 855 Express series chipset (codenamed Odem or Montara with Intel Extreme Graphics 2), including ICH4M southbridge.: RAM supported for PC-2100 (DDR-266) or PC-2700 (DDR-333) SO-DIMM.
Mobile processor	Processors - Socket 479: an Intel Pentium M (codenamed Banias) processor with a 400 MT/s FSB, or; an Intel Pentium M (codenamed Dothan) processor with a 400 MT/s FSB (after May 2004).
Wireless network	an Intel PRO/Wireless 2100B (codenamed Calexico) or later 2200BG mini-PCI Wi-Fi adapter (codenamed Calexico2).

Industry-watchers initially criticized the Carmel platform for its lack of support for IEEE 802.11g, because many independent Wi-Fi chip-makers like Broadcom and Atheros had already started shipping 802.11g products. Intel responded that the IEEE had not finalized the 802.11g standard at the time of Carmel's announcement. In early 2004, after the finalization of the 802.11g standard, Intel permitted an Intel PRO/Wireless 2200BG to substitute for the 2100. At the same time, they permitted the new Dothan Pentium M to substitute for the Banias Pentium M. Initially, Intel permitted only the 855GM chipset, which did not support external graphics. Later, Intel allowed the 855GME and 855PM chips, which did support external graphics, in Centrino laptops.

Despite criticisms, the Carmel platform won quick acceptance among OEMs and consumers. Carmel could attain or exceed the performance of older Pentium 4-M platforms, while allowing for laptops to operate for 4 to 5 hours on a 48 W-h battery. Carmel also allowed laptop manufacturers to create thinner and lighter laptops because its components did not dissipate much heat, and thus did not require large cooling systems.

=== Sonoma platform (2005) ===
Intel used Sonoma as the codename for the second-generation Centrino platform, introduced in January 2005.

Centrino	Sonoma platform
Mobile chipset	an Intel Mobile 915 Express series chipset (codenamed Alviso with Intel GMA 900), including ICH6M southbridge.: RAM supported for PC2-4200 (DDR2-533) SO-DIMM.
Mobile processor	Processors - Socket 479: an Intel Pentium M (codenamed Dothan) processor with a 533 MT/s FSB.
Wireless network	an Intel PRO/Wireless 2200BG or 2915ABG mini-PCI Wi-Fi adapter (both codenamed Calexico2).

The Mobile 915 Express chipset, like its desktop version, supports many new features such as DDR2, PCI Express, Intel High Definition Audio, and SATA. Unfortunately, the introduction of PCI Express and faster Pentium M processors causes laptops built around the Sonoma platform to have a shorter battery-life than their Carmel counterparts; Sonoma laptops typically achieve between 3.5–4.6 hours of battery-life on a 53 W-h battery.

=== Napa platform (2006) ===
The codename Napa designates the third-generation Centrino platform, introduced in January 2006 at the Winter Consumer Electronics Show. The platform initially supported Intel Core Duo processors but the newer Core 2 Duo processors were launched and supported in this platform from July 27, 2006 onwards.

Centrino	Napa platform
Mobile chipset	an Intel Mobile 945 Express series chipset (codenamed Calistoga with Intel GMA 950), including ICH7M southbridge.: RAM supported for PC2-4200 (DDR2-533) and PC2-5300 (DDR2-667) SO-DIMM.
Mobile processor	Processors - Socket M / Micro-FCBGA: an Intel Core Solo, Core Duo (codenamed Yonah) processor, or; an Intel Core 2 Duo (codenamed Merom) processor with a 667 MT/s FSB for Napa Refresh platform, or; an Intel Core 2 Solo (codenamed Merom) processor with 533 MT/s FSB for Napa Refresh platform (Sept 2007).
Wireless network	an Intel PRO/Wireless 3945ABG mini-PCIe Wi-Fi adapter (codenamed Golan).: Some newer models (as of 1st quarter 2007) of the Napa Refresh platform contain the newer 4965AGN (a/b/g/draft-n) wireless cards.

Intel uses Centrino Duo branding for laptops with dual-core Core Duo processors and retains the Centrino name for laptops with single core (Core Solo) processors. Some of the initial Core Duo laptops are still labeled as Intel Centrino rather than Centrino Duo.

=== Santa Rosa platform (2007) ===
The codename Santa Rosa refers to the fourth-generation Centrino platform, which was released on May 10, 2007.

Centrino	Santa Rosa platform
Mobile chipset	an Intel Mobile 965 Express series chipset (codenamed Crestline): GM965 with Intel GMA X3100 graphics technology or PM965 with discrete graphics, and ICH8M southbridge, 800 MT/s front side bus with Dynamic Front Side Bus Switching to save power during low utilization.: Intel Dynamic Acceleration (IDA), better Windows Vista Aero support.; RAM supported for PC2-4200 (DDR2-533) and PC2-5300 (DDR2-667) SO-DIMM. Runs DDR2-800 SO-DIMMs at 667 MHz even though an 800 MT/s front side bus is supported.; EFI-compliant firmware, a successor to BIOS.; optional NAND flash-memory caching branded as Intel Turbo Memory (codenamed Robson).; Ethernet LAN controller 82562V (codenamed Ekron-N) or Gigabit Ethernet LAN controllers 82566MM and 82566MC (codenamed Nineveh).
Mobile processor	Processors - Socket P / Socket M / Micro-FCBGA: an Intel Core 2 Duo (codenamed Merom) second generation processor with 800 MT/s FSB, or; an Intel Core 2 Duo (codenamed Penryn) 45 nm processor with 800 MT/s FSB and SSE4.1, which will add 47 new instructions to SSSE3. It was scheduled for release in January 2008 for Santa Rosa Refresh platform.
Wireless network	an Intel WiFi Link 4965AGN (a/b/g/draft-n) mini-PCIe Wi-Fi adapter (codenamed Kedron).: Wireless-N technology boasts a 5X speed increase, along with a 2X greater coverage area, and supports 2.4 GHz and 5 GHz signal bands, with enough bandwidth for high definition audio and video streams.

The Santa Rosa platform comes with dynamic acceleration technology, allowing single threaded applications to execute faster. When a single threaded application is running, the CPU can turn off one of its cores and overclock the active core. In this way the CPU maintains the same Thermal Profile as it would when both cores are active. Santa Rosa performs well as a mobile gaming platform due to its ability to switch between single threaded and multithreaded tasks. Other power savings come from an Enhanced Sleep state where both the CPU cores and the chipset will power down.

The wireless chipset update was originally intended to include WWAN Internet access via HSDPA (3.5G), (codenamed Windigo) co-developed with Nokia. After announcing a working partnership, both later retracted the deal citing the lack of a clear business case for the technology. Support for WiMAX (802.16) was originally scheduled for inclusion in Santa Rosa but was later delayed until Montevina in 2008.

It is branded as "Centrino Pro" when combined with the enhanced security technologies Intel introduced with vPro and "Centrino Duo" when they are not used.

=== Montevina platform (2008) ===
The codename Montevina refers to the fifth-generation Centrino platform, now formally named Centrino 2 to avoid confusion with previous Centrino platforms. It was scheduled for release at Computex Taipei 2008, which took place on June 3–7, 2008, but was delayed until July 15, due to problems with integrated graphics and wireless certification.

Centrino	Montevina platform
Mobile chipset	an Intel Mobile Express series 4 chipset (codenamed Cantiga; GL40, GS45, GM45, PM45) with Intel GMA X4500 graphics technology and ICH9M southbridge, 1066 MT/s (667 MT/s for GL40) FSB. The GM45/GS45 graphics core is clocked at 533 MHz and 400 MHz for GL40, which contains ten unified shaders, up from the eight provided by GMA X3100.: RAM support for PC2-5300 (DDR2-667), PC2-6400 (DDR2-800), PC3-6400 (DDR3-800), PC3-8500 (DDR3-1066) SO-DIMM. (GL40 does not support DDR3-1066); NAND flash-memory caching branded as Intel Turbo Memory (codenamed Robson 2).; Gigabit Ethernet LAN controllers 82567LM and 82567LF (codenamed Boazman).; Main support for DisplayPort with an external connector attached to the motherboard along with full supplemental support of HDMI, DVI, and VGA standards.
Mobile processor	Processors - Socket P / Socket M / Micro-FCBGA: a second-generation Intel Core 2 Duo (codenamed Penryn) 45nm processor with 800-1066 MT/s FSB with clock speeds ranging from 2 GHz to 3.06 GHz, also featuring SSE4.1 support, which adds 47 new instructions to SSSE3. It was planned to consume no more than 29W, compared to Merom's and first-generation Penryn's 34W TDP. But after release only a few models (P series) have 25W TDP and the rest (T series) still have 35W TDP, besides the Q series (Quad core) TDP is 45W.
Wireless network	Wireless Modules: Intel WiMAX/WiFi Link 5350 mini-PCIe (codenamed Echo Peak-P) supporting both WiMAX and up to 450 Mbit/s Wi-Fi, or; Intel Ultimate N WiFi Link 5300 mini-PCIe adapter (codenamed Shirley Peak 3x3) supporting up to 450 Mbit/s, or; Intel WiMAX/WiFi Link 5150 mini-PCIe adapter (codenamed Echo Peak-V) supporting both WiMAX and up to 300 Mbit/s Rx / 150 Mbit/s Tx Wi-Fi, or; Intel WiFi Link 5100 mini-PCIe adapter (codenamed Shirley Peak 1x2) supporting up to 300 Mbit/s Rx / 150 Mbit/s Tx

It is branded as "Centrino 2 vPro" when combined with built-in security and manageability features technologies.

=== Calpella platform (2009) ===
The codename Calpella refers to the sixth-generation Centrino platform. Though originally scheduled to premiere in Q3 2009 with the second iteration of Nehalem processors, Intel had stated that due to pressure from computer manufacturers, they would delay the release of the platform until at least October 2009 (Q4 2009) to allow OEM partners to clear excess inventory of existing chips. This was believed to be spurred by the lowered demand due to unfavorable economic conditions throughout 2009.

Centrino	Calpella platform
Mobile chipset	an Intel Mobile Express Series 5 chipset (PCHM codenamed Ibex Peak) with Intel HD Graphics technology that will allow for optimized decoding/encoding and editing/playback of H.264/MPEG-4 AVC video used in Blu-ray Discs and HD 1080p video, optimized for MPEG-2 (DVD) video playback and editing.: Integrated memory controller and integrated PCI express controller remove the need for a northbridge and the older FSB technology.; Direct connect to DisplayPort with DPCP as with its predecessor along with legacy support for HDMI (and HDCP), DVI, and VGA.; RAM supported for PC3-6400 (DDR3-800), PC3-8500 (DDR3-1066), PC3-10600 (DDR3-1333) and PC3-12800 (DDR3-1600) SO-DIMM.; Gigabit Ethernet LAN controllers 82577LM and 82577LF (codenamed Hanksville).; Solid-state drive or Hybrid hard drives support.; ~~Second generation Intel Turbo Memory solid-state cache (codenamed Braidwood)~~, canceled.
Mobile processor	Processors, based on Intel Nehalem microarchitecture: an Intel Core i7 Extreme processor (codenamed Clarksfield-XE) 45nm for Quad Core version, 55W TDP.; an Intel Core i7 processor (codenamed Clarksfield) 45nm for Quad Core version, 45W TDP.; an Intel Core i3/Core i5/Core i7 processor (codenamed Arrandale-SV contains 32nm Hillel and 45nm Ironlake) for Dual Core version, 35W TDP.; an Intel Core i7 processor (codenamed Arrandale-LV contains 32nm Hillel and 45nm Ironlake) for Dual Core version, 25W TDP.; an Intel Core i5/Core i7 processor (codenamed Arrandale-ULV contains 32nm Hillel and 45nm Ironlake) for Dual Core version, 18W TDP.
Wireless network	Wireless Modules: Intel Centrino Ultimate-N 6300 AGN mini-PCIe adapter (codenamed Puma Peak 3×3), or; Intel Centrino Advanced-N + WiMAX 6250 AGN mini-PCIe adapter (codenamed Kilmer Peak), or; Intel Centrino Advanced-N 6200 AGN mini-PCIe adapter (codenamed Puma Peak 2×2), or; Intel Centrino Wireless-N 1000 BGN mini-PCIe adapter (codenamed Condor Peak)

=== Huron River platform (2011) ===
The codename Huron River refers to the seventh-generation Centrino platform.

Centrino	Huron River platform
Mobile chipset	an Intel Mobile Express Series 6 chipset (PCHM codenamed Cougar Point).: Gigabit Ethernet LAN controllers 82579LM and 82579LF (codenamed Lewisville).
Mobile processor	Processors, based on Intel Sandy Bridge microarchitecture
Wireless network	Wireless Modules: Intel Centrino Ultimate-N 6300 AGN mini-PCIe adapter (codenamed Puma Peak 3×3), or; Intel Centrino Advanced-N + WiMAX 6250 AGN mini-PCIe adapter (codenamed Kilmer Peak 2x2), or; Intel Centrino Advanced-N 6205 AGN mini-PCIe adapter (codenamed Taylor Peak 2×2), or; Intel Centrino Advanced-N 6230 AGN mini-PCIe adapter with Bluetooth (codenamed Rainbow Peak 2×2), or; Intel Centrino Wireless-N + WiMAX 6150 BGN mini-PCIe adapter (codenamed Kelsey Peak 2x1), or; Intel Centrino Wireless-N 1030 BGN mini-PCIe adapter with Bluetooth (codenamed Rainbow Peak 2×1), or; Intel Centrino Wireless-N 1000 BGN mini-PCIe adapter (codenamed Condor Peak 2×1)

=== Chief River platform (2012) ===
The codename Chief River refers to the eighth-generation Centrino platform.

Centrino	Chief River platform
Mobile chipset	an Intel Mobile Express Series 7 chipset (PCHM codenamed Panther Point ): Gigabit Ethernet LAN controllers 82579LM and 82579LF (codenamed Lewisville).
Mobile processor	Processors, based on Intel Ivy Bridge microarchitecture
Wireless network	Wireless Modules: Intel Centrino Ultimate-N 6300; Intel Centrino Advanced-N 6235; Intel Centrino Advanced-N 6205; Intel Centrino Wireless-N 2230 (codenamed Jackson Peak); Intel Centrino Wireless-N 2200; Intel Centrino Wireless-N 135; Intel Centrino Wireless-N 105 (codenamed Canyon Peak)

=== Shark Bay platform (2013) ===
The codename Shark Bay refers to the ninth-generation Centrino platform.

Centrino	Shark Bay platform
Mobile chipset	an Intel Mobile Express Series 8 chipset (PCHM codenamed Lynx Point): Gigabit Ethernet LAN controllers I217LM and I217V (codenamed Clarkville).
Mobile processor	Processors, based on Intel Haswell microarchitecture
Wireless network	Wireless Modules Wilkins Peak

Jon Worrel predicted in 2012 that Shark Bay would comprise a single Multi-Chip Module (MCM) package.

== Mobile Internet Device ==
=== Menlow platform (2008) ===
On March 2, 2008, Intel introduced the Intel Atom processor brand for a new family of low-power processor platforms. The components have thin, small designs and work together to "enable the best mobile computing and Internet experience" on mobile and low-power devices.

Intel's second generation MID platform (codenamed Menlow) contains a 45 nm Intel Atom processor (codenamed Silverthorne) which can run up to 2.0 GHz and a System Controller Hub (codenamed Poulsbo) which includes Intel HD Audio (codenamed Azalia).

Centrino	Menlow platform
Mobile chipset	an Intel SCH (codenamed Poulsbo) with integrated GMA 500 graphics (PowerVR SGX 535 based)
Mobile processor	a 45 nm Intel Atom CPU (codenamed Silverthorne)
Wireless network	a wireless radio

This platform was initially branded as Centrino Atom but the logo was dropped in August 2008; the logo had caused confusion between laptop and MID with previous marketing of Centrino stating only Intel chipsets are being used. Hence MIDs will be branded as Atom to allow integration with other OEM chipsets for the low-end market.

=== Intel Centrino Wireless ===
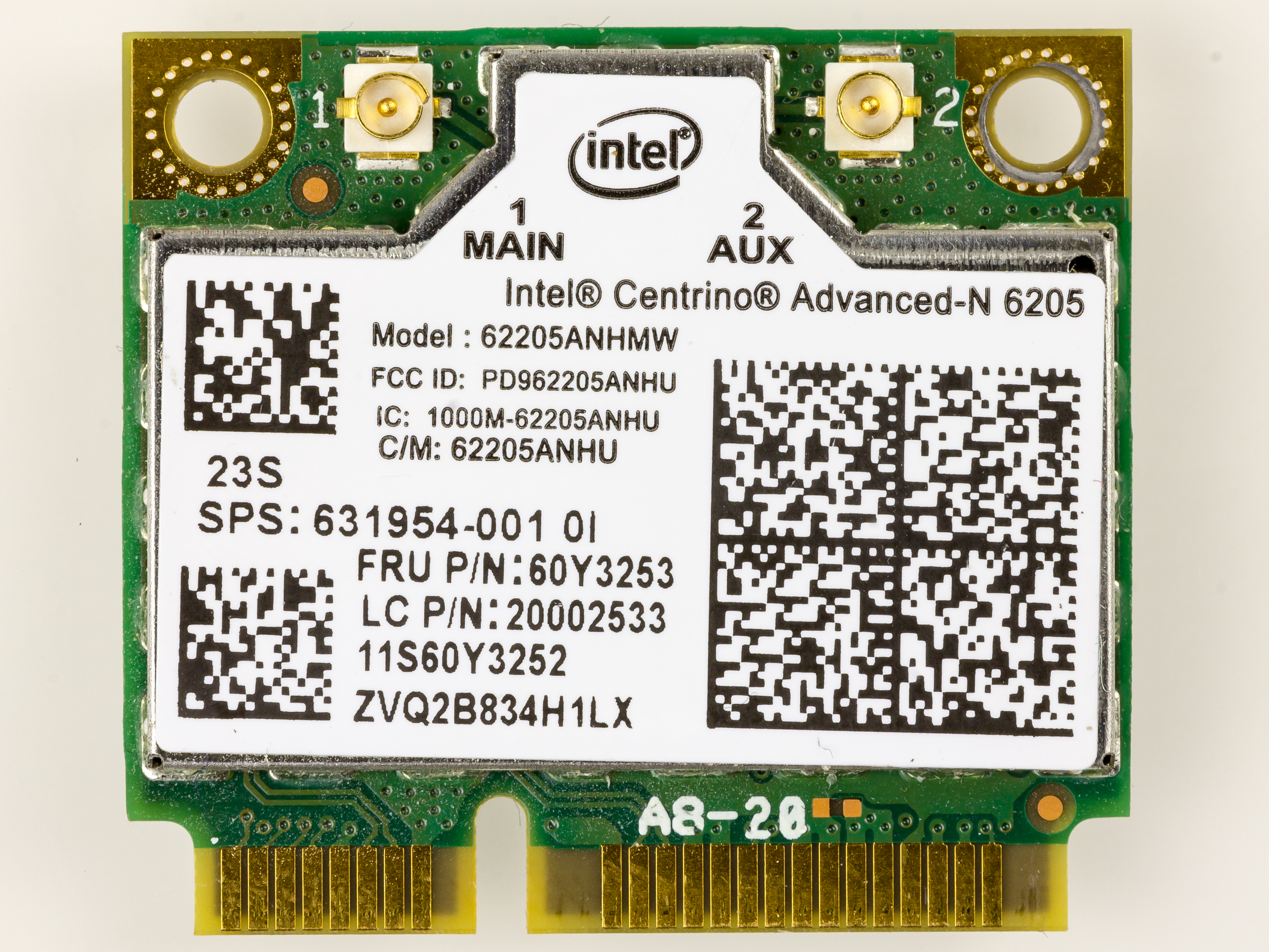
Intel Centrino Advanced-N 6205

Intel Centrino Wireless was the brand for Intel Wi-Fi and WiMAX adapters from 2010 to 2013. The product line included:

- Intel Centrino Wireless-N 1000
- Intel Centrino Advanced-N 6200
- Intel Centrino Ultimate-N 6300
- Intel Centrino Advanced-N + WiMAX 6250

== Centrino with Intel vPro technology ==
Laptops with Intel vPro technology have hardware features that allow a system administrator to remotely access wired and wireless laptops for maintenance and servicing if the operating system is unresponsive or crashed and, when a laptop is connected to AC power (not on battery power), allow a sys-admin to remotely access the laptop when the system is asleep or laptop power is off. It is targeted more for businesses than consumers.

- Centrino laptop with Intel vPro technology (Santa Rosa platform)
- Centrino 2 laptop with Intel vPro technology (Montevina platform)

=== Security technologies ===
Laptops with vPro have the typical dual-core or quad-core processor and wireless features of the Centrino family.

- The vPro technology built into the chipset adds management, security, and remote-deployment features for: monitoring laptops (protected event logs, access to BIOS settings, out-of-band alerting, protected data storage), maintaining and updating systems (access to protected system information, remote power up, console redirection), repairing systems (remote boot, console redirection, preboot access to BIOS settings, protected events logs), and securing systems (remote power up, hardware filters for network traffic, agent presence checks/triggers, out-of-band alerting).
- The 45 nm Centrino 2 package is based on the Penryn microprocessor and Q47/Q45 chipset. It includes a better graphics engine (integrated) than Centrino, and three key additional features: Transport Layer Security (TLS) secured communications over an open local area network (LAN) for wired laptops outside the corporate firewall (not supported for wireless states), support for Microsoft Network Access Protection (NAP), and support for out-of-band management and security features in Sx (all sleep states) when the laptop is inside the corporate firewall.

== See also ==
- Pentium M
- Intel Core
- Intel Core 2
- Intel Core i7
- Intel Evo
- List of Intel codenames
- AMD mobile platform

Centrino; 2003–2011	Succeeded by Ultrabook
