= Samsung Contact =

Email and groupware server

- Developer(s): Samsung SDS
- Operating system: Linux
- Type: Groupware

Samsung Contact was an enterprise email and groupware server that ran on Linux and HP-UX. It provided email, calendars and other collaborative software. It could be accessed from many different clients, most notably Microsoft Outlook. It was based on HP OpenMail, which was licensed from Hewlett-Packard.

== History ==
Hewlett-Packard announced the end of life for its HP OpenMail mail server in 2001. Samsung was one of the largest OpenMail customers with 250,000 users. and OEM for the software in Asia. In November 2001 Samsung Data Systems acquired an unlimited OEM license for the software, and its Reading, England-based developers, from HP.

Samsung SDS planned to make Contact, its name for OpenMail, its first enterprise product sold worldwide, and offered a temporary 90% discount in early 2002 for Contact 7.1. The company hoped to convert the five million current OpenMail users to Contact, and lure new customers using Microsoft Exchange, Lotus Domino, and Sun Microsystems's iPlanet. Later in 2002, Samsung intended to launch Contact 8.0 as a unified messaging platform including voicemail and instant messaging.

Following a major reorganization of Samsung SDS, most of the original core developers were laid off in 2003. Samsung Contact was discontinued at the end of 2007.

== See also ==
- Scalix
