= ReDigi =

Online marketplace for digital files

- Screenshot
- Website type: Secondhand digital media sales
- Website: redigi.com
- Commercial: Yes
- Registration: Optional
- Current status: Offline

ReDigi was an online marketplace for used digital music, eBooks, games, apps, and software. It claimed to be the only cloud storage service that verified whether each digital file uploaded for storage was legally acquired from an eligible source. ReDigi's Cloud and Marketplace only accepted lawfully purchased digital media. The service allowed users to buy and sell pre-owned digital content directly from one user to another. As of December 2020, the website was offline.

== History ==
ReDigi launched its public beta site in October 2011. It was founded by John Ossenmacher, along with his daughter, who had the idea of creating an online drop box where people could donate their unwanted digital media. Ossenmacher hired a team of programmers, mathematicians, business professionals, and legal advisors to build the service.

ReDigi filed voluntary petitions for Chapter 11 reorganization in United States bankruptcy court in August 2016. The company arranged multiple sources of funding to restructure its current debt and planned to exit its restructure in 2017.

Services currently offered include cloud storage for verifiable music, ebooks and other digital goods that were legally purchased, cloud streaming for listening to stored music, reading books, and utilizing other digital media, and buying and selling of used digital goods such as music, ebooks, games, apps and other digital media directly from other users on ReDigi.

=== Capitol Records lawsuit ===
In January 2012, Capitol Records sued ReDigi in New York Federal Court stating that Redigi was liable for contributing to copyright infringement demanding that ReDigi remove Capitol-owned material and pay $150,000 per track. On February 6, 2012, U.S. District Judge Richard Sullivan denied the preliminary injunction.

Vicarious liability for copyright infringement exists where the defendant "has the right and ability to supervise the infringing activity and also has a direct financial interest in such activities." In ReDigi, the court held ReDigi vicariously liable because it "exercised complete control over its website's content, user access, and sales," and financially benefited from every sale due to its transaction fee.

On March 30, 2013, the judge granted in part a summary judgment motion in favor of Capitol Records. The court stated:

ReDigi has vicariously infringed Capitol's copyrights" and found RediGi guilty of direct contributory infringement. ReDigi seeks judicial amendment of the Copyright Act to reach its desired policy outcome. However, "[s]ound policy, as well as history, supports [the Court's] consistent deference to Congress when major technological innovations alter the market for copyrighted materials. Congress has the constitutional authority and the institutional ability to accommodate fully the varied permutations of competing interests that are inevitably implicated by such new technology. Sony, 464 U.S. at 431. Such deference often counsels for a limited interpretation of copyright protection. However, here, the Court cannot of its own accord condone the wholesale application of the first sale defense to the digital sphere, particularly when Congress itself has declined to take that step.

On April 20, 2013, United States District Court, Southern District of New York has ruled that ReDigi is engaged in illegal activity. Judge Richard J. Sullivan wrote that "ReDigi has vicariously infringed" on copyrights and found ReDigi guilty of direct contributory infringement.

The 2nd Circuit Court of Appeals heard ReDigi's appeal on August 22, 2017. The American Library Association, the Internet Archive and twenty-four copyright law professors, backed ReDigi at appeal.

== Technology ==
ReDigi's technology is patented, and has additional patents pending. Features of the ReDigi system include:

- Creator syndication: the company launched "creator syndication" with its initial launch, providing a fan-based compensation system whereby creators receive a percentage of all sales for their works. Some creators receive greater compensation on a secondary sale than on its initial sale. Artist thoughts on secondary digital markets.
- Media Manager is an application that allows users to access ReDigi's cloud storage and sell digital goods such as music, ebooks, games, apps and other digital media. The application is designed to help users identify which of their media is legally eligible for cloud storage and resale, and help them organize and track media account activity including stored digital music, ebooks, games, apps and other digital media, pending sales, completed sales and purchases made on the marketplace.
- The Verification Engine is a tool used to analyze the user's digital libraries to determine which media are eligible for cloud storage and resale. The process is proprietary information to the company. Currently ReDigi only accepts verifiable, stored digital music, ebooks, games, apps and other digital media, that was legally purchased by the user on iTunes or ReDigi. Songs that were illegally obtained or ripped from a CD, for example, are not eligible.
- The Cloud: ReDigi's cloud service technology verifies all digital media uploaded for storage to ensure that the user legally obtained it. After migration to the cloud all secondary copies of the users digital music, ebooks, games, apps and other digital media, selected for cloud storage are removed from the user's library and synchronized devices, so that the only instance that exists is stored in the user's Cloud space on ReDigi. Users can keep their music in storage for streaming viewing, reading, playing, mobile listening, or to sell any of their stored digital music, ebooks, games, apps and other digital media in the Marketplace.
- The Marketplace: verified media stored on ReDigi's cloud are eligible for resale. The seller remains the owner of the media he/she has listed for sale on the marketplace until there is a buyer. When buyer and seller agree to a transaction, the media file and corresponding access and title are transferred from the seller to the buyer. The buyer becomes the new owner of the media file and the seller is no longer able to access it. ReDigi calls this patented process the "Atomic Transaction" as no copies of the music file are made during the transaction.
