= HP OpenMail =

HP OpenMail, also known simply as OpenMail, was an enterprise email messaging and collaboration product from Hewlett-Packard.

It was known for its ability to interconnect several other APIs and protocols, including MAPI, cc:Mail, SMTP and MIME, and was originally based on the OSI standards such as X.400. In addition to email, it also supported directory, public folder, and contact-management functionality.

It was notable for being supported not only on HP-UX, but also on IBM's AIX, Sun Microsystems' Solaris and Linux, which increased its attraction for enterprise customers. There were also lesser–used versions for SCO Unix, DG/UX, Ultrix and Windows NT.

== History ==
From the initial designs in 1987, OpenMail was primarily designed and developed at HP's now-demolished Pinewood offices, near Wokingham, England (also the home of OpenMail's predecessor product family, HP DeskManager and the original developers of HP NewWave).

HP said that as many as 15 million email accounts ran on OpenMail. The company stopped selling OpenMail to new customers in November 2001. HP subsequently twice licensed the source, allowing it to serve as the foundation for the Scalix and Samsung Contact products.
