= MSpot =

mSpot Inc. is the developer of Samsung Music Hub – an all-in-one mobile music service that includes a streaming catalog, cloud music storage, radio, and music store. The service was currently available for Samsung smart mobile devices in the U.S. and EU countries including the UK, France, Germany, Italy and Spain. mSpot became a wholly owned, independently operated subsidiary of Samsung Electronics, in May 2012: in July, 2013, mSpot employees became the Music Team for Samsung's Media Solutions Center.

mSpot was founded in 2004 by Daren Tsui and Ed Ho, now CEO and CTO respectively. The company was initially launched as a mobile radio service. In early 2005, Sprint was building the first 2.5 G network and requested mSpot to provide one of the first mobile radio channels for the first service. Initially the service launched with 8 music channels and 5 talk channels (NPR, Acuweather); and is soon expanded to provide sports and entertainment channels, including premium content channels like NPR, and sports. Soon after, mSpot launched a white-labeled mobile entertainment platform offering music and video content, which is later licensed by other wireless carriers including AT&T and T-Mobile.

In 2006, mSpot began offering full-length mobile movies that are streamed over wireless networks. Studios that first offered content for the service include Disney and Universal: Scarface is the first mobile movie offered on mSpot Movies, initially offered on Sprint.

In early 2008, Island Def Jam partnered with mSpot to bring label-sponsored radio to mSpot Radio. In May 2010, mSpot Music became one of the first "cloud" music services available in the U.S., ahead of Google Music and similar services from Apple and others.
