= Samsung Music Hub =

Music service by Samsung Electronics

Music Hub was a cloud-based music service launched by Samsung. It allowed users to listen to music from a variety of Samsung devices. According to its website, it wanted to create an integrated mobile and web service for listening to music.

== History ==
On May 9, 2012, mSpot published a press release, where it stated that it had been acquired by Samsung Electronics. This was followed by a subsequent press release noting the official launch of Music Hub by Samsung. Samsung Music shut down on July 1, 2014, which resulted in the dissolution of the Samsung Music Hub.

== Availability ==
Initially, the service was launched in Germany, France, Spain, Italy, and the UK. The service was available on the Samsung Galaxy S III and Samsung Galaxy Note II, with initial reports suggesting a wider launch was intended.

== Competition ==
Reports suggest that Samsung may have created the service in order to compete with other companies such as Google and Amazon in the cloud-based streaming music market. Some also note its similarity to other music services such as Spotify.

== See also ==
- Baidu Music
