= Julie Hanna =

- Born: August 5, 1965 (age 61); Sohag, Egypt
- Occupations: Executive Board Chair Kiva; Special Advisor X (formerly Google X), Alphabet's Moonshot Factory; Venture Partner, Obvious Ventures

Julie Hanna (born August 5, 1965) is an Egyptian-born technologist, entrepreneur, investor and board director. She is executive chair of Kiva, a peer-peer lending and crowdfunding company. She is a special advisor to X (formerly Google X), Alphabet's Moonshot Factory and a venture partner at Obvious Ventures.

In May 2015, President Barack Obama named Hanna Presidential Ambassador for Global Entrepreneurship “to help develop the next generation of entrepreneurs.”

She is a former board member of the Esalen Institute and Mozilla Corporation and a founding executive of five Silicon Valley technology companies.

Escaping civil war during Black September in Jordan in 1970, she grew up in the US and studied computer science at the University of Alabama at Birmingham.

== Early life and education ==
Hanna was born in Sohag, Egypt. She moved with her family to Irbid, Jordan, where they found themselves on the front lines of Black September, the Jordanian civil war. After fleeing a column of tanks firing on her school, the family escaped and made their way to Beirut, Lebanon. Shortly after arrival, the tensions that gave way to what would become the Lebanese civil war peaked. Hanna immigrated to the United States with her family in 1972, originally to New York, eventually settling in Springville, Alabama. She played Little League baseball in the wake of the passage of Title IX, becoming one of the first girls to break the gender barrier in sports.

Hanna graduated from the University of Alabama at Birmingham (UAB) with a B.S. in Computer Science. In 2007, she was named Outstanding Alumni by the UAB School of Natural Sciences and Mathematics, and in 2008, she was named UAB Distinguished Alumni of the Year and was the Graduation Commencement speaker speech republished here where she implored graduates to "be the entrepreneurs of their own life" drawing many parallels between the lessons learned from failure by successful Silicon Valley entrepreneurs and a person's life and career.

== Career ==
In 1992 Julie Hanna worked at Lotus Development in Mountain View, Calif., after their acquisition of cc:Mail where she worked on a next generation product strategy as part of the integration of the groupware firm with Lotus Notes. She joined Silicon Graphics to develop the first web-oriented product line for businesses in 1995 and then was recruited the following year with a group of SGI employees to help James Clark build Healtheon, (now WebMD) setting out to build an internet company that would revolutionize healthcare. In 1997 she became the founding VP of Product and Marketing for Portola Communications, developer of the internet's first high performance messaging system. Portola was acquired and she was instrumental in the negotiations to successfully sell the company which would become Netscape Mail. Hanna was founding VP Products and Marketing at onebox.com, founded by Bill Nguyen, acquired for $850 million in 1999 by Phone.com (later part of Openwave). She became an Entrepreneur-in-Residence at the Mayfield Fund venture firm in 2001 and then founded Scalix, an early commercial open source electronic mail and calendaring software company where she was chief executive until 2004. She has been on the board of directors of Esalen, Mozilla Corporation and Socialtext.

Hanna is special advisor to X (formerly Google X), Alphabet's Moonshot Factory and is Venture Partner at Obvious Ventures. She has been an early investor in several high growth technology companies, including Lyft, Lending Club, Bonobos (acquired by Walmart), and Return Path.

== Global entrepreneurship and impact ==
In May 2015, President Barack Obama named Hanna Presidential Ambassador for Global Entrepreneurship “to help develop the next generation of entrepreneurs in the U.S. and abroad.”

Since May 2009 Hanna has been Executive Chair of Kiva, a peer-to-peer micro-lending and crowdfunding company, whose vision is "a financially inclusive world where all people hold the power to improve their lives." Kiva has crowdfunded nearly $1.5 billion dollars reaching 3M micro-entrepreneurs in 80 countries, at a repayment rate of 97 percent. The Kiva crowdfunding platform has attracted a global community of citizen lenders across 190 countries.

In recognition of her vision and global impact on economic and social progress, Hanna was named the United States Woman Icon of APEC and is a recipient of the 2016 Global Empowerment Award.

Hanna was a member of the World Economic Forum Global Agenda Council on Humanitarian Response.

== Writing and speaking ==
Hanna speaks regularly on global entrepreneurship, purpose-driven profit, and the use of technology to address global challenges.

Hanna has published a variety of posts as a “LinkedIn Influencer” on LinkedIn. She is co-author, with Reid Hoffman, of "The World's Bank: How Crowdfunding is Disrupting Old Banking", an essay proposing that citizen lending and crowdfunding are transforming traditional banking.

Hanna spoke at TEDx where she discussed her experience as a war survivor, refugee and immigrant.
