= Xandros =

Linux distribution

Xandros Inc.
- Industry: Software industry
- Founded: May 2001; 25 years ago (by Linux Global Partners)
- Founders: Will Roseman, Dr. Frederick Berenstein
- Defunct: January 2018; 8 years ago
- Fate: bought by PC/Open Systems LLC
- Headquarters: New York City, U.S.
- Products: Xandros Desktop
- Website: xandros.com at the Wayback Machine (archived 2003-02-03)

Xandros Desktop
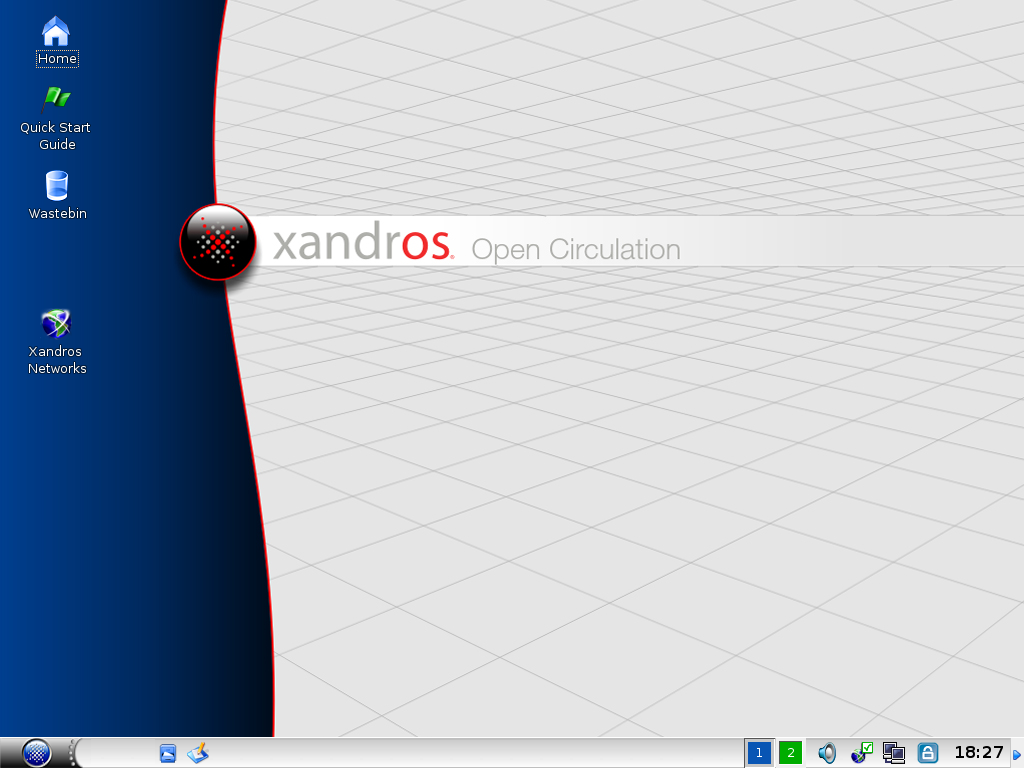
- Xandros Desktop 4.1 OCE
- Developer: Xandros Incorporated
- OS family: Unix-like
- Working state: Discontinued
- Source model: Open source mixed with closed source
- Latest release: 4.2 / July 26, 2007; 19 years ago
- Kernel type: Monolithic
- Default user interface: KDE
- License: GNU GPL with some proprietary software
- Official website: xandros.com at the Wayback Machine (archived 2003-02-03)

Xandros, Inc. was a software company which sold Xandros Desktop, a Linux distribution. The name Xandros was derived from the X Window System and the Greek island of Andros. Xandros was founded in May 2001 by Linux Global Partners (Will Roseman and Frederick Berenstein). The company was headquartered in New York City with its development office in Ottawa, Canada.

Xandros Desktop was based on Corel Linux, a Debian-based distribution that was acquired along with the development team behind the product from Corel Corporation in August 2001 after Corel decided to exit the Linux distribution market. Xandros was a founding member of the Desktop Linux Consortium and a member of the Interop Vendor Alliance.

In July 2007, Xandros bought Scalix, a Linux-based email and collaboration product, based on HP OpenMail. In July 2008, Xandros acquired Linspire.

In 2013, Xandros, Inc. changed its name to Bridgeways, Inc., and soon after, the Xandros website was taken offline. (The Xandros website was last updated in November 2009.) As a result, DistroWatch listed Xandros as discontinued.

On 1 January 2018, PC/OpenSystems LLC purchased Xandros and Linspire from Bridgeways, Inc., and resurrected the Xandros branding with Xandros OpenDesktop (a commercial release) and Xandros OpenServer (a free release), based on Ubuntu 20.04. Xandros OpenDesktop would later be rebranded as Xandros Enterprise Desktop, and Xandros OpenServer would be rebranded as Xandros Enterprise Server, and PC/OpenSystems also introduced free versions named Xandros Community Edition (using GNOME) and Xandros Developer Edition (using dwm).

== Products ==
Xandros made products for both the consumer and business markets. While the distributions included many packages licensed as free software and open-source, Xandros also included proprietary software developed in-house by the Xandros Corporation.

=== Commercial editions ===
==== Xandros Desktop Home Edition ====
This edition came with a 30-day trial of Crossover Office. It also included an "Applications CD" which includes extra programs which can be installed via Xandros Networks. As opposed to Home Edition Premium, the Home Edition did not include the photo manager, music manager, security suite, wireless profiles, or the ability to write to NTFS partitions.

==== Xandros Desktop Home Edition Premium ====
This edition came with a full version of Crossover Office Standard Edition, and a second CD (the "Applications CD") which included extra applications which could be installed via Xandros Networks. Despite its name, Xandros Desktop Home Edition Premium did not include a Xandros Networks Premium Membership.

Xandros Corporation offered a 30-day trial version of Xandros Home Edition Premium as a free download for evaluation purposes.

==== Xandros Desktop Professional ====
Formerly known as Xandros Desktop Business Edition, this edition was basically the same as Xandros Desktop Home Edition Premium, but it included the ability to authenticate to Windows PDC and Active Directory Domains, used PPTP VPN to connect remotely to the office, and used broadband wireless connectivity with 3G, GSM and UMTS support. Xandros Desktop Professional was officially released on 28 November 2006.

As with Home Edition Premium, Xandros Corporation also offered a 30-day trial version of Xandros Professional.

==== Presto ====
Introduced in 2009, Presto was a lightweight "instant-on" operating system which uses the lightweight Xfce 4.6 desktop environment. Similar to Canonical's Wubi installer for Ubuntu, it was installed inside of Microsoft Windows, with Windows XP as the earliest supported version. It also had access to an "application store" based on CNR, which was acquired through Xandros' acquisition of Linspire in mid-2008.

==== Xandros Moblin ====
In 2009, Xandros announced that it would develop a new netbook operating system based on Moblin v2.

=== Server systems ===
Xandros Desktop Management Server (xDMS) was available. It easily set up repositories as it deploys customized Xandros Desktop configurations across a large organization.

Xandros Server was designed to run on servers. It was officially launched at the 2006 LinuxWorld Conference and Expo in Toronto, on 25 April 2006, and officially released for purchase at the Xandros website on 1 May 2006, at a MSRP of US$450. Xandros Server 2.0 has been released in May 2007.

=== Previous editions ===
Xandros Open Circulation Edition (OCE) was a freely redistributable edition for non-commercial use, with a limited set of additional software. Soon after the 4.0 version was released as a DVD shrinkwrapped with Linux magazines, the torrent was pulled from Xandros' servers and all references to OCE removed from the Xandros website without explanation. Previous versions of Xandros OCE were generally released about 4 months after the release of the commercial versions.

Xandros Desktop OS Standard Edition was basically the same as the Open Circulation Edition, but it included full-speed CD/DVD burning. This product was replaced by Home Edition.

Xandros Desktop OS Deluxe Edition included an "applications CD" which included extra programs which could be installed via Xandros Networks. This product was replaced by Home Edition Premium.

Xandros Desktop OS Surfside Edition (branded and sold as Xandros SurfSide Linux) was basically the same as Xandros Desktop OS Standard Edition, however the Surfside Edition also included a Plantronics USB headset and 120 minutes of SkypeOut service.

According to DistroWatch, Xandros Desktop is discontinued. DistroWatch made the decision because no new official version or official updates to Xandros Desktop have been released since November 2006.

When Xandros purchased Linspire, they announced plans to retain Freespire as a Debian-based free community distribution and to base future editions of Xandros Desktop Professional – Home Edition and Home Edition Premium were to be discontinued – on Freespire. (This would be similar to the way Novell bases SUSE Linux Enterprise Desktop on their free openSUSE and to the way Red Hat bases Red Hat Enterprise Linux on their free Fedora.) However, according to one website, Xandros has discontinued Freespire. In addition, the DistroWatch website has added Freespire to its list of discontinued distributions.

== User interface ==
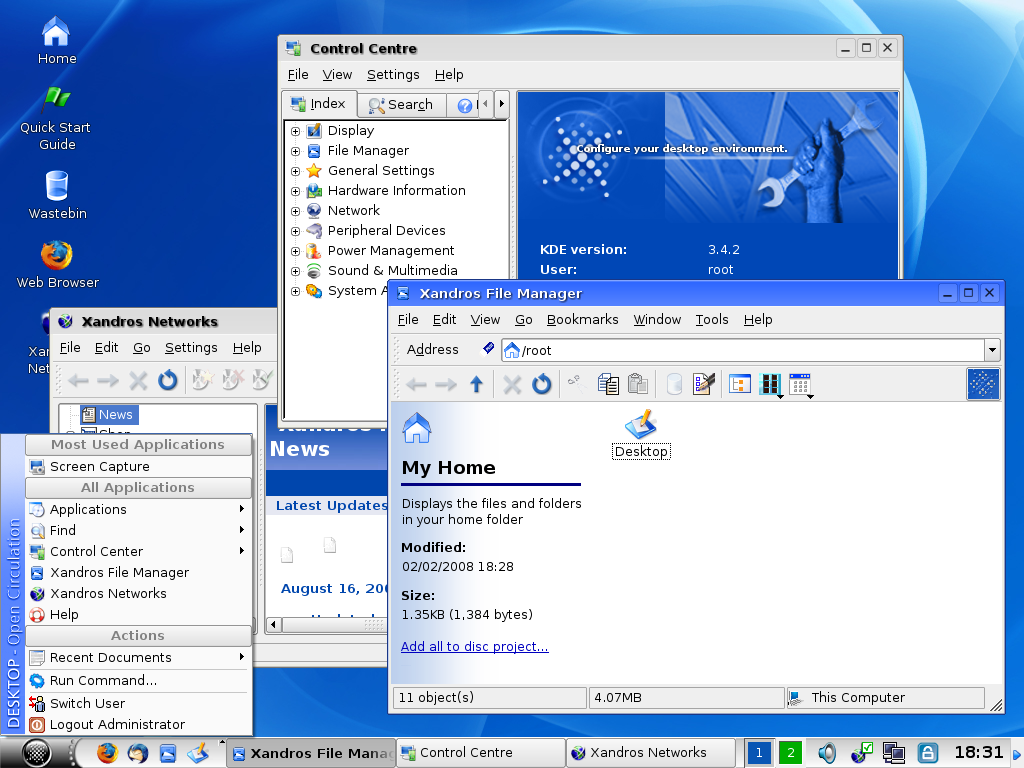
Xandros 4.1 OCE (KDE) running Xandros File Manager, Xandros Networks, Control Centre and the Xandros Launch Menu

The Xandros graphical user interface (GUI) used a modified version of KDE, which included replacing Konqueror with its own proprietary file manager called Xandros File Manager. It also used a package manager known as Xandros Networks, which handles installation of software. Installation of Xandros was done by a wizard that asks questions about partitioning and the administrator (root) password.

It was possible to install and use the GNOME and Xfce desktop environments on Xandros.

== BridgeWays for Microsoft Systems Center ==
In June 2007, a "broad collaboration agreement" between Xandros and Microsoft was announced. The agreement included "patent covenants, similar to the agreement that Microsoft reached with Novell."

In 2009, Xandros BridgeWays released the first of many Management Packs for Systems Center. The BridgeWays Management Pack Suite of products includes:

- VMware ESX virtualization and HyperV Extensions;
- JBoss, Apache, IBM WebSphere, Oracle WebLogic application development environments;
- Oracle, IBM DB2, MySQL database products;
- Apache web servers and more.

In 2010 BridgeWays is “Extending System Center”, by expanding the scope and market potential for Systems Center, with Windows, Linux, UNIX and VMware application environment monitoring. BridgeWays’ only focus is on building, selling and supporting Management Packs for System Center. See BridgeWays users can now track their alerts through System Center Service Manager 2010

BridgeWays does not compete with Microsoft. This group works closely with the Microsoft System Center R&D, Sales and Marketing teams to maximize value to System Center customers. In addition Xandros Bridgeways System Center resells direct and through its partner network of Distributors, ISVs, and SI MVPs worldwide as a contributing member of the System Center community.

== ASUS Eee PC ==
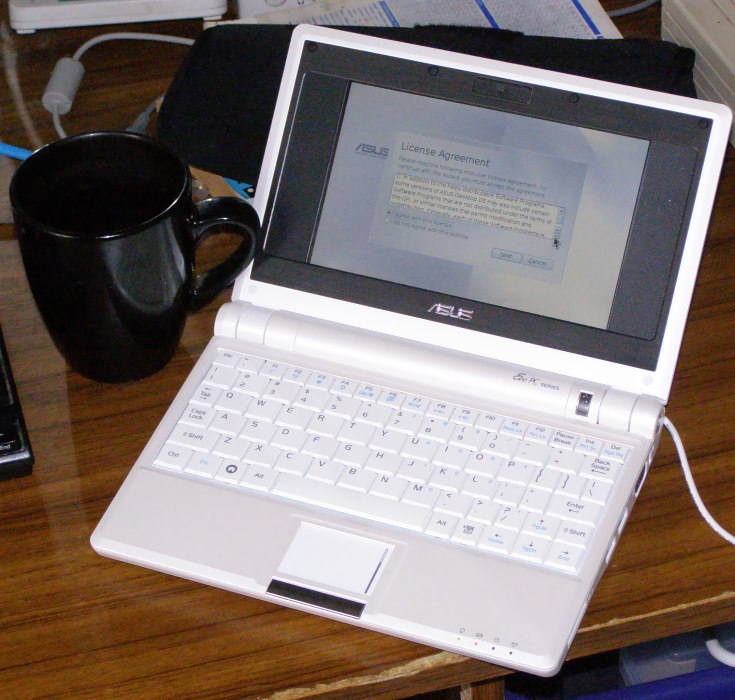
ASUS Eee PC with License Agreement window

In a collaboration of ASUS hardware and the Xandros operating system, the first "netbook" came into being. The ASUS Eee PC was available with either Xandros or Windows XP. The installed version of Xandros is tab based, built from scratch using Xlib and the Qt 4.5 toolkit. The full desktop version (or "Advanced Mode") may be installed—but not always easily—through a set of administrative command prompts. The full desktop version features a KDE 3 desktop with a few modifications performed by Xandros. This desktop mode also provides access to the Synaptic Package Manager which can be used to update and manage the Eee PC's software.

In February 2009 it was announced Xandros is porting its Eee PC Linux distribution to 2 ARM processor-based (Freescale i.MX515 & the Qualcomm Snapdragon CPU) platforms for netbooks & other mobile devices.
