= Freespire =

Linux distribution

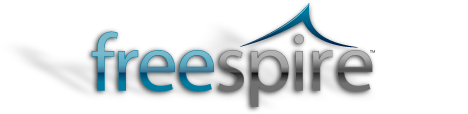
- Developer: PC/Open Systems LLC
- OS family: Linux (Unix-like)
- Working state: Revived/Current
- Source model: Open source (with optional proprietary components)
- Latest release: 10 / 7 December 2023; 2 years ago
- Repository: none
- Available in: English
- Supported platforms: x86-64
- Kernel type: Monolithic kernel
- Default user interface: KDE Plasma (versions 1.8.2 onward)
- License: Free software licenses (mostly GPL) with optional proprietary-licensed components
- Official website: www.freespire.net

Freespire is a community-driven Linux distribution currently owned by PC/Open Systems LLC. It is derived from Linspire and is composed mostly of free, open source software, while providing users the choice of including proprietary software including multimedia codecs, device drivers and application software.

Freespire 1.0 was based on Debian, while Freespire 2.0 was based on Ubuntu. Linspire was bought by Xandros, who originally planned to switch back to Debian for future Freespire releases.

On January 1, 2018, PC/Open Systems announced it had purchased Linspire from Xandros and released Freespire 3.0. While Linspire is available for $29.99, Freespire 3.0 is free.

== History ==
In August 2005, a distribution Live CD based on Linspire's source pools named Freespire hit the web by accident. This distribution was created by Andrew Betts and was not produced or released by Linspire Inc. Freespire was confused by some users to be an actual product from Linspire, and at the request of Linspire the distribution adopted a development codename Squiggle and began looking for a new name. Linspire then, on the back of the generated publicity, offered users a "free Linspire" (purchase price discounted to $0) by using the coupon code "Freespire" until September 9, 2005. Squiggle OS is no longer in active development.

On April 24, 2006, Linspire announced its own project named "Freespire". The new Freespire distribution was announced by then Linspire President and former CEO Kevin Carmony. This follows the model of Fedora being supported by Red Hat and the community since 2003. Novell had also started a similar community project by the name of openSUSE for its SUSE Linux product line in the second half of 2005.

Xandros acquired Linspire/Freespire in the Summer of 2008. Xandros had plans to keep Freespire as a community developed distribution similar to that of openSUSE and Fedora for their respective commercial distributions.

Freespire 2.0.8, released on 30 November 2007, and based on Ubuntu 7.04, was the final release until the distribution was revived with 3.0 in January 2018.

== Features ==
The distribution is a Debian-based, community-driven and -supported project tied to the commercial Linspire distribution. Freespire includes previously proprietary elements from Linspire, such as the Click N' Run (CNR) client, while other elements, which Linspire itself licenses but does not own, like the Windows Media Audio compatibility libraries, remain proprietary, closed source. Consequently, there are two versions of Freespire, one with the proprietary, closed source libraries, and one, called Freespire OSS Edition, that includes mostly open-source components. Freespire has a number of in-house programs written in Haskell and OCaml, such as its ISO image builder, its hardware detection and autoconfiguration, its package autobuilder and "Debian library", and also the programs managing the CGI.

== Releases ==
Version	Release date	Notes
1.0 Release Candidate (1.0.2)	2006-07-28	Release candidate
1.0 (1.0.13)	2006-08-04	Public release based on Debian, Linux kernel 2.6.14, and KDE 3.3.2
2.0 RC (1.9.0)	2007-07-10	Release candidate
2.0	2007-08-07	Public release based on Ubuntu 7.04, Linux 2.6.20, and KDE 3.5.6, with the built-in CNR 7 plug-in
2.0.8	2007-11-30	Fixes and Beta CNR plug-in
3.0	2018-01-01	Have Linux kernel 4.10.0-42, Mozilla Firefox Quantum web-browser, and other software updates.
3.0.1	2018-01-14	Meltdown and Spectre fix.
3.0.6.5	2018-02-08	Linux kernel updated to 4.13.0-32, added new UI tweaks for feedback about distro, removed GParted, updates until February 7, 2018 are applied and more.
3.0.8	2018-03-19	
4.0	2018-08-20	Migration from Ubuntu 16.4 LTS to 18.04 LTS base
4.5	2018-12-20	Security updates
4.8	2019-05-03	Various Updates
5.0	2019-10-15	Various Updates
6.0	2020-02-10	Various Updates
6.0.3	2020-06-22	
7.0	2020-10-30	
7.1	2020-12-28	
7.5	2021-05-09	
7.7	2021-07-30	
8.0	2021-12-05	
8.2	2022-03-02	Swap desktop from MATE to KDE Plasma 5.
9.0	2023-01-23	Swap desktop from KDE Plasma 5 to Xfce
9.5	2023-05-08	Various Updates
10	2023-12--7	Swap desktop from Xfce to modified GNOME

== See also ==
- Linspire
- KDE
- Commercial use of copyleft works
- Microsoft Windows
