= Michael Robertson (businessman) =

American businessman

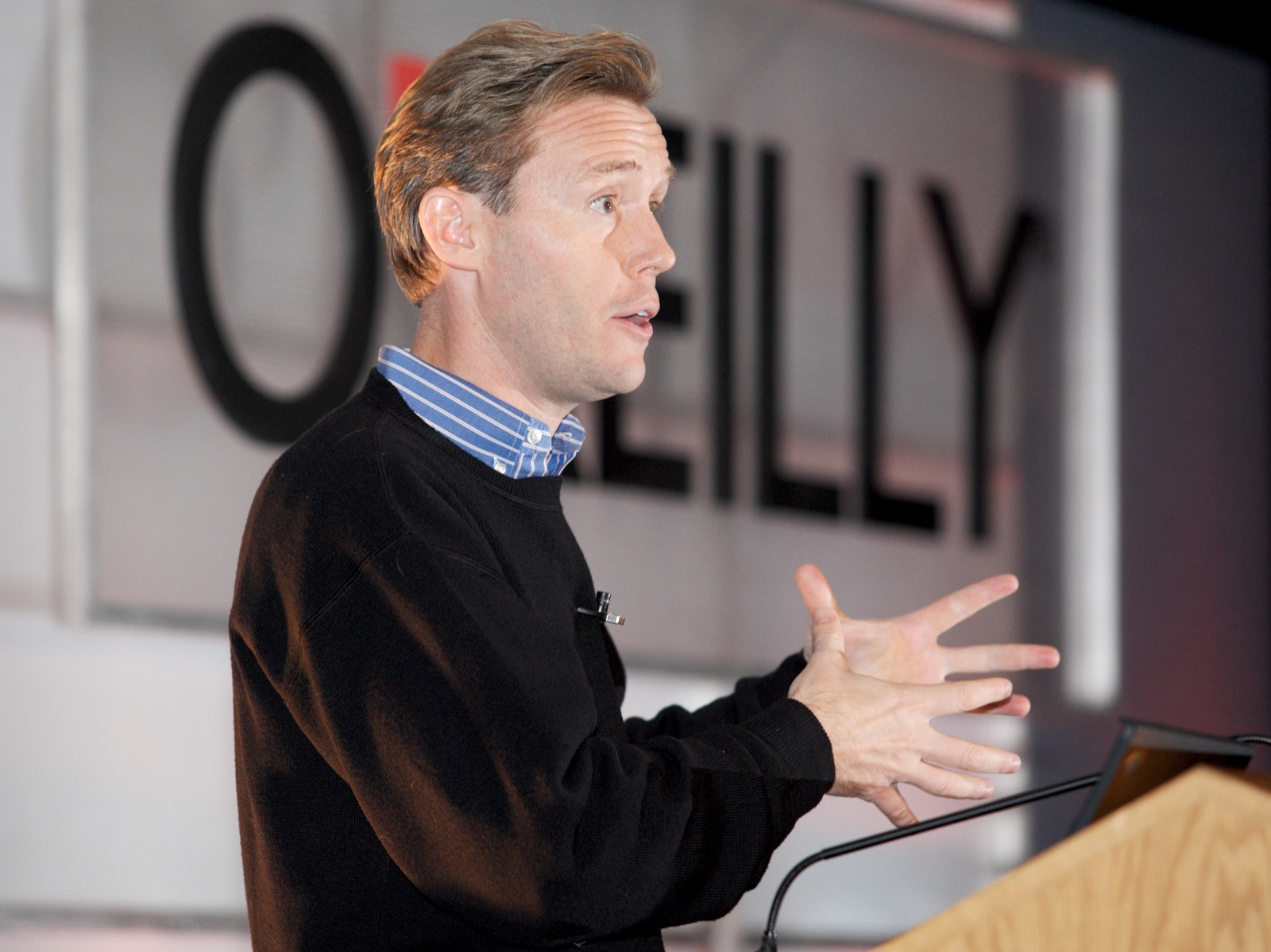
- Robertson at the 2006 O'Reilly Emerging Telephony Conference.
- Born: 1967 (age 58–59)
- Education: University of California, San Diego
- Occupation: Entrepreneur
- Known for: MP3.com, Linspire, SIPphone
- Website: www.michaelrobertson.com

Michael Robertson (born 1967) is the founder and former CEO of MP3.com, an Internet music site. In the years following his departure from MP3.com Robertson has launched several companies, including Linspire, SIPphone, MP3tunes, and Ajax13. He is also founder of OnRad.io, a search engine for radio and DAR.fm, a website for recording audio from internet radio.

Robertson faced numerous lawsuits from major record labels due to copyright infringements from the company's "Beam-it" and "Instant Listening" programs. MP3.com settled the majority of these lawsuits for tens of millions of dollars. The company was later acquired by Vivendi Universal for $385 million.

Robertson founded OS technology company Lindows, which later changed its name to Linspire after settling a trademark lawsuit with Microsoft. Linspire focused on creating an easy-to-use Linux-based operating system for desktops and laptops.

In 2003, Robertson founded SIPphone, which developed free VOIP software called Gizmo5. Google acquired the company in 2009. Robertson also launched MP3tunes.com in 2005, a music download service without digital rights management (DRM). MP3tunes faced a copyright infringement lawsuit by EMI and eventually filed for bankruptcy in 2012.

Robertson earned a bachelor's degree in Cognitive Science from the University of California, San Diego, and currently resides in San Diego. He self-identifies as a libertarian and has been recognized for his innovative contributions to technology.

== Career ==
=== MP3.com ===
Radio is dying because it's inconvenient and limiting. The content is not interactive, and it's available on only a limited number of devices.

— Michael Robertson, quoted in BusinessWeek

Robertson was the founder of the original MP3.com. Despite the early success of MP3.com on Wall Street (the day of the stock IPO (ticker:MPPP), the stock rose from $28 to peak at $103), Robertson quickly led his company into a firestorm of lawsuits generated by the major record labels and music publishing concerns. The litigation sprang from Robertson's "Beam-it" and "Instant Listening" programs. "Beam-it" was a functionality that allowed people to quickly load their existing CD collection into online lockers at my.mp3.com and access their private music collections online. "Instant Listening" allowed instant access to CDs purchased online from participating retailers. However, to launch the service Robertson essentially had to duplicate every music CD ever created. Although MP3.com purchased the CDs for their index and users had to supply their own copy as well, MP3.com violated copyright laws by failing to acquire licenses for the music that was internally duplicated by digitally storing the material on their servers.

Virtually every major record label sued MP3.com, and Robertson's company settled the majority of the lawsuits for tens of millions of dollars. Universal Music, however, held out and took the issue to court. After the trial started, in the case of UMG v. MP3.com, MP3.com was found to have violated copyright laws and ordered to pay as much as $250 million to Universal Music Group. MP3.com paid $53.4 million to settle Universal Music's claim. This legal outcome triggered a class action complaint charging MP3.com and certain officers, including Robertson and company directors with violations of the Securities Exchange Act of 1934.

The action was ultimately resolved under the terms of an agreement whereby the defendants, while continuing to deny all liability, paid into an escrow account $35,000,000 and agreed to issue 2.5 million shares of MP3.com common stock which MP3.com valued at the time at $5,391,000, in exchange for complete dismissals and releases of all claims with prejudice. In addition, under the stipulations, MP3.com agreed to institute certain corporate governance enhancements.

Many saw the case as simple copyright infringement on a grand, even record-breaking scale. The first line of the Court's opinion reads: "The complex marvels of cyberspatial communication may create difficult legal issues; but not in this case. Defendant's infringement of plaintiff's copyrights is clear," rendering such speculations moot.

MP3.com was acquired for $385 million by Vivendi Universal during a buying spree by Vivendi's CEO Jean-Marie Messier. The acquisition was completed on August 28, 2001. After the purchase by Vivendi, Michael Robertson cashed in with an estimated $103 million. In hindsight, after Messier departed Vivendi, the new Vivendi management determined the corporate acquisitions spree to be reckless and later sold MP3.com to CNET which now manages the site. Messier's buying spree accumulated billions of dollars in debt for his company and resulted in company shares falling to 20% of their previous value. Vivendi was compelled to sell off many other companies to scale down its debt.

=== Linspire ===
After leaving MP3.com, Robertson started an OS technology company, Lindows. Since Lindows created a Linux based operating system designed to compete with Microsoft's Windows operating system, Microsoft filed trademark related lawsuits in the United States and abroad. Given that the trademarked "Windows" name was in some jeopardy, Microsoft paid to settle the lawsuit they initiated with a $20 million payment to Lindows and certain licenses with Lindows agreeing to change their name worldwide to Linspire.

Linspire championed an easy-to-use system for desktops and laptop computers and signed on popular retailers, both offline and online, including Walmart.com, TigerDirect, Frys and MicroCenter. Linspire was based on Debian (and later Ubuntu) with a KDE interface. Linspire was most distinguished by CNR, an early app store.

In 2008, Robertson attempted to sue Linspire's bank, Comerica, in an attempt to get Comerica to refund severance payments which had been made to laid-off Linspire employees. Robertson alleged the severance payments were actually funds which had been embezzled by the laid-off employees. The San Diego Police Department investigated and quickly came to the conclusion that this was a simple dispute between Robertson and Linspire's CEO at the time, Kevin Carmony, and no embezzlement or other crime had been committed. Robertson lost the lawsuit without it getting past summary judgment. Robertson then filed a civil suit against the six former employees directly, for which he was counter sued. The jury sided largely with the employees, awarding a $238,000 judgement against Robertson. A smaller judgement of $80,000 was awarded to Robertson, however, this judgement was vacated and set aside by Judge Taylor. Judge Taylor stated in his ruling, “It is plain to the court that Linspire [Robertson] was not required to act in the protection of its interests as it did. Rather, Linspire [Robertson] approached this case as a vehicle for a test of will as between Robertson and Carmony.”

In an effort to defend the names of the former employees being sued by Robertson, a website critical of Robertson called Freespire.com [that site is no longer active, it has been moved here: http://clipish.net/freespire/] was launched in February 2008. The Freespire.com site states that it is "dedicated to shedding light on the REAL Michael Robertson," and discloses information and facts about Robertson. In an attempt to have the Freespire.com site taken down, Robertson had Linspire (renamed as Digital Cornerstone) file a lawsuit, claiming the site violated trademark law. In 2010, Robertson lost the lawsuit with the court saying the site did not infringe on any trademarks and was protected as free speech. Judge Judith F. Hayes stated in her ruling, "...the Court finds the general purpose of the website to be a free speech forum wherein Defendant criticized the management of Plaintiff."

=== SIPphone ===
In 2003 Robertson founded SIPphone, which utilized the SIP telecommunication standard. In addition to selling phone adapters and routers, SIPphone developed free VOIP software to compete with Skype based on the SIP standard called Gizmo5, which is available on a variety of platforms. On November 12, 2009, Google announced that it had acquired the company and relocated the team to Mountain View to join the Google Voice team.

=== MP3tunes ===
In February 2005, Robertson launched MP3tunes.com, which sold downloadable music. Robertson boasted that, unlike Apple's iTunes Music Store and most other competitors at the time, MP3tunes did not use digital rights management (DRM) technology to limit the use of songs its customers purchased. MP3tunes also provided Oboe, a digital music back-up service (later referred to by the company as a 'music locker'). MP3tunes stopped selling digital music in 2008.

Like Robertson's first online music company MP3.com, MP3tunes.com was sued for copyright infringement lawsuit by a major recording label, EMI, through its U.S. division, Capitol Records. The lawsuit resulted from a side-project website that Robertson created called Sideload.com. This site allowed people to search music hosted on various servers around the Internet and side load them to their MP3tunes music locker. The sources of these anonymous files varied. Some were legitimate MP3 files that were legal to download. Others were pirated MP3s which had been uploaded by people and indexed by search engines.

In April 2008, Robertson pleaded with the MP3tunes user group to help fund the legal defense regarding the EMI lawsuit.

The Capitol Records, Inc. v. MP3Tunes, LLC case had a mixed outcome, with the court holding that MP3tunes was generally not liable for copyright infringement by its users, but was liable in cases where takedown notices were ignored or where Robertson himself had seeded the site with unlicensed music. The decision was viewed as a victory for online storage and cloud music services, but the legal battle was very costly for the company.

MP3tunes filed for Chapter 7 bankruptcy on April 27, 2012. Included among the creditors were his lawyers ($1.4 million), several employees ($10,775), and even the coffee vendor ($96). The only secured creditor listed in the filing was Robertson himself, through his SKL Trust.

In March 2014, a New York jury ordered Robertson to pay roughly $41 million in damages for massive copyright infringement by MP3tunes for the works of Capitol Records, EMI and other record labels and music publishers. MP3tunes had filed for bankruptcy protection in 2012, but the jury found Robertson personally liable for the copyright infringement. The plaintiffs brought the copyright case in 2007.

=== Ajax 13 ===
Founded in early 2006 by Robertson (CEO) and Hisham El-Emam (CTO), Ajax 13 Inc. is a software development company that provides web-based applications written using XUL. Ajax 13 offers ajaxWrite, a web-based word processor as a software as a service.

== Education and personal life ==
He earned a bachelor's degree in Cognitive Science from the University of California, San Diego, where he studied under Donald Norman and interned at the nearby San Diego Supercomputer Center.

Robertson lives in San Diego, California. His reported wealth has varied widely, but he has been on the Forbes 400 list once and twice on the Fortune 40 under 40, most recently in 2004. In 1999, he was named to the MIT Technology Review TR100 as one of the top 100 innovators in the world under the age of 35.

In October 2012, Robertson filed a petition to legally change his name to Michael Lee Hammer, alleging he was abused during childhood by his stepfather. In Judge William Pauley's ruling in the MP3tunes/EMI copyright trial, Pauley singled out the story Robertson told on the witness stand about this alleged abuse, stating that Roberton's "seemingly rehearsed, five-minute fable-like narrative left the jury nonplussed and Plaintiffs' counsel shell-shocked. It was a dramatic presentation. Even if true, Robertson's decision to spin this yarn backfired on him. The jury saw it for what it was—a transparent attempt to tug at their heartstrings." The judge further observed, "Jurors see through performances, and the Oscars are over for this year."

In 2010, Robertson and his wife Leslie Burcham legally separated, though it is speculated by former business partners that this move was a guise to hide assets up for grabs in one of Robertson’s many failed court cases.

Robertson self-identifies as a libertarian.

In 2002, Robertson and his wife founded the Robertson Education Empowerment Foundation (REEF) to provide University of California, San Diego students with financial aid, under the agreement that they would contribute a percentage of their later earnings to the foundation's funds.
