= Linspire =

Linux distribution

- Screenshot of Linspire (old version, there is a more recent one)
- Developer: PC/OpenSystems LLC
- OS family: Linux (Unix-like)
- Working state: Active
- Source model: Mixed (open and closed source)
- Initial release: August 2001; 25 years ago
- Latest release: 14 / December 18, 2023; 2 years ago
- Update method: CNR
- Kernel type: Monolithic (Linux)
- Default user interface: GNOME, Xfce
- License: Mainly GNU GPL and other free software licences, as well as some proprietary software licenses
- Official website: www.linspirelinux.com

Linspire (formerly Lindows) is a commercial operating system based on Debian and Ubuntu and currently owned by PC/OpenSystems LLC. It had been owned by Linspire, Inc. from 2001 to 2008, and then by Xandros from 2008 to 2017.

On July 1, 2008, Linspire stockholders elected to change the company's name to Digital Cornerstone, and all assets were acquired by Xandros.

On August 8, 2008, Andreas Typaldos, CEO of Xandros, announced that Linspire would be discontinued in favor of Xandros; Freespire would change its base code from Ubuntu to Debian; and the Linspire brand would cease to exist.

On January 1, 2018, it was announced that PC/OpenSystems LLC had purchased Linspire and Freespire from Xandros, and that Linspire 7 was available for $79.99, while Freespire 3 was available for free.

== History ==
Based in San Diego, California, Lindows, Inc. was incorporated in July 2001 by Michael Robertson and began selling products in January 2002. Robertson's goal was to develop a Linux-based operating system capable of running major Microsoft Windows applications. It based its Windows compatibility on the Wine API. The company later abandoned this approach in favor of attempting to make Linux applications easy to download, install and use. To this end, a program named "CNR" was developed: based on Debian's Advanced Packaging Tool, it provides an easy-to-use graphical user interface and a slightly modified package system for an annual fee. The first public release of Lindows was version 1.0, released in late 2001.

In 2002, Microsoft sued Lindows, Inc. claiming the name Lindows constituted an infringement of their Windows trademark. Microsoft's claims were rejected by the court, which asserted that Microsoft had used the term windows to describe graphical user interfaces before the Windows product was ever released, and that the windowing technique had already been implemented by Xerox and Apple Computer many years before. Microsoft sought a retrial and after this was postponed in February 2004, offered to settle the case. As part of the licensing settlement, Microsoft paid an estimated $20 million, and Lindows, Inc. transferred the Lindows trademark to Microsoft and changed its name to Linspire, Inc.

In 2003, Lindows Mobile PC, which starts at $799, was launched. Lindows said that about Excel about 95%, Word about 90% and PowerPoint about 80% functional. The notebook computer was low cost. Its processor, 933-megahertz C3, was made by VIA Technologies. The laptop weighed 2.9 pounds, had a 12.1-inch screen, 256 megabytes of RAM and a 20-gigabyte hard drive.

On June 15, 2005, Michael Robertson announced on his personal blog that he was stepping down as CEO of Linspire, Inc., and was replaced by Kevin Carmony.

Linspire became a member of the Interop Vendor Alliance which was founded in 2006.

On February 8, 2007, Linspire, Inc. and Canonical Ltd, the lead sponsor and developer of the Ubuntu operating system, announced plans for a new technology partnership, with Linspire aiming to "begin basing ... [their] desktop Linux offerings on Ubuntu."

On June 13, 2007, Linspire and Microsoft announced an interoperability collaboration agreement with a focus on document format compatibility, instant messaging, digital media, web search, and patent covenants for Linspire customers. This agreement was criticised, most notably by the Groklaw website for being disingenuously short-lived and limited, and against the spirit of the GNU General Public License. Linspire CEO Carmony, in a blog post on the company's website, said that the agreement would "bring even more choices to desktop Linux users, and together, offer a 'better' Linux experience."

Linspire bases its product code names on fish found near its headquarters: Linspire/LindowsOS 4.5 was code named Coho; Linspire Five-0 (5.0 and 5.1) and Freespire 1.0, Marlin; and Freespire 2.0 and Linspire 6.0, Skipjack.

== CNR ==
Linspire's CNR (originally Click'N'Run) was a software distribution service based on Debian's APT. It was designed to serve as a GUI-based, user-accessible means of downloading and installing various applications, both free and proprietary. The service allowed users to install available applications using a single click. CNR also included a set of Click and Buy (CNB) software, which included many commercial applications to members at a discounted rate. CNR had over 38,000 different software packages, ranging from simple applications to major commercial works such as Win4Lin and StarOffice. CNR was originally subscription-based with two tiers: basic service cost $20 annually, and gold, featuring discounts on some commercial applications, $50. In 2006, Linspire announced that the basic service was to be made available for free.

Linspire planned to port CNR to the Ubuntu distribution. The company announced on April 24, 2006 that CNR would be released under an open source license. The release of the free CNR client was planned to coincide with the release of Freespire 2.0 and Linspire 6.0. On January 23, 2007, Linspire announced that it intended to provide CNR for other Linux distributions, both APT- and RPM-based, including Debian, Fedora, OpenSUSE and Ubuntu. This support was expected to appear in mid-2007. On February 8, 2007, Linspire, Inc. announced a partnership with Canonical Ltd., publisher of the Ubuntu Linux distribution. This deal would see Linspire and Freespire migrate from the unpredictable Debian release process to the semiannual Ubuntu release cycle. It was intended that the main Ubuntu distribution would become the first recipient of the opening of the Click'N'Run service to Linux distributions besides Linspire.

== Freespire ==
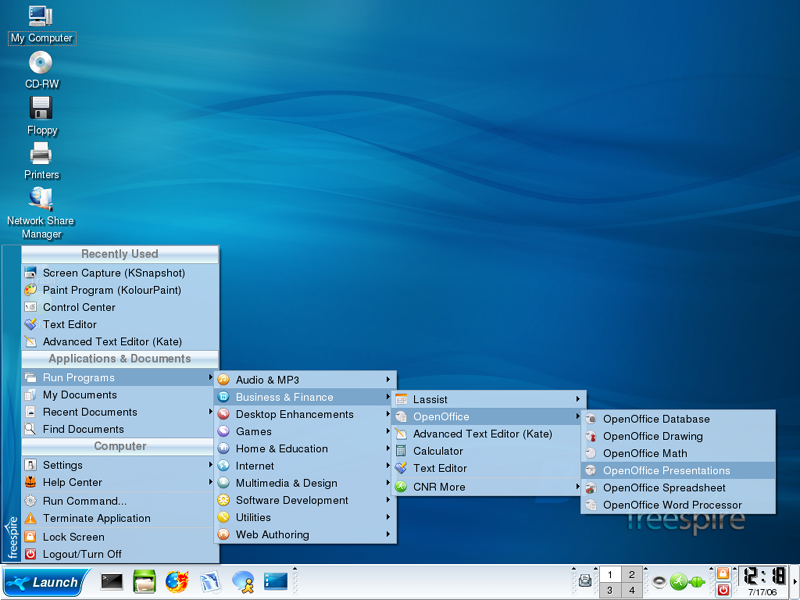
Freespire RC1

In August 2005, Andrew Betts released Freespire, a Live CD based on Linspire. Some users mistook this for a product from Linspire, Inc. Linspire, Inc. offered users a "free Linspire" (purchase price discounted to $0) by using the coupon code "Freespire" until September 9, 2005. On April 24, 2006, Linspire announced its own project named "Freespire". This followed the model of community-oriented releases by Red Hat and Novell in the form of Fedora and openSUSE. Freespire was a community-driven and -supported project tied to the commercial Linspire distribution, and included previously proprietary elements from Linspire, such as the CNR Client, while other elements, which Linspire, Inc. licenses but does not own, like the Windows Media Audio compatibility libraries, remain closed-source. Consequently, there are two versions of Freespire, one with the closed source libraries, and one, called Freespire OSS Edition, that includes only open-source components.

Freespire 1.0 was released on August 9, 2006. Freespire 2.0.8, released on 30 November 2007, and based on Ubuntu 7.04, was the final release until the distribution was revived with 3.0 in January 2018.

== Contributions ==
Linspire, Inc. sponsored open source projects including the Pidgin and Kopete instant messaging clients, the Mozilla Firefox web browser, the ReiserFS file system, the Nvu WYSIWYG website editor, and the KDE-Apps.org and KDE-Look.org websites.

== Criticism ==
Linspire has drawn some criticism from the free software community. This has included criticism for including proprietary software, with GNU founder Richard Stallman commenting: "No other GNU/Linux distribution has backslided so far away from freedom. Switching from MS Windows to Linspire does not bring you to freedom, it just gets you a different master." In addition, following the initial Freespire announcement Pamela Jones of the Groklaw website published an article entitled "Freespire: A Linux Distro For When You Couldn't Care Less About Freedom;" that was highly critical of Linspire, Inc., and the Freespire project, for including closed-source components and advertising them as a favourable point—an action she classed as ignoring free and open-source software (FOSS) community values in a "community-driven" distribution, asserting that "Free Software isn't about proprietary drivers" and that "proprietary codecs, drivers and applications are not Open Source or open in any way." In response, Linspire, Inc. CEO Kevin Carmony stated via a journalist on the Linspire website that in ten years of holding out, the FOSS community has made relatively few gains, that many users are already using proprietary software and, although some would hold out, most would prefer to have something that works rather than nothing. He also asserted that the company believed in open source software, but also in the freedom of individuals to choose whatever software they want.

== See also ==
- Commercial use of copyleft works
- Zorin OS, Linux Mint, MX Linux, free Linux distributions designed to imitate Windows or recommended for longtime Windows users
