= Namsan Seoul Tower =

Communications and observation tower in Seoul, South Korea

- The tower and lattice transmission tower (left) in 2018

- Location within Seoul
- Alternative names: YTN Seoul Tower; N Seoul Tower; Namsan Tower; Seoul Tower

General information
- Status: Completed
- Type: Communication tower
- Location: 105 Namsangongwon-gil, Yongsan-dong 2-ga, Yongsan-gu, Seoul, South Korea
- Coordinates: 37°33′04″N 126°59′18″E
- Construction started: December 1969; 56 years ago
- Completed: August 1975; 51 years ago
- Owner: YTN

Height
- Antenna spire: 279 m (915 ft)
- Top floor: 239 m (784 ft)

Design and construction
- Architect: Jang Jong-ryul

Website
- www.seoultower.co.kr/en/

Seoul Future Heritage
- Official name: 남산서울타워
- Designated: 2018
- Reference no.: 2018-006

Korean name
- Hangul: 남산 서울 타워
- RR: Namsan Seoul tawo
- MR: Namsan Sŏul t'awŏ

Namsan Seoul Tower (Korean: 남산 서울 타워), also known as the YTN Seoul Tower, Namsan Tower, Seoul Tower or N Seoul Tower, is a communication and observation tower located on the summit of Namsan in central Seoul, South Korea. The 236-metre-tall (774 ft) structure was the nation’s first tower servicing multiple TV and radio broadcasters, and is considered a landmark and symbol of the city.

The tower has gone by different names over time, and continues to have several used by various entities. Namsan Seoul Tower is used by the national and city government — and YTN Seoul Tower by its owner, YTN — to refer to the entire structure, from its base to the top of its antenna. CJ Foodville, the concessionaire operating the observation levels of the tower and the shops and restaurants located on them, markets those under the name N Seoul Tower. Local residents and Korean popular culture tend to use Namsan Tower or Seoul Tower.

== History ==
The tower was proposed by a consortium of broadcasters and the South Korean government to house commercial broadcasting facilities and communications facilities for national law enforcement and security agencies, as well as areas for the public including observation decks, a museum and a coffee shop. Ground broke in December 1969. The tower reached its full height when the concrete shaft and mast were topped out in 1971, and the project was completed when the observation decks were finished in 1975.

A safety inspection upon completion raised concerns with allowing access by the general public; photos taken from the observation deck, it was felt, might compromise security of the Blue House and other government properties. President Park Chung-hee ordered that the tower was therefore “to be used only as a transmission tower, strictly prohibited for any other purposes, and that special measures be taken regarding security issues."

The observation decks remained disused until the tower was opened to the public in October 1980, a year after Park’s assassination. The Postal Mutual Aid Association bought the tower that same year and owned it until 1999, when it was forced to sell to shore up its pension fund, which had become insolvent.

The tower was put up for bids from private companies, and YTN — its current owner — was selected.

In April 2005, YTN contracted with a division of the chaebol CJ Group to lease, renovate and operate the observation levels of the complex. That section of the tower reopened under the name N Seoul Tower in December 2005. In December 2015, YTN opened the renovated lower levels of the base building as Seoul Tower Plaza.

Public access has been an ongoing national security issue, with restrictions on photography imposed to inhibit surveillance of the presidential residence. From 2022 to 2025 during the administration of Yoon Suk Yeol, the official residence was relocated from the Blue House to what had been the residence of the Foreign Minister in Hannam-dong. A designated photo zone with views of Yoon's home was closed during his time in office.

A less-publicized historical function of the tower has been to house equipment which jams broadcast signals coming from North Korea, to prevent their reception within South Korea.

== Floors and amenities ==
Section	Floor	Amenities
N Seoul Tower
N Seoul Tower	T7	Rotating French restaurant n•Grill
N Seoul Tower	T6	Open-air observation deck (closed to public since 2005)
N Seoul Tower	T5	Enclosed observation deck; coffee and snack shop N Sweet Bar; gift shop N Gift
N Seoul Tower	T4	Enclosed observation deck; dessert café A Twosome Place
N Seoul Tower	T3	Korean restaurant Hancook
N Seoul Tower	(tower shaft)	
N Seoul Tower	T2	Italian restaurant The Place Dining; Roof Terrace
N Seoul Tower	T1	Ticket booth; restaurant/bar N Terrace; traditional Korean snack bar Durimi Bunsik; burger restaurant N Burger; 7-Eleven
N Seoul Tower	5F	Observation deck; information center; restrooms
Seoul Tower Plaza
Seoul Tower Plaza	4F	Gaming arcade; massage chair lounge; OLED wave
Seoul Tower Plaza	3F	Broadcast equipment and security area (not open to public)
Seoul Tower Plaza	2F	Four restaurants including Cinnabon; OLED circle
Seoul Tower Plaza	1F	Ticket counter and elevator to T3-7; restaurants and cafés including Starbucks, Gong Cha and Mom's Touch; convenience store GS25; OLED panorama and tunnel
Seoul Tower Plaza	L/B1	Lobby

== Access ==
Base station of the Namsan Cable Car

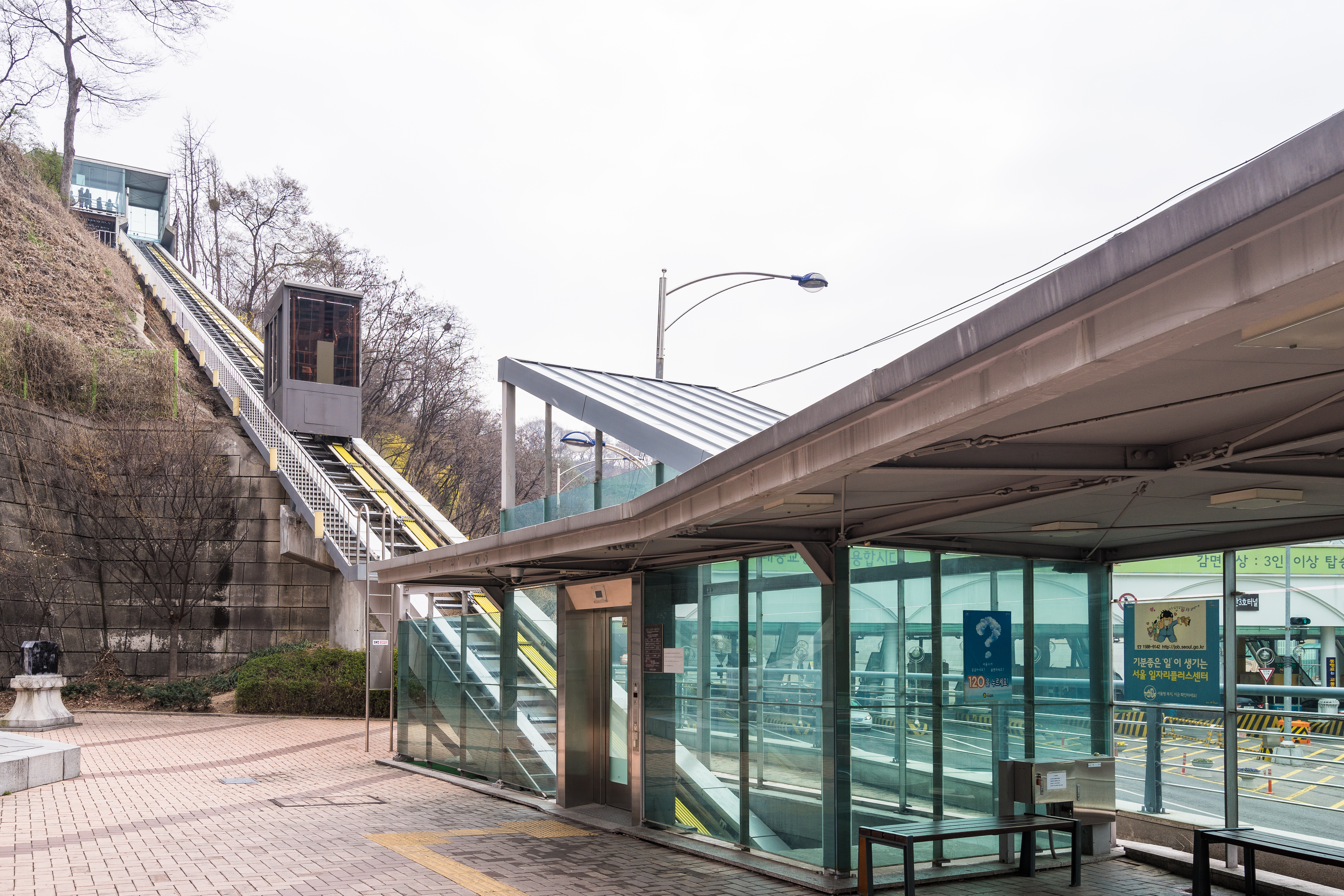
Namsan Oreumi

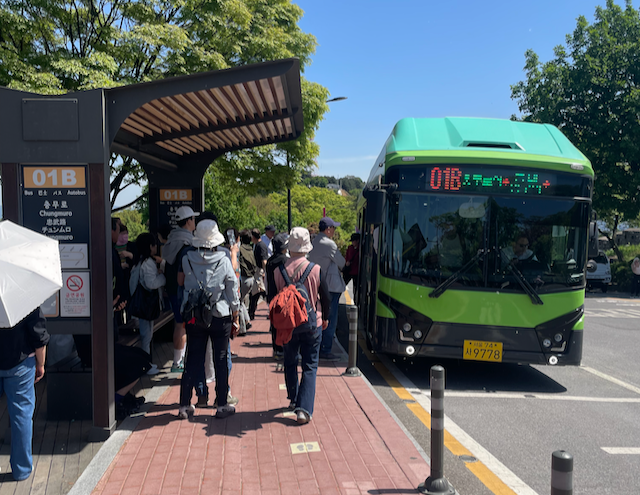
01B shuttle at tower bus stop

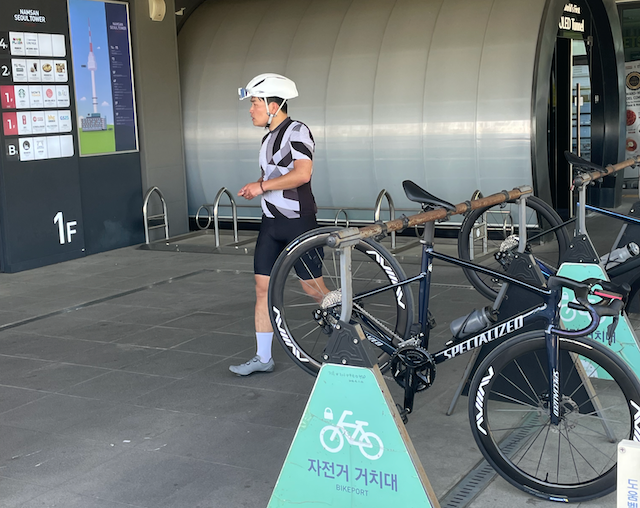
Bicycle parking at Namsan Seoul Tower

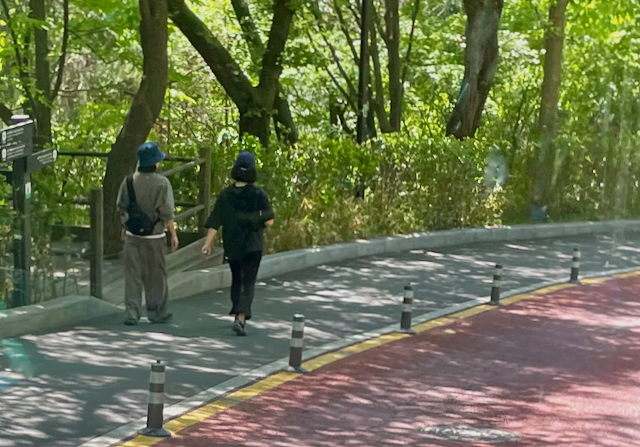
Separated pedestrian path along the South Ringway below the tower

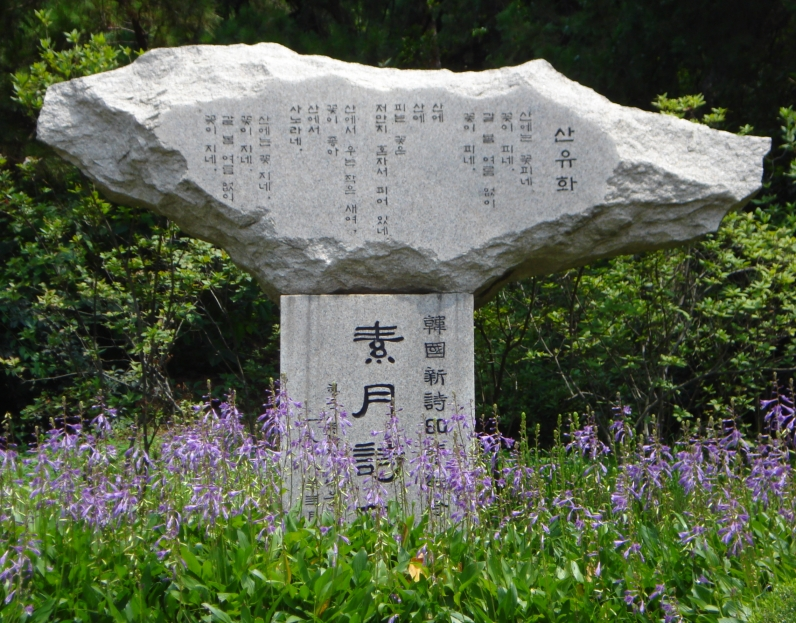
Monument to the poet Sowol at the entrance to the Namsan Sky Forest Trail

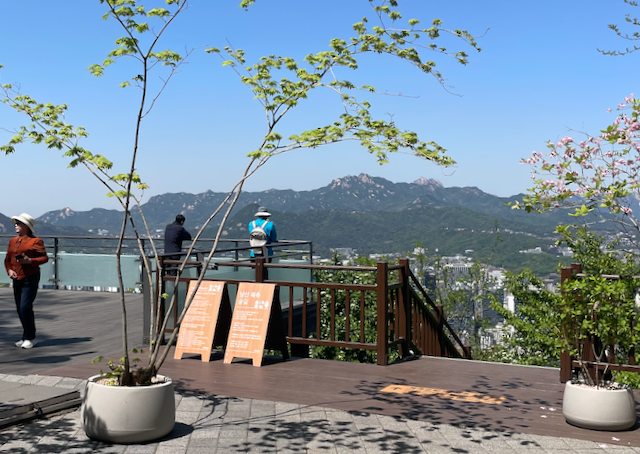
Entrance to the Northern Forest Trail from Palgakjeong Square

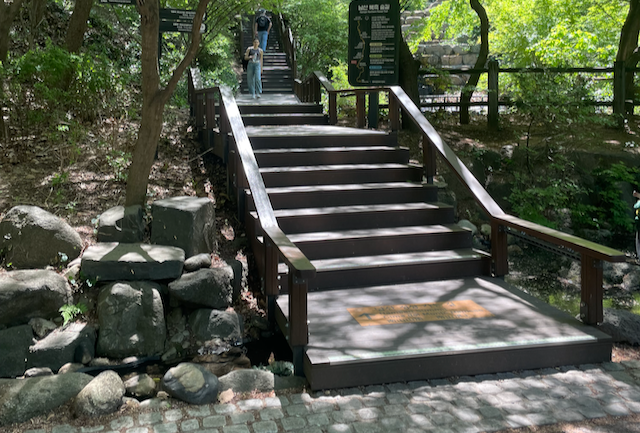
Start of the Northern Forest Trail along the North Ringway

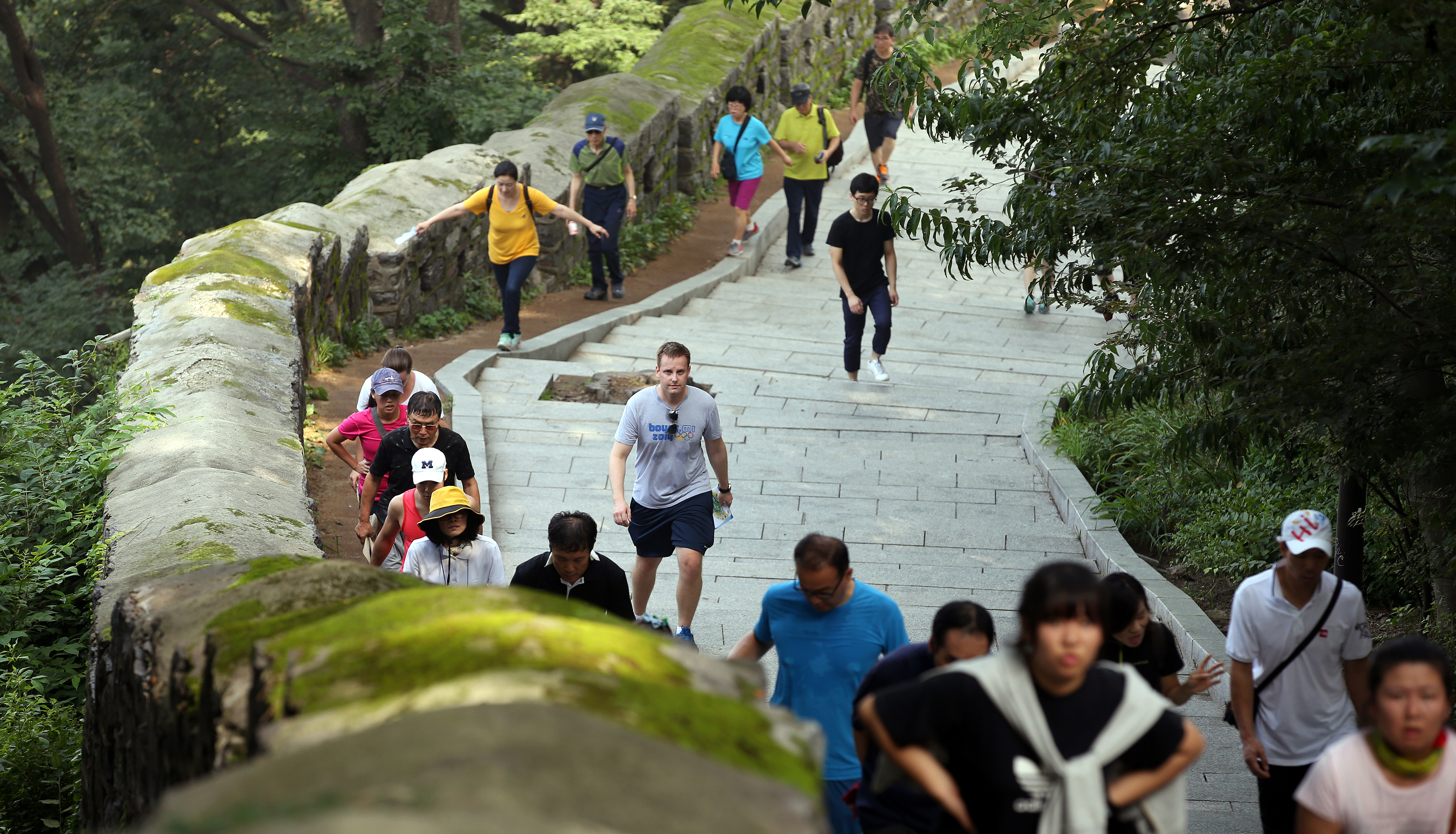
Central Stairway leading to the tower, flanked by the Seoul City Wall

The 12 million annual visitors to Namsan Seoul Tower reach it in a number of ways. Until 2005, it was possible for personal vehicles and taxis to be driven to the base of the tower, but the street leading to it is now restricted to bus and bicycle traffic only. The nearest parking lots are a 30-to-40-minute uphill walk to the tower entrance.

=== Cable Car ===
The Namsan Cable Car predates the tower, having opened in 1962 as South Korea’s first aerial tramway. It provides a three-minute ride from its base at the northern edge of Namsan Park to the tower. An inclined elevator, the Namsan Oreumi, was opened in 2009 to connect Sogong-ro to the cable car station; a free shuttle bus also has frequent service from Exit 1 of Myeongdong Station.

The upper station sits below the tower, and users must climb a stairway to reach Palgokjeong Square and the tower's entrance.

The Seoul Metropolitan Government — which built the Namsan Oreumi — announced in 2023 plans to build its own aerial gondola, designed to take passengers directly from Myeongdong Station to the tower in a 5-minute ride. Ground was broken the following year, but construction halted soon after when the longtime operator of the Namsan Cable Car successfully fought the project in court on environmental grounds.

Litigation was ongoing as of January 2026, at which time the project remained stalled at 15% complete.

=== Bus ===
Direct bus service to the tower is provided by city-operated shuttle buses and commercial tourist buses.

Seoul public transit bus lines 01A and 01B operate in clockwise loop routes around Namsan. They serve the tower and other stops including Metro stations and car parks, as well as the parking facility for chartered tour motor coaches (which are not permitted to drop off groups directly at the tower).

Hop-on hop-off sightseeing buses also stop at the tower at half-hour intervals during morning and afternoon, and twice evenings.

=== Bicycle ===
The tower can be accessed by bicyclists via the South Ringway. The winding, one-way street — also known as Namsangongwon-gil, or Namsan Park Road — is open only to bicycles and CNG-powered shuttle and sightseeing buses, sparing cyclists exposure to exhaust fumes from vehicles they share the route with. Access is from the northeast edge of Namsan Park, next to the National Theater of Korea. After visiting the tower, cyclists continue on the South Ringway and exit the park on the northwest end near the Namsan Public Library.

Dedicated bicycle parking at the tower is limited, and some riders resort to locking their bikes to nearby railings in front of the entrance to Seoul Tower Plaza.

There is no Seoul Bike dock onsite, meaning users of that municipal bikeshare service are unable to end their rides at the tower or start new bike rentals upon leaving, and must pay for rental time during their visits.

=== Walking ===
Namsan Park contains a number of walking trails which connect either directly or indirectly to the tower, including:

- South Ringway: The road used by bicyclists and buses has a separated pedestrian lane along its downhill edge. At points along the route, restrooms and observation areas are available. Multiple trails lead downhill from it to attractions at the park's southern border of Sowol-ro, including the Yong-yi Gateball Court and the Namsan Botanical Garden.
- Namsan Sky Forest Trail: Opened in October 2025, this elevated deckway attracted more than 50,000 visitors in its first three weeks. It uses switchbacks and spirals to maintain a grade of less than 4.6° along its 1.4 km route, and varies in width to squeeze among the mountain's trees — none of which were felled during construction. Its barrier-free design accommodates those using strollers or wheelchairs. Winding from Sowol Park at its base to a rest area and Health Garden along the South Ringway, the trail features numerous observation points and other attractions. At its end, visitors can continue the remaining 15-to-20-minute walk to the tower using either the South Ringway's pedestrian lane, or an elevated wood stairway alongside.
- Namsan Northern Forest Trail: The only direct link between Namsan Seoul Tower and the North Ringway, which is a wide 3.5 km pedestrian-only paved path along the mountain's northern face. Most of the trail— opened in July 2025 — is an elevated wood staircase with 954 steps along a .5 km route where there was previously a ground-level service stairway for park workers. It connects to the tower via Palgakjeong Square.
- Seoul City Wall Perimeter Path: The longest pedestrian route connecting to the tower, this 4.2 km path along the Joseon-era Hanyangdoseong extends beyond the park's boundaries as far as Seoul Station and the Jangchung Arena. Upon entering the park from Seoul Station, it crosses Baekbom Square and ascends the mountain alongside the wall via the Central Stairway, past the upper cable car station to its highest point at Palgakjeong Square. From there it begins its descent briefly along the South Ringway before rejoining the wall for most of its eastward trajectory through the park. The path can also be accessed from Myeongdong via the Samsoon Steps along Sopa-ro.

== Visiting ==
Entrance to the lower levels (B1-T2) of the tower complex is free. For levels T3-T7, tickets can be bought onsite or in advance online through third-party platforms. Discounts of 30% are given to children ages 3-12, adults over 65, Korean residents with disabilities, and those with national merits. Children under age 3 are admitted free of charge. Special rates and packages are available to groups of 20 visitors under the age of 18.

Patrons of the restaurants on levels T3 and T7 have free admission to the upper levels of the tower when advance reservations are made.

In 2012, surveys conducted by the Seoul Metropolitan Government revealed foreign tourists ranked Namsan Seoul Tower as the number one tourist attraction. The tower, along with Changdeokgung, was in 2015 selected as one of the world's top 500 tourist destinations in Lonely Planet's Ultimate Travel List.

== Attractions ==
=== Palgakjeong Square ===
Also known as Namsan Octagonal Pavilion Square, this public plaza adjoins level T2 of the tower and is at the end of the upper walkway leading from the bus stop. Its name comes from the palgakjeong, or traditional eight-sided pavilion, at its far end; built in 1959 to honor President Syngman Rhee, the pavilion was dismantled the following year by April 19 Revolution protesters and rebuilt in 1968.

The square offers sweeping views of Seoul north of Namsan. Beyond the pavilion are the Namsan Bongsudae (beacon towers), a row of stone structures built on the mountain early in the Joseon Dynasty to send signals using smoke (by day) and fire (by night). Destroyed during the Japanese colonial period, they were reconstructed in 1993. Six days per week, the beacon lighting is reenacted by participants wearing replicas of Joseon-era military attire.

Other features built into the pavement of the square include a raised performance stage in front of the pavilion; a 500-year time capsule, placed in 1985 and to be opened in 2485; (Note: Not to be confused with the nearby Seoul Millennium Time Capsule commemorating Seoul’s 600th anniversary as capital, placed in 1994 and to be opened in 2394) and a marker for the geographic center of Seoul, which contains GPS equipment and serves as a trig point for geodetic surveying.

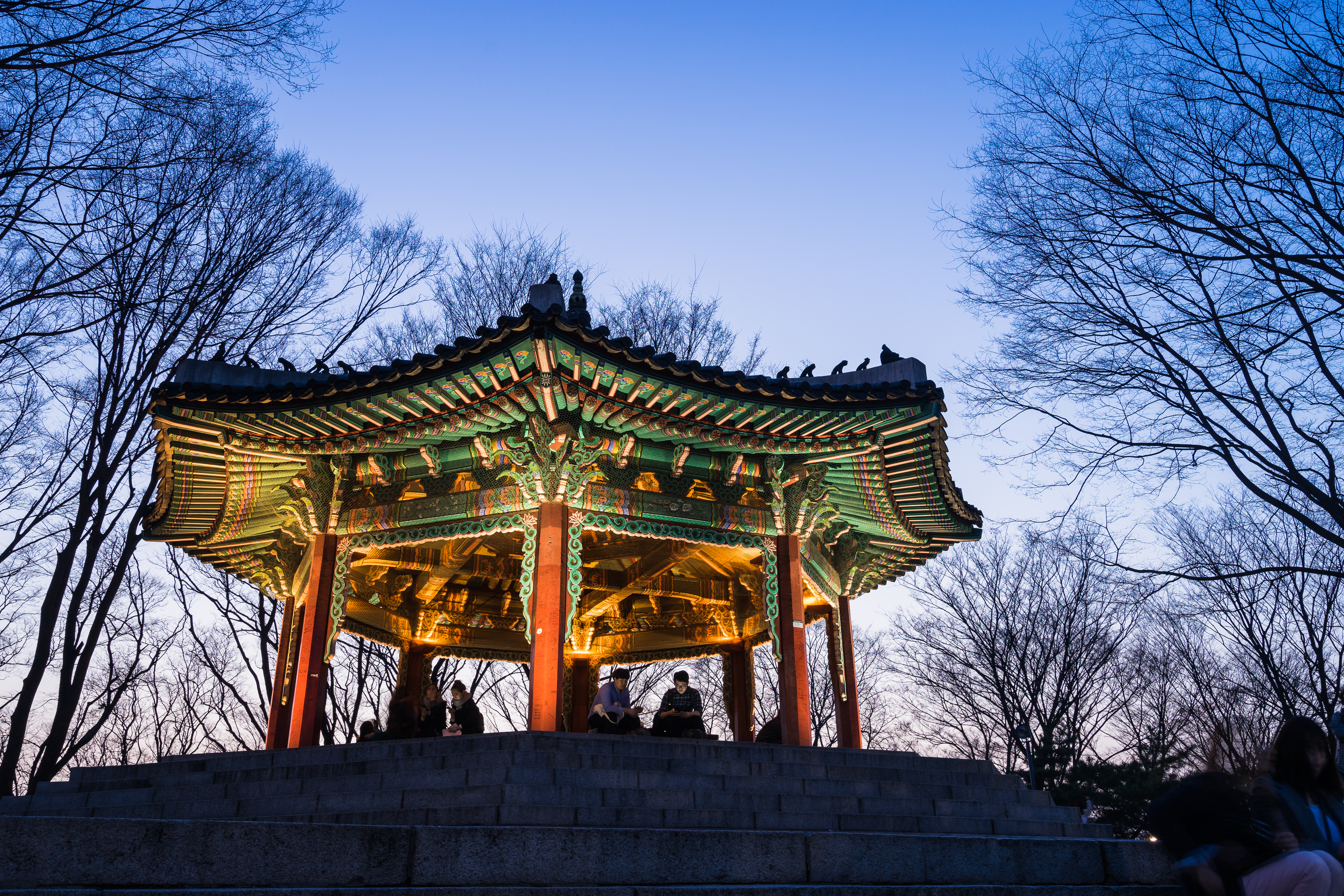
Namsan Palgakjeong at dusk

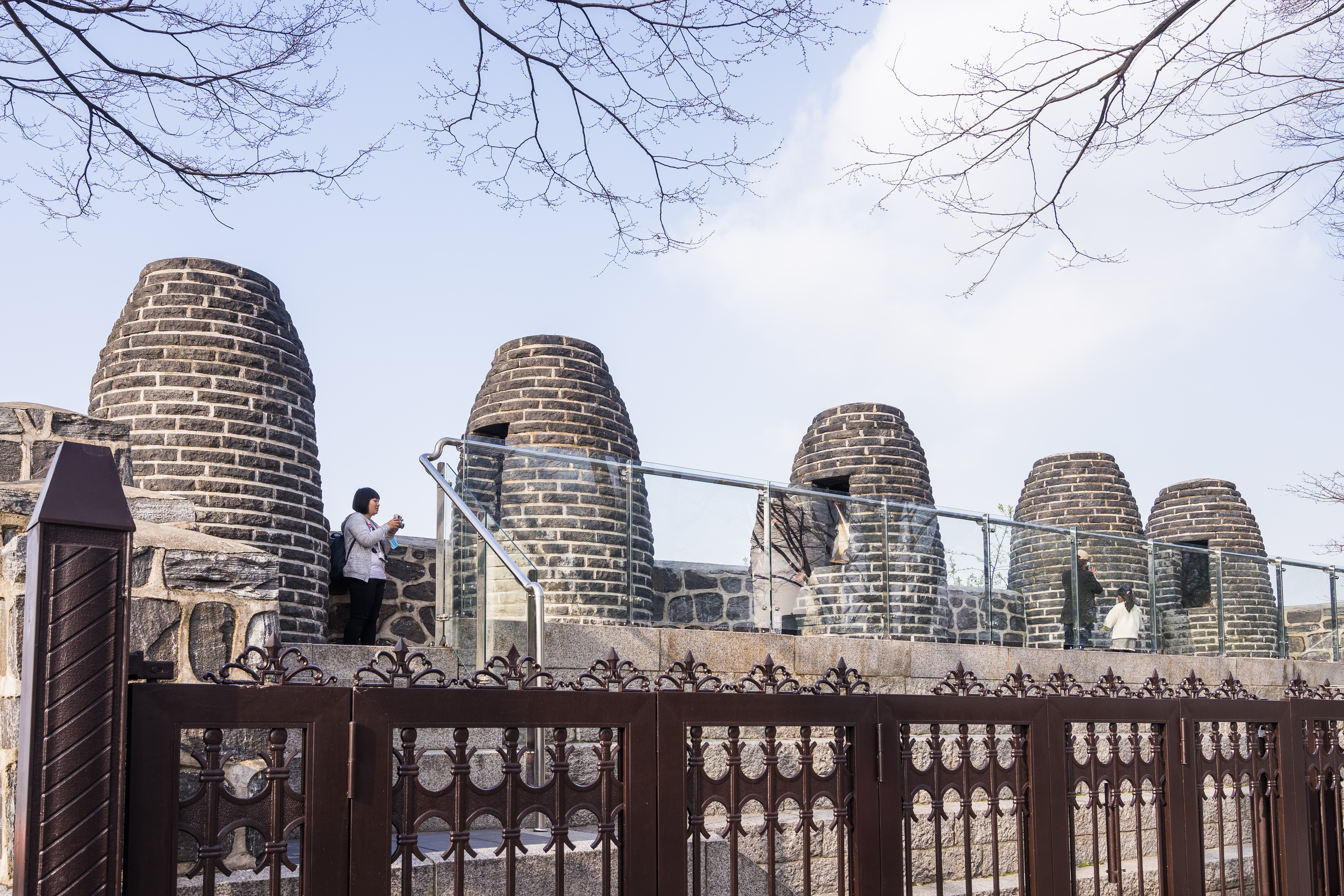
Namsan Beacon Towers

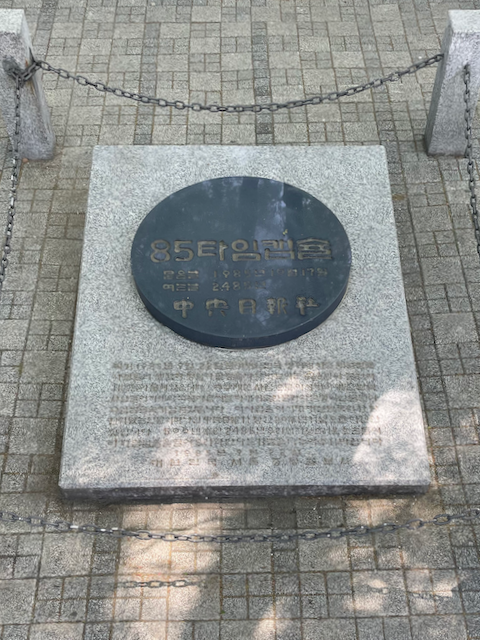
Time capsule

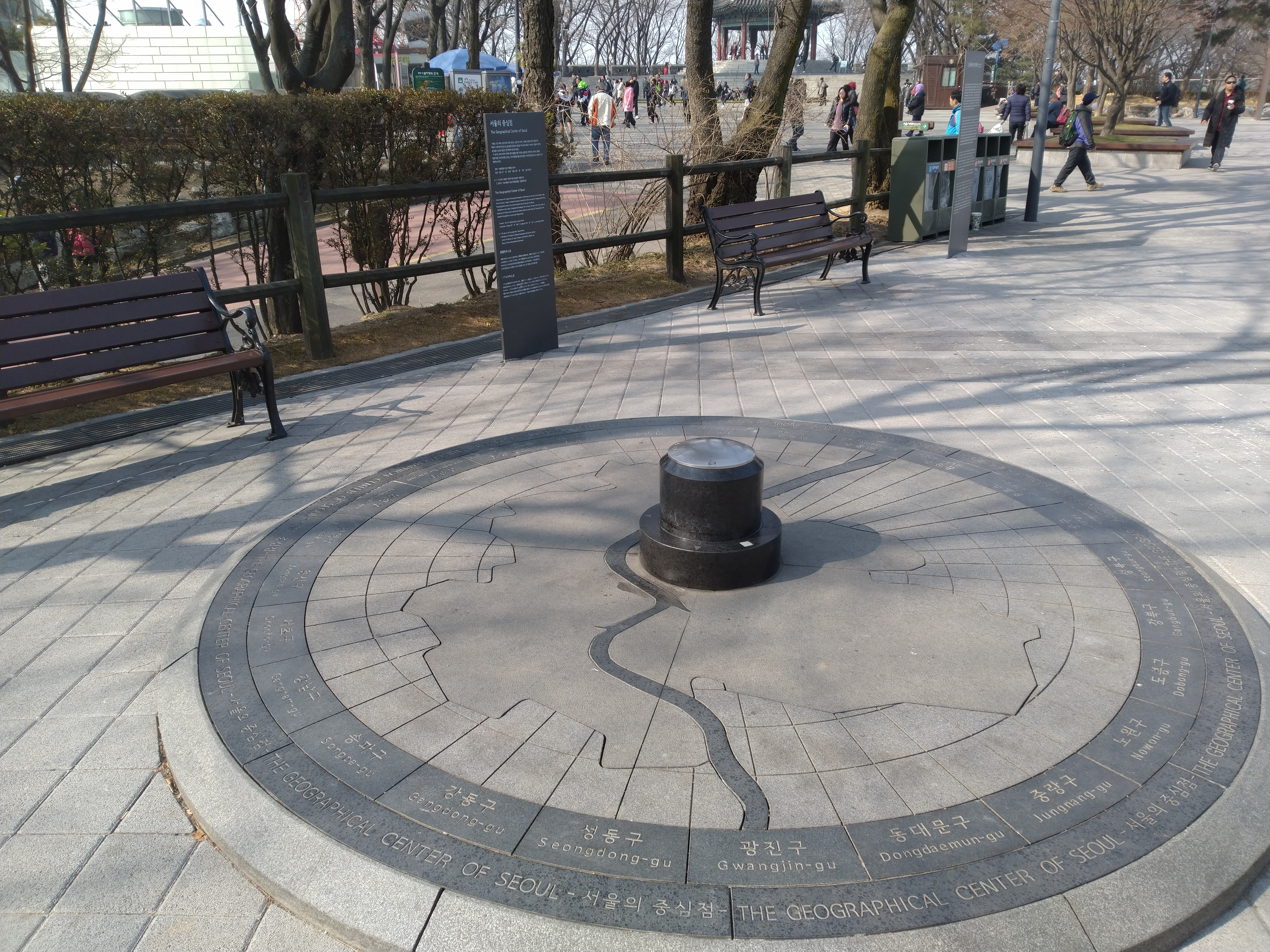
Geographic center of Seoul

=== Lighting of the tower ===
Namsan Seoul Tower on an evening when air quality is "average"

The tower is illuminated from sunset to 11 pm (10 pm in winter) in one of four colors which signal the air quality in Seoul as measured by fine dust concentration. Blue lighting indicates “good” air quality; green, “average”; yellow, “bad”; and red, “very bad.”

For special occasions or to mark significant events, sections of the shaft can each be illuminated in different colors. The tower was lighted red, white and blue after the November 2015 Paris attacks, and blue and yellow in 2022 to show solidarity with Ukraine after its invasion by Russia.

During Earth Hour, lights are turned off nationwide to promote energy conservation awareness, including those of the tower.

=== Love locks ===
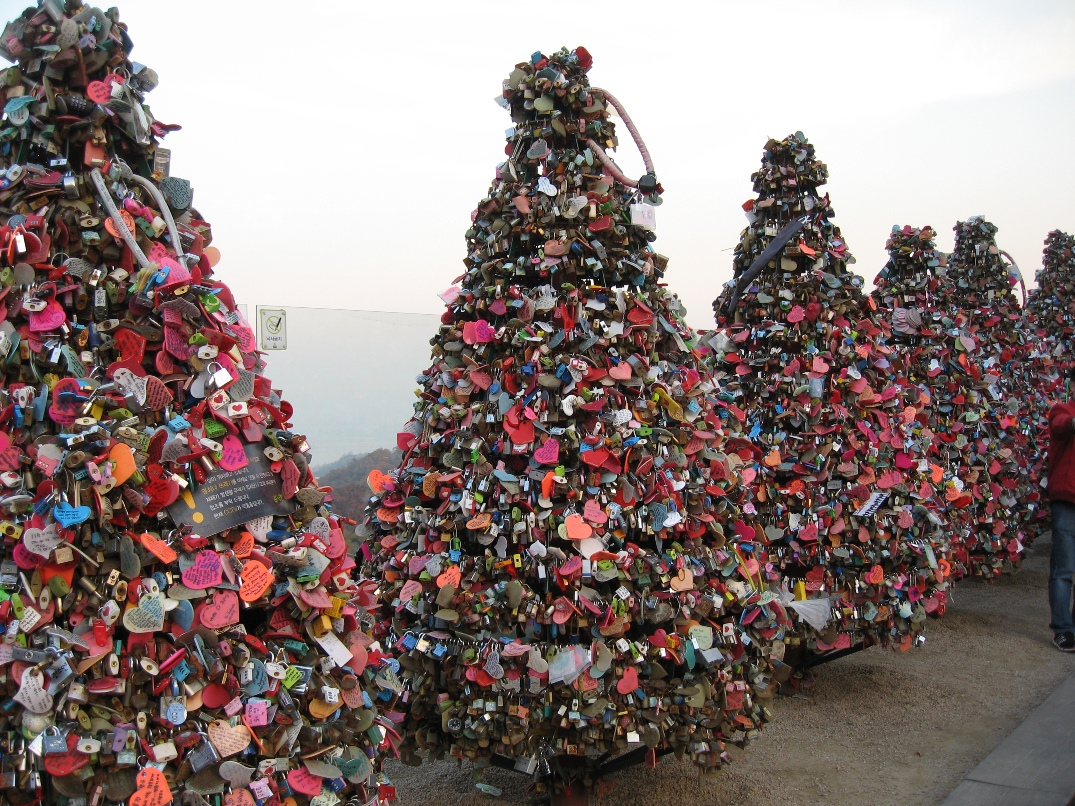
Love lock trees on level T2

The first love locks appeared at the tower in 2006, and the following year the locks were officially promoted as an attraction. Inscribing a padlock and fastening it to a fixed spot is a way to demonstrate and celebrate the love between romantic partners; at Namsan Seoul Tower, it is also done by Hallyu stans to show their devotion to a particular idol or actor. The latter practice reflects the great number of K-dramas which have used the tower as a location.

Love locks are affixed at designated areas in the tower complex, including official Photo Zones such as the Proposal Staircase (level 1F); Bridge of Love (3F); Tunnel of Love / Graffiti Wall of Love (4F-5F), as well as the Roof Terrace (T2).

A 2011 poll found that hanging love locks at the tower was the favorite activity of 16% of foreign visitors to Seoul.

In 2018, it was determined that the total weight of the love locks at the tower was 82 tons.

=== Video displays ===
The public floors of Seoul Tower Plaza feature arrays of OLED panels in varying configurations. Level 1F has a 9-metre (30 ft) tunnel and a 15-by-3-metre (49.2 ft × 9.8 ft) curved panorama. Level 2F features an overhead ring of panels. Suspended from the ceiling of level 4F is a 24-metre-long (79 ft) array arranged to undulate like ocean waves.

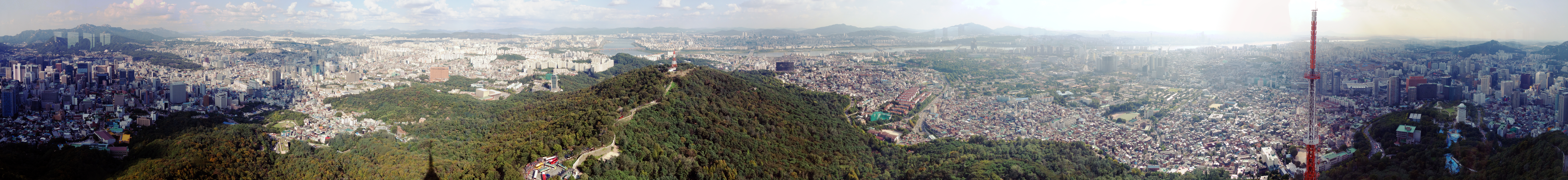
Daytime image of Seoul from Namsan Seoul Tower, as shown on the 1F curved panorama array
Night image of Seoul from Namsan Seoul Tower, as shown on the 1F curved panorama array

== Broadcasting use ==
Namsan Seoul Tower is used as a radio/television broadcast and communications tower.

=== Television broadcasters ===
==== ATSC 1.0 stations ====
Channel	Channel name	Callsign	Station	Power	Broadcast Area
6	SBS TV Seoul (HD)	HLSQ-DTV	Seoul Broadcasting System (SBS)	5 kW	Seoul Capital Area
7	KBS2 Seoul (HD)	HLSA-DTV	Korean Broadcasting System (KBS)	5 kW	Seoul Capital Area
9	KBS1 Seoul (HD)	HLKA-DTV	Korean Broadcasting System (KBS)	5 kW	Seoul Capital Area
10.1	EBS TV Seoul (HD)	HLQL-DTV	Educational Broadcasting System (EBS)	5 kW	Seoul Capital Area
10.2	EBS 2 Seoul (HD)	HLQL-TV-2	Educational Broadcasting System (EBS)	5 kW	Seoul Capital Area
11	MBC TV Seoul (HD)	HLKV-DTV	Munhwa Broadcasting Corporation (MBC)	5 kW	Seoul Capital Area

==== ATSC 3.0 stations ====
Channel	Channel name	Callsign	Station	Power	Broadcast Area
7	KBS2 (UHD)	HLSA-UHDTV	Korean Broadcasting System (KBS)	5 kW	Seoul Capital Area
9.1	KBS1 (UHD)	HLKA-UHDTV	Korean Broadcasting System (KBS)	5 kW	Seoul Capital Area
9.2	KBS News D (HD)	HLKA-UHDTV-2	Korean Broadcasting System (KBS)	5 kW	Seoul Capital Area

=== Radio broadcasters ===
Frequency	Station name	Callsign	Power	Broadcast Area
96.7 MHz	KFN FM	HLSF-FM	2 kW	Seoul Capital Area
99.1 MHz	Gugak FM	HLQA-FM	5 kW	Seoul Capital Area
101.3 MHz	tbs eFM	HLSW-FM	1 kW	Seoul Capital Area

== In popular culture ==
The climax of the 2025 animated film KPop Demon Hunters takes place in a fictional stadium at the base of the tower, which the film refers to as Namsan Tower.

The 2011 K-pop song Itaewon Freedom by the hip-hop duo UV feat. J.Y. Park begins with the artists asking, “Where is Namsan Tower?”

The tower appears in scenes filmed in Namsan Park in the Netflix science fiction drama Sense8.

== Gallery ==
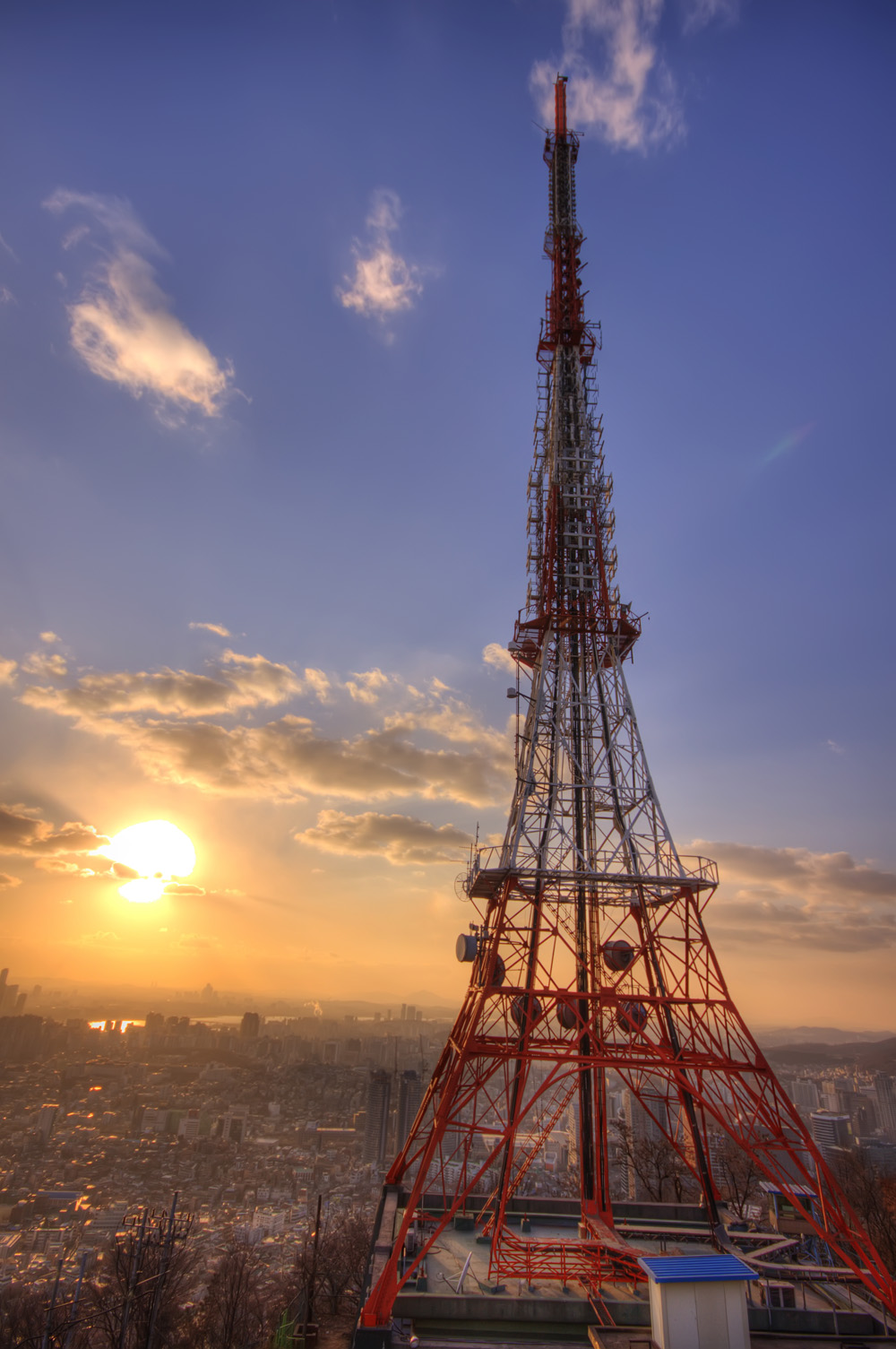
Lattice tower at sunset

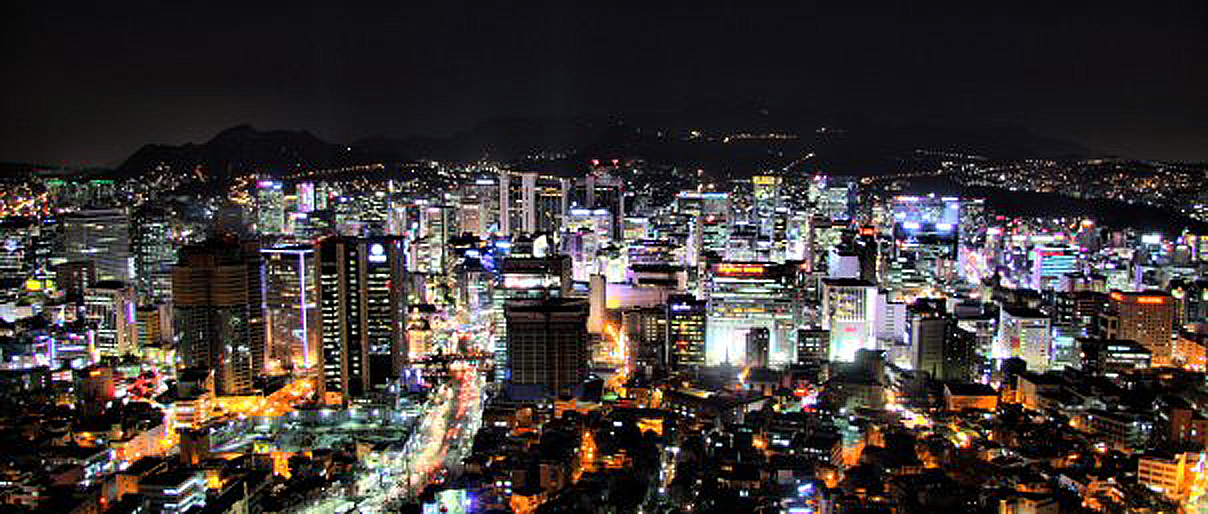
A view of Seoul from Namsan Seoul Tower

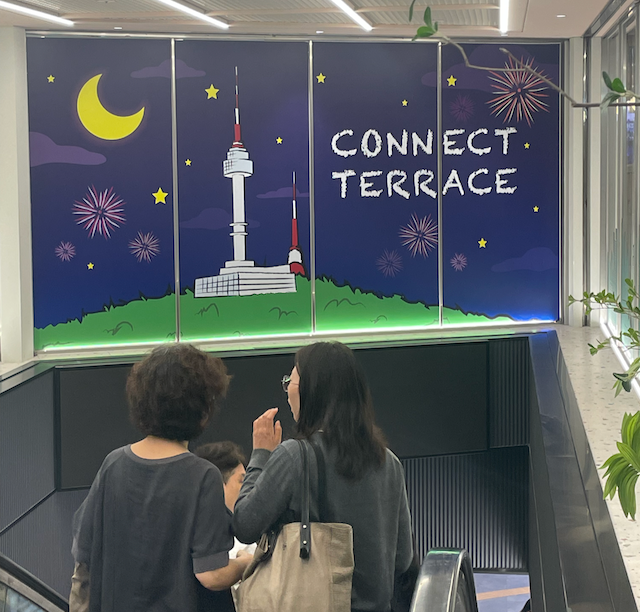
The tower depicted in signage at Seoul Station

Tower at night

== See also ==
- Pyongyang TV Tower, a similar broadcasting and observation tower in North Korea
- Busan Tower, an observation tower in Busan
- List of tallest buildings in South Korea
- YTN Group
