= CJ Foodville =

South Korean food company

CJ Foodville Co., Ltd.
- Logo
- Native name: 씨제이 푸드빌
- Company type: Corporation
- Industry: Food; Foodservice
- Founded: July 1, 2000; 25 years ago in Seoul, Seoul Capital Area, South Korea
- Headquarters: Jung District, Seoul, South Korea
- Area served: South Korea
- Key people: Chang-geun (CEO)
- Services: Catering
- Revenue: ₩-7,399,515,626 (2015)
- Operating income: ₩10,515,825,667 (2015)
- Net income: ₩36,234,298,681 (2015)
- Total equity: ₩72,922,830,000 (2015)
- Owner: CJ Group (96.02%); Lee Jae-hyun (2.56%); Others (1.42%)
- Number of employees: 15,539 (2015)
- Parent: CJ Group
- Divisions: Wedding banquet business division: ArpelGamos Co., Ltd. (2016)
- Website: www.cjfoodville.co.kr/eng/

CJ Foodville is a South Korean western-style food and food service company based in Seoul that does catering service. CJ Foodville is a subsidiary of CJ Group.

== History ==
Taking Korean food abroad, CJ Foodville has launched bakeries and restaurants globally. Starting with opening a Tous les Jours store, a bakery chain, in Los Angeles in 2004, CJ has launched the chain also in China and Vietnam, where double-digit sales growth is maintained. The first Tous Les Jours in Hanoi, Vietnam, opened in June 2012, and in December 2012, the 20th and 21st Tous les Jours opened in New Jersey and New York.

Also brands of Foodville, VIPS (steakhouse) and A Twosome Place (coffee shope) have opened stores in China and Vietnam as well as other countries in Asia.

Bibigo is a Bibimbap (a traditional Korean food) restaurant which CJ planned as a global brand from the beginning, opening in Los Angeles, Beijing and Singapore since 2010. It also opened its first store in London in 2012 during the London Olympics.

== Subsidiaries ==
- Tous Les Jours
- VIPS
- The Place
- Seasons Table
- Cheiljemyunso
- VIPS Burger
- China Factory Delight
- CJ Foodworld
- N Grill
- Juice Solution
- Bibigo
- N Seoul Tower
- Busan Tower

== Past subsidiaries ==
- SkylarkL Co., Ltd. (was in business from 1994 to 2006)
- Seafood Ocean
- Fisher's Market
- Cold Stone
- Rocco Curry
- China Factory (was in business from 1997 to 2017)
- Dadam (Transferred to CJ CheilJedang)
- Th Euo (Transferred to CJ CheilJedang)
- MongJungHeon (Transferred to CJ CheilJedang)
- A Twosome Place (Sold to Anchor Equity Partners in 2020; now owned by The Carlyle Group)
