= Scarlet Blade =

Scarlet Blade may refer to:

- The Scarlet Blade (also The Crimson Blade), a British film
- Scarlet Blade (video game), a European/American localization title for Queen's Blade, a Korean MMORPG
- Scarlet Blade Theatre, a British theatre
