= CJ LiveCity =

South Korean entertainment venue company

- Native name: CJ라이브시티 (in Korean)
- Company type: Private
- Industry: Property development, entertainment, leisure
- Founded: 22 December 2015
- Headquarters: 60, Taegeuk-ro, Ilsandong-gu, Goyang-si, Gyeonggi-do, Republic of Korea 19, World Cup buk-ro 56-gil, Mapo-gu, Seoul, Republic of Korea
- Key people: Kim Jin-gook(CEO)
- Parent: CJ ENM / CJ Group

CJ LiveCity Co., Ltd. is a live entertainment venue company in South Korea founded in 2015 with the purpose of developing and operating a music arena and mixed-use facilities for studios, commercial, and retail. It is planned to open in 2027.

== History ==
CJ LiveCity, a subsidiary of CJ ENM in the entertainment division of CJ Group, was established in 2015 when CJ Group participated in a public project initiated by Gyeonggi Province to promote the commercialization of Hallyu (the Korean Wave) tourism. The company was initially named "K-Valley Co., Ltd." and changed to its current name on April 2, 2019.

The groundbreaking ceremony for the Arena, its major facility, took place on October 27, 2021.

However, construction of the Arena abruptly halted in April 2023. This was attributed to a sharp increase in construction costs resulting from the Russian invasion of Ukraine and the persisting effects of the pandemic, which caused a downturn in the real estate and construction sectors. As of the end of March 2023, the progress rate of the construction was at 17%.

In addition to the downturn in the construction industry, CJ LiveCity has faced various external obstacles with the local authorities regarding the project agreement signed in 2015. These obstacles include delays in permit issuance, the improvement of water quality in the stream across the entire area, and most critically, the notification of the postponement of large-scale power supply by Korea Electric Power Corporation(KEPCO).

In October 2023, as part of the government's support for infrastructure and industrial projects facing similar difficulties, CJ LiveCity sought mediation for the agreement in question from a committee overseeing project finance, which the Ministry of Land, Infrastructure, and Transport (MOLIT) in South Korea reinstated after a ten-year suspension.

== Business ==
=== CJ LiveCity ===
The development of CJ LiveCity is underway in the Seoul metropolitan area of Goyang-si, Gyeonggi-do, covering a total area of 326,400m^{2}. CJ LiveCity will encompass a music arena, facilities for content experience and tourism, commercial spaces, accommodations, offices, and a waterfront park.

The arena at CJ LiveCity is planned to have an indoor seating capacity of 20,000 and an outdoor space capable of accommodating over 40,000 people. Hanwha E&C, a South Korean construction company with experience in arena construction, has been entrusted with the project.

=== Partnership ===
The arena is jointly operated with AEG, an American global sporting and live music entertainment company.

AEG operates and owns more than 300 venues worldwide. Some notable venues in their portfolio include the Crypto.com Arena in the United States (formerly the Staples Center), the O2 Arena in the UK, and the Uber Arena(Mercedes-Benz Arena) in Germany. Additionally, they handle the coordination and management of world tours for global artists like Taylor Swift, the Rolling Stones, Katy Perry, Justin Bieber, and Celine Dion, as well as organizing notable festivals such as Coachella and BST Hyde Park. Their collaboration with CJ LiveCity commenced in June 2019 with the signing of their first Memorandum of Understanding (MOU).

The master plan of the entire complex was designed by Foster + Partners, a renowned British architectural firm specializing in high-tech engineering architecture. Foster + Partners, founded by Pritzker Prize-winning architect Norman Foster, is well known for designing Apple's new headquarters, Apple Park (also known as Apple Campus 2), in California, USA.

== Surrounding environment ==
- 일산호수공원
- 고양종합운동장
- 일산백병원
- 일산서부경찰서
- 일산서구청
- 블루밍 킨텍스 더센트 Deok-i-dong, scheduled for 2029
- 킨텍스 국제전시장
