= District 187: Sin Streets =

2012 video game

- Developer: Netmarble
- Engine: LithTech
- Platform: Microsoft Windows
- Release: November 20, 2012
- Genre: First-person shooter
- Mode: Multiplayer

District 187: Sin Streets (Korean: 지구 187 : 신 거리) was a first-person shooter video game developed by Netmarble, a subsidiary of CJ Corporation. An online multiplayer, the game pits SWAT teams and gangsters against each other in urban combat. The game was released on November 20, 2012, with digital distribution through Steam made available on November 28.

== Gameplay ==
The game resembles Counter-Strike, including its "cops and robbers" setup, game modes and map layouts. It features an extensive weapon modification system that allows both mechanic and cosmetic upgrades. The game focuses on clans and team-based progression. Clans will compete for territory, with clan performance in four weekly "street fight" events determining possession of city districts.

=== Business model ===
District 187 is free-to-play, with all weapons available for in-game currency only. Players are charged real money for cosmetic modifications and for upgrades that speed up the acquisition of in-game currency.

== Development ==
The game was developed for western audiences by CJ Corporation's North American subsidiary. On October 3, 2013, the developers shut down the game servers and took the game offline. It is now no longer available.

== Turkish version ==
This game was adapted for the Turkish country and will exist until 2015 under another name: S2 Son Silah.
