= Netmarble =

South Korean mobile game developer

Netmarble Corporation
- Native name: 넷마블 주식회사
- Type: Public
- Traded as: KRX: 251270
- Industry: Video game
- Founded: March 1, 2000; 26 years ago
- Founder: Bang Jun-hyuk
- Headquarters: Guro District, Seoul, South Korea
- Area served: Worldwide
- Key people: Park Sean (CEO)
- Products: Video games
- Revenue: ▲KRW 2.8 trillion (2025)
- Operating income: ▲KRW 352.5 billion (2025)
- Net income: ▲KRW 230.8 billion (2025)
- Total assets: ▲KRW 8.1 trillion (2025)
- Total equity: ▲KRW 1,310 billion (2016)
- Owner: Bang Jun-hyuk (38.340%); CJ ENM (16.78%); NC Corporation (6.80%); NongHyup Bank (5.01%); Tencent (4.70%)
- Number of employees: 3,000 non-consolidated in Korea (2016)
- Subsidiaries: Kabam; Kung Fu Factory; Jam City, Inc. (minority stake)
- Website: }}

Netmarble Corp. (Korean: 넷마블 주식회사) is a South Korean game developer and publisher, which was founded in 2000 by Bang Jun-hyuk.

== History ==
Netmarble originated from the game developer Ipopsoft (아이팝소프트), which faced financial trouble in the late 1990s. In 1999, Bang Jun-hyuk was appointed an outside director, and took over the company the next year when it went into financial issues. Bang became the CEO, and the company was rebranded as Netmarble. At launch, Netmarble had 8 employees with a founding capital of ₩100,000,000.

After early success, Netmarble was acquired by CJ Group in 2004. Bang stepped down in 2006 due to health issues but returned in 2011 to refocus the company on mobile games.

In 2015, Netmarble developed Lineage 2: Revolution, which surpassed $924 million in revenue within 11 months of launch. The company continued releasing RPG mobile titles like Seven Knights, Raven (Evilbane), and Everybody's Marble. As of 2015, it employed over 3,000 people and operated in 120+ countries. Netmarble went public in May 2017, raising $2.4 billion.

Netmarble also formed a strategic partnership with CJ ENM and invested in SGN.

Between 2015 and 2017, Netmarble licensed Disney IPs, producing games such as Marvel: Future Fight (2015), Disney Magical Dice (2016), and Star Wars: Force Arena (2017).

In 2017, Netmarble acquired Kabam's Vancouver studio. In 2018, it appointed Park Sean as co-CEO alongside Kwon Young-sik.

That year, Netmarble acquired a 25.71% stake in Big Hit Entertainment (now Hybe Corporation), becoming its second-largest shareholder.

Netmarble later shut down both Disney Magical Dice and Star Wars: Force Arena, citing lack of support, leaving only Future Fight active.

In December 2019, Netmarble acquired a 25.08% controlling stake in the home appliance rental company Coway from the Woongjin Group for approximately 1.74 trillion won ($1.46 billion). The acquisition was officially completed on February 11, 2020.

In 2021, Netmarble acquired Kung Fu Factory and launched the subsidiary Metaverse Entertainment with Kakao Entertainment. It debuted the virtual girl group Mave: in 2023.

Marvel Future Revolution launched in August 2021 but was shut down in August 2023 due to underperformance. In January 2024, Netmarble shut down Metaverse Entertainment and laid off 70 employees.

As of 2021, Netmarble's major shareholders included Bang Jun-hyuk (24.12%), CJ ENM (21.78%), Tencent via Han River Investment Pte. Ltd. (17.52%), NCsoft (6.8%), and others (29.78%).

In July 2025, Netmarble's liquidity was significantly strengthened by its investment in HYBE shares. Despite selling approximately ₩743 billion worth of stock in 2023 and 2024, it retained a 9.44% stake (393,813 shares) valued at around ₩11.07 trillion. Its original 2018 investment of ₩201.4 billion in HYBE had appreciated considerably. Additionally, its stake in NCsoft rebounded from a ₩1.5 trillion write-down to an estimated ₩400 billion in value.

Also in July 2025, Netmarble considered issuing ₩2.5 trillion in exchangeable bonds (EB), backed by part of its HYBE stake, to repay debt incurred from its ₩2 trillion acquisition of SpinX. NH Investment & Securities was expected to underwrite the deal, supported by NH Hedge Asset Management and institutional investors. The company had previously used HYBE shares as collateral, including a 2023 block trade and a 2024 price return swap.

However, in August 2025, Netmarble canceled the EB issuance due to volatility in HYBE's stock price following an "owner risk" scandal involving HYBE founder Bang Si-hyuk. The bond proceeds were intended to reduce SpinX-related debt, which has since been cut from approximately ₩1.6 trillion to the mid-₩200 billion range.

In April 2026, Netmarble announced to invest additional 150 billion won to increase its equity stake in Coway from 26.13% to 29.1%. This strategic move is primarily designed to block activist fund Align Partners from challenging its board representation and altering corporate governance. Additionally, tightening its grip secures a highly profitable subscription "cash cow" that provides stable dividend income to hedge against Netmarble's volatile gaming business.

In August 2026, Netmarble Chairman Bang junhyuk acquired additional 13.4% stake in the company from Tencent for approximately 374 billion KRW using personally secured funds, which increases his total shareholding from 24.93% to 38.34%. According to the company, the transaction was designed to reinforce responsible management by the largest stakeholder and mitigate market uncertainties regarding potential large scale share liquidations. Both companies confirmed that their strategic partnership across global gaming and other business area will remain unaffected.

== Games ==
Year	Title	Developer	Publisher	Notes	Ref.
2001	Tomak: Save the Earth	Netmarble Monster	Netmarble		
2003	GunZ: The Duel	MAIET Entertainment	Netmarble	Publisher in Korea only	
2003	Grand Chase	KOG Studios	Netmarble	One of many publishers	
2007	SD Gundam Capsule Fighter Online	Softmax	Netmarble		
2008	Uncharted Waters Online	Koei Tecmo	Netmarble	Publisher in North America and Europe only	
2008	Prius Online	CJI	Netmarble		
2012	Scarlet Blade	Liveplex	Netmarble		
2012	District 187: Sin Streets	Netmarble	Netmarble		
2013	Monster Taming(how to train a monster)	Netmarble Monster	Netmarble	Released on August 13, ending on August 30 2023	
2014	Seven Knights	Netmarble Nexus	Netmarble		
2015	Marvel Future Fight	Netmarble Monster	Netmarble		
2016	Lineage 2: Revolution	Netmarble Neo	Netmarble		
2016	Knights Chronicle	Netmarble	Netmarble	Initially Japan only; released globally in June 2018; shut down on July 4, 2023	
2017	Star Wars: Force Arena	Netmarble Monster	Netmarble	Shut down on January 12, 2019	
2017	Arena of Valor	TiMi Studio Group	Netmarble	Publisher only in Korea	
2018	Jackpot World	SpinX Games	SpinX Games	SpinX Games was acquired by Netmarble in August 2021.	
2018	The King of Fighters All Star	Netmarble Neo	Netmarble	Shut down on October 30, 2024	
2018	BTS World	Takeone Company Corp	Netmarble		
2020	Seven Knights 2	Netmarble Nexus	Netmarble		
2020	Seven Deadly Sins: Grand Cross	Netmarble F&C	Netmarble		
2021	Marvel Future Revolution	Netmarble Monster	Netmarble	Shut down on August, 25th 2023.	
2022	Ni no Kuni: Cross Worlds	Netmarble Neo	Netmarble		
2023	Paragon: The Overprime	Netmarble F&C	Netmarble		
2023	Tower of God: New World	Netmarble	Netmarble	In all countries on July 27, 2023	
2024	Solo Leveling: Arise	Netmarble Neo	Netmarble		
2024	King Arthur: Legends Rise	Kabam	Netmarble	Shut down in March 2026	
2024	RAVEN2	Netmarble Monster	Netmarble	Sequel to Raven (2015); released worldwide in 2025	
2025	Game of Thrones: Kingsroad	Netmarble Neo	Netmarble		
2026	The Seven Deadly Sins: Origin	Netmarble F&C	Netmarble		
2026	Mongil: Star Dive	Netmarble Monster	Netmarble	Sequel to Monster Taming, Released on April 15	
2026	RF Online NEXT	Netmarble	Netmarble		
TBA	Shangri-La Frontier	Netmarble Nexus	Netmarble		
TBA	Pearl In Blue	Netmarble N2	Netmarble		
