= Bang Jun-hyuk =

South Korean businessman (born 1968)

- 방준혁
- Born: December 23, 1968 (age 57); Seoul, South Korea
- Education: High school dropout
- Occupation: Businessman
- Employer(s): Netmarble, Coway
- Title: Founder and Chairman of Netmarble; Chairman of Coway

Korean name
- Hangul: 방준혁
- RR: Bang Junhyeok
- MR: Pang Chunhyŏk

Bang Jun-hyuk (Korean: 방준혁; born December 23, 1968) is a South Korean businessman. The founder and chairman of the largest mobile gaming company in the country, Netmarble, he is among the richest people in South Korea. When Netmarble acquired Coway in 2019, he also became the chairman of Coway. In April 2024, Forbes estimated his net worth at US$1.01 billion and ranked him 40th richest in the country.

== Biography ==
Bang was born on December 23, 1968 in Seoul, South Korea. He was born into poverty. He claimed that, while he was in elementary school, he delivered newspapers to help support the family. In 1985, he dropped out after attending two years of high school and worked to help support his family. He was reportedly unsuccessful in much of his early career. He also reportedly was once the victim of a scam, and lost all of his money. At age 30, he founded an internet movie rental business, but the business failed. In 1999, founded an internet-related business that was popular but did not recoup its investment costs. Around this time, he heard that the video game developer Ipopsoft (아이팝소프트) was in crisis. While still a company outsider, he helped the company overcome its crisis by finding investors. When the company again went into crisis, he took over the company and reorganized it into Netmarble. Bang then oversaw Netmarble's rapid growth. After several initial successes, the company caught the attention of the conglomerate CJ Group, which agreed to acquire it in 2004. He stepped down from the company in 2006 due to unspecified health concerns (he later claimed to be exhausted), and took a hiatus for five years. He reportedly was attempting to start another gaming company before he was asked to return by CJ.

Upon his return to Netmarble, he shifted the business to focusing on the mobile gaming market. In 2015, Netmarble ranked 8th in app sales globally. In 2016, he owned around 32% of Netmarble stock. In May 2017, Netmarble went public after raising US$2.4 billion, which was the largest listing in the country in seven years. In 2017, he became the richest self-made billionaire in the country and the sixth richest in the country, then holding 24.47% of company stock.

Bang's business strategy has frequently intersected with his cousin, Bang Si-hyuk, the founder and chairman of HYBE Corporation. This familial connection served as a key catalyst for Netmarble's strategic investment in HYBE in 2018, which made Netmarble the second-largest shareholder of the entertainment agency. The synergy between the two executives further materialized after Netmarble acquired the home appliance rental company Coway; leveraging their close relationship, Coway was quickly able to secure the HYBE-managed global pop group BTS as its official brand ambassadors to spearhead its international marketing campaigns.

In August 2026, Bang acquired an additional 13.4% stake in Netmarble from Tencent for approximately US$313.6M using personal funds. This transaction significantly increased his total ownership in the company from 24.93% to 38.34%. Following the acquisition, both companies officially confirmed that they would maintain their strategic partnership in the global gaming market and other major business sectors. Bang made his first personal investment in Coway, purchasing approximately 110,000 shares on the open market for US$7.5M to secure a 0.16% individual stake.
