= King Arthur: Legends Rise =

2024 video game

- Developer: Kabam
- Publisher: Netmarble
- Engine: Unreal Engine 5
- Platforms: iOS, Android, Windows
- Release: November 27, 2024 (iOS, Android, Windows); January 21, 2025 (Steam)
- Genres: Squad-based role-playing, gacha
- Mode: Single-player with online elements (PvP)

King Arthur: Legends Rise was a free-to-play squad-based role-playing video game with turn-based combat, based on the legends of King Arthur, developed by Kabam and published by the South Korean company Netmarble. The game was released on November 27, 2024, for iOS, Android, and Windows with cross-platform play support; a Steam version followed on January 21, 2025. The game was shut down on March 12, 2026, less than a year and a half after its worldwide launch.

== Gameplay ==
King Arthur: Legends Rise was a squad-based role-playing game with a turn-based combat system: the player assembled a team of heroes from the Arthurian cycle (knights, mages, and other characters) and fought monsters and bosses, as well as competing in PvP modes. Acquiring new heroes and upgrading them followed a gacha model with in-app purchases.

The story was a dark reimagining of the classic legend: a young Arthur strikes a pact with Caliburn, a dragon imprisoned inside the sword Excalibur, and leads Camelot through an age of darkness, battling villains and ancient gods. The game was built on Unreal Engine 5.

== Development and release ==
The game was developed by the Vancouver-based studio Kabam, Netmarble's North American subsidiary known for Marvel Contest of Champions. Its trailer premiered at Summer Game Fest in June 2023; an open beta test began on June 29, 2023, in the United States, Australia, the Nordic countries, the Philippines, and Hong Kong. In late 2023 the game was in soft launch in selected markets.

The worldwide release date was announced in the fall of 2024 while pre-registration was still ongoing. The global launch took place on November 27, 2024, simultaneously on iOS, Android, and PC (via the Netmarble launcher) with crossplay support. The game was released on Steam on January 21, 2025.

== Shutdown ==
In December 2025, Netmarble announced the termination of the game's service, citing an internal review that had concluded further development was not viable. In-app purchases were disabled on December 9, 2025, and on March 12, 2026, the game's servers were permanently shut down and the game was removed from app stores. The game's official communities (Discord, website, social media pages) were scheduled to close on June 13, 2026. The game thus lasted less than 16 months after its worldwide launch.

== Reception ==
The South Korean gaming press received the game generally positively. Game Chosun reviewer Seong Su-an described the game as a "by-the-book collectible RPG aimed at connoisseurs of the genre", singling out the realistic graphics that set it apart from typical anime-styled collectible games and the relic system that allowed changing a character's playstyle; in his view, the Arthurian theme could become a "new weapon" for Netmarble in Western markets. Kim Ji-man of GameVu called the game a solid turn-based strategic RPG "with strong fundamentals", praising the generous reward system, which eased the pressure of monetization, and the variety of content, but criticized persistent crash bugs and a clumsy interface in need of an overhaul.

Fextralife's reviewer, in a first-impressions piece, called the game a "pleasant surprise" with sufficient mechanical depth, noting the quality of the graphics and its friendliness to free-to-play players, but pointed out that the combat system and progression structure did little to distinguish it from the many other gacha games in the genre.
