= Olive Young (company) =

Korean health and beauty retailer

CJ Olive Young Corporation
- Native name: 씨제이올리브영 주식회사
- Type: Subsidiary
- Industry: Retail
- Founded: October 2002; 24 years ago
- Headquarters: Seoul, South Korea
- Key people: Lee Seon-jeong (CEO)
- Parent: CJ Group
- Website: global.oliveyoung.com

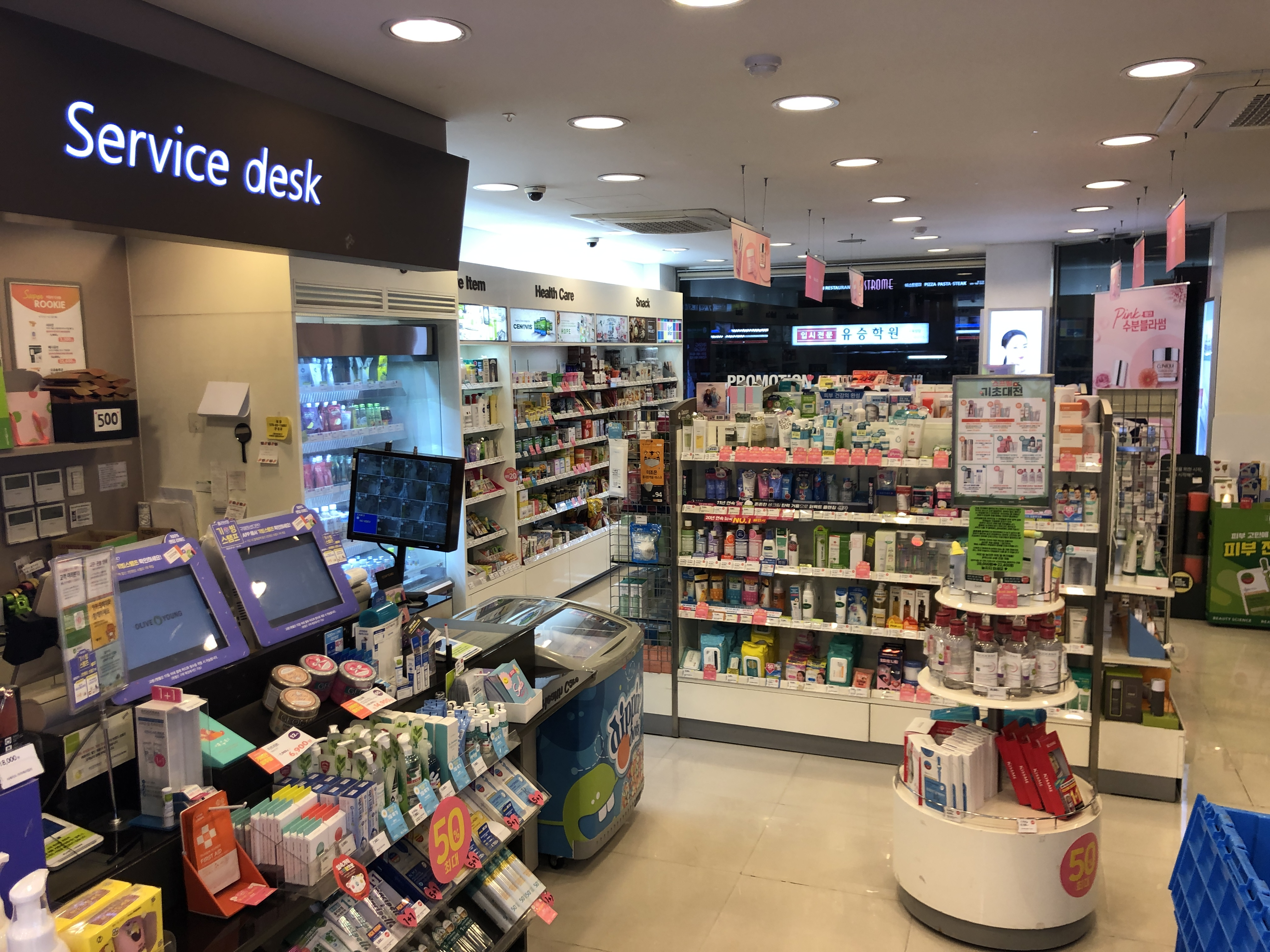
Inside the store

CJ Olive Young Corporation (Korean: 씨제이올리브영 주식회사) is a cosmetics, health and beauty product company and chain based in South Korea. Olive Young opened its first store in Sinsa-dong, Gangnam, Seoul, in December 1999, under the management of CJ Group, pioneered Korea's health and beauty market. Olive Young's main slogan is "All live young with Olive Young", which reflects the company's "Natural Healthy" philosophy. In 2021, Olive Young solidified its top position in the Korean health and beauty market, which had been negatively affected by the COVID-19 pandemic in South Korea.

== History ==
Olive Young's first store opened in 1999 in Sinsa. In 2002, the company established a joint venture with Dairy Farm International (DFI) Retail Group. The joint venture was terminated in 2008, when CJ Group completed its acquisition of all of DFI's stake in the joint venture.

The company started importing organic cosmetics from Juice Beauty, a US cosmetics brand, in 2009. The following year, it launched CJ ONE, an integrated membership service for CJ affiliates.

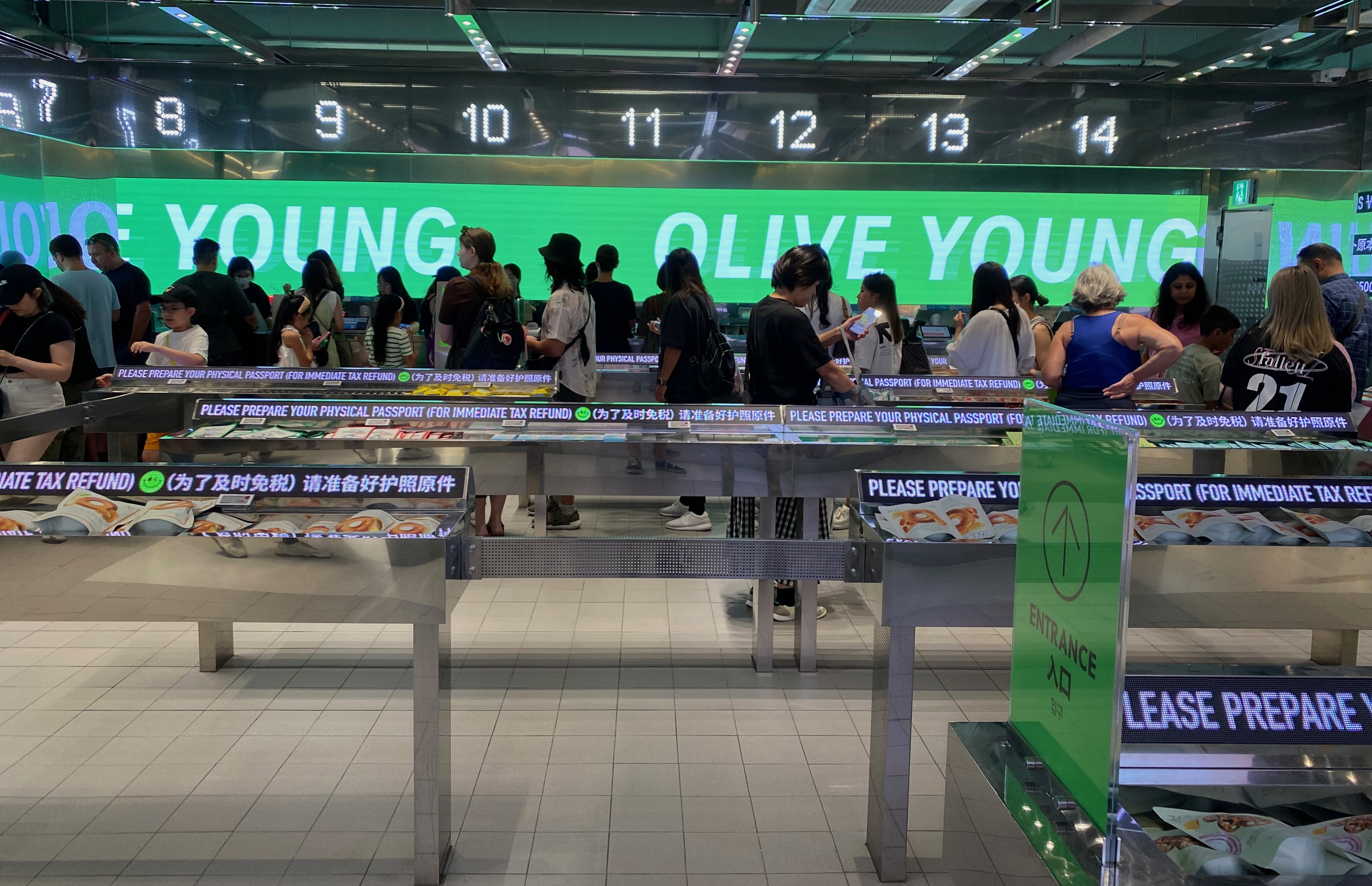
The checkout area of an Olive Young store in Myeongdong, Seoul

In December 2014, Olive Young merged with CJ Systems and changed its name to CJ Olive Networks Co., Ltd. It introduced the electronic shelf labeling system to its stores in 2018. Olive Young launched its Global Mall in 2019 in-tandem with a new brand slogan: "Global Lifestyle Platform to Propose Healthy Beauty". As of 2024, Olive Young operates more than 1,300 stores and also sells products online.

In January 2026, they announced a partnership with Sephora, with plans to have dedicated space in Sephora for Olive Young products. On May 29, 2026, they opened its first U.S. store in Pasadena, California.
