= China Factory (restaurant) =

Restaurant chain

- Industry: restaurants
- Founded: 1997
- Defunct: May 21, 2017
- Fate: Dissolved
- Headquarters: Seoul, South Korea
- Number of locations: 17 stores (2015)
- Subsidiaries: China Factory Delight
- Website: chinafactory.co.kr

China Factory (Korean: 차이나팩토리) was a Chinese cuisine restaurant chain based in South Korea and owned by the CJ Group. As of 2014, the chain had over 17 retail stores in South Korea.

The business closed its doors on May 21, 2017, however, China Factory Delight, a subsidiary, was still in business until March 25, 2018. The brand name only exists as part of a food court in the brand CJ foodworld.
