= Star Wars: Force Arena =

2017 video game

- Developer: Netmarble Monster
- Publisher: Netmarble
- Series: Star Wars
- Platforms: Android, iOS
- Release: January 12, 2017 shut down: January 12, 2019
- Genre: Strategy

Star Wars: Force Arena was a 2017 Star Wars-themed player versus player real-time strategy mobile game from Netmarble and Lucasfilm Games, involving characters and military units that appeared in all major Star Wars film installments released before 2019. Players command various Star Wars military units in a card-powered multiplayer online battle arena (MOBA). It was released on January 12, 2017, for Android and iOS.

It received generally favorable reviews according to review aggregator Metacritic. On the game's first anniversary, it had reached 6.5 million players. Servers were shut down on January 12, 2019, and the game was removed from digital storefronts. Critics praised the game's graphical and sound presentation. The gameplay received mixed reactions. Reviewers generally praised the MOBA aspects of the game, but were more critical of card collecting aspects. Some critics felt no need to spend money on the game, while others noted it suffered from pay-to-win mechanics prevalent in mobile games.

== Gameplay ==
Force Arena was a real-time strategy game that could also be played online as a multiplayer online battle arena.

Early versions of Force Arena were set in the Rebellion era of the Star Wars storyline. An update on August 14, 2017 added content from the Clone Wars era and a November 9, 2017 update included the New Republic era. Players control customized squads of characters and vehicles in a card-powered multiplayer online battle arena (MOBA) environment in the vein of Clash Royale, where the goal is to destroy the enemy squad's automatic defense turrets and shield generator to open their base to an airstrike. The myriad of playable squad leaders and unique assistants not only include characters that appear in the films, but also characters who appear in spin-off films, TV series, and Marvel-published comic books, like Rogue One, Star Wars Rebels and Star Wars: Princess Leia, as well as Star Wars: The Clone Wars, the Star Wars sequel trilogy and Solo: A Star Wars Story

Every squad is headed by a leader character, which has a special ability that the player can reuse at will after a certain amount of time passes, as well as some passive abilities. Many leaders also each have a unique counterpart, which may be a side character or even a spacecraft strafing run, which can only be used with the character with whom they are paired. When a leader is defeated, they will respawn near the shield generator after some time passes, during which the player is unable to deploy any cards. The respawn time penalty also increases for each subsequent defeat, up to a maximum of ten seconds.

== Development and legacy ==
Star Wars: Force Arena was developed by Korean studio Netmarble and published in conjunction with Lucasfilm Games. It was announced in November 2016, The game received a soft launch on November 4, 2016, in Australia and Singapore, where it was released under the title Star Wars: Battlegrounds. The game was later showcased in November at G-Star 2016. A full release followed on January 12, 2017, for iOS and Android. For Star Wars Day 2018 two 40th anniversary characters were released based on Ralph McQuarrie's concept art: Luke Skywalker and Darth Vader. On December 19, 2018, it was announced that the game would be shutting down on March 18, 2019. The game was no longer available for download after January 17, 2019, and the game shut down as scheduled.

== Reception ==
Reception

Aggregate score
Aggregator	Score
Metacritic	78/100

Review scores
Publication	Score
Gamezebo	4.5/5
Pocket Gamer	4/5

Star Wars: Force Arena received "generally favorable" reviews according to review aggregator Metacritic. On the game's first anniversary the developers revealed that the game had reached 6.5 million players.

Gameplay aspects received mixed impressions from critics. Reviewers generally praised the MOBA aspect of the game. iMore's Luke Filipowicz stated that "I always felt I had the opportunity to win, even in the matches where I would get trampled by my opponent." Android Central's Mark Lagace similarly lauded the battles, noting "the strategy and action it delivers in battle is as good as it gets." Harry Slater of Pocket Gamer noted that the three minute timed rounds lead "to some excellent, frantic battling." Other critics gave high marks for the game's short battles. Inversely the star card mechanics were often a point of criticism. Lagace noted that when aside from the MOBA battles Force Arena "is but another card collecting game." Some critics took note that the game did not require players to purchase cards with real-world currency in order to succeed. "I never felt the need to make in-game purchases" noted the reviewer from Yahoo! Life. iMore's Luke Filipowicz disagreed. "If you want to reach the top of the leaderboard, you'll have to spend money", he stated in his review.

The graphics and sound were universally praised by reviewers. GameZebo's Nick Tylwalk noted that "graphics are super sharp, especially impressive on the leader characters, and the music and sound effects are instantly recognizable." This sentiment was echoed by other critics. Android Central's Mark Lagace stated "Nailing the look and feel of Star Wars is important for fans, and this is easily the best-executed I've seen and heard on mobile." iMore's Luke Filipowicz appreciated that character designs are crisp and distinct, and that it was easy to differentiate between units on the battlefield.
