= Coway (company) =

South Korean appliance manufacturer

Coway Co., Ltd.
- Logo since 2020
- Native name: 코웨이
- Type: Public
- Traded as: KRX: 021240; WOWAX Component
- Industry: Home appliances
- Founded: 1989; 37 years ago
- Founder: Yoon Seok-keum
- Headquarters: Seoul, South Korea
- Key people: Bang Jun-hyuk (Chairman); Seo Jang-won (CEO)
- Revenue: ▲ ₩4,963.6 billion (2025)
- Operating income: ▲ ₩878.7 billion (2025)
- Net income: ▲ ₩617.5 billion (2025)
- Total assets: ▲ ₩5.762 trillion (2025)
- Total equity: ▲ ₩3.196 trillion (2025)
- Owner: Netmarble (26.95%) National Pension Service (7.51%) BNP Paribas (5.45%) Morgan Stanley (5.11%)
- Subsidiaries: Coway USA, Inc.; Coway Malaysia Sdn. Bhd.
- Website: coway.com

Coway Co., Ltd. (Korean: 코웨이) is an international manufacturer of household appliances, water purifiers, air purifiers, bidets, water softeners, and mattresses from South Korea. Founded and headquartered in Seoul, Coway is the largest water purifier, bidet, and mattress company in the country and owns subsidiaries in Malaysia, the United States, Thailand, Indonesia, Vietnam, Europe, Japan, and China. The company is listed on the Korea Exchange and owned by Netmarble since 2019.

== History ==
Woongjin Group founded the company under the name Woongjin Coway in 1989.

Beginning with water purifiers designed for the Korean market, Coway gained recognition with its product, the "Coway Water Purifier," launched in 1991. The company's commitment to innovation led to the introduction of the "COMPAC Water Purifier (CP-6025)" in 1992, followed by a foray into air purification in 1995. With strategic partnerships and research, Coway ascended to the number one spot in South Korea's air purifier and water filter markets by 1999.

Amid financial concerns, Woongjin Group sold its majority shares in Coway to the private equity fund MBK Partners in 2013, which remained the holding company of Coway until 2018.

Woongjin briefly reacquired its shares from MBK in late 2018 for 1.68 trillion won (1.4 billion dollars), renaming the company back to Woongjin Coway in the process. However, their shares in Coway were put in auction less than a year later. Initially, companies such as Carlyle Group, Haier Group and SK Networks placed bids, but all eventually withdrew. The bid was later sold to mobile game developer Netmarble for 1.74 trillion won, despite Woongjin initially attempting to sell its shares for more than 2 trillion. Netmarble remains the largest holding company of Coway to the present day.

When Netmarble pursued the acquisition of Coway in 2019, even before the buyout, workers—including the union of Coway's installation and repair technicians ("CS Doctors")—held sit-ins and protests in front of the headquarters, strongly demanding direct employment and job security guarantees. The massive conversion cost of approximately 120 billion KRW served as a key variable delaying the acquisition negotiations. Subsequently, the conflict intensified with a strike in January 2020. However, after months of negotiations, a tentative agreement and final settlement—including the conversion of about 1,500 workers to regular employees and welfare improvements—were reached. This concluded the 47-day strike, and the conflict was resolved as the workers returned to the field. Consequently, Coway established itself as the company with the second-largest increase in regular employment in 2021, trailing only behind Samsung Electronics.

In 2021, BTS was selected as the global brand ambassador. Coway actively operated businesses across various countries and regions, including Malaysia, the United States, Thailand, China, Indonesia, Vietnam, Japan, and Europe.

In early 2025, activist fund Align Partners Asset Management criticized Coway, arguing that despite its excellent cash-generating ability, the company adhered to an overly conservative shareholder return policy (with a return rate of about 20%) and maintained high-interest borrowings, thereby undermining capital efficiency. In response to this private pressure, Coway surprisingly increased its shareholder return rate from 20% to 40% in January 2025 and announced a share buyback and cancellation plan, sparking market momentum.

Ahead of the 2026 regular general shareholders' meeting, Align Partners Asset Management claimed that Coway's board of directors lacked independence from its largest shareholder (Netmarble). They officially demanded the exclusion of internal director Bang Jun-hyuk—who concurrently serves as the chairman of Netmarble and Coway—from reappointment. However, Coway flatly rejected this, stating, "Chairman Bang has proven overwhelming growth by leading digital transformation and global expansion." To represent the interests of minority shareholders, Align initiated a proxy fight by submitting shareholder proposals to appoint independent outside directors (Park Yoo-kyung and Shim Jae-hyung) and an audit committee member.

However, at the regular general shareholders' meeting held on March 31, 2026, the board's original proposals, including the reappointment of Chairman Bang Jun-hyuk, CEO Seo Jang-won, and CFO Kim Soon-tae, were all overwhelmingly passed, and Align's shareholder proposals were ultimately rejected. Still, during this process, Coway's board partially accepted the demands for governance improvement and completed an amendment to the articles of incorporation to introduce cumulative voting and electronic shareholders' meetings.

Although their proposals at the AGM were defeated, Align did not retreat; instead, they continued to purchase shares on the open market, announcing that they had increased their stake in Coway to 5.07%. Notably, they officially changed the purpose of their shareholding from simple investment to "influencing management rights," declaring a comprehensive, long-term pressure campaign against the board. In response to concerns over losing control, Netmarble issued a counter-disclosure for a stake defense, stating that it would purchase a total of 150 billion KRW worth of Coway shares on the open market over the next year to increase its stake to approximately 29%. The market assesses that the battle to secure stakes by the majority shareholder family against the offensive of the activist fund has fully entered a phase of long-term warfare.

Over time, the company has pursued global expansion, establishing its presence in various countries including Malaysia, the USA, Thailand, China, Indonesia, Vietnam, Japan, and Europe.

=== Coway Malaysia ===
Coway Malaysia is a subsidiary company of Coway mainly responsible for distributing Coway products in Malaysia. The subsidiary was founded in May 2006, with an initial investment of 5.8 million Malaysian ringgit. Coway Malaysia is the largest subsidiary of the parent company, making up over 70% of its overseas revenue, amounting to over 1,091.6 billion won (837 million dollars) in 2022.

== Products ==
Water Care: This includes water purifiers available in various configurations such as countertop, standing, and under-sink models.

Air Care: This division primarily focuses on air purifiers.

Body Care: This category includes bidets, massage chairs, and water softeners.

In addition to these core products, Coway provides services encompassing sterilization, cleaning, and self-management. The company also offers support services, especially for filter maintenance and troubleshooting.

== Design ==
The company has been recognized with several awards, including the Red Dot Design Award for 17 consecutive years.

In 2023, Coway also received accolades at the iF Design Awards.

== Financial overview ==
As of recent data, Coway's stock price stands at around $63, with a revenue of $3.31B (TTM) and a net income of $413M. Its growth rate has been recorded at 0.80%. In Q1 of 2026, Coway reported continued financial growth with a total revenue of KRW 1,329.7B, marking a 13.2% increase YoY. For the same quarter, its export (overseas) revenue was KRW 153.1B, representing a 2.6% decrease YoY.

== Logo History ==
1998–2013

2013–2016

2016–2020

2020–present

== R&D and technology ==
Coway's R&D center has been recognized as a CSA Qualified Witness Laboratory, a designated TÜV SÜD testing laboratory, a TSP (Technical Service Provider) by WQA (Water Quality Association), an international testing laboratory with accreditation from KOLAS (Korea Laboratory Accreditation Scheme), and a drinking water quality inspection agency by South Korea's Ministry of the Environment.

== Controversies ==
In 2016, three of Coway's ice cube maker models were discovered to leak trace amounts of nickel into its water. Allegedly, the company attempted to hide the defect from customers for a year. Coway was forced to recall models from an estimated 87 thousand customers in 2016, and several clients moved to file lawsuits against the company. Coway's CEO at the time, Kim Dong-hyun, was brought to resign from his position following the controversy as well.
