= Raven 2 =

- Developer: Netmarble Monster
- Publisher: Netmarble
- Engine: Unreal Engine
- Platforms: Android, iOS, Windows
- Release: KOR: May 29, 2024; TWN/HKG/MAC: November 20, 2024; JP: May 28, 2025; WW: October 22, 2025
- Genre: MMORPG
- Mode: Multiplayer

Raven 2 (Korean: 레이븐2) is a massively multiplayer online role-playing game (MMORPG) developed by Netmarble Monster and published by Netmarble. It is a sequel to the 2015 mobile action role-playing game Raven, released internationally as Evilbane: Rise of Ravens. Raven 2 launched in South Korea on May 29, 2024, simultaneously on Android, iOS and Windows with cross-platform play, and was subsequently rolled out region by region: to Taiwan, Hong Kong and Macau in November 2024, to Japan in May 2025, and worldwide across 150 countries on October 22, 2025.

The game was a commercial success in South Korea, entering the top three of the revenue charts on both major mobile app stores within days of release, and won the top prize in the multi-device category at Google Play Korea's Best of 2024 awards. Critics praised its graphics and cinematic cutscenes, but faulted its lack of differentiation from other Korean MMORPGs, its heavy reliance on automated combat, and its aggressive monetization.

== Gameplay ==
Raven 2 is a third-person massively multiplayer online role-playing game set in a dark fantasy world. The player creates a member of a "Special Corps" marked by a "Cursed Stigma", who investigates sinister phenomena and battles demons while gradually uncovering the fate of a decaying world. The story is delivered through cinematic cutscenes, and the game emphasizes a grim, mature aesthetic with graphic depictions of violence. Raven 2 supports cross-platform play, allowing the same character to be played on mobile devices and PC.

Six character classes were available at launch: the Night Ranger, the Berserker, the Divine Caster, the Vanguard, the Elementalist, and the Destroyer. The chosen class is permanently tied to the character and cannot be changed through normal play; some classes are gender-locked. Additional classes were introduced in later updates, including the Assassin, Deathbringer, Gunslinger and Warlord.

Combat is built around target selection and skill use, and the game allows combat, movement and questing to be fully automated. Character progression involves acquiring and upgrading equipment, collecting items that grant permanent stat bonuses, a "Holy Garment" system of stat-boosting costumes of varying rarity tiers, familiars, and stigma branding. The game features guilds with their own dungeons, crafting and donation systems, daily dungeons, field bosses, and large-scale guild-versus-guild battles; a player-to-player marketplace unlocks at character level 55.

Raven 2 is free-to-play with in-game purchases, including paid equipment summons, season passes and a monthly subscription; the developers recommended that players wanting to limit their spending prioritize the pass and subscription.

== Development ==
The original Raven, published by Netmarble in partnership with the web portal Naver in 2015, topped the App Store and Google Play revenue charts in South Korea, reached one million daily active users within 40 days, and won six prizes at the 2015 Korea Game Awards, including the grand prize. The game was renamed Evilbane: Rise of Ravens for its international release.

A sequel was first announced on January 27, 2022, at Netmarble's 5th Netmarble Together with Press (NTP) showcase under the working title Raven: Arang, as one of twenty new projects. It was presented as a cross-platform MMORPG from Netmarble Monster, intended to retain the original's signature action while adding the multiplayer modes and large-scale battles the first game lacked. The project was later given the final title Raven 2.

The game was directed by Cho Doo-hyun. According to Cho, nine years after the original the team sought to expand the series' universe while keeping the game accessible for busy players, prioritizing "familiar enjoyment" over complexity. The game was built on Unreal Engine with a focus on cinematic storytelling.

== Release ==
Pre-registration in South Korea opened on April 19, 2024, and had surpassed one million sign-ups by launch. Ahead of the Korean release, the game held an open beta test in Thailand and Canada, topping the Thai App Store's popularity and revenue charts. On May 22, 2024, Netmarble held a livestreamed showcase with popular streamers in which gameplay was shown publicly for the first time. The game launched in South Korea on May 29, 2024.

On November 20, 2024, Raven 2 launched in Taiwan, Hong Kong and Macau, alongside the opening of "Noah", the game's first global server shared between South Korea and the new regions. The game launched in Japan on May 28, 2025. In September 2025, Netmarble announced a worldwide release, which took place on October 22, 2025, making Raven 2 available in 150 countries in 16 languages. The global service is divided into three regions — North America, Southeast Asia and Oceania, and Europe — each comprising two "worlds" of twelve servers; the PC version is distributed through Epic Games Store and Netmarble's own launcher.

The game has received regular major updates. The first new class, the Assassin, was added to the Korean version in October 2024. In May 2025, for the game's first anniversary, the Deathbringer class was added along with "Pia", a unified world shared by players from all five serviced regions. A November 2025 update introduced the Gunslinger class and the accelerated "Legend" world. In May 2026, for the second anniversary, Netmarble opened ZERO, the game's first special-ruleset server, and added the Warlord, a spear-wielding commander class. A July 2026 update added the new Valtar region and a skill development system.

== Reception ==
=== Critical response ===
Raven 2 received mixed reviews. Hong Su-min of Gametoc praised its "console-quality" cinematic cutscenes, solid graphics and consistently grim aesthetic, but criticized the weak delivery of a predictable story and the near-total absence of differentiation from other competitive Korean MMORPGs. She noted that because of the game's predetermined-hit combat system, manual control quickly becomes meaningless and play devolves into watching automated combat, while the odds of obtaining top items from paid summons run to hundredths of a percent. Korean outlets broadly characterized the game as well-made but "too familiar a taste".

Western critics after its global launch wrote similar reviews. Writing for Massively Overpowered, a columnist called Raven 2 "beautiful and gruesome", praising its visuals and combat presentation, but argued that its automated combat "goes too far": automation is the game's foundation rather than a convenience, and within minutes the player is simply watching the character do everything on its own.

=== Sales ===
Raven 2 performed well at launch in South Korea. It had risen to second place on the Korean App Store revenue chart within two days, and within a week it entered the top three grossing games on Google Play and the top ten on both major app stores. More than half of the game's revenue came from its PC version. In the third quarter of 2024, Raven 2 accounted for 6% of Netmarble's total revenue, and together with Solo Leveling: Arise was one of the new releases credited with improving the company's results.

=== Accolades ===
In November 2024, Raven 2 won the top prize in the multi-device category at Google Play Korea's Best of 2024 awards, which recognizes games offering the best cross-platform experience; Netmarble's share price rose 4% following the announcement.
