= Marvel Future Revolution =

2021 video game

- Developer: Netmarble Monster
- Publisher: Netmarble
- Engine: Unreal Engine 4
- Platforms: Android, iOS
- Release: WW: August 25, 2021
- Genre: Action role-playing
- Modes: Single-player, multiplayer

Marvel Future Revolution was an action role-playing game developed by Netmarble Monster and published by Netmarble. It was released for Android and iOS on August 25, 2021. The game's storyline is based on the Secret Wars series and is set on the Primary Earth, a patchwork world of alternate Earths such as the ones ruled by Hydra Empire or settled by Asgardians. Because of the game's multiversal nature, many alternate versions of prominent Marvel characters also appear, often interacting with one another.

On October 27, 2022, it was announced that they would be reducing the scale of service. On June 2, 2023, Netmarble announced that the game would shut down and that in-app purchases would be disabled. The game was shut down on August 25, 2023, exactly two years after its launch.

== Plot ==
Earths from different realities are colliding, destroying each other. The heroes of one Earth attempt to stop this "Convergence" but fail. When all hope is lost, Vision sacrifices himself to merge several Earths together peacefully into a single Primary Earth. The new planet is unstable however, and the Convergence is still ongoing. To maintain their new world and seek a permanent solution to the Convergence, the Omega Flight is formed from heroes of different Earths.

The player's character is recruited into the Omega Flight by their counterpart from the technologically advanced New Stark City. After stopping the threat of Ultron from another Earth, they fight to oppose the invasion of Thanos from yet another reality into the regions of Hydra Empire and Xandearth. When Doctor Strange attempts to try and use the Yggdrasil as the solution to Convergence, the task of bringing the last seed of the World Tree back to life takes the player to the regions of Midgardia, Sakaar, and the Dark Domain.

== Gameplay ==
A game screenshot showing game menus, controls, the player's character (Captain Marvel), an NPC, an interactable item and enemies in the background

The players control their characters in a three-dimensional world, navigating the environment, attacking enemies and interacting with NPCs and quest objectives. The enemies come in regular ("villain") and boss ("supervillain") varieties, the latter of which boast significant defenses and utilize special powerful attacks. Each character has access to 32 skills grouped into 8 categories, but other than Basic and Ultimate, only 5 skills out of 32 can be equipped at any given time. The game has an "auto-play" mode, in which characters will attack enemies, utilize medpacks and even advance quest objectives independently from the player's input; for sufficiently powerful characters this can be enough to complete all but the hardest game content. Apart from gaining experience and advancing in levels, the players have many other ways to improve their characters, such as upgrading skills, equipping Omega Cards and Battle Badges, slotting Energy Cores and Companions, upgrading Potential and Specialization and advancing the Squad Rank bonuses, the latter of which apply for all of their characters. Each character has access to 15-20 different equipment sets, most of which come with a variety of 7-10 color schemes; players can mix-and-match pieces of different outfits and colors to create unique looks, independent of the gear with most desired game stats.

Upon the completion of the main storyline benchmarks, additional gameplay modes become available, such as daily group missions (Blitz, Raid, Special Operation), Weekly Solo objectives (Battle Challenge, Training Grounds) and PVP (Dimensional Duel, Dark Zone, Omega War).

=== Characters ===
The game launched with eight playable characters: including Black Widow, Captain America, Captain Marvel, Doctor Strange, Iron Man, Spider-Man, Star-Lord and Storm. Magik was added as the first post-release playable character on December 15, 2021, followed by Scarlet Witch in May 2022 and later in September, Wolverine joined the game.

Players get enough slots to activate over half of the characters for free, while the rest can be unlocked using in-game currency. Due to the material-consuming nature of character advancement, focusing all effort into a single "main" character will yield the best results. However, leveling other characters is still beneficial, providing boosts and material that can be used on the "main" character, while all equippable items can be transferred over to another characters, should the player wish to switch their "main".

== Development ==
Marvel Future Revolution was developed and published by Netmarble. It had previously released Marvel: Future Fight in 2015.

== Release ==
The game was announced on March 1, 2020, entered Open Beta in select regions on July 1, 2021, and was released globally on August 25 later that year.

Two editions of the game soundtrack have been published by Hollywood Records: "The Convergence Soundtrack" containing 42 tracks was released on August 25, 2021 and "World Orchestra Soundtrack", a selection of 17 tracks performed live by the Beethoven Academy Orchestra and Video Game Orchestra was also released on May 27, 2022.

Netmarble announced in June 2023 that the game would shut down on August 25, 2023.

== Reception ==
Reception

Aggregate score
Aggregator	Score
Metacritic	78/100

The game received generally positive reviews on release. Kayleigh Partleton of Pocket Tactics gave the game an 8/10 score, complimenting smooth and fluid combat, a great variety in character customization and graphics performance comparable to that of a console game. Jack Brassel of Hardcore Droid also complimented the "amazing" graphics and smooth and engaging combat, while noting that in the end Future Revolution is still a mobile game and follows the tradition of prominent in-app purchases, settling on a final 4.5/5 rating.

Eric Halliday was more critical in his review, noticing several plot holes within the story and voicing his disappointment in limited character selection of only 8, compared to 272 available in Marvel Future Fight by then. He did however compliment the "solid" controls, "gorgeous" graphics in both environments and character costumes, and the voice acting of main characters and creative action in the cutscenes, giving the game an overall 7.5.

Future Revolution won the "Innovation" award at Apple Design Awards 2022.
