= Tous les Jours =

South Korean bakery chain

- Type: Public
- Founded: 1997
- Parent: CJ Group
- Website: http://www.tlj.co.kr/

Tous les Jours (stylized TOUS les JOURS; Korean: 뚜레쥬르) is a South Korean bakery franchise owned by CJ Foodville, a business group of CJ Group. Tous les Jours means "every day" in French. Tous les Jours is a Korean bakery-café primarily serving a selection of baked goods and beverages. As of 2021, it has more than 1,650 locations worldwide.

== History ==
Tous les Jours was established in 1996, with its inaugural store opening in Guri, South Korea in September 1997. The company established a frozen dough facility in Um-Sung, South Korea in November 1997, starting mass production and distribution. In September 1998, the Tous Les Jours company began franchise licensing to the public.

Tous les Jours opened its 100th store in April 1999, and its 300th store in June 2001. In May 2002, the stores began offering coffees, sandwiches, fruit juices, and other beverages in addition to baked goods. The company switched to a "café-style bakery business model" in January 2003. Tous les Jours opened its 1000th store in July 2008.

== International ==
By April 2015, Tous les Jours had over 160 stores outside of Korea.

=== United States ===
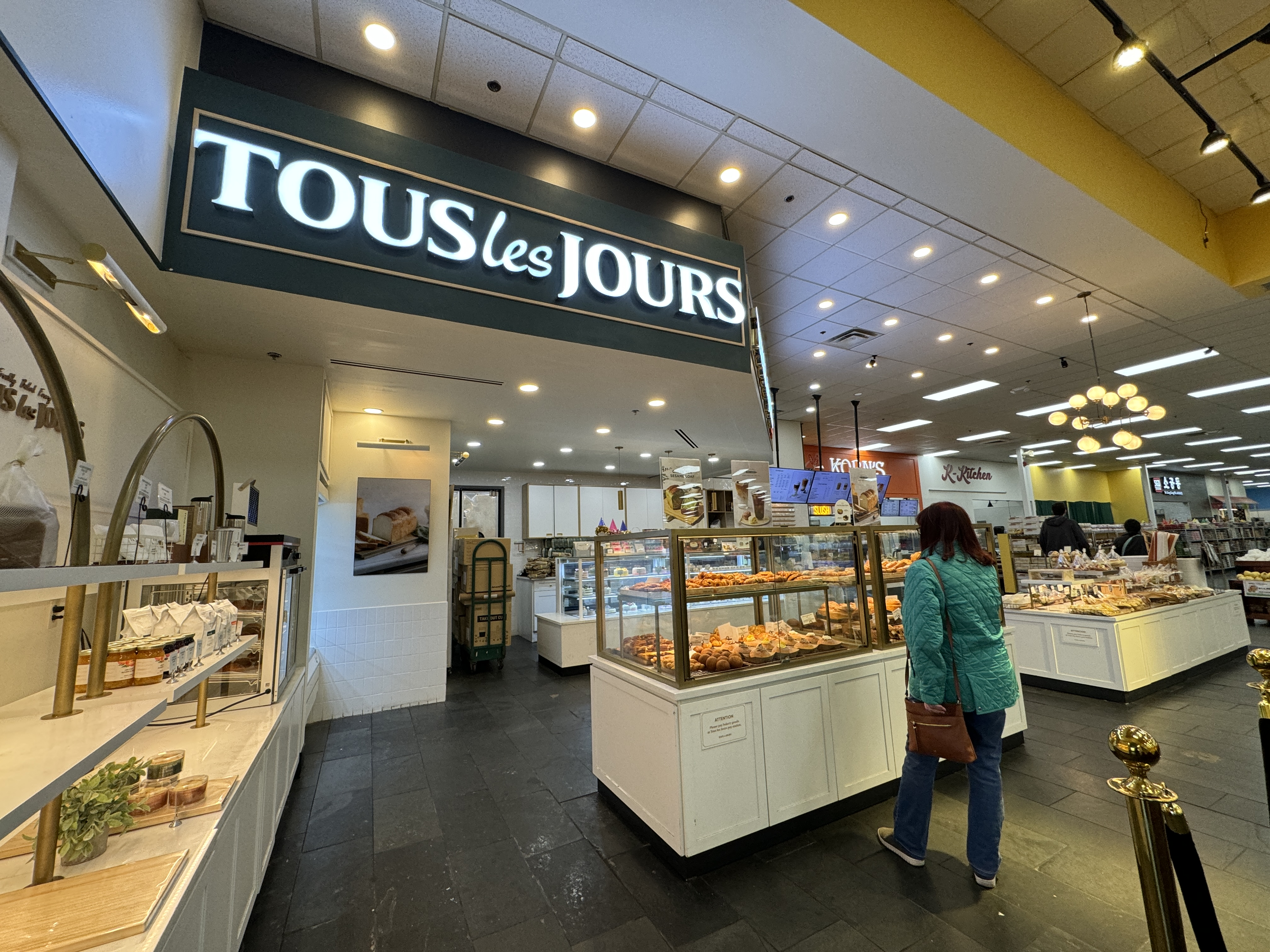
A Tous les Jours store in Indianapolis, Indiana.

In April 2004, Tous les Jours opened its first stores in the United States.

=== China ===
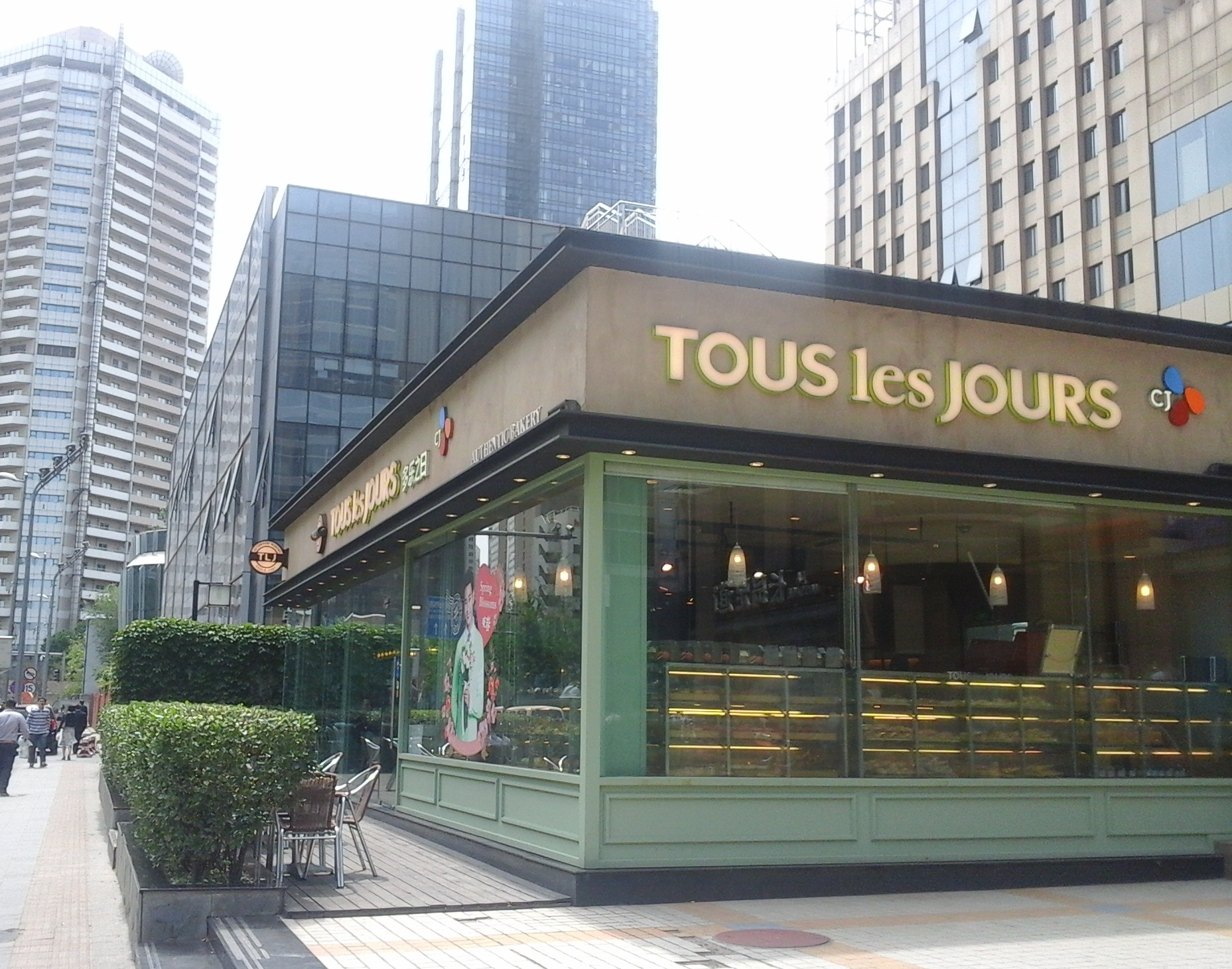
A Tous les Jours franchise in Beijing, China, with the parent company (CJ) logo visible.

In August 2005, it opened its first store in China.

=== Vietnam ===
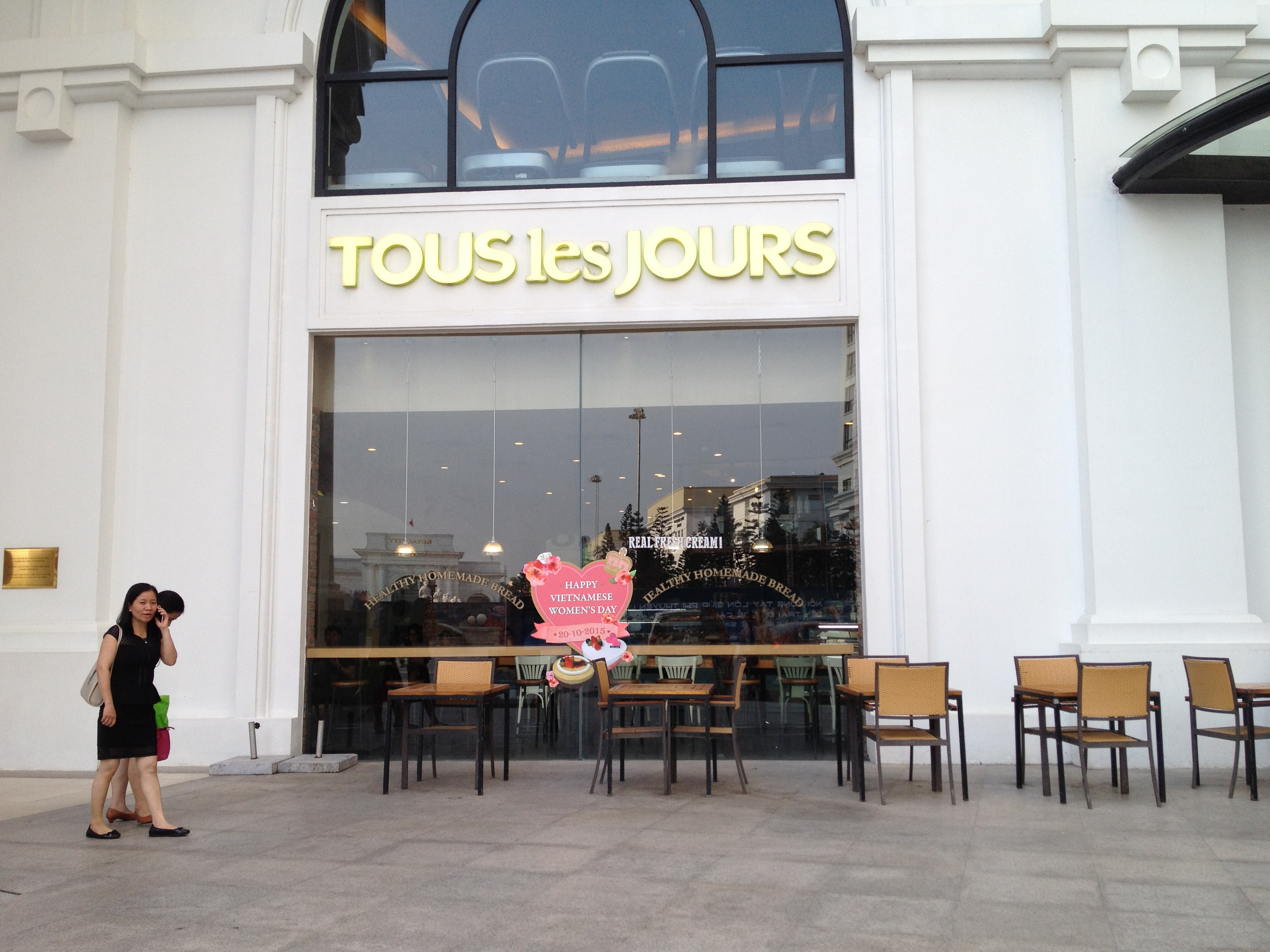
A Tous les Jours store in Hanoi, Vietnam.

In June 2007, it opened its first store in Ho Chi Minh City in Vietnam.

=== Indonesia ===
Tous les Jours' initial store in the country was opened in 2011. Since then it has grown to over 52 stores across the Jabodetabek area as well as other major cities of Indonesia such as Semarang, Bandung, Medan, and Denpasar. In 2018, CJ Foodville announced that it will invest Rp100 billion on the construction of a factory in the Karawang area to support Tous les Jours operations in the country.

On November 21, 2019, a Tous les Jours branch in Pacific Place, South Jakarta was accused of religious discrimination for its refusal to write non-Islamic holiday messages (such as those relating to Christmas, Valentine's Day and Chinese New Year) on cakes ordered by customers and instead offered a plain one instead for the customer to decorate it themselves.

Tous les Jours obtained a Halal certificate for all of its products in 2020.

=== Philippines ===
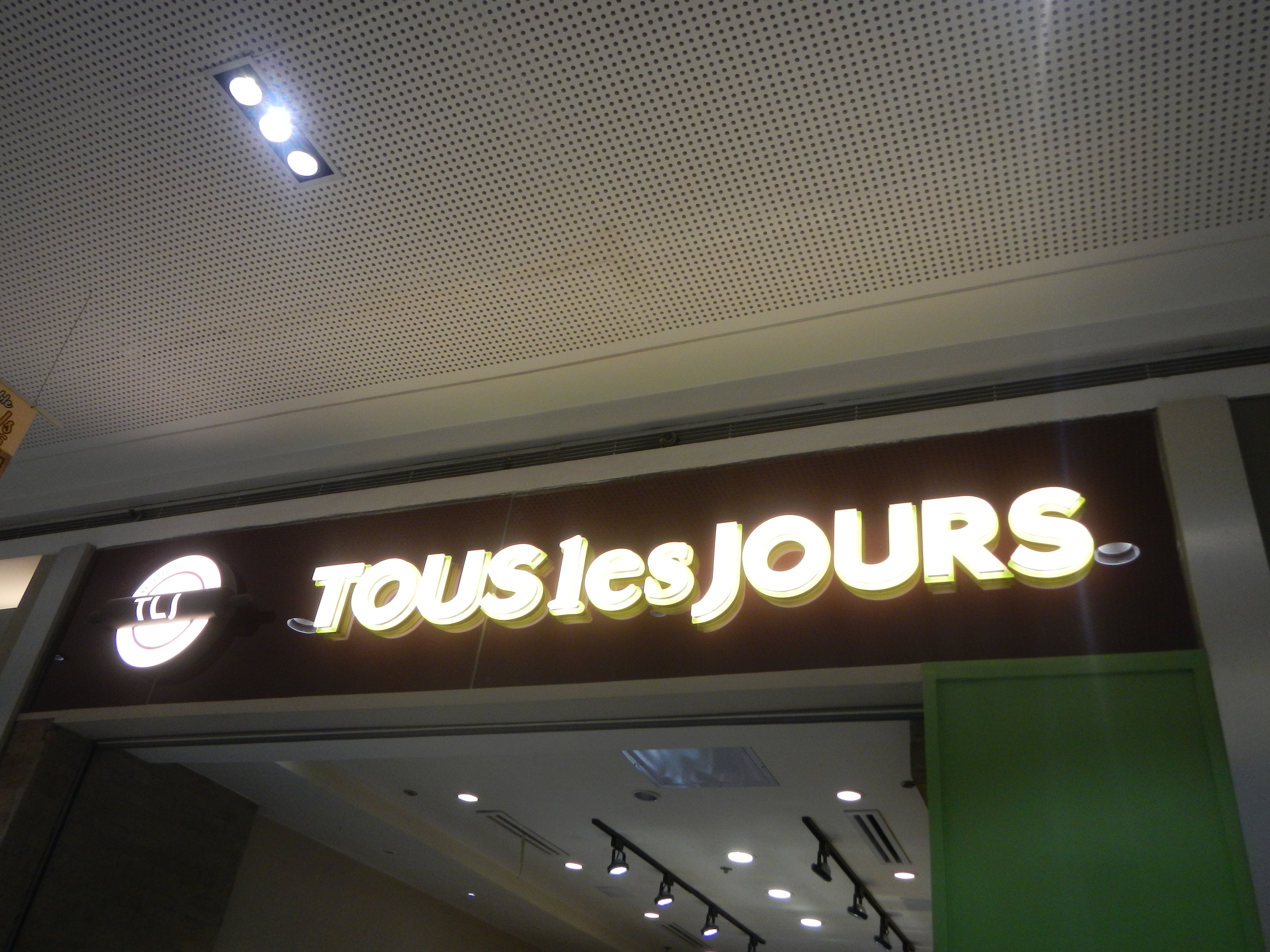
A Tous les Jours store in Manila, Philippines.

On November 11, 2011, Tous les Jours inaugurated its first store in the Philippines with 6 branches in total across Metro Manila, including its flagship store located in SM North EDSA.

=== Malaysia ===
On June 23, 2013, Tous les Jours opened its first store in Malaysia in Kuala Lumpur. On May 25, 2017, Tous les Jours abruptly announced the closure of all four stores in Malaysia. On 8 January 2025, it was reported that the company will return its business to the country with the opening of five outlets in 2025.

=== Cambodia ===
On November 3, 2014, Tous les Jours opened its first store in Cambodia.

=== Mongolia ===
On October 31, 2016, Tous les Jours opened its first store in Mongolia in the nation’s capital Ulaanbaatar. As of December 9, 2025, Tous les Jours Mongolia has 22 outlets across Ulaanbaatar.

=== Singapore ===
Tous les Jours opened its first store in Singapore at Northpoint City in December 2024.

== See also ==
- Paris Baguette
- Sungsimdang
