= A Twosome Place =

South Korean coffeehouse chain

- Industry: Food service
- Founded: 2002; 24 years ago, South Korea
- Headquarters: 170, Euljiro, Jung District, Seoul, South Korea
- Number of locations: 1,750 stores (2026)
- Owner: The Carlyle Group, through Trinity Holdings, L.P. (100%)
- Parent: CJ Foodville (CJ Group; 2002–2020); Anchor Equity Partners (2020–2021); The Carlyle Group (since 2021)
- Website: twosome.co.kr

A Twosome Place (Korean: 투썸플레이스) is a South Korean coffeehouse chain specializing in coffee and desserts. Since the opening of its first store in Sinchon, Seoul, in 2002, the brand has grown to approximately 1,700 locations nationwide as of June 2025. Following the launch of its franchise business in 2008, A Twosome Place was established as an independent corporation in February 2018 through a spin-off from CJ Foodville's coffee business. In November 2021, the company was acquired by the Carlyle Group, a U.S.-based global investment firm.

== Name meaning ==
The name "Twosome" reflects the brand's focus on pairing coffee with dessert items, particularly cakes.

== History ==
A Twosome Place, created in 2002 by CJ Foodville, opened its first store in Sinchon, Seoul, and it launched its franchise model in 2008, with a store in Sinsa, Gangnam. In 2010, it opened its 100th location, and a year later, it expanded into the Chinese market. By the end of 2017, it had 45 stores in that country. Also in 2017, A Twosome Place signed a partnership with Singapore's TWG Tea, adding its products to its menu. In 2018, the brand was spun off from CJ Foodville. In 2021, it was acquired by the American private equity firm the Carlyle Group. Despite the financial shock of the COVID-19 pandemic (2020–2022), A Twosome Place was the only coffeehouse chain in South Korea to record a profit. However, that year, it was forced to liquidate its Chinese subsidiary, A Twosome Shanghai. By the end of 2025, the company operated more than 1,700 stores across South Korea. That year, the "Twosome 2.0" concept was created, featuring an updated store design. The company operates a research and development center, and it has a proprietary Mobile application, called Twosome Heart.

=== Milestones ===
- 2002: Opening of the first A Twosome Place store in Sinchon, Seoul
- 2008: Launch of franchise business
- 2010: Opening of 100th store
- 2016: Opening of the first drive-thru location
- 2018: Spun off from CJ Foodville as an independent corporation
- 2021: Acquisition by the Carlyle Group
- 2025: Achievement of 1,700-store mark, nationwide
- 2026: Opened first international store, in Old Town Alexandria, Virginia, United States, under the name Twosome Place.

== Products ==
A Twosome Place offers a range of coffee and dessert pairings. Its cake lineup includes Spoonable Abak, introduced in 2015, and Strawberry Chocolate Cream Cake.

With the opening of its first U.S. location in October 2026, the company plans to introduce some of its signature cake offerings to the U.S. market, along with Korean-inspired menu items such as Black Sesame Cake and Latte, Injeolmi Cake, and Dalgona Cake and Cream Top.

== See also ==
- List of coffeehouse chains
