= Scarlet Blade (video game) =

2012 video game

- Developer: Liveplex
- Publishers: AS: Netmarble; NA: Aeria Games
- Platform: Microsoft Windows
- Release: AS: 2012; NA: March 27, 2013
- Genre: MMORPG
- Mode: Multiplayer

Scarlet Blade (in Europe and America) and Queen's Blade (in Asia) was a sci-fi/fantasy adult massively multiplayer online role-playing game (MMORPG) by Korean developer Liveplex, released in Asia in 2012. It was localized to English by Aeria Games and released to the West in March 2013. The game closed in March 2016 due to economical and technical reasons.

== Development ==
Siliconera first-covered the game in December 2011. They expected the first closed-beta test to occur in Q1 2012. Initially, the game had female only playable characters of six classes (Defender, Medic, Punisher, Sentinel, Shadow Walker, Whipper). The first and sole male playable class (Cyberblade) was later added.
