= VIPS (South Korean restaurant) =

South Korean restaurant chain

- Industry: Restaurant
- Founded: 1997 in South Korea
- Headquarters: Seoul, South Korea
- Number of locations: 112 stores (2015)
- Website: ivips.co.kr

VIPS (Korean: 빕스) is a restaurant chain in South Korea owned by the CJ Foodville of CJ Group.

== History ==
=== In South Korea ===
The first store was opened in 1997 in Deungchon, Seoul.

As of 2015, the chain had 112 branches in South Korea. The number of stores, however, decreased sharply in the next few years; it decreased to 61 in 2018 and 45 in December 2019. VIPS recognized the crisis, and attempted various changes for sales growth through changing the store concepts and interior relevant to the targets that live near the store.

=== In China ===
In 2015 CJ Foodville announced a plan to set up 100 restaurants in China by 2017.
