= CJ Group =

South Korean conglomerate holding company

CJ
- Logo
- Trade name: CJ
- Formerly: Cheil Sugar Co., Ltd. (1953–1979); Cheil Jedang Corporation (1979–2002); CJ Co., Ltd (2002–2007)
- Type: Public
- Traded as: KRX: 001040
- Industry: Conglomerate
- Founded: November 5, 1953; 73 years ago
- Founder: Lee Byung-chul
- Headquarters: 12, Sowol-ro 2-gil, Jung-gu, Seoul (THE CENTER)
- Area served: Worldwide
- Key people: Lee Jay-hyun (chairman); Sohn Kyung Shik (chairman); Miky Lee (vice-chairwoman)
- Revenue: KRW 45,018.8 billion (2025)
- Owner: Estate of Lee Jay-hyun (47.07%); CJ Group through treasury stock (7.26%)
- Subsidiaries: CJ CheilJedang; CJ Foodville; CJ Freshway; CJ Logistics; CJ OliveYoung; CJ ENM; CJ CGV; TVING; Studio Dragon; 4DPLEX
- Website: www.cj.net

CJ Corporation (Korean: CJ 주식회사), doing business as CJ Group (Korean: CJ그룹) or simply CJ, is a South Korean conglomerate holding company, operating internationally. It is one of the largest chaebol headquartered in Seoul, South Korea. It comprises numerous businesses in various industries of Food & Food Service, Bio, Logistics & Retail, Entertainment & Media. Cheil Jedang, founded in 1953 as Samsung's first manufacturing business, was later separated from the Samsung Group, becoming independent in 1996.

The initials “CJ” derive from “Cheil Jedang,” the former English rendering of 제일제당.

Notable CJ affiliates include CJ CheilJedang (Food & Food Service), CJ Logistics (Logistics), CJ Olive Young (Health & Beauty Stores), CJ ENM (Entertainment & Media), and CJ CGV (Cinema Chain). The group is chaired by Lee Jay-hyun, the eldest grandson of Samsung founder Lee Byung-chul.

== History ==
=== 1953 to 1970 ===
CJ was founded as 'CheilJedang Co., Ltd.' in August 1953 as a sugar and flour manufacturer and was originally part of Samsung Group, as its first manufacturing business. In 1958, it opened the first flour mill in South Korea and in 1962, started exporting sugar to Okinawa, Japan. In 1965, CheilJedang's sugar business was branded as 'Beksul'. The company entered into the seasoning market in 1963 with Mipoong, competing against Miwon, the then-best-seller by Daesang.

=== 1971 to 1990 ===
In the 1970s, CJ continued its growth as a Food & Food Service company. In 1973 CJ entered into the feed business, launching 'Pungnyeon Feed'. In 1975, CJ developed mass-production techniques for "Dashida", a seasoning product, as well as technology for the mass-production of nucleic acids for the first time in South Korea in 1977, launching first market its first nucleic acid seasoning, "AIMEE". In 1979, the company was renamed 'CheilJedang Corp.' and started producing cooking oil under Beksul.

In the 1980s, CJ expanded to processed food items such as beverages and frozen foods, and entered the bio business based on new advanced technologies. In 1984, CJ established Eugene Tech International, a local subsidiary, in New Jersey, U.S. as a joint venture project. In 1986 CJ's Biotechnology & Pharmaceutics division succeeded in becoming the third in the world to develop Alpha-interferon, an anticancer medicine, as well as launching 'Hepaccine-B', a hepatitis vaccine. It entered the frozen food industry and launched its beverage business in 1987. With the establishment of CheilJedang Indonesia in 1988, the construction of a MSG plant in 1990, and a Lysine plant in 1991, CJ started reaching markets outside South Korea.

=== 1991 to 2016 ===
In the 1990s, CJ went through periods of conversion and growth as it transitioned into the area of life and culture from focusing on the food and bio industry. However, it continued to develop new food products such as 'Condition', a supplemental drink that alleviates hangover symptoms, in 1992 and 'Hetbahn', an aseptic packaged rice, in 1996. In July 1993, CheilJedang spun off from Samsung and gained independent management, changing into a life and culture group by entering into the food service and entertainment industries. In 1996 it became 'CheilJedang Group' and completed its official separation from Samsung Group in February 1997.

Since then, CJ has entered into the fields of media, entertainment, finance and information & communication businesses mainly through M&As of companies such as Mnet, a music cable channel, and Cheil Investment & Securities in 1997, and establishments of new affiliates such as Cheil Golden Village (currently CGV) in 1996, Dreamline (which was sold off in 2001), jointly with Korea Expressway in 1997, CJ GLS (currently CJ Logistics) in 1998, CJ O Shopping, CJ Europe and CJ FD (standing for food distribution) in 1999. In addition, CJ opened VIPS, a premium steak & salad bar, in 1997, and launched South Korea's first multiplex theater, CGV, in 1998.

In October 2002, CJ Group was launched and the official name of the company changed to 'CJ Co., Ltd'. In September 2007, CJ Co., Ltd. was reorganized into CJ Corporation, the holding company, and CJ CheilJedang, the operating company for food and biotechnology businesses. It consists of four main core businesses: Food & Food Service, Bio, Logistics & Retail, Entertainment & Media.

Korean billionaire Lee Jay-Hyun has been chairman of CJ Group since March 2002. His older sister Lee Mi-kyoung is the vice chairman of the company.

In 2010, CJ Media, CJ Entertainment, Mnet media, On-Media and CJ Internet merged to form O Media Holdings, which became CJ E&M in March 2011. Since then, CJ E&M has been a significant player in the development of Korean pop culture and the spread of "Korean Wave" (Korean: Hallyu), through the creation of successful TV programs such as "Superstar K", "Respond 1997", and films such as "Masquerade" and 2020 Academy Awards winner "Parasite."

Since introducing the first multiplex theaters, CGV, in 1998 to South Korea, the company has been developing what it calls "cultureplex", a space where eateries, performance halls, shops and multiplex theaters come together to provide a richer cultural experience to consumers, CGV Cheongdam Cine City, which opened in 2011 being an example.

=== 2017 to Present ===
After Chairman Lee Jay-Hyun resumed management duties in 2017, CJ Group accelerated its business restructuring and global expansion. In November 2017, CJ CheilJedang consolidated its four business divisions — bio, feed & livestock, food, and materials — into two: bio and food. In the same year, it acquired Selecta, a Brazil-based producer of concentrated soy protein. In 2018, CJ Healthcare was sold to Kolmar Korea. In July of the same year, CJ E&M and CJ O Shopping were merged to form CJ ENM (CJ Entertainment and Merchandising).

In August 2018, CJ CheilJedang acquired Kahiki Foods, an American frozen food company based in Columbus, Ohio, and in 2019, it acquired another American frozen food company, Schwan's. In November 2021, CJ ENM acquired Endeavor Content, the production company behind the film "La La Land," which was rebranded as FIFTH SEASON in 2022.

==== Global expansion ====
CJ Group has been described as a key contributor to the global Korean Wave (Hallyu), expanding the reach of K-food, K-content, and K-beauty across major international markets including the US, Japan, Europe, and China.

===== Food & Food Service =====
CJ CheilJedang, a core affiliate of CJ Group, has been expanding its global food business under the bibigo brand. In 2019, CJ CheilJedang acquired Schwan’s Company, a major frozen food company in the United States, for about $1.84 billion to expand its North American distribution and manufacturing capabilities. In 2025, CJ announced the completion of a new bibigo dumpling plant in Chiba Prefecture, Japan, to accelerate localization and better serve the growing Japanese market demand. In addition, the company is constructing new production facilities in Hungary by 2026 and in South Dakota, U.S., by 2027, to meet growing global demand for K-food products.

CJ Foodville, another affiliate of CJ Group, has launched bakeries and restaurants globally. Starting with opening a TOUS les JOURS store, a bakery chain, in Los Angeles in 2004, CJ has launched the chain also in China and Vietnam, where double-digit sales growth is maintained. The first TOUS Les JOURS in Ho Chi Minh, Vietnam, opened in 2007, and in December 2012, the 20th and 21st TOUS les JOURS opened in New Jersey and New York. Also brands of Foodville, VIPS (premium steak & salad bar) and A Twosome Place (premium dessert cafe) have opened stores in China and Vietnam as well as other countries in Asia.

===== Bio =====
In 2012, CJ completed construction of the $400 million nucleic acid factory in Shenyang, China, which was scheduled to begin producing animal feeds such as lysine and threonine and nucleotides in 2013. In 2013, CJ also built a lysine plant in Fort Dodge, Iowa in 2013.

===== Logistics & Retail =====
CJ Logistics, South Korea's largest logistics company, has been building a global business foundation to drive its growth as a global logistics company since 2013. Beginning with CJ Smart Cargo in China and further expanding its business areas in 2018 through the acquisitions of Gemadept in Vietnam and DSC Logistics in the United States, CJ Logistics has established a presence in 46 countries and 288 cities as of 2025.

CJ Olive Young, a leading Health & Beauty retailer, has expanded its presence in the global K-beauty market. In 2024, it was reported that out of all foreign visitors to Korea, seven out of ten visited Olive Young stores, highlighting its visibility among foreign visitors. Furthermore, in 2025, South Korea's cosmetics exports ranked second globally after the United States, with Olive Young playing a pivotal role in curating and distributing domestic beauty brands to global consumers.

===== Entertainment & Media =====
CJ ENM has played a significant role in the expansion of the Korean Wave (Hallyu), particularly through its K-pop content business.

In 2009, CJ ENM launched the Mnet Asian Music Awards (MAMA AWARDS) with the aim of promoting Asian pop music globally. In 2012, it introduced KCON in Los Angeles, a convention combining K-pop concerts with various Korean cultural experiences. KCON has since expanded to other locations such as Tokyo, Saudi Arabia, and Germany, and as of 2025, the event's cumulative offline attendance surpassed 2 million.

=== Controversies ===
Family feud

Although spun off from Samsung in 1993, CJ is still related to Samsung through family ties. Lee Kun-hee, who chaired Samsung until his death in 2020, was the younger brother of Lee Maeng-hee. The family came to the center of the media spotlight when Lee Maeng-hee and sister Lee Sook-hee filed civil suits against Lee Kun-hee, claiming that Lee Kun-hee had illegally acquired his inheritance by concealing parts of their father's, Lee Byeong-chul, assets. As a remedy, they asked for shares of Samsung Life Insurance, which controls Samsung Electronics.

Since then, the feud was highly publicized as the brothers were quoted in attacking each other through the media, and intensified after it was found out that a Samsung employee had tailed Lee Jay-hyun, the chairman of CJ group.

In January 2013, the court ruled against Lee Maeng-hee on the basis that there was not enough evidence to prove that the dividends and proceeds of Samsung was part of the inheritance.

Conviction of chairman

Company chairman Lee Jay-hyun was arrested in 2013 and convicted in 2014 of tax evasion and embezzlement. He was released from prison in August 2016 in an annual presidential pardon.

== Acquisitions ==
- 1962 Wonhyeong Industrial CO
- 1968 Mipung Industrial CO
- 1971 Dongyang Jedang
- 1975 Yongin hog farm
- 1985 Dongryp Industrial Corp
- 1997 Mnet, Cheil Investment & Securities
- 2000 39 Shopping
- 2004 CJ Consortium, Shin Dong Bang Corp., CJ Internet, Planers (now CJ Internet), Hanil Pharmaceuticals Ind., feed plant in Turkey
- 2006 Accord Express (Singaporean logistics company)
- 2007 Pioneer Trading, Inc., an American food manufacturing company
- 2009 Onmedia
- 2011 Korea Express
- 2017 CJ Darcl Logistics Limited
- 2018 Kahiki Foods, an American frozen food company based in Columbus, Ohio
- 2018 DSC Logistics
- 2019 Schwans Company
- 2022 Endeavor Content

== Affiliates ==
=== Food & Food Service ===
- CJ CheilJedang Food Business Division
- CJ Foodville
  - Cheiljemyunso (noodle restaurant)
  - The Steak House (New York style steak restaurant)
  - TOUS Les JOURS (bakery franchise)
  - VIPS (premium steak & salad bar)
- CJ Freshway

=== Bio ===
- CJ CheilJedang's Bio Division
- CJ Feed & Care
- CJ Bioscience

=== Logistics & Retail ===
- CJ Logistics
- CJ OliveYoung
- CJ ONS
- CJ ENM Commerce Division

=== Entertainment & Media ===
- CJ ENM Entertainment Division
- CJ CGV
- TVING
- Studio Dragon

==== Other language channels ====
- Shop CJ India - Hindi Indian home shopping channel
- O Shopping - Philippine home shopping channel
- CJ Grand Shopping - Mexican home shopping channel
- CJ Wow Shop - Malaysian home shopping channel (formerly)
- SCJ TV Shopping (formerly SCJ Life On) - SCTV5 - Vietnamese home shopping channel

=== Infrastructure ===
- CJ Logistics E&C Division
- CJ Olive Networks IT Business Division

=== Corporate Social Responsibility (CSR) ===
- CJ Cultural Foundation
- CJ Welfare Foundation

=== Former Affiliates ===
- CJ CheilJedang's Beverage Division - sold to Lotte Group in 2001
- CJ Investment & Securities - sold to Hyundai Heavy Industries Group in 2008, then sold again to DGB Financial Group in 2018, now known as iM Securities
- CJ Asset Management - sold to Hyundai Heavy Industries Group in 2008, then sold again to VI AMC in 2020, now known as VI Asset Management
- ChampVision also known as Champ TV - sold to Taekwang Group in 2011
- KM - sold to GTV (Berry Entertainment & Media) in 2015, now known as GMTV
- Badook TV - sold to Korea Baduk Association in 2015
- CJ Digital Music - merged with Genie Music in 2018
- A Twosome Place (premium dessert cafe) - sold in 2020 to Anchor Equity Partners, which sold it to The Carlyle Group after a year

== See also ==
- CJ Cup
