= List of libertarian political parties =

Officially registered members of Interlibertarians Associated members not yet officially registered as a member of Interlibertarians

This is a list of libertarian political parties.

== Active parties by country ==
Name	Founded	Country	Ideology	Membership
La Libertad Avanza	2021	Argentina	Libertarian conservatism Right-libertarianism; Right-wing populism Zionism	
Libertarian Party	2019	Argentina	Libertarian conservatism Minarchism	
Voice Libertarian Conservative Party	2021	Armenia	Libertarian conservatism	
Libertarian Party	2001	Australia	Classical liberalism	International Alliance of Libertarian Parties; Interlibertarians
Libertarian Party	2009	Brazil	Anarcho-capitalism	Interlibertarians
New Party	2011	Brazil	Classical liberalism Right-libertarianism	
League for Democracy Party	2006	Cambodia	Civil libertarianism Social liberalism	
British Columbia Libertarian Party	1986	Canada; British Columbia	Libertarian conservatism	
Libertarian Party of New Brunswick	2024	Canada; New Brunswick	Libertarian conservatism	
People's Party of Canada	2018	Canada	Classical liberalism Libertarian conservatism Right-wing populism	
Ontario Libertarian Party	1975	Canada; Ontario	Libertarian conservatism	Interlibertarians
Freedom Party of Ontario	1984	Canada; Ontario	Laissez-faire; Objectivism	
Conservative Party of Quebec	2009	Canada; Quebec	Fiscal conservatism Quebec federalism Quebec nationalism	
Buffalo Party of Saskatchewan	2020	Canada; Saskatchewan	Right-libertarianism; Right-wing populism Western Canadian separatism	
Libertarian Party of Chile	2018	Chile	Libertarianism; Minarchism	
National Libertarian Party	2025	Chile	Minarchism; Christian libertarianism National conservatism Right-wing antiglobalism	
Libertario	2014	Colombia	Minarchism	International Alliance of Libertarian Parties
Libertarian Movement	1994	Costa Rica	Libertarian conservatism	
Progressive Liberal Party	2016	Costa Rica	Libertarianism; Classical liberalism	
United We Can	2018	Costa Rica	Libertarianism; Classical liberalism	
Unión Liberal	2019	Costa Rica	Libertarian conservatism	
Liberal Democrats		Cyprus	Classical liberalism	Interlibertarians
Libertarian Party Voluntia	2025	Czech Republic	Right-libertarianism	International Alliance of Libertarian Parties
Svobodní	2009	Czech Republic	Libertarian conservatism National conservatism	Interlibertarians
Urza.cz	2021	Czech Republic	Anarcho-capitalism; Right-libertarianism	
Libertarian Party		Denmark	Classical liberalism	Interlibertarians
Liberal Alliance	2007	Denmark	Classical liberalism	
European Party for Individual Liberty	2013	European Union	Classical liberalism	Interlibertarians
Union of the Right for the Republic	2024	France	Right-libertarianism; Conservatism; Right-wing populism	
Parti libéral Mouvement des libertariens Parti libertarien	2013	France	Classical liberalism Minarchism	International Alliance of Libertarian Parties (founding member as Mouvement des libertariens, 2013–2016, and latest name since 2020)
Pirate Party	2006	France	Civil libertarianism E-democracy; Pirate politics	Pirate Parties International
Girchi – More Freedom	2021	Georgia	Right-libertarianism; Pro-Europeanism	International Alliance of Libertarian Parties; Alliance of Liberals and Democrats for Europe
Party of The Free	2016	Georgia	Right-libertarianism; Pro-Europeanism	International Alliance of Libertarian Parties
Party of Reason	2009	Germany	Classical liberalism	International Alliance of Libertarian Parties (founding member); Interlibertarians; European Party for Individual Liberty
DIE LIBERTÄREN	2022	Germany	Libertarianism; Voluntaryism; Individualism	
Liberal Alliance	2007	Greece	Classical liberalism	
Libertarian Party	2022	Hungary	Classical liberalism	
Libertarian Society of Iceland	2002	Iceland	Classical liberalism	
Liberal Democratic Party	2020	Iceland	Classical liberalism Euroscepticism	
Swarna Bharat Party		India	Classical liberalism	
Kurdistan Free Life Party	2004	Iran	Democratic confederalism	Kurdistan Communities Union
Iraq Freedom Congress	2015	Iraq	Libertarian socialism Democratic socialism Progressivism; Secularism	
Kurdistan Society's Freedom Movement	2014	Iraq; Kurdistan Region	Democratic confederalism Libertarian socialism	
Zehut	2015	Israel	Classical liberalism Minarchism; Zionism	
Love Party	1991	Italy	Free love Libertarianism	
Pannella List	1992	Italy	Liberalism; Libertarianism	
Italian Radicals	2001	Italy	Civil libertarianism Liberalism	Liberal International; Alliance of Liberals and Democrats for Europe
Libertarian Movement	2005	Italy	Anarcho-capitalism	International Alliance of Libertarian Parties; Interlibertarians
Go Tax Evaders!		Italy	Anarcho-capitalism	Interlibertarians
North-East Project	2004	Italy; Veneto	Federalism; Venetian nationalism	
Liberty and Democracy for the Republic	2011	Ivory Coast	Classical liberalism	International Alliance of Libertarian Parties
Democratic Choice of Kazakhstan	2017	Kazakhstan	Civil libertarianism	
Déi Liberal	2015	Luxembourg	Classical liberalism	
Libertarian Party	1993	Netherlands	Classical liberalism	International Alliance of Libertarian Parties; Interlibertarians; European Party for Individual Liberty
ACT New Zealand	1994	New Zealand	Classical liberalism	
Liberalistene	2014	Norway	Classical liberalism	International Alliance of Libertarian Parties
Progress Party	1973	Norway	Conservative liberalism Right-libertarianism; Right-wing populism	
Congress of the New Right	2011	Poland	Right-libertarianism; Right-wing populism	
New Hope	2015	Poland	Libertarian conservatism Paleolibertarianism; Right-wing populism Hard Euroscepticism	Confederation Liberty and Independence (founding member); International Alliance of Libertarian Parties (founding member)
Libertarianie	2020	Poland	Minarchism; Right-libertarianism; Classical liberalism	
Liberal Initiative	2017	Portugal	Classical liberalism Right-libertarianism; Pro-Europeanism	Alliance of Liberals and Democrats for Europe Party
Libertarian Party of Russia	2008	Russia	Anarcho-capitalism; Minarchism	International Alliance of Libertarian Parties (founding member); Interlibertarians
Freedom and Solidarity	2009	Slovakia	Civil libertarianism Classical liberalism	European Conservatives and Reformists Party
Free Democrats	2019	South Africa	Libertarianism	
Libertarian Party of South Africa	2013	South Africa	Classical liberalism	International Alliance of Libertarian Parties (founding member); Interlibertarians
Capitalist Party of South Africa	2019	South Africa	Classical liberalism	
Libertarian Party		South Korea	Anarcho-capitalism	
Partido Libertario	2009	Spain	Anarcho-capitalism	International Alliance of Libertarian Parties; Interlibertarians; European Party for Individual Liberty
Unitarian Candidacy of Workers	1979	Spain; Andalusia	Libertarian socialism	
Classical Liberal Party	2004	Sweden	Classical liberalism	International Alliance of Libertarian Parties
Libertarian Party of Geneva		Switzerland; Geneva	Classical liberalism	
Libertarian Party	2014	Switzerland	Classical liberalism	International Alliance of Libertarian Parties
I Liberisti Ticinesi		Switzerland; Ticino	Classical liberalism	Interlibertarians
Democratic Union Party	2003	Syria; DAANES	Democratic confederalism	Kurdistan Communities Union
Syrian National Democratic Alliance	2014	Syria; DAANES	Democratic confederalism	
Liberal Democratic Party	1994	Turkey	Classical liberalism	Interlibertarians
Pirate Party Turkey	2021	Turkey	Pirate politics	
5.10	2014	Ukraine	Classical liberalism	Interlibertarians
Libertarian Party	2007	United Kingdom	Classical liberalism Euroscepticism	International Alliance of Libertarian Parties (founding member); Interlibertarians
Pirate Party UK	2009	United Kingdom	Civil libertarianism Pirate politics	
Scottish Libertarian Party	2012	United Kingdom; Scotland	Classical liberalism Euroscepticism; Scottish independence	International Alliance of Libertarian Parties
Independent Party of Delaware	2000	United States; Delaware	Fiscal conservatism Laissez-faire	
Libertarian Party	1971	United States	Libertarianism; Classical liberalism Cultural liberalism Non-interventionism; Libertarian socialism (faction)	International Alliance of Libertarian Parties (founding member); Interlibertarians
Green Party of the United States	2001	United States	Green politics Eco-socialism; Libertarian socialism	Global Greens
Natural Law Party	1992	United States	Civil libertarianism Environmentalism	
Transhumanist Party	2014	United States	Libertarian transhumanism	Transhumanist Party Global
U.S. Marijuana Party	2002	United States	Cannabis legalization Civil libertarianism	
United States Pirate Party	2006	United States	Civil libertarianism Direct democracy Pirate politics	Pirate Parties International
Libertarian Liberal Party		Uruguay	Classical liberalism	Interlibertarians
Liberty Advances	2025	Uruguay	Libertarianism	

== Defunct parties by country ==
Name	Active	Country	Ideology	Membership
Liberal Libertarian Party	2009–2014	Argentina	Classical liberalism	Interlibertarians
WikiLeaks Party	2013–2015	Australia	Anti-authoritarianism	
Anderz	2014	Belgium	Libertarian socialism	
Libertarian Party	2012-2023	Belgium	Classical liberalism Minarchism	International Alliance of Libertarian Parties (founding member); Interlibertarians
Libertair, Direct, Democratisch	2007–?	Belgium; Flanders	Conservative liberalism Euroscepticism; Right-wing populism	European Conservatives and Reformists Party; European Conservatives and Reformists
Freedom Party of Manitoba	1980s–2000s	Canada; Manitoba	Objectivism	Freedom Party International
Manitoba First	2016-2022	Canada; Manitoba	Right-libertarianism	
Atlantica Party	2016-2024	Canada; Nova Scotia	Libertarian conservatism	Freedom Party International
Pauper Party of Ontario	2011-2020s	Canada; Ontario	Populism; Social credit	
Libertarian Party of Canada	1973–2026	Canada	Classical liberalism	Interlibertarians
Social Convergence	2018–2024	Chile	Autonomist Marxism; Libertarian socialism	
Liberal Alternative	2006–2011	France	Classical liberalism	
Liberal Democratic Party	2008–2019	France	Classical liberalism	European Party for Individual Liberty
Le az adók 75%-ával Párt (Down with 75% of Taxes Party)	2019–2022	Hungary	Classical liberalism	
Right-Green People's Party	2010–2016	Iceland	Euroscepticism; Green conservatism Right-libertarianism	
Swatantra Party	1959–1974	India	Classical liberalism	
Kurdistan Democratic Solution Party	2002–2015	Iraq; Kurdistan Region	Democratic confederalism	Kurdistan Communities Union
Liberal Reformers	2005–2009	Italy	Classical liberalism	
Pannella List	1989–1996	Italy	Civil libertarianism Radicalism	
Libertarianz	1995–2014	New Zealand	Objectivism	
Liberal People's Party	1992–2017	Norway	Classical liberalism Laissez-faire; Objectivism	
Libertarian Party	2015–2020	Poland	Anarcho-capitalism; Minarchism	
Real Politics Union	1990–2011	Poland	Classical liberalism Euroscepticism	
Russian Libertarian Movement	2003–2006	Russia	Classical liberalism	
Dawn of Liberty Party	2018-2024	South Korea	National conservatism Right-libertarianism; Right-wing populism	
Syndicalist Party	1932–1985	Spain	Libertarian socialism Libertarian possibilism Treintismo; Anarcho-syndicalism	
Libertarian Municipal People	1954–2011	Sweden	Left-libertarianism; Syndicalism	
Kurdistan Workers' Party	1978–2025	Turkey	Democratic confederalism Libertarian socialism	Kurdistan Communities Union
Alaskan Independence Party	1984–2025	United States; Alaska	Alaskan nationalism Libertarian conservatism	
Boston Tea Party	2006–2012	United States	Classical liberalism	Interlibertarians
Personal Choice Party	2004–2006	United States	Classical liberalism	

== Organizations associated with Libertarian parties ==
Name	Founded	Association	Country	Ideology
Libertarian Platform	2008	Free Democratic Party	Germany	Anarcho-capitalism; Classical liberalism
Libertarian Movement	2022	Libertarian Party	Hungary	Anarcho-capitalism; Minarchism; Classical liberalism
College Libertarians		Libertarian Party	United States	Libertarianism
Libertarians for Life	1976	Libertarian Party	United States	Pro-life libertarianism
LPRadicals	1975?/2006	Libertarian Party	United States	Anarcho-capitalism
Outright Libertarians	1998	Libertarian Party	United States	LGBTQ libertarianism
Republican Liberty Caucus	1991	Libertarian Party	United States	Libertarian conservatism

== See also ==
- Liberal parties by country
- List of libertarian organizations
- Lists of political parties
- Outline of libertarianism
