= IFC =

IFC may refer to:

== Computers and electronics ==
- Industry Foundation Classes, an object-based file format (IFC), intended to describe architectural, building and construction industry data, frequently used in building information modeling (BIM) based projects
- Initial Filter Criteria, similar to triggers in mobile networks
- Integer factorization, cryptography
- Integrated fluidic circuit, a type of integrated circuit (IC) using fluids
- Intel Fortran Compiler, a group of Fortran compilers from Intel for Windows, Linux, and OS X
- Intelligent flight control system (IFC or IFCS)
- Internet Foundation Classes, a now defunct graphics library for Java
- Intelligent Frame Creation, a motion interpolation feature of Panasonic televisions

== Entertainment ==
- IFC (Canadian TV channel), a defunct Canadian cable TV channel
- IFC (American TV channel), an American cable TV channel formerly known as the Independent Film Channel
- Independent Film Company, an American film distributor
- Irish Film Centre, former name of the Irish Film Institute

== Organizations ==
- InterFaith Conference of Metropolitan Washington, an interfaith non-profit organization based in Washington, D.C.
- International Federation of Cheerleading, formed in 1998 and is a non-profit federation based in Tokyo, Japan
- International Filing Company, a manufacturer of filing supplies for the printing industry and several other businesses
- International Finance Corporation, a member of the World Bank Group
- International Financial Commission, created to supervise Greece's public finances in the late 19th/early 20th century
- Iraq Freedom Congress, an Iraqi organization
- North American Interfraternity Conference (IFC or NIC), an association of collegiate men's fraternities
- Irrawaddy Flotilla Company was a passenger and cargo ferry company

== Sports ==
- Ido's Football Club, a soccer club from Hendrik-Ido-Ambacht, Netherlands
- Ilioupoli F.C., a sports club in Greece
- Ilkeston F.C., an English football club based at the New Manor Ground in Ilkeston, Derbyshire
- Immaculata F.C., Northern Irish football club
- Institute F.C., Northern Ireland football club
- International Football Cup, the original name for the UEFA Intertoto Cup
- Islandmagee F.C., Northern Irish football club

== Other uses ==
- International Fixed Calendar, a calendar proposal
- International Freedom Center, a proposed museum for the World Trade Center site in New York City

== See also ==
- IFC Mall (disambiguation)
