= International Alliance of Libertarian Parties =

Alliance of libertarian political parties

- Abbreviation: IALP
- Formation: 6 March 2015; 11 years ago
- Founded at: Bournemouth, UK
- Type: International political organization
- Legal status: Nonprofit advocacy organization
- Purpose: Global coordination of libertarian political parties
- Members: 14 (2026)
- Chair: Jaroslav Romanchuk
- Board of directors: Executive Committee
- Main organ: General Assembly
- Website: ialp.net

The International Alliance of Libertarian Parties (IALP) is a global political association of libertarian parties founded in 2015 in Bournemouth, United Kingdom. It aims to facilitate cooperation among libertarian political organizations, promote the exchange of information and strategies, and represent libertarian viewpoints in international discussions.

The alliance brings together parties advocating individual liberty, free markets, limited government, and political decentralization, and functions as a counterpart to other transnational party networks such as the Liberal International, Socialist International, and International Democracy Union.

== Aims ==
The International Alliance of Libertarian Parties (IALP) is an international organization that coordinates cooperation among political parties adhering to libertarian ideology. According to the organization, the alliance's objectives are to promote libertarian principles, support the development of member parties, encourage the exchange of information and experience, and represent libertarian viewpoints in international discussions.

The IALP's work is based on ideas such as individual liberty, voluntary association, market economics, opposition to aggression, and political decentralization. Member parties retain their political independence and participate on a voluntary basis. It was created as a libertarian alternative to other global political alliances, such as the International Democracy Union, Socialist International, and Liberal International.

The organization carries out its activities through general assemblies, regional coordination structures, policy statements, and thematic working groups.

== History ==
The origins of the International Alliance of Libertarian Parties trace back to discussions within the global libertarian movement in the early 2000s about forming a coordinated political network once several countries had elected libertarian representatives, an idea originally promoted by U.S. libertarian theorist David Nolan.

At the 2014 Libertarian National Convention in the United States, the Libertarian National Committee adopted a resolution calling for the creation of an international association of libertarian parties. Former LNC chair Geoff Neale was appointed to lead the initiative and began coordinating with libertarian leaders from the United States, the United Kingdom, Spain, and the Netherlands to establish a global alliance of parties sharing similar principles. The IALP was formally founded on 6 March 2015 at a congress in Bournemouth, United Kingdom, attended by representatives of libertarian parties from Europe, North America, and other regions. In total, delegates from around a dozen countries took part in adopting the alliance's founding statutes, while Geoff Neale was elected its first chair.

Following several years of limited visibility, the alliance resumed regular public activity in the mid-2020s. In September 2024, it adopted a resolution opposing state censorship of social networks. In 2024, IALP Chairman Iván Dubois, also a member of the Mercosur Parliament (Parlasur), visited Ukraine amidst Russia's invasion to meet Ukrainian officials, including at a meeting of Latin American parliamentarians with President Volodymyr Zelenskyy.

Under Dubois's Chairmanship, reflecting the growing influence of Argentina’s La Libertad Avanza movement following Javier Milei’s election as President of Argentina, the IALP increased its Latin American engagement. The organization issued statements recognizing Venezuelan opposition leader Edmundo González Urrutia as legitimate President of Venezuela and condemning the use of drug laws against political opponents in Georgia. Upon the U.S. military intervention to oust Nicolas Maduro from Venezuela, IALP rejected the legitimacy of Delcy Rodriguez.

In 2025, the IALP formally reconstituted and re-registered in the United States as a 501(c)(4) nonprofit advocacy organization, adopting a new constitution and leadership framework while maintaining its international structure and membership. On 26 January 2026, the Russian Ministry of Justice classified the IALP as an undesirable organization, a designation meant to ban its activities in Russia and hold criminally liable all its partners within the Russian Federation. The Libertarian Party of Russia issued a statement in response denying all ties to the Alliance.

On 25 February, IALP held its First Congress, during which it expanded to 14 member political parties and elected Belarusian dissident Jaroslav Romanchuk as Chairman.

== Members ==
Country	Party	Abbreviation	Government	Lower Chamber	Upper Chamber
Angola	Partido Liberal	PL	Extraparliamentary opposition	0 / 220	
Czech Republic	Libertarian Party Voluntia	Voluntia	Extraparliamentary opposition	0 / 200	0 / 81
France	Parti libertarien	PL	Extraparliamentary opposition	0 / 577	0 / 348
Georgia	Girchi – More Freedom	GMF	Extraparliamentary opposition	0 / 150	
Germany	Party of Reason	PdV	Extraparliamentary opposition	0 / 630	0 / 69
Hungary	Cut Taxes by 75%	LA75	Extraparliamentary opposition	0 / 199	
Jamaica	United Independents' Congress	UIC	Extraparliamentary opposition	0 / 63	0 / 21
Kenya	National Liberal Party	NLP	Extraparliamentary opposition	0 / 349	0 / 67
Netherlands	Libertarian Party	LP	Extraparliamentary opposition	0 / 150	0 / 75
Spain	Libertarian Party	P-LIB	Extraparliamentary opposition	0 / 350	0 / 264
Suriname	Democratic Alternative '91	DA91	Extraparliamentary opposition	0 / 51	
Switzerland	Libertarian Party	LP	Extraparliamentary opposition	0 / 46	0 / 200
United Kingdom	Libertarian Party UK	LPUK	Extraparliamentary opposition	0 / 650	0 / 783
United States	Libertarian Party	LP	Extraparliamentary opposition	0 / 435	0 / 100

=== Associated members ===
Associated members are emerging or libertarian or classical liberal political parties who are in the process of meeting the requirements to be Members of the IALP.

- Nepal: Nepal Liberal Party (since February 2026)
- Armenia: Dzain - Libertarian-Conservative Party (since February 2026)

=== Observers ===
Observers are civil society organizations or political movements formally recognized as partners of IALP.

- Ladies of Liberty Alliance (since February 2026)
- Zimbabwe Network for Social Justice (Zimbabwe; since February 2026)
- Afghanistan Economic and Legal Studies Organization (Afghanistan; since February 2026)
- Coalition for Market and Liberal Solutions (Zimbabwe; since March 2026)
- Vilna Natsiya (Ukraine; since April 2026)

=== Former members ===
- Australia – Libertarian Party
- Belgium – Libertarian Party (2015–2023)
- Belgium – VolksLiga
- Canada – Libertarian Party of Canada
- Colombia – Libertarian Movement
- Czech Republic – Party of Free Citizens (2015–2025)
- Georgia – Party of The Free (2024–2025)
- Hungary – Libertarian Party
- Italy – Libertarian Movement
- Ivory Coast – Freedom and Democracy for the Republic
- Norway – Capitalist Party (2015–2025)
- Poland – New Hope (2018–2025)
- Portugal – Libertarian Party
- Russia – Libertarian Party of Russia
- United Kingdom – Scottish Libertarian Party
- South Africa – Libertarian Party of South Africa
- Sweden – Classical Liberal Party (2015–2025)
- Mexico – Libertarian Mexico

== Leadership ==
=== Chairs ===
N°	Portrait	Name	Country	Years		Membership
1		Geoff Neale	United States	2015	2022	U.S. Libertarian Party
2		Roald Schoenmakers	Netherlands	2022	2023	Libertarian Party of the Netherlands
3		Iván Dubois	Argentina	2022	24 February 2026	La Libertad Avanza
4		Jaroslav Romanchuk	Ukraine	25 February 2026	-	Civil society

=== Organization ===
The IALP is governed by a General Assembly, composed of delegates from all full member parties, which serves as the alliance's highest decision-making body. The General Assembly elects the executive committee, which implements its decisions and manages the organization's day-to-day affairs.

The executive committee includes a chairperson, Secretary-General, Treasurer, Regional Vice-Chairs, and up to five members elected at large. The chairperson represents the organisation internationally and presides over its meetings, while the Secretary-General oversees administration and the Treasurer manages financial reporting.

Membership is open to libertarian political parties that uphold the principles of the IALP Declaration and operate democratically. Parties may join as Full Members (with voting rights), Associate Members (non-voting but participatory), or Observers (individuals or organisations supportive of libertarian principles).

=== Executive Committee ===
The current Executive Committee, elected on 25 February 2026, includes:

Executive Committee of IALP
Name	Party	Position
Jaroslav Romanchuk	Civil society	Chairman
Lana Leguia	U.S. Libertarian Party	Secretary General
Marialexandra Garcia	U.S. Libertarian Party	Treasurer
Joseph Patterson	United Independents' Congress	At-Large Director
Tinatin Bolokadze	Girchi - More Freedom	At-Large Director
Amanda Griffiths	U.S. Libertarian Party	Regional Vice-chair for North America
Angelic del Castilho	Democratic Alternative '91	Regional Vice-chair for South & Central America
Jose Maria Gonzàlez	Partido Libertario	Regional Vice-chair for Western & Central Europe
Pierre-Alexandre Crevaux	Girchi - More Freedom	Regional Vice-chair for Eastern Europe and Central Asia
Augustus Kyalo Muli	National Liberal Party	Regional Vice-chair for Africa
