= List of libertarian organizations =

This is a list of notable libertarian organizations.

== Caucuses ==
- LPRadicals
- Republican Liberty Caucus
- Mises Caucus

== Think tanks and non-profit institutions ==
- Americans for Limited Government
- Atlas Network
- Cascade Policy Institute
- Cato Institute – Washington, DC
- Centre for Civil Society
- Center for Individual Freedom
- Center for Libertarian Studies (CLS; defunct)
- Centre for Independent Studies (CIS)
- Competitive Enterprise Institute
- Families Against Mandatory Minimums (FAMM)
- Foundation for Economic Education (FEE)
- Foundation for Rational Economics and Education (FREE)
- Fraser Institute
- The Independent Institute
- Institute for Humane Studies (IHS)
- Institute for Justice (IJ)
- Institute of Public Affairs (IPA)
- Jerusalem Institute for Market Studies
- James G. Martin Center for Academic Renewal
- Ladies of Liberty Alliance
- Libertas Institute (LI) – Utah, US
- Ludwig von Mises Institute – Alabama, US
- Mackinac Center for Public Policy – Michigan, US
- Niskanen Center
- Pacific Research Institute (PRI)
- Reason Foundation – Publisher of Reason

== Issue and activist ==
- Young ACT
- Alliance of Libertarian Activists (ALA; defunct)
- Bureaucrash
- Campaign for Liberty
- Center for a Stateless Society (C4SS)
- Cop Block
- Downsize DC Foundation
- The Future of Freedom Conference (FOF; defunct)
- Free State Project
- FreedomWorks (defunct)
- Freedom School
- Libertarian Alliance
- Libertarian League
- Libertarian Party (United States)
- Libertair, Direct, Democratisch (defunct)
- Rampart College (defunct)
- Society for Libertarian Life (SLL; defunct)
- Students for a Libertarian Society (SLS; defunct)
- Students for Liberty (SFL)
- World Libertarian Order (WLO)
- Young Americans for Liberty (YAL)

== Publishers and publications ==
- Laissez Faire Books
- Liberty (magazine)
- Reason (magazine)
- Online Library of Liberty

== Other ==
- The Atlas Society
- Free State Project
- Libertarians for Life
- Liberty Fund
- Prometheus Award – presented by the Libertarian Futurist Society

== See also ==
- List of libertarian political parties
- Outline of libertarianism
