= Responsible Future (Iceland) =

Responsible Future Ábyrg framtíð
- Abbreviation: ÁF
- Leader: Jóhannes Loftsson
- Founded: 27 July 2021
- Headquarters: Reykjavík
- Ideology: Right-libertarianism; Anti-vaccination
- Political position: Right-wing
- Colours: Purple
- Althing: 0 / 63

Election symbol
- Y

Website
- www.johannesloftsson.com

Responsible Future (Icelandic: Ábyrg framtíð, ÁF) is an Icelandic political party. It was established on 27 July 2021. Responsible Future is a party that promotes COVID-19 misinformation and misinformation around vaccines. The party's formation was preceded by Jóhannes Loftsson's writings in 2020, in which he voiced very strong opposition to harsh disease control measures. The party ran in the 2021 parliamentary election advocating for legal proceedings against politicians involved in Iceland's disease prevention policies and greater public input into the allocation of radio fees in the name of freedom of expression.

== History ==
The party first ran in the 2021 Icelandic parliamentary election and candidacy was announced on 10 September 2021. The party originally intended to run in two constituencies, Reykjavík North and the South constituency, but due to few signatures, they could only run in Reykjavík North, which meant that the party's chairman, Jóhannes Loftsson, could not vote for the party in the election. Responsible Future received 144 votes (0.1% support) and no elected MPs.

The party contested the 2024 Icelandic parliamentary election. Responsible Future received 42 votes (0.02% support) and no elected MPs.

== Election results ==
Election	Leader	Votes	%	Seats	+/–	Position	Government
2021	Jóhannes Loftsson	144	0.07	0 / 63	New	11th	Extra-parliamentary
2024	Jóhannes Loftsson	42	0.02	0 / 63	0	11th	Extra-parliamentary
