= Jóhannes Loftsson =

Icelandic politician (born 1973)

Leader of the Responsible Future Party
- Incumbent
- Assumed office 27 July 2021
- Preceded by: Party established

Personal details
- Born: 30 June 1973 (age 53)
- Citizenship: Icelandic
- Party: Responsible Future

Jóhannes Loftsson (born 30 June 1973) is an Icelandic engineer, activist and chairman of the Libertarian Society of Iceland and chairman of the political party Responsible Future.

== Career ==
He became known in 2020 when he protested measures during the COVID-19 pandemic. He founded the party Responsible Future in the summer of 2021. His party ran in one constituency in the 2021 Icelandic parliamentary election with Loftsson as the leader. Loftsson sought first place on the list of the Centre Party in Reykjavík for the 2022 Icelandic municipal elections. Loftsson led the Responsible Future list of candidates in the 2022 municipal elections and the 2024 Icelandic parliamentary election.
