= Jonathan Henke =

American political blogger (born 1974)

Jonathan Henke (born 1974) was an American political blogger. Currently, he is an internet strategy and communications consultant.

Henke, a proponent of the modern American political philosophy of neolibertarianism, began blogging at Questions and Observations (QandO) with co-contributors Dale Franks and Bruce McQuain in 2003. As part of their website, the three also produced a weekly podcast, which Franks and McQuain continue today along with other QandO contributors.

During the 2006 Senate Election campaign, after 11 years of experience in talk radio, Henke served as Netroots Coordinator for George Allen.

Shortly afterward, Henke served as the New Media Director for the Republican Communications Office, an office of the Senate Republican caucus under the leadership of United States Senate Minority Leader Mitch McConnell (R-KY). Congressional Quarterly wrote that Henke "launched one of the first and most successful blogger outreach operations on the Capitol Hill, one that has served as a template for other offices." During his time as New Media Director, Henke contributed entries at QandO less frequently than before, and in January 2007, two other bloggers, Bryan Pick and Billy Hollis, joined QandO.

Henke announced in June 2007 that he would serve Fred Thompson's presidential campaign as an Online Brand Manager. Though Thompson withdrew his candidacy in January 2008, Henke continued to work as a consultant, and started his own firm later that year.

In May 2008, Henke left QandO to co-create and blog at The Next Right with Patrick Ruffini and Soren Dayton.

Henke cofounded another political communications firm, CRAFT Media Digital, in early 2010. Between December 2011 and March 2012, he left CRAFT.

By 2013, Henke was Strategic Director at TechFreedom, a think tank. During his time in that role, he wrote a poem on NSA surveillance that appeared in The Atlantic.
