= 2014 Libertarian National Convention =

United States political event

- 2014 United States elections

Convention
- Dates: 26–29 June 2014
- City: Columbus, Ohio
- Venue: Hyatt Regency
- Notable speakers: Judge James Gray, 2012 LP Vice-Presidential Candidate Michael Grossberg, Founder, Libertarian Futurist Society; Gary E Johnson, 2012 LP Presidential Candidate; Rob Kampia, Executive Director of the Marijuana Policy Project; Alexander McCobin, Executive Director of Students for Liberty; Guy Montrose, Chair, United Kingdom Libertarian Party (LPUK); Lawrence Reed, President, Foundation for Economic Education; Mark Skousen, Founder and Producer, FreedomFest; Ben Swann, Investigative Reporter, Truth in Media; Jeffrey Tucker, CLO, Liberty.me; Publisher and Executive Editor, Laissez Faire Books Andrew Withers, Cofounder and Past Chair, United Kingdom Libertarian Party (LPUK)

The 2014 Libertarian National Convention was a biennial convention of the Libertarian Party that was held in Columbus, Ohio from Thursday June 26 to Sunday June 29, 2014.

Nicholas Sarwark of Denver was elected Chair of the Libertarian National Committee.
