= Libertarian Party (Switzerland) =

Libertarian Party Libertäre Partei (German) Parti Libertarien (French) Partito Libertario (Italian)
- President: Martin Hartmann
- Founded: 18 June 2014; 11 years ago
- Ideology: Right-libertarianism; Minarchism; Hard Euroscepticism
- Political position: Right-wing
- International affiliation: International Alliance of Libertarian Parties
- Colors: Yellow

Website
- libertaere-partei.ch

The Libertarian Party is a libertarian political party in Switzerland formed on 18 June 2014. It was founded as The Swiss Independence Party up!, also known as up! Switzerland. It is the main founder of the International Alliance of Libertarian Parties. It took on its current name in March 2021.

== History ==
The Libertarian Party was founded in 2014 by Simon Scherrer, Silvan Amberg and Brenda Mäder. The announcement received quite a broad media attention due to its founder Brenda being the former president of the Young Liberals. In 2015, the party founded its cantonal section in Zurich and was running for national parliament without success.

In February 2018, the party again received broad attention due to the appearance of Simon Scherrer and Silvan Amberg in the national TV-debate Arena for their opposition against the federal taxes.

== Political positions ==
The party's vision is to reduce government activities to a minimum. The sole purpose of government should be to protect life, property and liberty of its citizens.

The party puts strong emphasis on its philosophical roots, including self-ownership and the non-aggression-principle and has formulated those foundations in "paper of principles".

Since its incorporation, the party has been advocate of abolishing subsidies (e.g. for culture), the federal income tax, the beer tax, and the compulsory old age insurance "AHV", liberalizing migration and legalizing all drugs.

== Organisation ==
The Libertarian Party is governed by a national board which is elected annually by its active members with voting rights (so-called "driver"). The board can establish local bodies. The only cantonal party has been founded in the Canton of Zurich so far. Up! has been active only in the German-speaking part of Switzerland but it has recently launched a website in French.

The party has confirmed several times that it will run for parliament only, but it will refrain from any executive positions in politics.

== Public perception and criticism ==
The party has been named a "hippie version" of the Swiss liberal party FDP due to its tolerant position on drugs. Swiss media has referred to up! as being "radical avant-garde", but also as "Government-haters" or "enemy of the state".

Often the party is referred to as "young", "small" or even "micro-party". Some media has criticized that up! is gaining more media attention than it would deserve based on its size and electorate.

== See also ==
- List of libertarian political parties
