= Urza.cz =

Don't Vote Urza.cz Nevolte Urza.cz
- Leader: Martin Urza
- Chairman: None
- Founded: 20 July 2021
- Registered: 11677309
- Headquarters: V Bažantnici 2654, Kladno, 272 01
- Ideology: Anarcho-capitalism; Right-libertarianism
- Colours: Black; Yellow
- Chamber of Deputies: 0 / 200
- Senate: 0 / 81
- European Parliament: 0 / 21

Website
- urza.cz

Nevolte Urza.cz (English: Don't Vote Urza.cz) is a Czech political party, founded by the anarcho-capitalist Martin Urza before the 2021 Czech legislative election. He stated that he was running, but did not want to be elected. The full, official name of the party is Urza.cz: Nechceme vaše hlasy; ke svobodě se nelze provolit. Odmítneme každou politickou funkci; nechceme totiž lidem nařizovat, jak mají žít. Máme jinou vizi. Jdeme jinou cestou – najdete ji na webu www.urza.cz. (meaning "Urza.cz: We don't want your votes; freedom cannot be invoked. We will reject any political function; we do not want to tell people how to live. We have a different vision. We are going in a different direction – you can find it on the website www.urza.cz.")

== Program ==
The party rejects all political functions, which it justifies by saying that no one should rule anyone by force. Even if elected, the party says it would refuse to accept any position, and would resign any mandate obtained in the event of election (if all the party's alternates gradually reject the mandate, this mandate will remain vacant until the end of the election period).

The main goal of Urza.cz is to provoke a society-wide debate on what it argues is the harmful role of the state in certain areas, and the implementation of a free market in these areas. The party further claims that the state interferes too much in the freedom of citizens, and should therefore limit itself. The ideas of the movement are based on anarcho-capitalism. Urza describes his political convictions in his work.

== History ==
Urza established the party in April 2021, when he began collecting signatures among his supporters. By July, 1,618 signatures had been collected (1,000 are needed to establish a political party), but the Ministry of the Interior rejected the first attempt to register the party. The movement therefore amended its statutes and the second attempt to register was successful.

Tereza Urzová (née Sladkovská), the lead candidate in the Plzeň Region, was previously a member of Svobodní, and ran for the European Parliament in 2014.

== 2021 elections ==
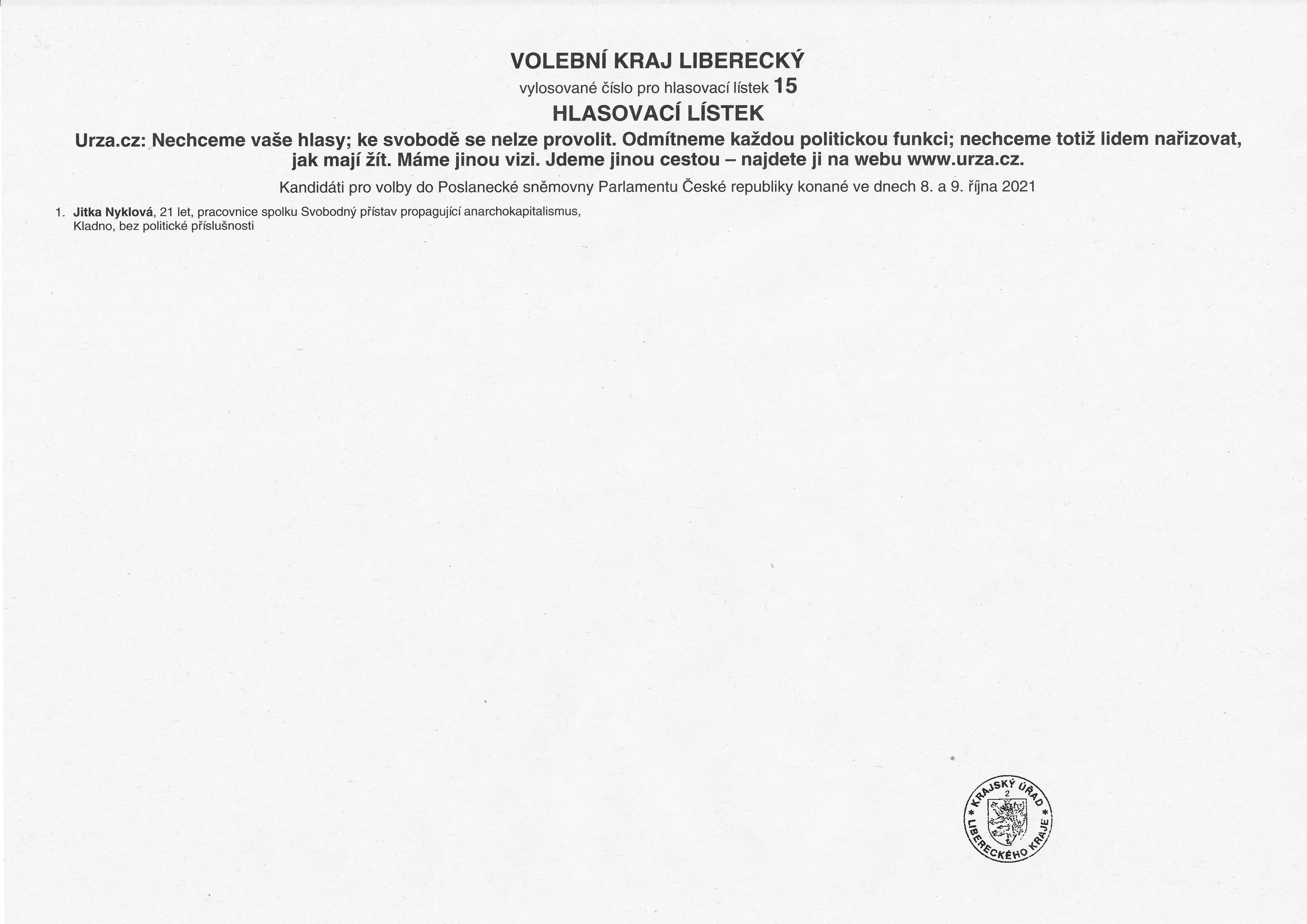
Ballot paper for the 2021 Czech legislative election in the Liberec Region

The following persons are candidates in individual regions (the party is also specific in that, apart from the Plzeň Region, only one person is running for it in each region):

Region	Candidate		Two candidates	
Region	Name	Party	Name	Party
Prague	Martin Urza	Urza.cz		
Central Bohemian	Jana Urzová			
South Bohemian	Klára Kárníková			
Plzeň	Tereza Urzová	Urza.cz	Miroslav Suchý	
Karlovy Vary	Veronika Löbelová			
Ústí nad Labem	Anna Honzíková			
Liberec	Jitka Nyklová			
Hradec Králové	Jiří Lžičař			
Pardubice	Jana Isabella Růžičková			
Vysočina	Radka Mužíková			
South Moravian	Rosalie Stříbrná			
Olomouc	Lucie Komárková			
Zlín	Igor Bogdanov			
Moravian-Silesian	Kateřina Přibylová			

== Election results ==
=== Chamber of Deputies ===
Date	Leader	Votes		Seats			Position
Date	Leader	No.	%	No.	±	Size	Position
2021	Martin Urza	6,775	0.12	0 / 200	0	17th	No seats
2025	Martin Urza	282	0.01	0 / 200	0	26th	No seats

=== European Parliament ===
Election	List leader	Votes	%	Seats	+/−	EP Group
2024	Martin Urza	2,426	0.08 (#26)	0 / 21	New	−
