= IFC Mall =

IFC Mall may refer to:

- IFC Mall (Hong Kong)
- IFC Mall (Seoul)
- IFC Mall (Shanghai)
