= Mikhail Svetov =

Russian politician, political commentator and blogger (born 1985)

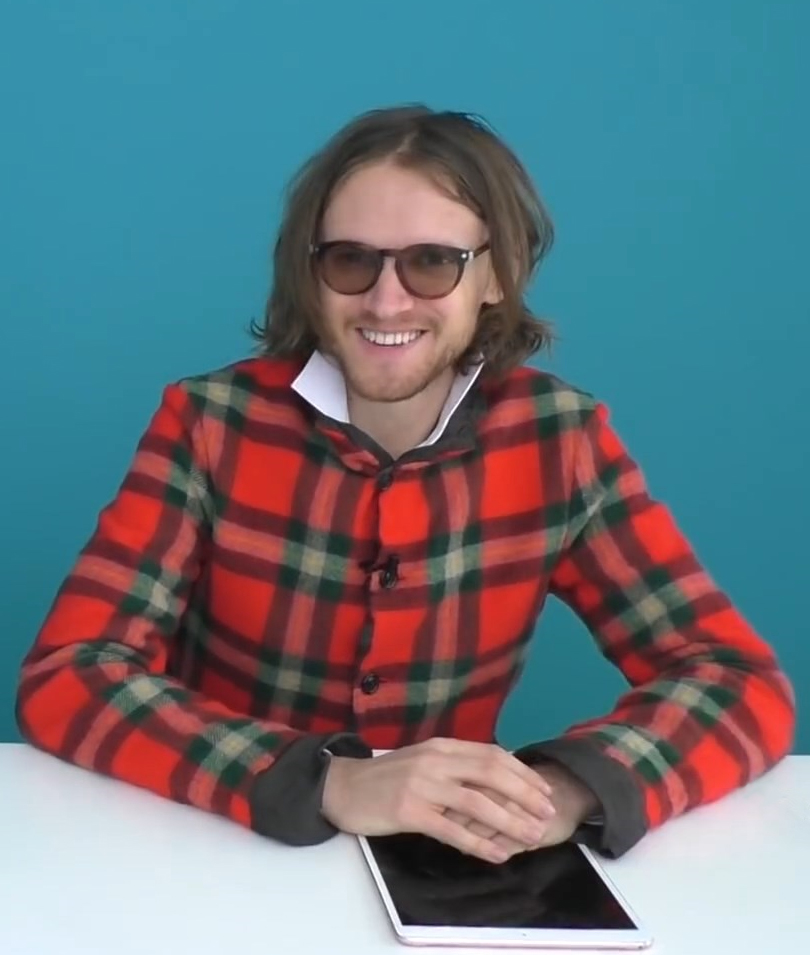

Member of the Ethics Committee of the Libertarian Party of Russia
- Incumbent
- Assumed office November 8, 2020

Member of the Federal Committee of the Libertarian Party of Russia
- In office March 4, 2017 – November 4, 2019

Personal details
- Born: Mikhail Vladimirovich Svetov; January 4, 1985 (age 41) Moscow, Russian SFSR, Soviet Union
- Party: Libertarian Party of Russia
- Education: Russian State University for the Humanities; University of Nottingham
- Occupation: Politician, activist, blogger, ideologist and popularizer of libertarianism in Russia
- Profession: Political scientist, screenwriter

Mikhail Vladimirovich Svetov (Russian: Михаи́л Влади́мирович Све́тов; born January 4, 1985) is a Russian politician, public figure, political commentator, and blogger. He serves as the chairman of the civil society movement "Civil Society". Svetov is one of the main ideologists and popularizers of libertarianism in Russia. He has organized major rallies on various political and public topics. Svetov runs a YouTube channel and an online newspaper, both entitled "SVTV".

== Biography ==
Svetov was born in Moscow to medical students. Svetov describes his family as being classical liberals when he was growing up. According to him, his distant relative was the Belarusian artist Vitold Byalynitsky-Birulya. From the third grade on, he was homeschooled by his family, with the exception of one year spent at Appleby College in Canada at the age of 15. According to Mikhail, in 2004, when he was 19 years old, he almost joined the National Bolshevik Party.

From 2004 to 2006, Svetov studied at the Russian State University for the Humanities. From there, he transferred to the University of Nottingham and graduated in 2009 with a degree in Political Science. According to his own statement, Svetov is fluent in English, French and Japanese.

In the UK, Svetov began blogging in LiveJournal. The first mention of libertarianism appeared on his blog in 2005 when Svetov was 20 years old. Although, as the politician claims, he has always been an "ardent libertarian." Shortly before leaving for Japan, while in Moscow, Svetov joined the Libertarian Party.

In 2010, Svetov left for Japan where he learned Japanese and also sold souvenirs on the Internet. It was there that Svetov first invested in Bitcoin, which became the key to his material well-being. In 2011 Svetov was interviewed as an eyewitness by Russia-1 about the 2011 Tōhoku earthquake and the subsequent Fukushima Daiichi nuclear disaster.

In 2016, he graduated from the New Zealand Film Academy. A short film, "Jackpot", was written by Svetov and released in New Zealand, winning first place in the state script competition and receiving sponsorship for a feature length adaptation. For some time, Svetov worked in the film industry. He has participated in the production of the unreleased film Icaria.

== Political activity ==
In 2016, after returning to Russia from Japan, Svetov began his socio-political activities for the Libertarian Party. He helped in the election campaign of Vera Kichanova and Andrei Shalnev. He also helped with the organization of the eighth readings of Adam Smith and organized the visit of Director of the Cato Institute Peter Goetler to read. He organized meetings and helped with the translation of the speeches of foreign guests.

Svetov was the organizer of many opposition rallies: “For Free Internet” on August 26, 2017; a rally against the blocking of Telegram in Russia on April 30, 2018; and a rally against pension reform on July 29, 2018. He initiated a public campaign against the "law of Klishas" on the “sovereign Internet” and launched a petition against the adoption of this law, which collected 122 thousand signatures. Svetov also became one of the organizers of the rally in defense of the Internet in Moscow on March 10, 2019, and also spoke at it. Similar rallies also took place in Khabarovsk and Voronezh. After that, the Kremlin’s Telegram channels began to spread an “investigation” about the fact that the real customer of the rally was the video blogger PewDiePie.

Flag of Russian Libertarianism by Mikhail Svetov

In May 2018, Svetov presented the flag of Russian libertarianism – the Gadsden snake against the background of the Russian national tricolor of 1914. According to Svetov’s idea, this flag was to become a universal symbol for all libertarians of Russia, combining the political and philosophical convictions of the supporters of freedom with patriotism and Russian national culture.

On January 18, 2018, Svetov debated with Vladimir Milov on the topic of the presidential campaign of Alexei Navalny and came out as the winner according to the results of the ballot. In August, Svetov met and talked with U.S. Republican Senator Rand Paul.

After the adviser to the Ukrainian president Volodymyr Zelenskyy, Ruslan Stefanchuk, stated that the ideology of the "Servant of the People" party was libertarianism, Svetov issued a text questioning the party’s commitment to libertarian values and, at the request of RTVI, made a small test for understanding libertarianism for Zelenskyy himself.

Svetov acted as the inviting organizer of the lecture of Hans-Hermann Hoppe. The lecture was held on October 6, 2019, in Moscow, where Hoppe described the destructive power of democracy, its incompatibility with individual freedom and the natural union between Western conservatism and libertarianism. Svetov also spoke at the event.

On July 31, 2019, Svetov was arrested and imprisoned for 30 days for holding an Unsanctioned Rally that drew an estimated crowd of 20,000 people. Svetov, his party, and other activists and politicians wanted to hold a rally in front of Lubyanka Square to allow actual oppositions candidates to stand for the 2021 Russian legislative election.

In 2021, Svetov was arrested for nine days for holding a rally in support of Alexei Navalny.

Svetov has been extremely vocal about his opposition to sanctions on Russians and Russia as a whole due to the Russian invasion of Ukraine, so much so that other Russian opposition figures and outlets have begun to describe him as being damaging to the overall Russian opposition cause. Namely, Svetov vehemently attacked Sergei Guriev, Sergei Aleksashenko, and Maria Snegovaya, three high profile exiled Russian economists who have collaborated with western governments to target Russians tied to the war as part of the International Working Group on Russian Sanctions.

On November 18, 2022, Svetov was added to the list of foreign agents.

In 2023, a criminal case was opened against Svetov on charges of "rehabilitation of Nazism," for talking about Stepan Bandera in a "positive way." In 2021, on his Telegram channel Svetov sang the song Ah, Bandera, Ukrainian Apostle! which at the time was heavily criticized by Vladislav Pozdnyakov, founder of Male State. In response to the case, Svetov stated: "I feel that I have fallen into the first league of enemies of Putin’s regime. I love Russia and worry about it. I worry about myself much less. I hope this nightmare will end soon. No to war."

== Political views ==
=== Libertarianism ===
Svetov calls himself an ideological anarcho-capitalist. He believes that only through lustration and ensuring the functioning of the free market can corruption and the economic decline of Russia be overcome. In addition, Svetov is a supporter of such ideas as: federalism, freedom of association, laissez-faire, legalization of weapons, drugs and abortion and reducing the role of the state in the life of a child such eliminating juvenile justice and increasing the ability of private foundations to directly help children.

=== Right conservatism ===
Svetov identifies himself with cultural conservatism. He stands for traditional relations and the separation of gender roles in the family. According to Svetov, the family was unjustly scolded by the left, and third-wave feminism which did a disservice to women, making them more miserable. According to Svetov, he would like to live in a homogeneous society somewhere in Kamchatka, having acquired a ranch and a large family.

=== Civic nationalism ===
Svetov would like Russia to cease to be the multinational state that Yeltsin made it, and become a national state according to the principle of Switzerland – “they speak four languages, live in four different nations, practice different religions, but at the same time everyone lives in peace and harmony; they are Swiss, and we are Russians”. As a civic nationalist, Svetov is a supporter of building a Russian civil nation and reviving the tradition of Russian identity.

=== Education ===
Having been homeschooled himself, Svetov has named homeschooling "the best thing that ever happened to him in his formative years." He opposes compulsory education in public schools, seeing them as a threat to each family's right to privacy. Apart from his advocacy for homeschooling and education within a family, he supports school choice and a voucher system of funding for primary and secondary education, due to its emphasis on each individual rather than a particular public school entity. Svetov has named the United States and Russia as the two most liberal countries in regards to homeschooling legislation.

== Attitude to other political organizations ==
Svetov criticizes the activities of parties and movements, which he calls pseudo-opposition, such as Yabloko, PARNAS, Left Front, Democratic Choice, Party of Growth.

As of 2021, Svetov sees only Alexei Navalny and the Anti-Corruption Fund as the only ally in the struggle against government in Russia, but he would be glad to see other sincere opposition forces, regardless of their political orientation.

== Incidents ==
On April 30, 2018, he spoke at a rally in Moscow in support of the Telegram messenger, and called for lustrations. He believes that because of this appeal, some media outlets, such as Meduza, TV Rain and Znak.com, did not cite his speech and also mentioned him as the organizer of the rally, as they were preparing for the next “change in the position of the nomenclature”.

On September 20, 2018 in Saint Petersburg, Svetov was subjected to a failed attempt at an armed attack. During the meeting, one of the members of the LPR regional branch who was present at her, after a short skirmish with Svetov, took out a knife and attempted to attack him. Following the results of the proceedings on this incident, the LPR member who attempted the attack was expelled from the party for violating the Charter. Also, following the results of the proceedings on September 27, 2018, at an extraordinary meeting of the LPR Federal Committee, some representatives of the governing and audit bodies of the Saint Petersburg regional branch were excluded, acquitting the aggressor, accusing Svetov of provoking aggression and convicted of external control of the branch, systematic lying to party members and provoking a split inside branches.

In July 2019, the Ukrainian website Mirotvorets added Svetov to its list of people posing a threat to Ukraine's national security, citing his trip to Crimea to his girlfriend.

In November 2019, Svetov was placed under investigation for sexual misconduct for engaging in a romantic relationship in 2012 with a 16 year old when he was 27. The case was opened due to a sexually suggestive photo of Svetov's ex-girlfriend, Anastasia Starodubovskaya, that he posted on his Instagram. The head of the Libertarian Party, Sergei Boiko, claimed that the investigation was politically motivated, and was an effort to try and make Svetov willingly go into exile.
