= Voice Libertarian Conservative Party =

Voice Libertarian Conservative Party Ձայն ազատական պահպանողական կուսակցություն Dzayn azatakan pahpanoghakan kusakts’ut’yun
- Leader: Arusyak Hayrapetyan
- Founded: 28 March 2021
- Headquarters: Yerevan
- Ideology: Libertarian conservatism
- Political position: Centre-right
- International affiliation: International Alliance of Libertarian Parties (observer)
- National Assembly: 0 / 107

Website
- dzain.am

The Voice Libertarian Conservative Party (Armenian: Ձայն ազատական պահպանողական կուսակցություն, romanized: Dzayn azatakan pahpanoghakan kusakts’ut’yun) is an Armenian political party. It was founded in 2021 and is currently led by Arusyak Hayrapetyan.

== History ==
The party held its founding congress on 28 March 2021 and Arusyak Hayrapetyan was nominated as party Chairwoman. Hayrapetyan was the former Director of the Armenian-French Chamber of Commerce. The party does not maintain any representation within the National Assembly and currently acts as an extra-parliamentary force.

The party stated that it would be open to the idea of creating a political alliance with other parties to participate in the 2021 Armenian parliamentary election but ultimately did not participate.

== Ideology ==
The party advocates for allowing maximum freedoms to citizens, minimizing government interference in the economy, supporting governmental decentralization, personal empowerment, and individualism, including the practice of local referendums to address potential community issues. The party also supports lowering taxes and making government run more efficiently. The party is skeptical of Armenia's membership in the Collective Security Treaty Organization and supports closer ties between Armenia and the European Union.

== See also ==
- List of libertarian political parties
- Programs of political parties in Armenia
