= Russian Libertarian Movement =

Former political party

The Russian Libertarian Movement (Rossiyskoye Libertarianskoye Dvizhenie, RLD) was a short-lived political party in the Russian Federation. It was formed in 2003 by Vladimir Didenko, at the time vice president of the Institute of Natiology (Moscow), a libertarian think-tank, Igor Souzdaltsev, also involved with the Institute, and other members of an organizing committee meeting on August 22, 2003.

== Platform ==
Major platform planks called for the establishment of widespread property rights, and the right of citizens to keep and bear arms.

== History ==
On August 25, two days after the RLD's founding, the Russian Ministry of Justice confirmed official registration of the RLD as the first libertarian political party in Russia. The party went public with a Moscow news conference on September 6. The new party's offices were located on the campus of Moscow State University.

On September 9, 2003, the party nominated its founding chairman, Didenko (formerly a lawyer), to be the first Libertarian candidate for the University Electoral District # 201 in Moscow seat in the State Duma. The election was held on December 7, 2003. Didenko did not win enough votes to win the office.

In late 2003, leaders of the RLD visited the national headquarters of the U.S. Libertarian Party, to exchange ideas and anecdotes. Also in 2003, both Souzdaltsev and Didenko attended a conference of the International Society for Individual Liberty (ISIL) in Vilnius, Lithuania, where they networked with libertarian activists from around the world.

== Dissolution ==
By late 2006, the RLD had mostly disbanded.

== See also ==
- International Society for Individual Liberty
- Liberalism in Russia
- Libertarian Party of Russia
- Libertarianism
- List of libertarian political parties (international)
- Political parties in Russia
