= Libertarian Society of Iceland =

Political organization

The Libertarian Society of Iceland (Icelandic: Frjálshyggjufélagið) was founded in Reykjavík, Iceland, on August 10, 2002. As the name suggests it is established on the ideals of libertarianism. It is currently the only active propertarian libertarian organization in Iceland.

The society aims at promoting the values of a free-market economy and individual liberty to the Icelandic public.

== People ==
- Jóhannes Loftsson

== See also ==
- Anarchism in Iceland
- Icelandic Commonwealth
