= Dale Franks =

American author and commentator

Dale Franks (born 1964) is an American author and commentator. Currently, he is an editor of the weblog QandO Online Magazine. He also presents a weekly internet podcast, Observations, under the aegis of QandO. Franks was formerly publisher and editor of the website The New Libertarian. All of these current projects are co-produced with Bruce McQuain, and were previously co-produced with Jon Henke as well.

From 1993 to 1996, Franks was the host of The Business Day, a daily, four-hour business and financial news program on KMNY Radio in Los Angeles, California. From 2002–2004, he was a contributing writer on military and international affairs for TechCentralStation.
