= Libertarian Party of Russia =

Libertarian Party of Russia Либертарианская Партия России
- Abbreviation: LPR (English); ЛПР (Russian)
- Leader: Boris Fedyukin (disputed) or Yaroslav Conway (disputed)
- Founded: 15 April 2008; 18 years ago
- Headquarters: Moscow, Russia
- Membership: 1,000 (2017)
- Ideology: Right-libertarianism; Minarchism; Factions: Anti-statism; Anarcho-capitalism
- International affiliation: International Alliance of Libertarian Parties; Interlibertarians
- Colours: Orange; Gold; Black
- Slogan: "Minimum of state, maximum of freedom!" (Russian: "Минимум государства, максимум свободы!")
- Seats in the State Duma: 0 / 450
- Seats in the Regional Parliaments: 0 / 3,994

Party flag

Website
- lp-russia.org libertarian-party.ru

The Libertarian Party of Russia (Russian: Либертарианская партия России; ЛПР, romanized: Libertarianskaya partiya Rossii; LPR) is a libertarian political party in the Russian Federation founded in 2008 based on the principles of "self-ownership and non-aggression". The party has had two members elected to local office, one in Moscow and the other in Moscow Oblast. The first, Vera Kichanova, was elected in 2012 to the municipal council of the Yuzhnoye Tushino District of Moscow. The second, Andrey Shalnev, was elected in 2014 as an independent deputy councilman for the Pushkinsky District.

The party coordinates the Adam Smith Forum (an annual international libertarian conference in Moscow), participates in the organization of the Free People's Forum (which discusses Russian politics), and runs other activities and publications, including a monthly newspaper and a podcast series.

In 2013, the party denounced the government's ban on "gay propaganda", and its subsequent amendments, which banned the promotion of LGBTQ-related content to children, stating that it violated the right to freedom of speech.

Since 2017, the SVTV YouTube channel of Mikhail Svetov, a member of the Federal Party Committee, has become very popular. The independent activity of regional offices has significantly increased. As of June 2017, the party had just over 1,000 members, including about 200 in the Moscow branch.

In 2020, there was a split in the party. As of 2026, there are two different organizations calling themselves the Libertarian Party of Russia and using the same symbols.

In 2022 the start of Russia's invasion of Ukraine led to many party members having to leave Russia due to increased persecution by the state.

== See also ==
- Democratic Union (Russia)
- Russian Libertarian Movement
