= The American as Anarchist =

1978 book by David DeLeon

- First edition
- Author: David DeLeon
- Subject: American history
- Published: 1978 (Johns Hopkins University Press)
- Pages: 242
- ISBN: 0-801-82126-6

The American as Anarchist: Reflections on Indigenous Radicalism is a history book about the role of Protestantism, capitalism, and American geography in developing American libertarian sentiment.

== Reception ==
Paul Avrich was disappointed by the book and felt that it covered too much ground with too little specificity. He said it was closer to a "loosely reasoned interpretive essay" than a scholarly monograph, with frequent factual errors and misspelled names. The bibliography, he added, was indiscriminate and too long for the book's scope.
