= Iraq Freedom Congress =

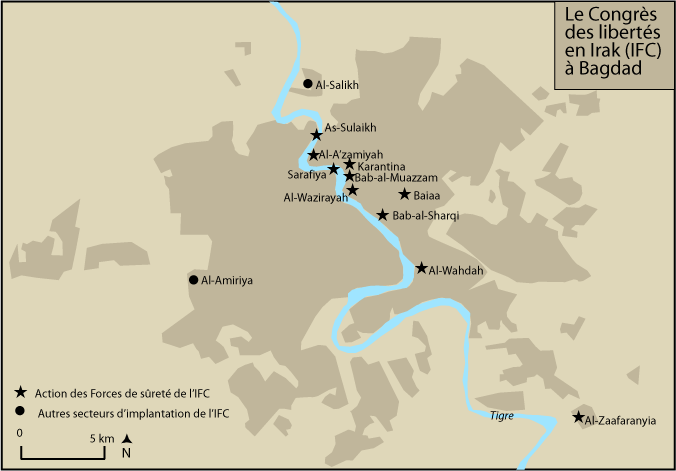
IFC security forces in Baghdad

The Iraq Freedom Congress (or Iraqi Freedom Congress, IFC) is a libertarian socialist, progressive, democratic, and secularist political party. The Congress was formed in March 2005 by labor groups, women's groups, students, and neighborhood groups concerned about sectarian violence, Ba'athism, Islamism, and nationalism, as well as the post-war occupation.

The Congress has been active in protests, most recently regarding post-occupation security and checkpoint policy.
