= Libertarian Party (UK) =

Political party in the United Kingdom

- Leader: Martin Day
- Founded: 21 November 2007; 18 years ago
- Headquarters: 57 Newtown Road, Brighton, East Sussex, BN3 7BA
- Youth wing: Young Libertarians
- Ideology: Libertarianism; Classical liberalism
- International affiliation: International Alliance of Libertarian Parties
- Scottish affiliate: Scottish Libertarian Party
- Colours: Blue Gold

Website
- libertarianpartyuk.com

The Libertarian Party, also known as the Libertarian Party UK (LPUK), is a libertarian political party in the United Kingdom. The party believes in having a written constitution for the UK which holds "the individual to be above the State".

The LPUK only stands candidates in England, Wales and Northern Ireland because of a legal agreement with the Scottish Libertarian Party. Further, the LPUK was also formerly known as the LPoEWNI (Libertarian Party of England, Wales and Northern Ireland) so as not to mislead voters into thinking that it covered the whole of the United Kingdom.

== History ==
The party was founded in January 2008 under the leadership of Patrick Vessey, having registered the party with the Electoral Commission in November 2007. In May 2008, Daily Telegraph lead writer Alex Singleton claimed the founders should have set up a pressure group rather than a party. Singleton believed the new party would reduce the influence of libertarianism.

On 17 September 2008, Vessey resigned as party leader and was replaced by Ian Parker-Joseph. The party claimed a membership of 1,000 and hoped in the wake of the parliamentary expenses scandal "to establish themselves in the media landscape with a couple of robust performances". He said the party wanted much smaller government and would initially cut taxation to 10% before removing it altogether. In November 2008 the party sent every sitting MP a copy of George Orwell's Nineteen Eighty-Four, inscribed with the admonition that "this book was a warning, not a blueprint".

On 28 November 2010, Andrew Withers was elected as party leader. He was one of the signatories of the agreement with the Scottish Libertarian Party and reluctantly signed despite his displeasure of conceding ground to the new Scottish branch of the party.

Following an internal ballot on 15 August 2015, party members elected Adam Brown as the party leader.

During the 2018 local elections, the party was described as on "the fringes of mainstream British politics". A party spokesperson said: "This alludes to the fact that this party is the only party to have been constant about the need to reduce taxation and government expenditure."

In October 2018, MEP Bill Etheridge, a former member of the UK Independence Party (UKIP), joined the party and became its deputy chairman. Etheridge continued as a member of the Europe of Freedom and Direct Democracy parliamentary group in the European Parliament. However, he then left to join the Brexit Party in February 2019.

In January 2026 the LPUK announced Dan Clarke as their candidate for the Gorton and Denton by-election and obtained 47 votes, finishing 9th ahead of the SDP and Communist League.

Clarke was then also selected as the party's candidate for the 2026 Makerfield by-election.

== Policies ==
=== Constitution ===
The party proposes a written constitution for the UK that upholds "freedom of thought, speech, religion, association and enterprise as well as the rule of law."

=== Digital Freedoms ===
The party claims that "the removal of online content is tantamount to burning books and should be met with the same level of suspicion."

The party opposes legislation such as the Online Safety Act and the use of facial recognition surveillance, and aims to "align artificial general intelligence with autonomy, not authority."

=== Immigration ===
The party states that "unauthorised entry via the English Channel undermines public trust and the integrity of the asylum system, and cannot form part of a sustainable or fair policy."

=== Refugees ===
On refugees, the party's position is that "a free society respects the right of people to flee war, persecution, and tyranny. The United Kingdom should honour this principle not by expanding state power, but by offering targeted, principled, and humane support to individuals and families escaping authoritarian regimes."

=== Housing ===
The party's housing policy was written in collaboration with architect and academic Patrik Schumacher, calling for the deregulation of Britain's planning system to address the chronic undersupply of housing.

=== Environment ===
The LPUK's environmental policy asserts that "Libertarianism, far from being indifferent to environmental concerns, offers an alternative paradigm: one rooted in decentralised responsibility, legal accountability, and a respect for both human autonomy and natural systems."

The party supports conservation and pollution reduction through property rights, market incentives, nuclear energy, and opposition to net-zero regulation and state overreach.

=== Drugs ===
The Libertarian Party drugs policy advocates ending prohibition in favour of “cognitive liberty,” the principle that individuals should control their own consciousness and mental states, provided they do not harm others. It distinguishes this from mere legalisation by framing drug use primarily as a civil liberty issue rather than a public health or criminal justice matter.

== List of leaders ==
- Patrick Vessey (January 2008 – 17 September 2008)
- Ian Parker-Joseph (17 September 2008 – 28 November 2010)
- Andrew Withers (28 November 2010 – 15 August 2015)
- Adam Brown (from 15 August 2015 – 2021)
- Martin Day (2021–2025)
- Alex Zychowski (July 2025 – July 2026)
- Martin Day (current)

== Electoral performance ==
=== General elections ===
2010 general election
Constituency	Candidate	Votes	%
Devizes	Nic Coome	141	0.3
Sutton and Cheam	Martin Cullip	41	0.1

The party did not field parliamentary candidates at the 2015 general election, describing it as a "waste of time and funds".

2017 general election
Constituency	Candidate	Votes	%
Basingstoke	Scott Neville	213	0.4
Blaydon	Michael Marchetti	114	0.2
Kingston upon Hull West and Hessle	Will Taylor	67	0.2
Portsmouth North	Joe Jenkins	130	0.3

2019 general election
Constituency	Candidate	Votes	%
Chichester	Adam Brown	224	0.4
Crewe & Nantwich	Andrew Kinsman	149	0.3
Leicestershire North West	Dan Liddicott	140	0.3
Sevenoaks	Sean Finch	295	0.6
Stroud	Glenville Gogerly	567	0.9

2024 general election
Constituency	Candidate	Votes	%
North East Hampshire	Alex Zychowski	69	0.1
Ynys Môn	Sam Wood	44	0.1

=== By-elections ===
2009

Election	Candidate	Votes	%	Position
Norwich North	Thomas Burridge	36	0.1	11th

2018

Election	Candidate	Votes	%	Position
Lewisham East	Sean Finch	38	0.2	11th

2026

Election	Candidate	Votes	%	Position
Gorton and Denton	Dan Clarke	47	0.1	9th
Makerfield	Dan Clarke	18	0.04	11th

== See also ==
- Classical liberalism
- Liberalism in the United Kingdom
- Libertarianism in the United Kingdom
- Right-libertarianism
- Scottish Libertarian Party
