= Classical Liberal Party (Sweden) =

Political party in Sweden

Classical Liberal Party Klassiskt liberala partiet
- Abbreviation: KLP
- Chairperson: Magnus Jönsson
- Founded: December 2004
- Youth wing: Fri ungdom
- Ideology: Classical liberalism Libertarianism; Hard Euroscepticism
- International affiliation: International Alliance of Libertarian Parties
- Colours: Yellow Black
- Parliament: 0 / 349
- European Parliament: 0 / 20
- Counties: 0 / 1,662
- Municipalities: 0 / 12,978

Website
- www.liberalapartiet.se

The Classical Liberal Party (Swedish: Klassiskt liberala partiet; KLP), also known as the Liberal Party (Swedish: Liberala partiet), is a classical liberal and libertarian political party in Sweden founded in 2004.

The leader of the party is Magnus Jönsson. The party has its headquarters in Stockholm and regional representatives in Jönköping and Linköping.

== Ideology ==
The following quote is taken from the English information section of the party's official website:

We in Liberala partiet (Classical liberal party) are classically minded liberals. We believe in a society where individuals are given power over their own lives. A society that gives priority to the individual, where duty cannot be imposed, and individuals cannot be made victims of a forced collective. Free and sovereign individuals are free to shape their own relationships and associations with other free and sovereign individuals.

== Electoral history ==
=== Riksdag ===
The Classical Liberal Party has participated in four general elections for the Swedish Riksdag. Their best result was in the 2018 general elections when the party got 1,504 votes, or 0.02%.

Election year	Votes	%	Seats	+/−	Government
2006	202	0.00 (#22)	0 / 349	New	Extra-parliamentary
2010	716	0.00 (#15)	0 / 349	0	Extra-parliamentary
2014	1,210	0.02 (#18)	0 / 349	0	Extra-parliamentary
2018	1,504	0.02 (#19)	0 / 349	0	Extra-parliamentary
2022	344	0.01 (#26)	0 / 349	0	Extra-parliamentary
2026	162	0.00 (#29)	0 / 349	0	Extra-parliamentary

=== European Parliament ===
KLP has participated in two elections for the European Parliament. It first campaigned during the 2014 European Parliament election, although it was also eligible to participate in previous election in 2009.

Election	Votes	% of overall votes	Seats	+/-
2009	Did not run			
2014	492	0.01 (#13)	0 / 20	New
2019	702 ▲	0.02 (#20)	0 / 20	Steady
