= Dawn of Liberty Party =

Far-right political party in South Korea

Dawn of Liberty Party 자유의새벽당
- Abbreviation: Dawn; DOL
- Leader: Kang Ki-hoon
- Secretary-General: Kim Kyo-ha
- Founder: Park Gyeol
- Founded: 10 July 2018
- Registered: 15 July 2019
- Legalised: 9 July 2019
- Dissolved: 22 March 2024
- Headquarters: Changcheon-dong, Myeongmool Street, Seodaemun District, Seoul
- Membership (2019): 6,113
- Ideology: Classical liberalism
- Political position: Right-wing to far-right
- Colours: Black; White; Red
- Slogan: Korea First; Make South Korea Great Again

Website
- http://dawnofliberty.kr/

- Dawn of Liberty Party
- Hangul: 자유의새벽당
- Hanja: 自由의새벽黨
- RR: Jayuui saebyeokdang
- MR: Chayuŭi saebyŏktang

The Dawn of Liberty Party (DLP; Korean: 자유의새벽당) was a classical liberal, self-proclaimed alt-right political party in South Korea founded in 2018 by Park Gyeol.

== History ==
The party was founded on 10 July 2018 by Park Gyeol, who is also the president of a resting place named Lounge Liberty. During this time, it was not officially a political party yet. The official formation was on 9 July 2019, and was officially registered under National Election Commission 6 days after the official establishment.

The party participated in the 2020 election. Its president, Park Gyeol, declared to run for a seat in the Jongro District of Seoul, rather than for a proportional representation seat.

== Ideology ==
The party criticised the Liberty Korea Party as "too left-leaning" and "similar to Democratic Party of Korea". It declares itself as "the first right-liberal political party of South Korea". Although the party does not agree with the illegalisation of same-sex marriage as a "liberal" party, the party also does not support the Anti-discrimination Law that could prohibit the criticisms toward the issue.

It also sought to prioritise the locals, and says that the government should not simply give citizenship to any foreigners that can "pollute" the locals.

Its economic policies were also of a liberal market economy, calling for the private ownership of property, freedom of contract, tax cuts, and the abolition of inheritance tax. The party opposed the government interventions, mentioning that the planned economy cannot overtake the market economy. It also criticized trade unions who "prevent the new employments".

Unlike the other right-wing parties, i.e. Liberty Korea Party and/or Our Republican Party whose supporters are usually older than 50, the Dawn of Liberty Party mainly targeted young voters in their 20s and 30s. The party wanted to lower the minimum age requirement to become the President of the Republic, citing examples such as Emmanuel Macron (who became President of France at 39) and Jacinda Ardern (who became Prime Minister of New Zealand at 37).

== Elections results ==
Election	Leader	Constituency				Party list				Seats		Position	Status
Election	Leader	Votes	%	Seats	+/-	Votes	%	Seats	+/-	No.	+/–	Position	Status
2020	Kang Ki-hoon					101,819	0.36	0 / 47	new	0 / 300	new	13th	Opposition

== See also ==
- Liberal parties by country
- Liberalism in South Korea
- Antifeminism
- Alt-lite
- Angry young man (South Korea)
