= Libertarian Party (Belgium) =

Political party in Belgium

Libertarian Party Parti libertarien
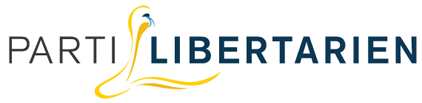
- Abbreviation: PLib
- Leader: Baudouin Collard
- Founded: 2012
- Dissolved: 2023
- Headquarters: Brussels
- Ideology: Libertarianism; Euroscepticism
- Political position: Right-wing
- International affiliation: International Alliance of Libertarian Parties
- Colours: Gold

Website
- http://plib.be

The Libertarian Party (French: Parti Libertarien, pronounced [paʁti libɛʁtaʁjɛ̃]) was a political party in Belgium, which operated in Wallonia and the Brussels Region, in the French Community and in the German-speaking Community of Belgium.

== History ==
The party was launched in November 2012.

In the 2014 general election, the Libertarian Party decided to run on its own, rejecting alliance proposals from the liberal-conservative party La Droite and the liberal party Union des Libéraux (UdL). The party only managed to present one list for the federal election (in Brussels). As for the regional and community parliaments, the PLib was only present in the Brussels-Capital Region and the German-speaking Community.

On 6 March 2015, the party was one of the 12 founding members of the International Alliance of Libertarian Parties (IALP).

In the 2018 provincial elections, several members of the Libertarian Party joined the grouping of small parties called Independents, including former president Pierre-Yves Novalet. Indépendants was formed by former members of DéFI and MR, as well as small local parties and the BUB. This alliance was only present in Walloon Brabant. They received 3,046 votes (1.29%) and no-one was elected.

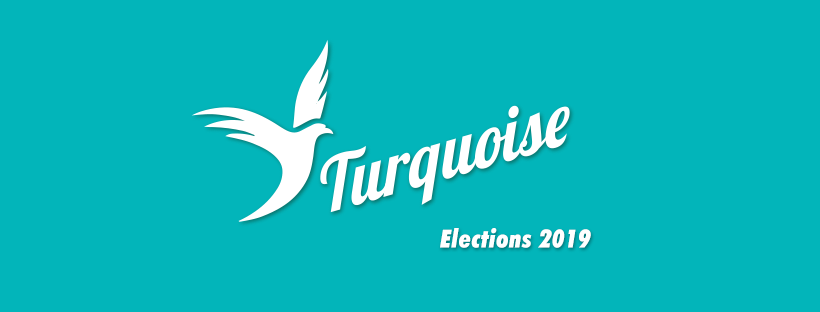
Logo of Liste Turquoise

For the 2019 legislative elections, the party participated under the name of Liste Turquoise; at the same time, the party opened up their lists to candidates already present within the ‘Independents’ group, such as Vincent Granville. The Libertarian Party only fielded candidates on the Liste Turquoise, which was only present in Walloon Brabant for the federal and Walloon regional elections.

The party was dissolved in 2023 due to a lack of activity.

== Presidents ==
- 2012-2016: Patrick Smets
- 2016-2017: Pierre-Yves Novalet
- 2017-2023: Baudouin Collard

== Election results ==
=== Chamber of Representatives ===
Election	Votes	%	Seats	+/−	Government
2014	750	0.01	0 / 150	New	Extra-parliamentary
2019	626	0.01	0 / 150	0	Extra-parliamentary

=== Regional ===
==== Brussels Parliament ====
Election	Votes	%		Seats	+/-	Government
Election	Votes	F.E.C.	Overall	Seats	+/-	Government
2014	464	0.11		0 / 75	New	Extra-parliamentary

==== Parliament of the German-speaking Community ====
Election	Votes	%	Seats	+/−	Government
2014	432	1.15	0 / 25	New	Extra-parliamentary

==== Walloon Parliament ====
Election	Votes	%	Seats	+/−	Government
2019	590	0.03	0 / 75	New	Extra-parliamentary
