= Ladies of Liberty Alliance =

American-based political organization

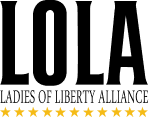
- Founded: 2009
- Type: 501(c)(3) organization
- Purpose: Libertarianism, Women's empowerment
- Location: Washington D.C.
- Region served: United States, Europe, Latin America, Brazil, Asia, Africa
- Key people: Nena Whitfield (President), Holly Jean Soto (Director of Operations)
- Website: http://ladiesofliberty.org/

The Ladies of Liberty Alliance (LOLA) is a network of women leaders who, through their careers and/or personal endeavors, are dedicated to spreading the ideas of individual liberty and free markets. Participation in the Ladies of Liberty Alliance is open to any female who identifies with or wishes to explore libertarian ideas.

LOLA participation is free and self-defined.

== Founding ==
In 2009, a group of women concerned about the shortage of female leaders started a group to address this and called themselves the Ladies of Liberty Alliance (LOLA). For the next three years, LOLA volunteers worked to build a network of libertarian women. Volunteers spoke at events, conducted outreach, and built a support network.

In 2011, the demand for LOLA from women around the country drove the decision to officially establish Ladies of Liberty Alliance as a full-time, non-profit educational organization under the direction of Nena Whitfield.

== LOLA's Training Programs ==
- LOLA Leadership Retreats
- Maria Oropeza Activism Fellowship
- Basic Economics with Holly Jean

== LOLA's Impacts ==
- 200+ Chapters
- 60+ Chapters
- 2,200+ Active Members
- 1,507+ Events

== Social chapters ==
LOLA Social Chapters are ladies only social groups located over 55+ countries and has chapters around the globe.

Prior to 2017, the Ladies of Liberty Alliance existed solely in the United States; the organization later expanded to Canada, Israel, and Northern Ireland. LOLA experienced significant growth in 2018 when they expanded to South America, Africa, Europe and Asia.

Currently, LOLA social chapters are active in 60+ countries across the globe:

=== North America ===
- LOLA Tewksbury, MA
- LOLA Austin, TX
- LOLA Atlanta, GA
- LOLA Billings, MT
- LOLA Central NY, NY
- LOLA Charlotte, NC
- LOLA Chicago, IL
- LOLA Connecticut, CT
- LOLA Electra Texas, TX
- LOLA Kansas City, KS
- LOLA Wichita, KS
- LOLA Los Angeles, CA
- LOLA Miami, FL
- LOLA Montana, MT
- LOLA Nashville, TN
- LOLA New Hampshire, NH
- LOLA New York, NY
- LOLA North Texas, TX
- LOLA Trenton, NJ
- LOLA Oklahoma, OK
- LOLA Omaha, NE
- LOLA Ottawa, Canada
- LOLA Calgary, Canada
- LOLA Raleigh, NC
- LOLA Sacramento, CA
- LOLA San Jose, CA
- LOLA Seattle, WA
- LOLA South Florida, FL
- LOLA Spokane, WA
- LOLA Toronto, Canada
- LOLA University of Cumberlands, KY
- LOLA Virginia Beach, VA
- LOLA Vancouver, Canada
- LOLA Washington D.C.
- LOLA West Michigan, MI
- LOLA Wisconsin, WI
- LOLA Georgetown, TX
- LOLA Memphis, TN
- LOLA SeaTac, WA
- LOLA Pennsylvania
- LOLA San Francisco, CA
- LOLA University of Rhode Island, RI
- LOLA Iowa State University, IA
- LOLA Central Florida, FL
- LOLA USA

=== Africa ===
- LOLA Nairobi, Kenya
- LOLA Harare, Zimbabwe
- LOLA Mutare, Zimbabwe
- LOLA Abuja, Nigeria
- LOLA Oyo, Nigeria
- LOLA Ibadan, Nigeria
- LOLA Ife, Nigeria
- LOLA Osun, Nigeria
- LOLA Lagos, Nigeria
- LOLA Acra, Ghana
- LOLA Buyumbura, Burundi
- LOLA Kinsasa, DRC
- LOLA Kigali, Rwanda
- LOLA Kampala, Uganda
- LOLA Dodoma, Tanzania
- LOLA Oshogbo, Nigeria
- LOLA Lilongwe, Malawi
- LOLA Yaounde, Cameroon
- LOLA Windhoek, Namibia
- LOLA Maputo, Mozambique
- LOLA Livingstone, Zambia
- LOLA Kumasi, Ghana

=== Europe ===
- LOLA Tel Aviv, Israel
- LOLA Jerusalem, Israel
- LOLA Madrid, Spain
- LOLA Frankfurt, Germany
- LOLA London, UK
- LOLA Warsaw, Poland
- LOLA Krakow, Poland
- LOLA Tbilisi, Georgia
- LOLA Belfast, North Ireland
- LOLA Tallinn, Estonia
- LOLA Paris, France
- LOLA Tirana, Albania
- LOLA Sarajevo, Bosnia Herzegovina
- LOLA Istambul, Turkey
- LOLA Rome, Italy
- LOLA Kyiv, Ukraine
- LOLA Berlin, Germany
- LOLA Stuttgart, Germany
- LOLA Ravenna, Italy
- LOLA Kriva Palanka, North Macedonia
- LOLA Belgrade, Serbia
- LOLA Sofia, Bulgaria

=== Asia ===
- LOLA Colombo, Sri Lanka
- LOLA Kandy, Sri Lanka
- LOLA Ulaanbaatar, Mongolia
- LOLA Kathmandu, Nepal
- LOLA Dharan, Nepal
- LOLA Itahari, Nepal
- LOLA New Delhi, India
- LOLA Dhaka, Bangladesh
- LOLA Dinajpur, Bangladesh
- LOLA AMU, India
- LOLA Hyderabad, India
- LOLA Mumbai, India
- LOLA Peshawar, Pakistan
- LOLA Jakarta, Indonesia
- LOLA Ghaziabad, India
- LOLA Lucknow, India
- LOLA Mohali, India
- LOLA Chittagong, Bangladesh
- LOLA University of Chittagong, Bangladesh
- LOLA Bangalore, India
- LOLA Chirtral, Pakistan
- LOLA Abbottabad, Pakistan
- LOLA Haripur, Pakistan
- LOLA Islamabad, Pakistan
- LOLA Butwal, Nepal
- LOLA Pokhara, Nepal
- LOLA Karachi, Pakistan
- LOLA Amaravati, India
- LOLA Khulna, Bangladesh
- LOLA Barisal, Bangladesh
- LOLA Manila, Philippines
- LOLA Thimpu, Bhutan

=== Brazil ===
- LOLA Nova Friburgo, Rio de Janeiro
- LOLA Minas Gerais
- LOLA Paraiba
- LOLA Sao Paulo
- LOLA Distrito Federal
- LOLA Parana
- LOLA Santa Catarina
- LOLA Rio de Janeiro
- LOLA Para
- LOLA Ceara
- LOLA Rio Grande do Sul
- LOLA Alagoas
- LOLA Espirito Santo
- LOLA Amazonas
- LOLA Goias
- LOLA Joinville, Santa Catarina
- LOLA Rio Grande do Norte
- LOLA Sergipe
- LOLA Uberaba, Minas Gerais
- LOLA Pernambuco
- LOLA Recife, Pernambuco
- LOLA Maranhao
- LOLA Salvador, Bahia
- LOLA Mato Grosso do Sul
- LOLA Uberlandia, Minas Gerais
- LOLA Bauru, Sao Paulo
- LOLA Taubate, Sao Paulo
- LOLA Londrina, Parana
- LOLA Pocos de Caldas, Minas Gerais
- LOLA Florianopolis, Santa Catarina
- LOLA Petrolina, Pernambuco
- LOLA Joao Pessoa, Paraiba
- LOLA Rio Branco, Acre
- LOLA Itapetininga, Sao Paulo
- LOLA Niteroi, Rio de Janeiro

=== Latin America ===
- LOLA Mar Del Plata, Argentina
- LOLA Santiago del Estero, Argentina
- LOLA Mendoza, Argentina
- LOLA Buenos Aires, Argentina
- LOLA Cordoba, Argentina
- LOLA Santa Fe, Argentina
- LOLA Argentina
- LOLA Sucre, Bolivia
- LOLA Santa Cruz, Bolivia
- LOLA La Paz, Bolivia
- LOLA Cochabamba, Bolivia
- LOLA Tarija, Bolivia
- LOLA Santiago, Chile
- LOLA La Serena, Chile
- LOLA Barranquilla, Colombia
- LOLA Bogota, Colombia
- LOLA Cali, Colombia
- LOLA Medellin, Colombia
- LOLA Cartagena, Colombia
- LOLA Monteria, Colombia
- LOLA Quito, Ecuador
- LOLA Guayaquil, Ecuador
- LOLA Guatemala, Guatemala
- LOLA San Pedro Sula, Honduras
- LOLA Oaxaca, Mexico
- LOLA Chihuahua, Mexico
- LOLA Arequipa, Peru
- LOLA Misiones, Argentina
- LOLA Jujuy, Argentina
- LOLA San Pedro Jujuy, Argentina
- LOLA San Salvador, El Salvador
- LOLA Andahuaylas, Peru
- LOLA Mexico City, Mexico
- LOLA Guanajuato, Mexico
- LOLA Managua, Nicaragua
- LOLA Ciudad de Panama, Panama
- LOLA Asuncion, Paraguay
- LOLA Cusco, Peru
- LOLA Lima, Peru
- LOLA Montevideo, Uruguay
- LOLA Maracay, Venezuela
- LOLA Portuguesa, Venezuela
- LOLA Bolivar, Venezuela
- LOLA Caracas, Venezuela
- LOLA Carabobo, Venezuela
- LOLA Aragua, Venezuela
- LOLA Maracaibo, Venezuela
- LOLA Yaracuy, Venezuela
