= List of think tanks in the United States =

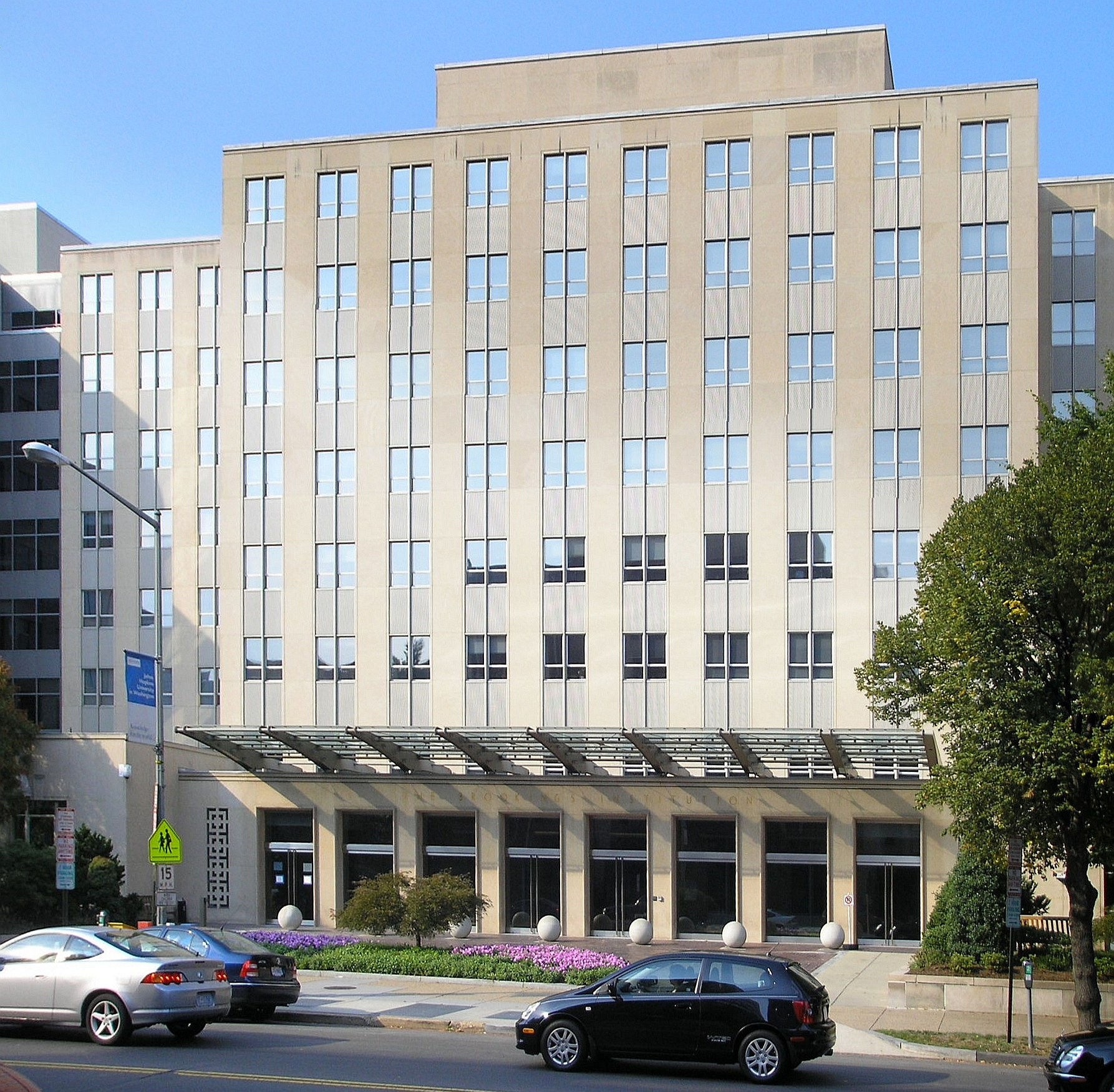
Brookings Institution, founded in 1916 in Washington, D.C.

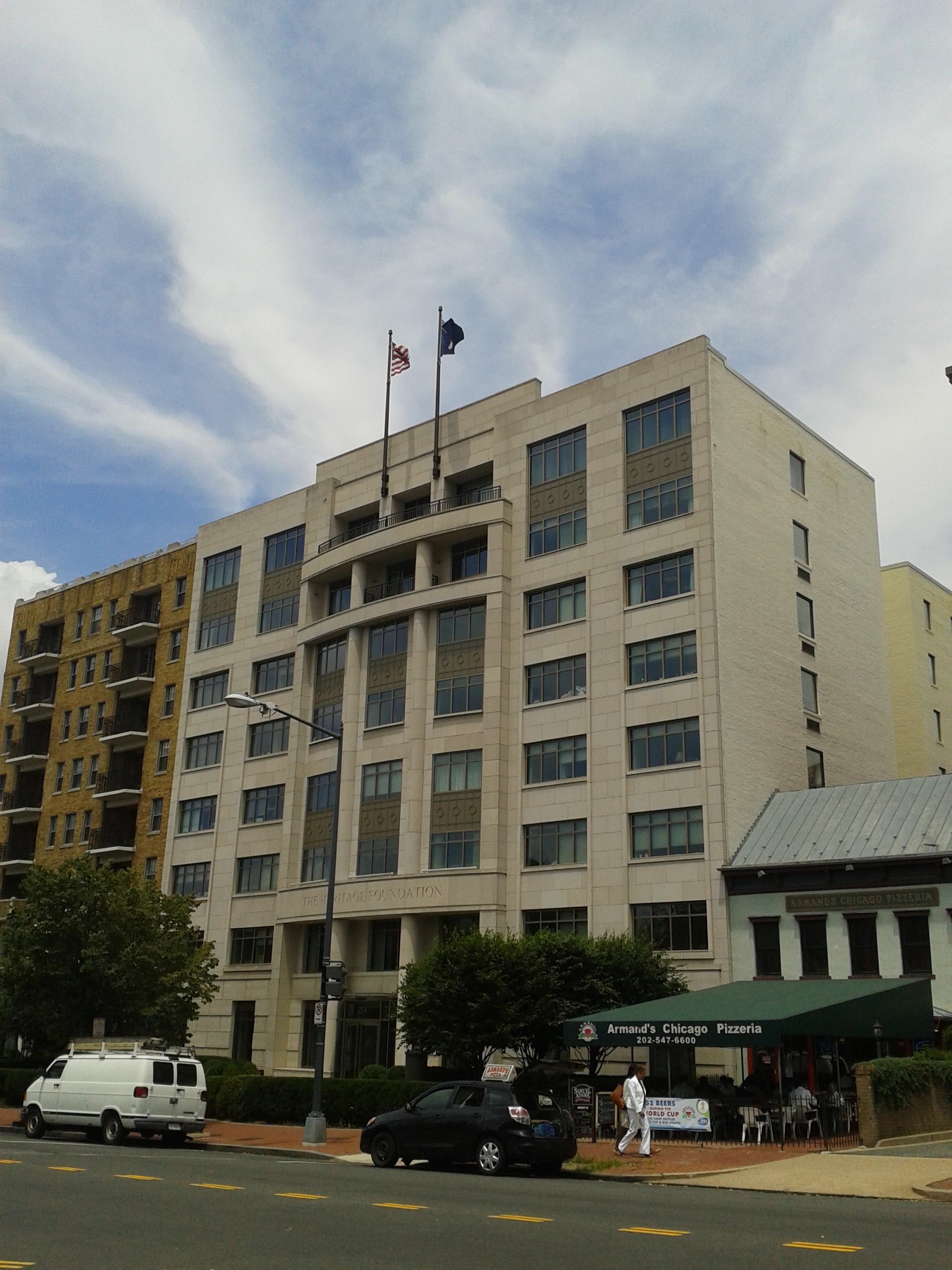
The Heritage Foundation, founded in 1973 in Washington, D.C.

This is a list of think tanks in the United States.

== Politics and economy ==
- Acton Institute
- Allegheny Institute for Public Policy
- America First Policy Institute
- American Action Forum
- American Civil Rights Union
- American College of Pediatricians
- American Enterprise Institute
- American Institute for Economic Research
- Atlas Network
- Ayn Rand Institute
- Beacon Center of Tennessee
- Beacon Hill Institute
- Berggruen Institute
- Bipartisan Policy Center
- Brookings Institution
- Buckeye Institute
- Caesar Rodney Institute
- Carnegie Endowment for International Peace
- Cascade Policy Institute
- Cato Institute
- Center for a Just Society
- Center for American Progress
- Center for Automotive Research
- Center for Development and Strategy
- Center for Economic and Policy Research
- Center for Freedom and Prosperity
- Center for Governmental Research
- Center for Immigration Studies
- Center for Media and Democracy
- Center for National Policy
- Center for Public Integrity
- Center for Public Justice
- Center for Strategic and Budgetary Assessments
- Center of the American Experiment
- Center on Budget and Policy Priorities
- Claremont Institute
- Committee for a Responsible Federal Budget
- Committee for Economic Development
- Competitive Enterprise Institute
- Concord Coalition
- Constitution Project
- Copenhagen Consensus Center
- Council on Competitiveness
- Demos
- Discovery Institute
- Drum Major Institute
- Economic Opportunity Institute
- Economic Policy Institute
- Evergreen Freedom Foundation
- Employment Policies Institute
- Eno Center for Transportation
- Ethics and Public Policy Center
- Every Texan
- Federation for American Immigration Reform
- Florida Institute for Sustainable Energy
- Foundation for Economic Education
- Future of American Democracy Foundation
- Goldwater Institute
- Group of Thirty
- Guttmacher Institute
- Hispanic American Center for Economic Research
- Hoover Institution
- Hudson Institute
- Independence Institute
- Independent Institute
- Institute for New Economic Thinking
- Institute for Policy Studies
- Institute for Women's Policy Research
- Institute on Religion and Democracy
- Institute on Taxation and Economic Policy
- International Food Policy Research Institute
- James A. Baker III Institute for Public Policy
- James Madison Institute
- John S. Watson Institute for Public Policy
- Joint Center for Political and Economic Studies
- Kansas Policy Institute
- Levy Economics Institute
- Lexington Institute
- Lincoln Institute of Land Policy
- Lugar Center
- Mackinac Center for Public Policy
- Maine Policy Institute
- Manhattan Institute for Policy Research
- MassINC
- McCain Institute
- Mercatus Center at George Mason University
- Migration Policy Institute
- Milken Institute
- Mises Institute
- National Association of Scholars
- National Bureau of Asian Research
- National Bureau of Economic Research
- National Center for Policy Analysis
- National Endowment for Democracy
- National Policy Institute
- New America
- New Democrat Network
- Niskanen Center
- Oklahoma Policy Institute
- Oregon Center for Public Policy
- Pacific Research Institute
- Pembroke Center for Teaching and Research on Women at Brown University
- People's Policy Project
- Peterson Institute for International Economics
- Pew Research Center
- Philadelphia Society
- Pioneer Institute
- Policy Matters Ohio
- Population Research Institute (PRI)
- Potomac Institute for Policy Studies
- Progressive Policy Institute
- Prosperity Now
- Public Citizen
- Public Policy Institute of California
- R Street Institute
- RAND Corporation
- Reason Foundation
- Regional Plan Association
- Ripon Society
- RMI
- Rockefeller Institute of Government
- Rockford Institute
- Rockridge Institute
- Roosevelt Institute
- Seven Pillars Institute
- Show-Me Institute
- Social Science Research Council
- SRI International
- Tax Foundation
- Texas Public Policy Foundation
- The Century Foundation
- The Conference Board
- The Gravel Institute
- The Harkin Institute for Public Policy & Citizen Engagement
- The Heartland Institute
- The Heritage Foundation
- The Independent Institute
- The Reform Institute
- Third Way
- Thomas B. Fordham Institute
- Urban Institute
- W. E. Upjohn Institute for Employment Research
- Washington Policy Center
- World Sindhi Institute

== International relations and security ==
- 38 North
- American Foreign Policy Council
- American Israel Public Affairs Committee
- American Security Council Foundation
- American Security Project
- American–Iranian Council
- Arctic Institute
- Asia Society
- Aspen Institute
- Atlantic Council
- Belfer Center for Science and International Affairs
- Carnegie Council for Ethics in International Affairs
- Carnegie Endowment for International Peace
- Carter Center
- Center on International Cooperation
- Center for a New American Security
- Center for Advanced Defense Studies
- Center for Global Development
- Center for International Development
- Center for International Policy
- Center for International Security and Cooperation
- Center for Naval Analysis
- Center for Security and Emerging Technology
- Center for Security Policy
- Center for Strategic and International Studies
- Center for the National Interest (The Nixon Center)
- Center for Transatlantic Relations
- Center on Global Interests
- Chicago Council on Global Affairs
- Committee on the Present Danger
- Council on Foreign Relations
- Council on Hemispheric Affairs
- Defense Priorities
- East-West Center
- EastWest Institute
- Foreign Policy Research Institute
- Foundation for Defense of Democracies
- Gatestone Institute
- German Marshall Fund of the United States
- Global Trade Watch
- GlobalSecurity.org
- Institute for the Study of War
- Institute for Defense Analyses
- Institute for Indo-Pacific Security
- Institute for Science and International Security
- Inter-American Dialogue
- International Crisis Group
- Islands Society
- Israel Policy Forum
- J Street
- Jewish Institute for National Security Affairs
- Middle East Forum
- Middle East Institute
- National Committee on American Foreign Policy
- National Security Network
- New Lines Institute
- Open Society Foundations
- Pacific Council on International Policy
- Pacific Forum CSIS
- Peterson Institute for International Economics
- Project for the New American Century
- RTI International
- Sikh Coalition
- Special Competitive Studies Project
- Strategic Studies Institute
- Streit Council for a Union of Democracies
- Tellus Institute
- Jamestown Foundation
- The Stimson Center
- Truman National Security Project
- United States Institute of Peace
- Washington Institute for Near East Policy
- Woodrow Wilson International Center for Scholars
- World Affairs Council
- World Resources Institute

== Environment, science and technology ==
- Battelle Memorial Institute
- Center for Climate and Energy Solutions
- Center for Ethical Solutions
- Earth Institute
- Energy Innovation
- Fusion Energy Foundation
- Global Development and Environment Institute
- GTRI Office of Policy Analysis and Research
- Hastings Center
- Information Technology and Innovation Foundation
- Keck Institute for Space Studies
- Metropolitan Area Planning Council
- New England Complex Systems Institute
- Noblis
- Pacific Institute
- Property and Environment Research Center
- Resources for the Future
- RTI International (Research Triangle Institute)
- Santa Fe Institute
- Scripps Research Institute
- Sightline Institute
- Watson Institute at Brown University
- Institute for Progress

== Arts and humanities ==
- Americans for the Arts
- Catholic Family and Human Rights Institute
- Center for Excellence in Higher Education
- Center for Muslim-Jewish Engagement
- Foundation for Excellence in Education
- Foundation for Rational Economics and Education
- International Center for Research on Women
- International Intellectual Property Institute
- New Teacher Center
- Urban Land Institute

== See also ==
- List of think tanks
