= Keith Humphreys =

American psychologist (born 1966)

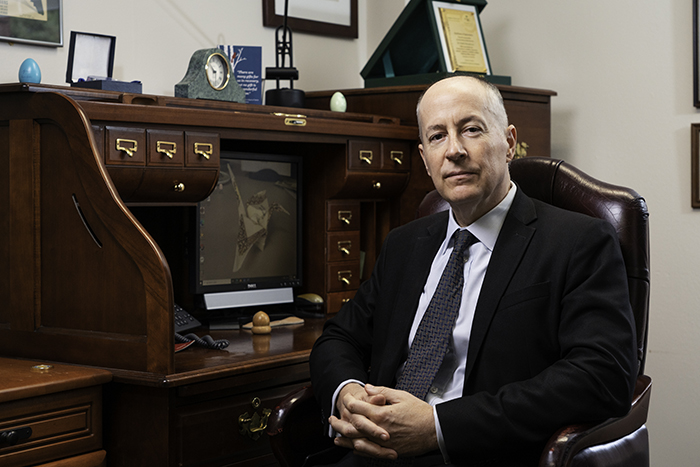
- Professor Keith Humphreys
- Born: 1966 (age 59–60); West Virginia, U.S.
- Education: Michigan State University (B.A.); University of Illinois Urbana-Champaign (A.M., Ph.D.)
- Known for: Research on substance use disorders Alcoholics Anonymous effectiveness Opioid crisis policy
- Awards: Honorary OBE (2022); APA Distinguished Contribution to Public Interest (2009); Freedom of the City of London (2014)
- Scientific career
- Fields: Psychology; Addiction science Health policy
- Workplaces: Stanford University; Veterans Health Administration; King's College London
- Thesis: (1993)
- Website: profiles.stanford.edu/keith-humphreys

Keith Humphreys, OBE (born 1966 in West Virginia) is an American psychologist and the Esther Ting Memorial Professor at Stanford University. He is a senior research career scientist in the Veterans Health Administration and an honorary professor at the Institute of Psychiatry, King's College, London. He serves as deputy editor in chief of the journal Addiction.

== Education ==
Humphreys received his B.A. summa cum laude in psychology from Michigan State University (1988), and his A.M. (1991) and Ph.D. (1993) in clinical and community psychology from the University of Illinois at Urbana-Champaign.

== Academic career ==
Humphreys joined Stanford in 1995 and was appointed to an endowed chair in 2017. He is Section Director for Mental Health Policy in the Department of Psychiatry and Behavioral Sciences and holds courtesy appointments in Health Policy and Stanford Law School. He is affiliated with the Stanford Center for Innovation in Global Health and the Wu Tsai Neurosciences Institute.

His research focuses on the treatment of substance use disorders, mutual-help organizations such as Alcoholics Anonymous, and the translation of addiction research into public policy. According to Google Scholar metrics, he has published over 400 peer-reviewed articles with an h-index of approximately 90 and over 25,000 citations.

== Research ==
Humphreys's scholarship spans addiction treatment, mutual-help organizations, and health policy. His book Circles of Recovery: Self-Help Organizations for Addictions (Cambridge University Press, 2004) synthesized over 500 studies on mutual-help groups for addiction. The Bulletin of the World Health Organization described it as "the first attempt to document the wide variety of self-help organizations for addiction problems found in many parts of the world."

In 2020, Humphreys co-authored a Cochrane systematic review with John Kelly and Marica Ferri examining the effectiveness of Alcoholics Anonymous and Twelve-Step Facilitation programs. The review, which analyzed 27 studies with 10,565 participants, found high-certainty evidence that manualized twelve-step facilitation programs produced higher rates of continuous abstinence compared to other established treatments such as cognitive behavioral therapy.

In 2022, he led the Stanford-Lancet Commission on the North American Opioid Crisis, which published comprehensive policy recommendations in The Lancet.

== Policy work ==
Humphreys has advised on drug and alcohol policy for governments in the United States, United Kingdom, Canada, and internationally. From 2009 to 2010, he took leave from Stanford to serve as Senior Policy Advisor at the White House Office of National Drug Control Policy during the Obama administration, where his responsibilities included designing the national drug strategy and advising on addiction treatment provisions in the Affordable Care Act. He previously served on the White House Commission on Drug-Free Communities during the George W. Bush administration. He has testified before U.S. congressional committees, the British Parliament, and the Canadian Parliament on drug policy issues. In the U.K., he served as a deputy to Professor Dame Carol Black on the Independent Review of Drugs (2019-2021) commissioned by the Home Office and Department of Health. He also served on the Commission on Alcohol Harm chaired by Baroness Ilora Finlay and advised the Greater London Authority on mandatory sobriety programs for alcohol-involved offenders.

Internationally, Humphreys serves on a World Health Organization committee developing guidelines on balanced national policies for controlled medicines. From 2004 to 2009, he volunteered as a consultant to the Iraq Ministry of Health, helping to design and reconstruct Iraq's mental health system following the war.

He co-founded and co-directs the Stanford Network on Addiction Policy, which connects addiction researchers with policymakers, and leads the Stanford-Lancet Commission on the North American Opioid Crisis.

== Public writing ==
Humphreys writes on addiction and drug policy for general audiences. He has contributed approximately 100 articles to The Washington Post and has published in The New York Times, The Wall Street Journal, Foreign Affairs, The Atlantic, The Guardian, and other outlets.

His book Addiction: A Very Short Introduction was published by Oxford University Press in 2023.

== Honors and awards ==
- Honorary Officer of the Order of the British Empire (2022), for service to addiction science and policy in Britain
- VA Under Secretary's Award for Outstanding Achievement in Health Services Research (2021)
- Freedom of the City of London (2014)
- British Medical Association Public Health Book of the Year (2010), as co-author of Drug Policy and the Public Good
- American Psychological Association Award for Distinguished Contribution to the Public Interest (2009), for work on rebuilding Iraq's psychiatric care system and redesigning VA mental health services
- American Psychological Association Distinguished Scientific Early Career Contribution to Addiction Research (2003)
- Fellow, American Psychological Association (2001)

== Books ==
- Humphreys, K. (2023). Addiction: A Very Short Introduction. Oxford University Press.
- Humphreys, K., & Lingford-Hughes, A. (2016). Edwards' Treatment of Drinking Problems (6th ed.). Cambridge University Press.
- Babor, T. F., et al. (2010, 2018). Drug Policy and the Public Good (1st & 2nd eds.). Oxford University Press.
- Humphreys, K. (2004). Circles of Recovery: Self-Help Organizations for Addictions. Cambridge University Press.

== Selected recent publications ==
- Humphreys, K. (2018). How Medicaid can strengthen the national response to the opioid epidemic. American Journal of Public Health, 108, 589–590.
- Humphreys, K., Felbab-Brown, V., & Caulkins, J. (2018). Opioids of the masses: Stopping an American epidemic from going global. Foreign Affairs, May/June, 118–129.
- Lembke, A., Papac, J., & Humphreys, K. (2018). Our other prescription drug problem. New England Journal of Medicine, 378, 693–695.
- Humphreys, K. (2017). Avoiding globalisation of the prescription opioid epidemic. Lancet, 390, 437–439.
- Humphreys, K., Malenka, R., Knutson, B., & MacCoun, R. (2017). Brains, environments and policy responses to addiction. Science, 356, 1237–1238.
- Friedmann, P.D., Andrews, C.M., & Humphreys, K. (2017). How repealing the Affordable Care Act would worsen the opioid epidemic. New England Journal of Medicine, 376. DOI: 10.1056/NEJMp1700834
