= Liaison officer =

Coordinator and communicator between organizations

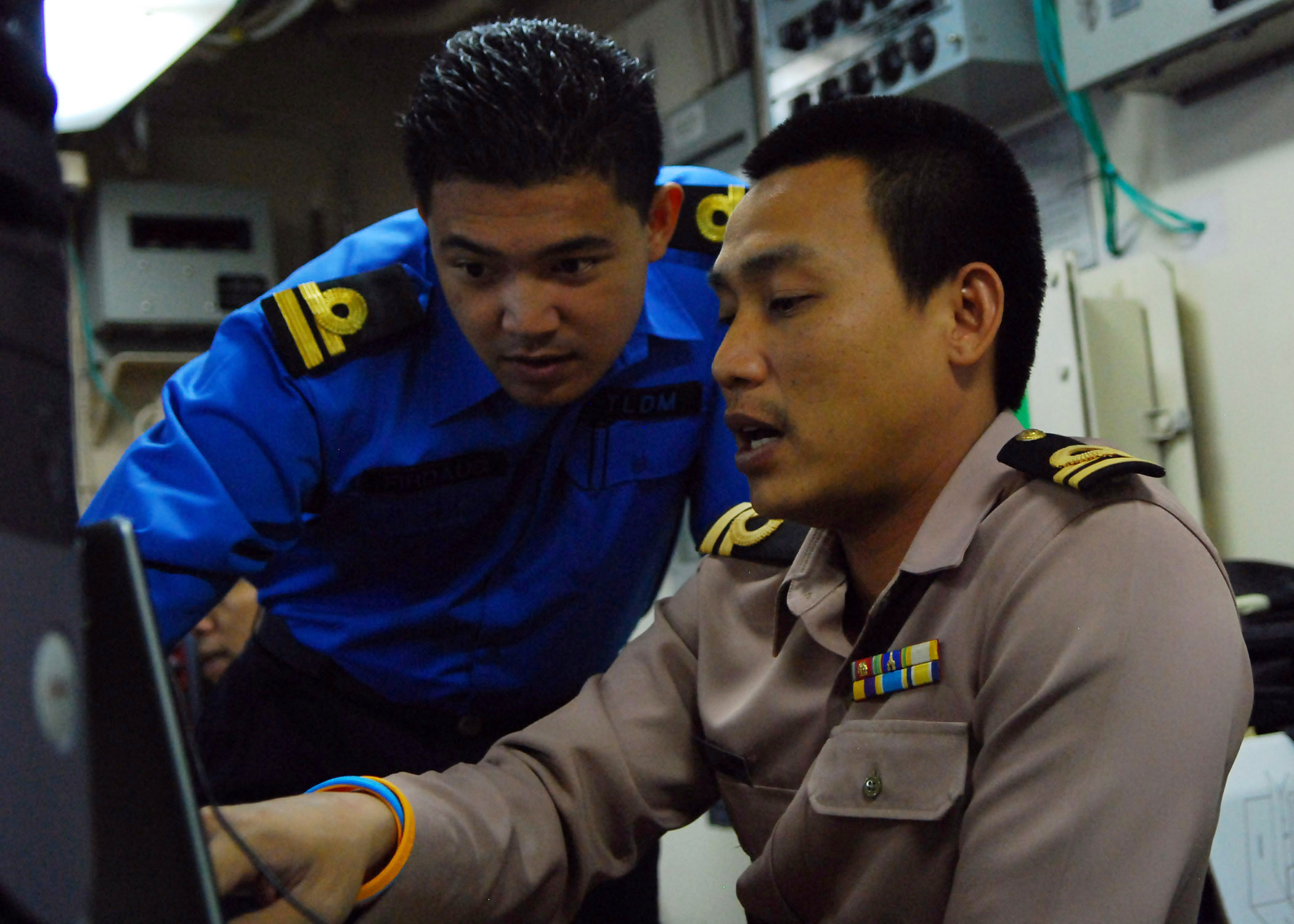
Naval liaison officers from Malaysia and Thailand coordinate efforts

A liaison officer is a person who liaises between two or more organizations to communicate and coordinate their activities on a matter of mutual concern. Generally, liaison officers are used for achieving the best utilization of resources, or employment of services of one organization by another. Liaison officers often provide technical or subject matter expertise of their parent organization. Usually, an organization embeds or attaches a liaison officer into another organization to provide face-to-face coordination.

== Military Liaison Officers (MLO) ==
In the military, liaison officers may coordinate activities to protect units from collateral damage. They also work to achieve mutual understanding or unity of effort among disparate groups. For incidence or disaster management, liaison officers serve as the primary contact for agencies responding to the situation.

== Expedition Liaison Officers (ELO) ==
Many countries that are regularly visited by mountaineering expeditions from overseas, whose team members intend to climb at high altitudes, require that each expedition has an officially designated Liaison officer. The role of the ELO involves assisting the expedition, by managing interactions between the expedition members and the local populace and ensuring that porters, sirdars and other local people working for the expedition do their jobs effectively. In some areas the ELO's role would also involve monitoring the expedition from a security point of view. Because of the 'security' role it was normal that ELOs were military officers although in later years civilian ELOs have been appointed by some nations and some countries now designate 'open areas' in which foreign expeditions can operate without a designated ELO.

== Community Liaison Officers (CLO) ==
In the foreign service, community liaison officers support employees and family members who are assigned to foreign embassies. In the United States foreign service, they are charged with building community spirit and enhancing morale at post. Currently, CLOs operate at over 200 U.S. missions worldwide, including several unaccompanied posts such as Baghdad, Kabul, and Islamabad.

=== Challenges ===
Since one of the primary tasks of a liaison officer is often to coordinate activities between two or more organizations, people in these positions typically need to possess strong language and communication skills. This presents a challenge in the case of CLOs, who are posted to missions in their capacity as a spouse. Many have therefore not received the necessary training in order to be proficient in the local language prior to being posted overseas. According to some commentators, this makes it difficult for many CLOs to be effective at their jobs. In his words, Eddie Walsh argues, "Unfortunately, it is hard to understand how CLO Coordinators can effectively liaise with the local community to provide 'programming, information, resources, and referrals' about off-post activities and on-the-economy services when they are not required to be fluent in the local language." Others disagree. For example, George Wilcox counters, "In the 1990s my wife served twice as CLO, once in Central Asia, where she didn't speak the language and once in Brazil, where she did. She did an excellent job in both places, mostly because of her empathy for family members and her proactive involvement in helping them to adjust successfully to life in the two countries."

== Supporter Liaison Officers (SLOs) ==
A supporter liaison officer is a person within an association football club (or another sports club) functioning as a bridge between the club itself and supporters of the club. The SLO builds relations with the club management and the fans through two-way communication, informing supporters about decisions made by the club and informing the club about the fan's point of view. The SLO also works with security and police as well as the SLOs of other clubs to ensure that relevant knowledge is spread to all organisations participating in matches and other events of the club.
