= Will McCants =

American Islamic scholar (born 1975)

William McCants
- Born: 1975 (age 50–51)
- Other name: William Faizi McCants

Academic background
- Education: Princeton University
- Doctoral advisor: Michael Cook
- Website: http://www.jihadica.com/

Will McCants (born 1975), also known as William Faizi McCants, is a scholar of militant Islamism. He is a fellow at the Center for Middle East Policy and director of the Project on U.S. Relations with the Islamic World at the Brookings Institution. An adjunct faculty member at Johns Hopkins University, he is a former senior advisor on violent extremism to the U.S. State Department's Office of the Coordinator for Counterterrorism. Founder and co-editor of the website Jihadica, he is also a former research analyst for CNA, a non-profit organization that encompasses the Center for Naval Analyses and the Institute for Public Research.

== Career ==
Described by William Maclean, the security correspondent for Reuters, as "a leading scholar of militant Islamism", McCants is author of a 2011 book titled Founding Gods, Inventing Nations: Conquest and Culture Myths from Antiquity to Islam, based on his doctoral research at Princeton University.

McCants is co-editor of Jihadica.com, which The Economist described as "a respected website".

== Books ==
- McCants, William (2012). Founding gods, inventing nations: Conquest and culture myths from antiquity to Islam. Princeton: Princeton University Press. ISBN 978-0-691-15148-9. OCLC 757398573.
- McCants, William (2015). The ISIS apocalypse: The history, strategy, and doomsday vision of the Islamic State. New York: St. Martin's Press. ISBN 978-1-250-08090-5. OCLC 904081714.
- McCants, William (2015). The believer: How an introvert with a passion for religion and soccer became Abu Bakr al-Baghdadi, leader of the Islamic State. Washington, DC: The Brookings Institution. ISBN 978-0-8157-2859-7. OCLC 920465986.
- Hamid, Shadi; McCants, William, eds. (2017). Rethinking political Islam. New York, NY, United States of America: Oxford University Press. ISBN 978-0-19-064919-7. OCLC 960276884.
