= OCPP =

OCPP may refer to:

- Oregon Center for Public Policy, an Oregonian economic research organization
- Open Charge Point Protocol, open protocol for managing networked electric vehicle charging stations
