= Paul Kengor =

American writer and academic

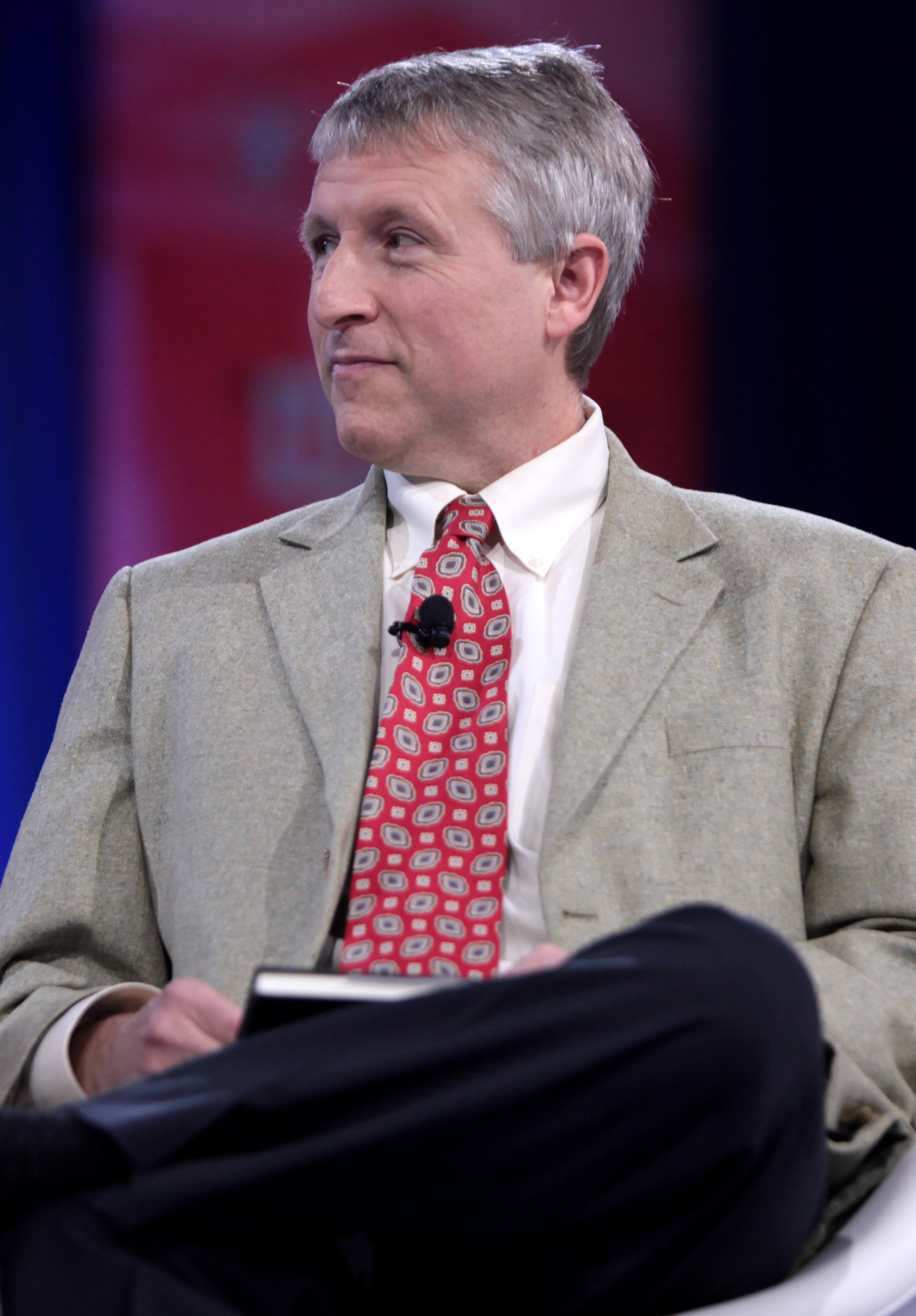
- Kengor in 2016
- Born: Paul G. Kengor; December 6, 1966 (age 59); Pittsburgh, Pennsylvania, U.S.
- Spouse: Susan Kengor
- Children: 8

Academic background
- Education: University of Pittsburgh (BA, PhD); The American University (MA)

Academic work
- Discipline: Political science
- Institutions: Grove City College

Paul G. Kengor (born December 6, 1966) is an American author and professor of political science at Grove City College and the senior director of the Institute for Faith and Freedom, a Grove City College think tank. He is a visiting fellow at Stanford University's Hoover Institution on War, Revolution, and Peace. Kengor has focused much of his work on Ronald Reagan, faith and the presidency, conservative politics, the Cold War, Communism, and Catholicism.

== Education ==
Initially seeking a medical career, Kengor majored in biochemistry/biophysics at the University of Pittsburgh where he worked for Thomas Starzl's organ-transplant team, the pioneer of organ transplantation. After receiving his bachelor's degree, his interest in the end of the Cold War and politics motivated him to pursue political science instead of medicine. He received his master's degree from the American University School of International Service and his doctorate degree from the University of Pittsburgh Graduate School of Public and International Affairs. He also holds an honorary doctorate from the Franciscan University in Steubenville, Ohio.

== Career ==
Kengor has done work for the Center for Strategic and International Studies, The Heritage Foundation and Allegheny Institute for Public Policy, conservative think tanks. He has served on the editorial board of Presidential Studies Quarterly. He does a regular commentary for American Radio Journal, Moody Broadcasting, and Ave Maria Radio Network/CatholicExchange.com. He also writes for the American Spectator. In September 2022, R. Emmett Tyrrell Jr., the founder of The American Spectator, announced that Kengor will be succeeding him as editor in chief of the magazine. Tyrrell remains editor in chief while Kengor serves as editor of the magazine.

Kengor has published eight books on Ronald Reagan. The 2024 film Reagan, starring Dennis Quaid as Reagan, is based on Kengor's 2006 book The Crusader: Ronald Reagan and the Fall of Communism.

== Personal life ==
He has eight children, including two adopted children, with his wife Susan.

== Writings ==
- Wreath Layer or Policy Player? Lexington Books, 2002. ISBN 978-0-73-910174-2
- The Reagan Presidency: Assessing the Man and His Legacy, with Peter Schweizer, et al. Rowman & Littlefield Publishers, 2005 ISBN 978-0-74-253415-5
- God and Ronald Reagan: A Spiritual Life. Harper Perennial, 2005. ISBN 978-0-06-057142-9
- God and George W. Bush: A Spiritual Life. Harper Perennial, 2005. ISBN 978-0-06-077956-6
- The Crusader: Ronald Reagan and the Fall of Communism. New York: Regan Books, 2006. ISBN 978-0-06-113690-0
- The Judge: William P. Clark, Ronald Reagan's Top Hand. with Patricia Clark Doerner. Ft. Collins, CO: Ignatius Press, 2007. ISBN 1-58617-183-6
- God and Hillary Clinton: A Spiritual Life. New York: Harper, 2007. ISBN 978-0-06-113692-4
- Dupes: How America's Adversaries Have Manipulated Progressives for a Century. Wilmington, Del: ISI Books, 2010. ISBN 978-1-935191-75-9
- The Communist: Frank Marshall Davis: The Untold Story of Barack Obama's Mentor. Mercury Radio Arts Publishing, 2012. ISBN 978-1451698091
- All the Dupes Fit to Print: Journalists Who Have Served as Tools of Communist Propaganda, with Cliff Kincaid. CreateSpace Independent Publishing Platform, 2013. ISBN 978-1-49-230010-6
- 11 Principles of a Reagan Conservative. Beaufort Books, 2014. ISBN 978-0-82-530699-0
- Reagan's Legacy in a World Transformed, with Jeffrey L. Chidester, et al. Harvard University Press, 2015. ISBN 978-0-67-496769-4
- Takedown: From Communists to Progressives, How the Left Has Sabotaged Family and Marriage. WND Books, 2015. ISBN 978-1-94-247510-1
- A Pope and A President: John Paul II, Ronald Reagan, and the Extraordinary Untold Story of the 20th Century. ISI Books, 2017. ISBN 978-1-61-017143-4
- The Politically Incorrect Guide to Communism. Regnery Publishing, 2017. ISBN 978-1-62-157587-0
- The Divine Plan: Reagan, John Paul II and the Dramatic End of the Cold War. With Robert Orlando. ISI Books, 2019. ISBN 978-1-61017-154-0
- The Devil and Karl Marx: Communism's Long March of Death, Deception, and Infiltration. TAN Books, 2020. ISBN 1505114446
- The Devil and Bella Dodd: One Woman's Struggle Against Communism and Her Redemption, with Mary Nicholas. TAN Books, 2022. ISBN 1505129184
- American Pontiff: Pope Leo XIV and His Plan to Heal the Church. Humanix Books, 2026. ISBN 978-1-63-006331-3
