= Shadi Hamid =

American writer (born 1983)

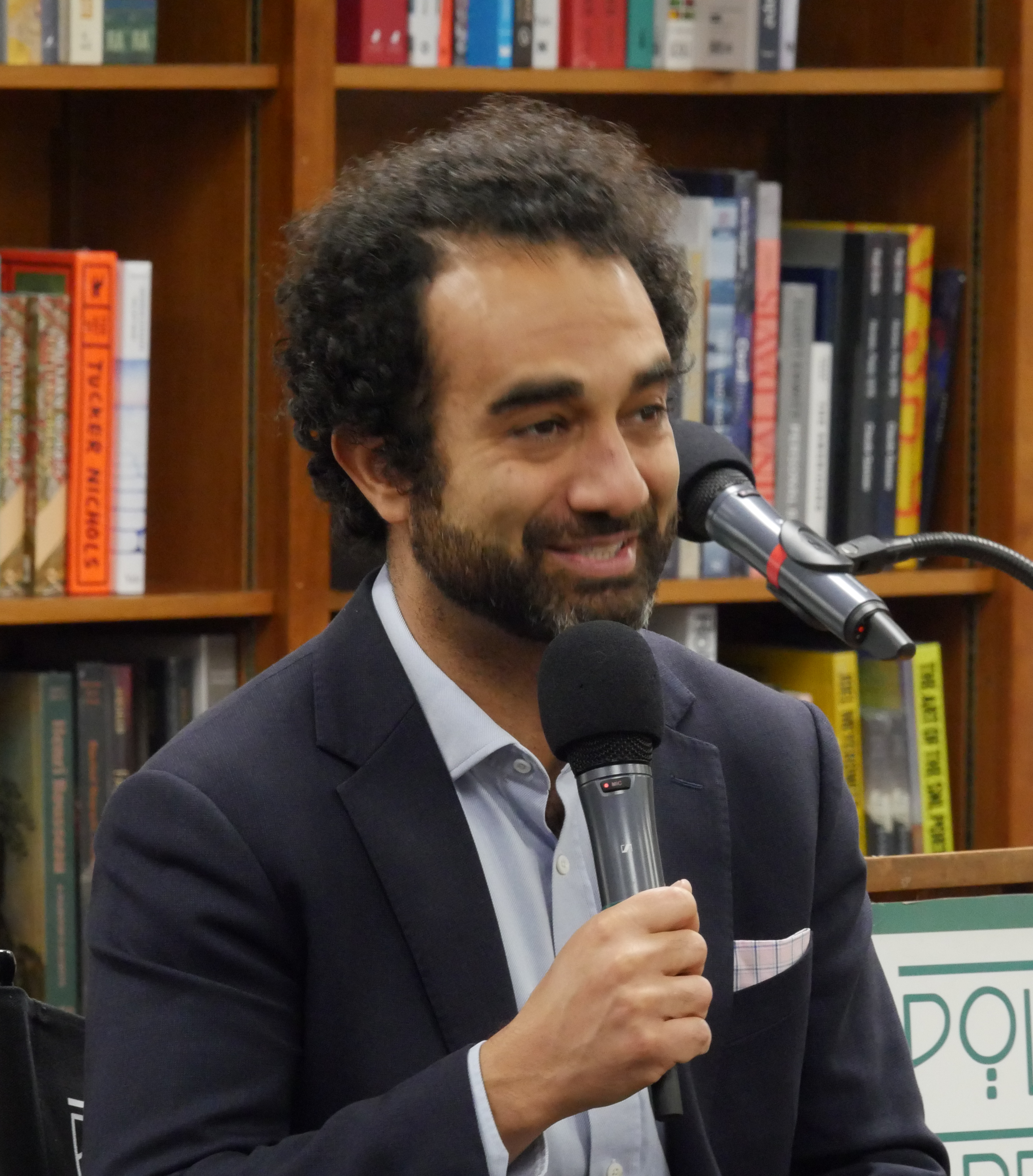
Hamid

Shadi Hamid (born September 22, 1983) is an American author and political scientist working as a columnist at The Washington Post. Previously, he worked at Brookings Institution and at The Atlantic. He is also the author of several books about political Islam and democracy in the Middle East, which earned him recognition. Hamid is the first Muslim scholar hired by Fuller Theological Seminary, where he is research professor of Islamic studies.

== Early life and education ==
Hamid was born in Pennsylvania to an Egyptian family. A Marshall Scholar, Hamid completed his doctoral degree in politics at Oxford University in 2010. His dissertation was titled "Democrats without Democracy: The Unlikely Moderation of the Muslim Brotherhood in Egypt and Jordan". Hamid received his B.S. and M.A. from Georgetown University's School of Foreign Service.

== Career ==
From 2004 to 2005, Hamid was a Fulbright Fellow in Jordan, researching Islamist participation in the democratic process. Subsequently, he was a research fellow at the American Center for Oriental Research in Amman, where he conducted research on the relationship between the Muslim Brotherhood and the Jordanian government. From 2008 to 2009, he was a Hewlett Fellow at Stanford University's Center on Democracy, Development and the Rule of Law. Until 2014, Hamid was a senior fellow in the Center for Middle East Policy in the Foreign Policy program at the Brookings Institution. He was also a contributing writer at The Atlantic.

In 2014, Hamid wrote Temptations of Power, where he discussed Islam and democracy. Temptations of Power was named a Foreign Affairs "Best Book of 2014". This was followed by Islamic Exceptionalism (2016), where he described Islam's resistance to secularization and outsized role in public life. "Islamic exceptionalism", a term he coined, attracted some criticism. Islamic Exceptionalism was shortlisted for the 2017 Lionel Gelber Prize. In subsequent years, he wrote Rethinking Political Islam (2017), Militants, Criminals and Warlords (2018), The Problem of Democracy (2022), and The Case for American Power. (2025).

Hamid has written for several publications, including Foreign Affairs, Foreign Policy, The National Interest, The New York Times, The Washington Post, and The Wall Street Journal. He also appeared as a guest on CNN's The Situation Room with Wolf Blitzer and The Lead with Jake Tapper, Fox News, The Megyn Kelly Show, MSNBC's Morning Joe, NBC Nightly News, and PBS Newshour. In 2019, Hamid was recognized as a "prominent thinker on religion and politics" by The New York Times, and was named as one of "The world's top 50 thinkers" by Prospect, with "an emphasis on democratic institutions and the importance of due process". Also in 2019, he started the Wisdom of Crowds, an ideas collective and debate platform with Hamid serving as a co-host.

On January 24, 2022, it was announced that he was to take the position of research professor of Islamic studies at Fuller Theological Seminary. This appointment made him the first Muslim scholar in the school's 75-year history. From 2023 to 2024, he was a member of the Editorial Board of The Washington Post, working as a columnist with a focus on culture, religion, and foreign policy.

== Books ==
- Hamid, Shadi (2014). Temptations of Power: Islamists and Illiberal Democracy in a New Middle East. New York: OUP USA. ISBN 978-0-19-931405-8. OCLC 870994390.
- Hamid, Shadi (2016). Islamic Exceptionalism: How the Struggle Over Islam Is Reshaping the World. New York: St. Martin's Press. ISBN 978-1-250-06101-0. OCLC 933446666.
- Hamid, Shadi; McCants, William, eds. (2017). Rethinking Political Islam. New York: Oxford University Press. ISBN 978-0-19-064919-7. OCLC 960276884.
- Hamid, Shadi; Felbab-Brown, Vanda; Trinkunas, Harold (2017). Militants, Criminals and Warlords: The Challenge of Local Governance in an Age of Disorder. Washington, D.C.: Brookings Institution Press. ISBN 978-0-8157-3189-4. OCLC 1008771146.
- Hamid, Shadi (2022). The Problem of Democracy: America, the Middle East, and The Rise and Fall of an Idea. New York: Oxford University Press. ISBN 978-0-19-757946-6.
- Hamid, Shadi (2025). The Case for American Power. New York: Simon & Schuster. ISBN 978-1-6680-3188-9.
