= Brookings Institution =

American think tank

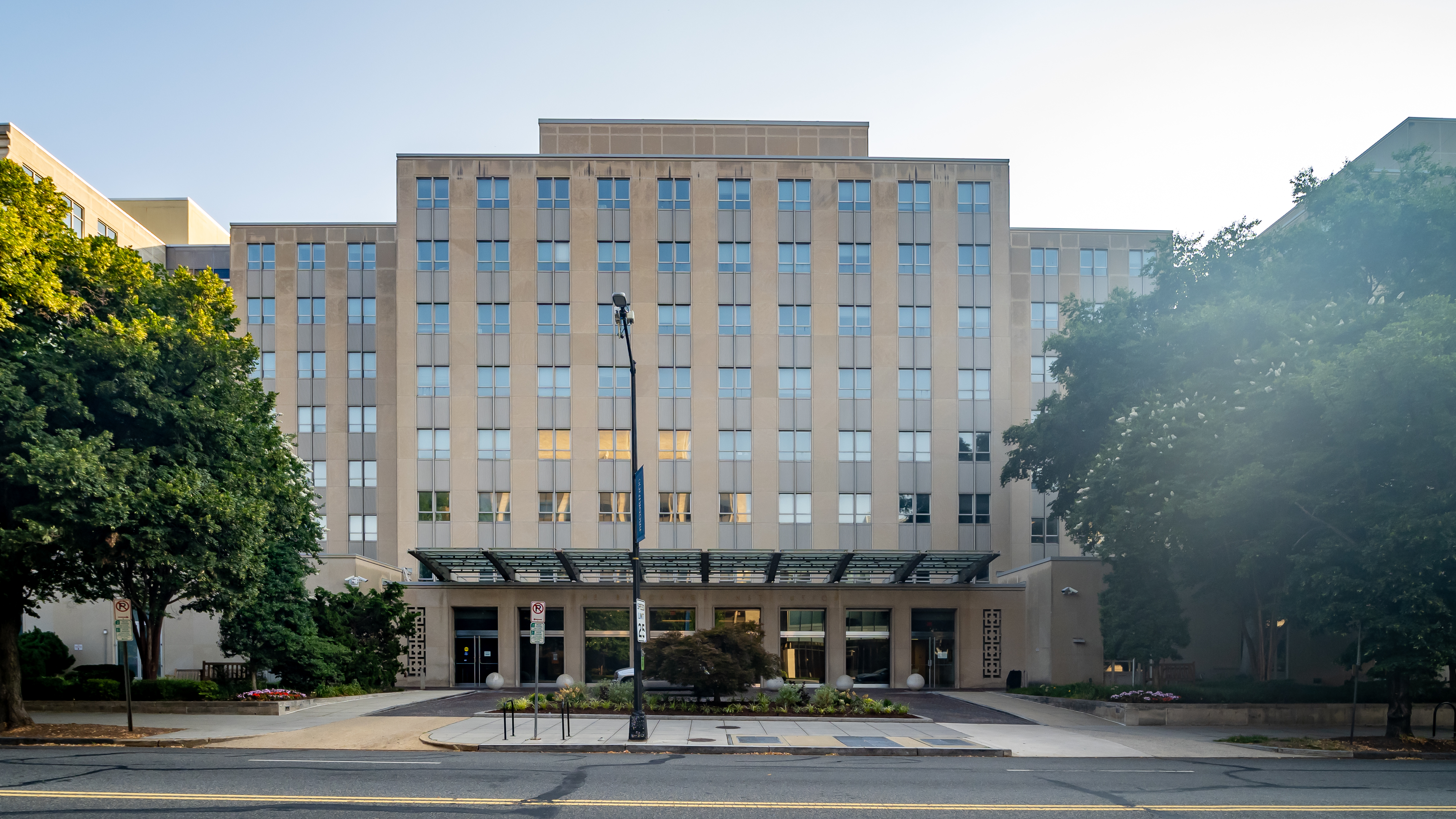
- Brookings Institution building near Dupont Circle in Washington, D.C.
- Abbreviation: Brookings
- Formation: 1916; 110 years ago
- Founder: Robert S. Brookings
- Type: Public policy think tank
- Tax ID no.: 53-0196577
- Headquarters: 1775 Massachusetts Avenue, N.W.
- Location: Washington, D.C., U.S.
- Coordinates: 38°54′33″N 77°02′27″W
- President: Cecilia Rouse
- Revenue: $105.9 million (2025)
- Expenses: $105.2 million (2025)
- Endowment: $466.6 million (2025)
- Website: brookings.edu
- Formerly called: Institute for Government Research

The Brookings Institution, often stylized as Brookings, is an American think tank in Washington, D.C. The institution conducts research and education in the social sciences, primarily in economics and tax policy, metropolitan policy, governance, foreign policy, global economy, and economic development.

Brookings states that its staff "represent diverse points of view" and describes itself as nonpartisan. Media outlets have variously described Brookings as centrist, conservative, liberal, center-right, and center-left. An academic analysis of congressional records from 1993 to 2002 found that Brookings was cited by conservative politicians almost as often as by liberal politicians, earning a score of 53 on a 1–100 scale (with 100 representing the most liberal score). The same study found Brookings to be the most frequently cited think tank by U.S. media and politicians.

The University of Pennsylvania's Global Go To Think Tank Index Report named Brookings "Think Tank of the Year – Top Think Tank in the World" every year from its first edition in 2008 through 2015, and again from 2017 through its last edition in 2020. As of 2025, Brookings is the most cited think tank in the world.

== History ==
=== 20th century ===
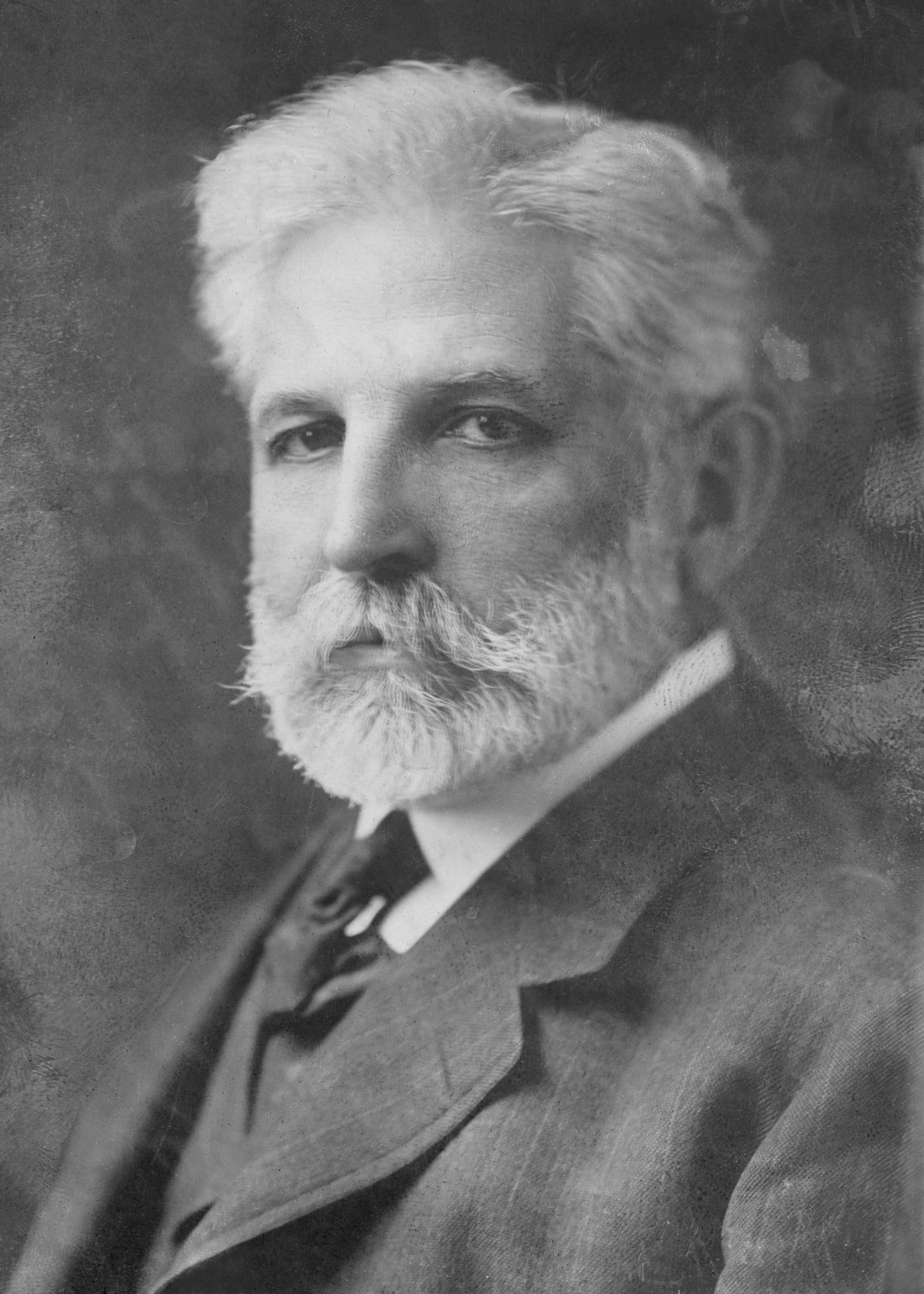
Robert S. Brookings, who founded the Brookings Institution in 1916

Brookings was founded in 1916 as the Institute for Government Research (IGR), with the mission of becoming "the first private organization devoted to analyzing public policy issues at the national level." The organization was founded on March 13, 1916, and began operations on October 1, 1916. Its stated mission is to "provide innovative and practical recommendations that advance three broad goals: strengthen American democracy; foster the economic and social welfare, security, and opportunity of all Americans; and secure a more open, safe, prosperous, and cooperative international system."

The Institution's founder, philanthropist Robert S. Brookings (1850–1932), originally created three organizations: the Institute for Government Research, the Institute of Economics with funds from the Carnegie Corporation, and the Robert Brookings Graduate School affiliated with Washington University in St. Louis. The three were merged into the Brookings Institution on December 8, 1927. During the Great Depression in the United States, economists at Brookings embarked on a large-scale study commissioned by President Franklin D. Roosevelt to understand its underlying causes. Brookings's first president, Harold G. Moulton, and other Brookings scholars later led an effort to oppose Roosevelt's National Recovery Administration because they thought it impeded economic recovery.

With the U.S. entry into World War II in 1941, Brookings researchers turned their attention to aiding the administration with a series of studies on mobilization. In 1948, Brookings was asked to submit a plan for administering the European Recovery Program. The resulting organization scheme assured that the Marshall Plan was run carefully and on a businesslike basis. In 1952, Robert Calkins succeeded Moulton as Brookings's president. He secured grants from the Rockefeller Foundation and the Ford Foundation and reorganized Brookings around the Economic Studies, Government Studies, and Foreign Policy Programs. In 1957, Brookings moved from Jackson Avenue to a new research center near Dupont Circle in Washington, D.C.

In 1967, Kermit Gordon assumed Brookings's presidency. He began a series of studies of program choices for the federal budget in 1969 titled "Setting National Priorities". He also expanded the Foreign Policy Studies Program to include research about national security and defense. After Richard Nixon was elected president in the 1968 United States presidential election, the relationship between Brookings and the White House deteriorated. At one point, Nixon aide Charles Colson proposed a firebombing of the institution. G. Gordon Liddy and the White House Plumbers actually made a plan to firebomb the headquarters and steal classified files, but it was canceled because the Nixon administration refused to pay for a fire engine as a getaway vehicle. Yet throughout the 1970s, Brookings was offered more federal research contracts than it could handle.

In 1976, after Gordon died, Gilbert Y. Steiner, director of the governmental studies program, was appointed the fourth president of the Brookings Institution by the board of trustees. As director of the governmental studies program, Steiner brought in numerous scholars whose research ranges from administrative reform to urban policy, not only enhancing the program's visibility and influence in Washington and nationally, but also producing works that have arguably survived as classics in the field of political science.

By the 1980s, Brookings faced an increasingly competitive and ideologically charged intellectual environment. The need to reduce the federal budget deficit became a major research theme, as did problems with national security and government inefficiency. Bruce MacLaury, Brookings's fifth president, also established the Center for Public Policy Education to develop workshop conferences and public forums to broaden the audience for research programs. An academic analysis of congressional records from 1993 to 2002 found that Brookings was cited by conservative politicians almost as often as by liberal politicians, earning a score of 53 on a 1–100 scale, with 100 representing the most liberal score. The same study found Brookings to be the most frequently cited think tank by U.S. media and politicians.

In 1995, Michael Armacost became the sixth president of the Brookings Institution and led an effort to refocus its mission heading into the 21st century. Under his direction, Brookings created several interdisciplinary research centers, such as the Center on Urban and Metropolitan Policy, now the Metropolitan Policy Program led by Bruce J. Katz, which brought attention to the strengths of cities and metropolitan areas; and the Center for Northeast Asian Policy Studies, which brings together specialists from different Asian countries to examine regional problems.

=== 21st century ===
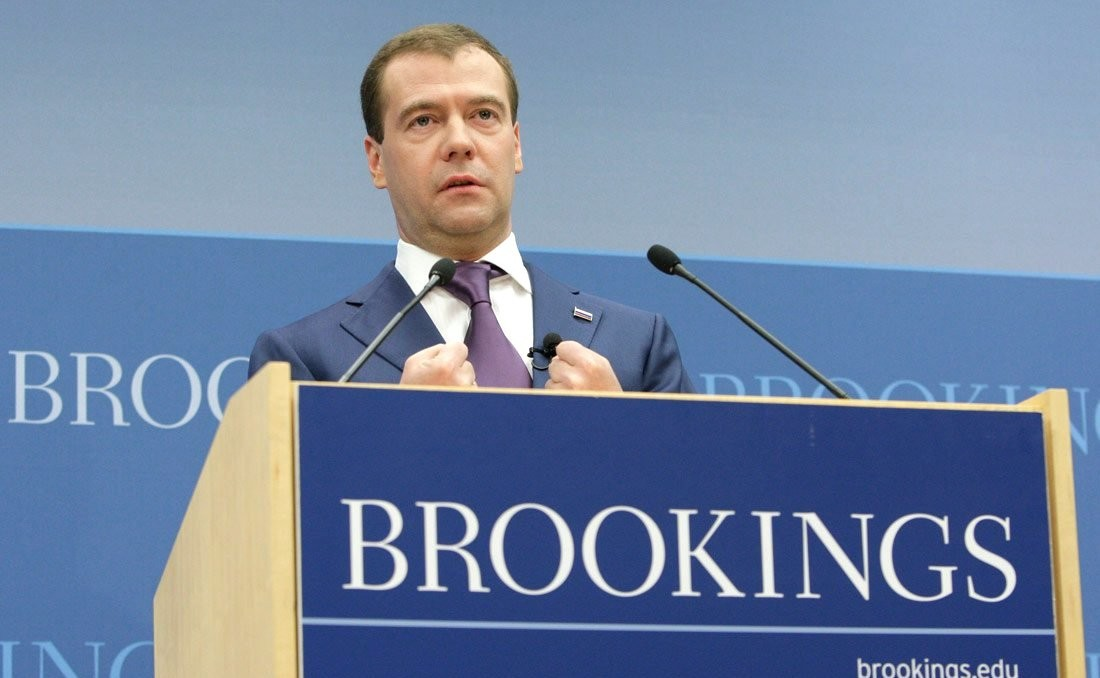
Former Russian President Dmitry Medvedev speaking at the Brookings Institution in April 2010

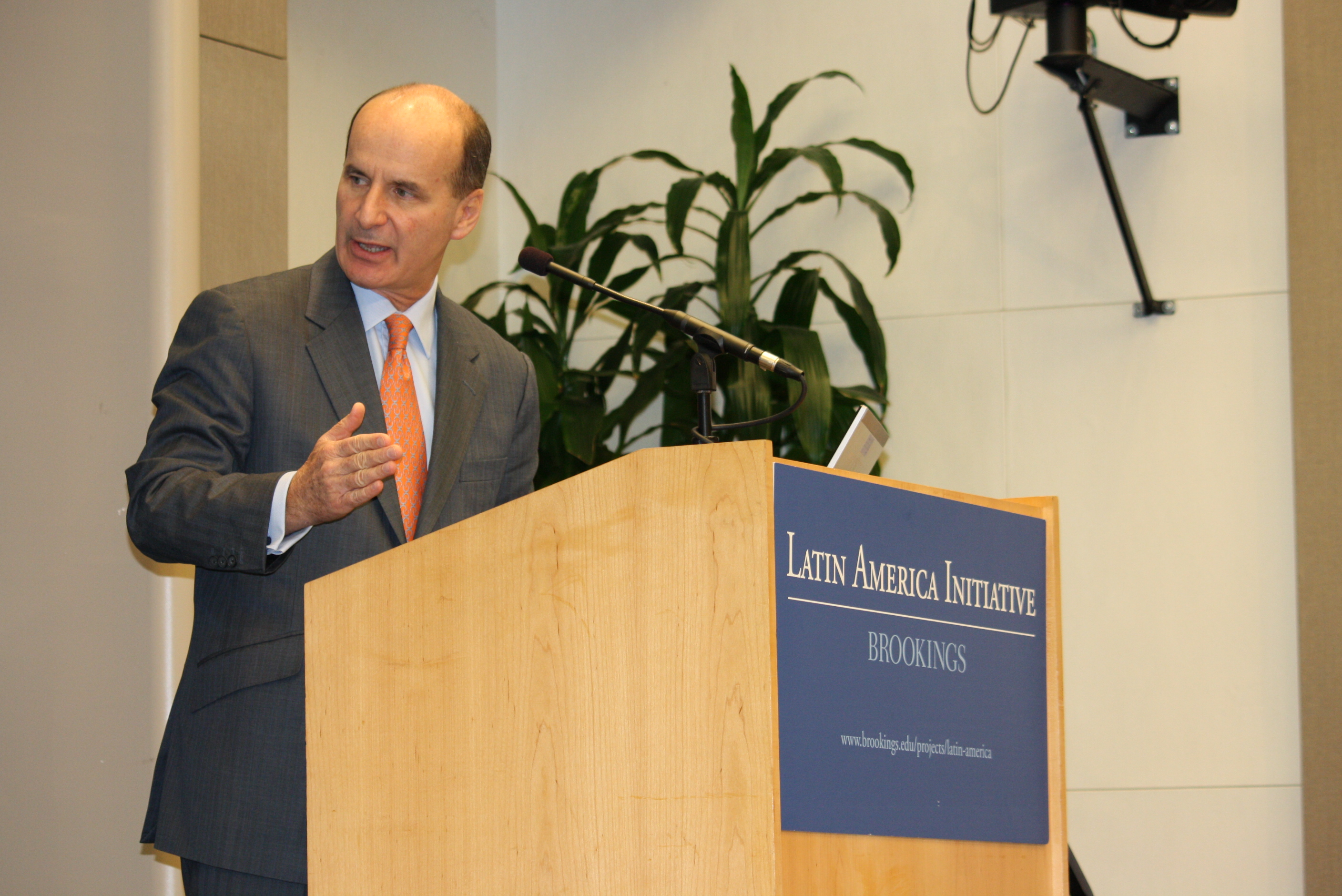
José María Figueres, former president of Costa Rica, speaking at Brookings Institution in March 2012

In 2002, Strobe Talbott became president of Brookings. Shortly thereafter, Brookings launched the Saban Center for Middle East Policy and the John L. Thornton China Center. In 2006, Brookings announced the establishment of the Brookings-Tsinghua Center in Beijing. In July 2007, Brookings announced the creation of the Engelberg Center for Health Care Reform to be directed by senior fellow Mark McClellan, and in October 2007 the creation of the Brookings Doha Center directed by fellow Hady Amr in Qatar. During this period, the funding of Brookings by foreign governments and corporations came under public scrutiny. In 2011, Talbott inaugurated the Brookings India Office.

In October 2017, former general John R. Allen became the eighth president of Brookings. Allen resigned on June 12, 2022, amid an FBI foreign lobbying investigation. As of June 30, 2019, Brookings had an endowment of $377.2 million. Brookings operated three international centers: in Doha, Qatar (Brookings Doha Center); Beijing, China (Brookings-Tsinghua Center for Public Policy); and New Delhi, India (Brookings India). In 2020 and 2021, the Institution announced it was separating entirely from its centers in Doha and New Delhi, and transitioning its center in Beijing to an informal partnership with Tsinghua University, known as Brookings-Tsinghua China.

== Publications ==
Brookings as an institution produces an Annual Report. The Brookings Institution Press publishes books and journals from the institution's own research as well as authors outside the organization. The books and journals it publishes include Brookings Papers on Economic Activity, Brookings Review (1982–2003, ISSN 0745-1253), America Unbound: The Bush Revolution in Foreign Policy, Globalphobia: Confronting Fears about Open Trade, India: Emerging Power, Through Their Eyes, Taking the High Road, Masses in Flight, US Public Policy Regarding Sovereign Wealth Fund Investment in the United States and Stalemate. In addition, books, papers, articles, reports, policy briefs and opinion pieces are produced by Brookings research programs, centers, projects and, for the most part, by experts. Brookings also cooperates with The Lawfare Institute in publishing the online multimedia publication Lawfare.

== Policy influence ==
Brookings traces its history to 1916 and has contributed to the creation of the United Nations, the Marshall Plan, and the Congressional Budget Office, as well as to the development of influential policies for deregulation, broad-based tax reform, welfare reform, and foreign aid. The annual think tank index published by Foreign Policy ranks it the number one think tank in the U.S. and the Global Go To Think Tank Index believes it is the number one such tank in the world. Moreover, in spite of an overall decline in the number of times information or opinions developed by think tanks are cited by U.S. media, of the 200 most prominent think tanks in the U.S., the Brookings Institution's research remains the most frequently cited.

In a 1997 survey of congressional staff and journalists, Brookings ranked as the most influential and first in credibility among 27 think tanks considered. Yet "Brookings and its researchers are not so concerned, in their work, in affecting the ideological direction of the nation" and rather tend "to be staffed by researchers with strong academic credentials". Along with the Council on Foreign Relations and Carnegie Endowment for International Peace, Brookings is generally considered one of the most influential policy institutes in the U.S.

== Political stance ==
As a 501(c)(3) nonprofit organization, Brookings describes itself as independent and nonpartisan. A 2005 UCLA study concluded it was "centrist" because it was referenced as an authority almost equally by both conservative and liberal politicians in congressional records from 1993 to 2002. The New York Times has called Brookings liberal, liberal-centrist, and centrist. The Washington Post has called Brookings centrist, liberal, and center-left. The Los Angeles Times called Brookings liberal-leaning and centrist while noting that it didn't believe such labels mattered.

In 1977, Time magazine called Brookings the "nation's pre-eminent liberal think tank". Newsweek has called it centrist, and Politico has used the term "center-left". The progressive, left-leaning media watchdog group Fairness and Accuracy in Reporting has called Brookings "centrist", "conservative", and "center-right". Matthew Yglesias, a former writer and editor at The Atlantic, and Glenn Greenwald at Salon have argued that Brookings foreign policy scholars were overly supportive of Bush administration policies abroad. Citing Greenwald, FAIR questioned whether Brookings should be considered right-wing "extremist" instead of "a 'liberal' think tank".

Brookings scholars have served in Republican and Democratic administrations, including Mark McClellan, Ron Haskins, and Martin Indyk. Brookings's board of trustees is composed of 53 trustees and more than three dozen honorary trustees, including Kenneth Duberstein, a former chief of staff to Ronald Reagan. Aside from political figures, the board of trustees includes leaders in business and industry, including Haim Saban, Robert Bass, Hanzade Doğan Boyner, Paul L. Cejas, W. Edmund Clark, Abby Joseph Cohen, Betsy Cohen, Susan Crown, Arthur B. Culvahouse Jr., Jason Cummins, Paul Desmarais Jr., Kenneth M. Duberstein, Glenn Hutchins, and Philip H. Knight (chairman emeritus of Nike, Inc).

== Presidents ==
Since its incorporation as the Brookings Institution in 1927, it has been led by accomplished academics and public servants. Brookings has had eleven presidents, including three in acting capacity. The current president is Cecilia Rouse, who replaced acting President Amy Liu, who began serving in January 2024.

- Harold G. Moulton, 1927–1952
- Robert D. Calkins, 1952–1967
- Kermit Gordon, 1967–1976
- Gilbert Y. Steiner (acting), 1976–1977
- Bruce K. MacLaury, 1977–1995
- Michael Armacost, 1995–2002
- Strobe Talbott, 2002–2017
- John R. Allen, 2017–2022
- Ted Gayer (acting), 2022–2022
- Amy Liu (acting), 2022–2023
- Cecilia Rouse, 2024–present

== Staff ==
Brookings staff's union, Brookings United, was formed in 2021. It is affiliated with the Nonprofit Professional Employees Union (NPEU), a local of the International Federation of Professional and Technical Engineers. In 2024, the ratification of a 3-year collective bargaining agreement (CBA) was reached.

== Research programs ==
=== Center for Middle East Policy ===
In 2002, the Brookings Institution established the Center for Middle East Policy (CMEP, formerly the Saban Center for Middle East Policy) "to promote a better understanding of the policy choices facing American decision-makers in the Middle East". The center was launched in May 2002 "with a special address by His Majesty King Abdullah II bin al-Hussein of the Hashemite Kingdom of Jordan to a select audience of policymakers in Washington, D.C."

The center was originally named after American-Israeli film and television producer Haim Saban. Saban, according to the center and its parent organization, "made a generous initial grant and pledged additional funds to endow the Center." According to a press release from Saban's charitable foundation, Saban "donated $13 million for the establishment of the Saban Center for Middle East Policy at the Brookings Institution." Saban, according to the center, ascribed his involvement to his "abiding interest in promoting Arab-Israeli peace and preserving American interests in the Middle East" that led him to fund the center. Some critics have charged that various sources of funding for the center have influenced its outlook, but the center has dismissed such allegations, saying that in all cases the donors respected the center's independence.

John Mearsheimer and Stephen Walt, in their 2006 article, wrote: "To be sure, the Saban Centre occasionally hosts Arab scholars and exhibits some diversity of opinion. Saban Center fellows ... often endorse the idea of a two-state settlement between Israel and the Palestinians. But Saban Center publications never question US support for Israel and rarely, if ever, offer significant criticism of key Israeli policies." Some Saban Center fellows have responded by criticizing the authors' scholarship and expansive definition of "Israel lobby". Martin Indyk stated that their "notion of a loosely aligned group of people that all happen to be working assiduously for Israel is indeed a cabal.... And this cabal includes anyone that has anything positive to say about Israel... And what does this cabal do? It 'distorts' American foreign policy, it 'bends' it, all these words are used to suggest that this cabal is doing something anti-American." Another fellow wrote that the authors' book "will pale in comparison [to other academic works] because the only way it can become an esteemed classic is if its underlying thesis is correct: that a domestic political lobby drives U.S. policy in the Middle East. If that were true, then the ruckus raised by The Israeli Lobby would establish the book as a classic. But it isn't true. Domestic politics and lobbying do matter when it comes to matters of tone and timing, but as Aaron David Miller, a veteran American peace-process diplomat, puts it...: "I can't remember a single decision of consequence American peace process advisers made, or one we didn't, that was directly tied to some lobbyist's call, letter, or pressure tactic."

In a September 17, 2014, article in Tablet, Lee Smith criticized the center for accepting substantial donations from the Qatari government, "a foreign government that, in addition to its well-documented role as a funder of Sunni terror outfits throughout the Middle East, is the main patron of Hamas—which happens to be the mortal enemy of both the State of Israel and Mahmoud Abbas' Fatah party." He suggested that the donations influenced the center's research analysis and Martin Indyk's statements as a State Department official and peace mediator. Brookings responded: "A review of publications and media appearances by our scholars in Doha and in Washington—all of which are available at Brookings.edu—demonstrate the same independence of thinking and objective, fact-based analysis about Qatar as on every other topic of our research. Our agreements with Qatar specifically protect the independence of our scholarship in all respects." Smith thanked the think tank for its response, but said it did "not satisfactorily address the key issues [his] article raises."

==== People ====
- Natan Sachs, Director and Fellow
- Daniel L. Byman, Senior Fellow
- Shadi Hamid, Senior Fellow
- Suzanne Maloney, Senior Fellow, and Vice President for Foreign Policy, Brookings
- Chris Meserole, Fellow
- Bruce Riedel, Senior Fellow

=== Brookings-Tsinghua Center for Public Policy ===
Brookings Institution
- Traditional Chinese: 清華-布魯金斯公共政策研究中心
- Simplified Chinese: 清华-布鲁金斯公共政策研究中心
Transcriptions
Standard Mandarin
- Hanyu Pinyin: Qīnghuá-bù Lǔjīnsī Gōnggòng Zhèngcè Yánjiū Zhōngxīn

In 2006, the Brookings Institution established the Brookings-Tsinghua Center (BTC) for Public Policy as a partnership between the Brookings Institution in Washington, DC and Tsinghua University's School of Public Policy and Management in Beijing, China. The Center seeks to produce research in areas of fundamental importance for China's development and for US–China relations. The BTC was directed by Qi Ye until 2019.

=== 21st Century Defense Initiative ===
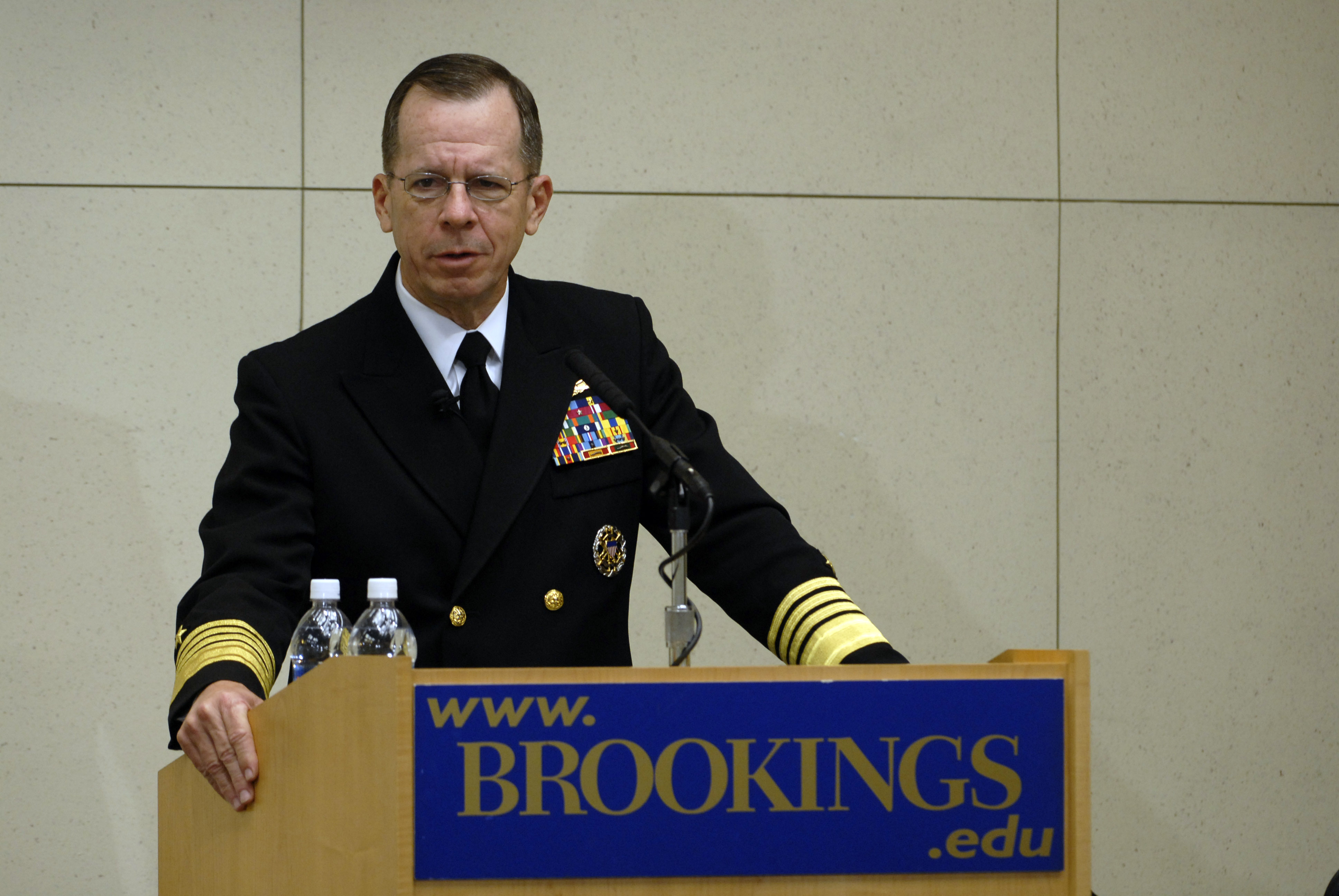
Adm. Michael Mullen speaks at the Brookings Institution in April 2007.

The 21st Century Defense Initiative (21CDI) is aimed at producing research, analysis, and outreach that address three core issues: the future of war, the future of U.S. defense needs and priorities, and the future of the US defense system. The Initiative draws on the knowledge from regional centers, including the Center on the United States and Europe, the Center for Northeast Asian Policy Studies, the Thornton China Center, and the Center for Middle East Policy, allowing the integration of regional knowledge. P. W. Singer, author of Wired for War, serves as Director of the 21st Century Defense Initiative, and Michael O'Hanlon serves as Director of Research. Senior Fellow Stephen P. Cohen and Vanda Felbab-Brown are also affiliated with 21CDI.

=== WashU at Brookings ===
Under MacLaury's leadership in the 1980s, the Center for Public Policy Education (CPPE) was formed to develop workshop conferences and public forums to broaden the audience for research programs. In 2005, the center was renamed the Brookings Center for Executive Education (BCEE), which was shortened to Brookings Executive Education (BEE) with the launch of a partnership with the Olin Business School at Washington University in St. Louis. The academic partnership is now known as "WashU at Brookings".

== Notable centers ==
- Center for Middle East Policy
- Center for Universal Education
- Urban-Brookings Tax Policy Center

== Funding controversies ==
A 2014 investigation by The New York Times found Brookings to be among more than a dozen Washington, D.C.–based research groups and think tanks to have received payments from foreign governments while encouraging American government officials to support policies aligned with those foreign governments' agendas. The Times published documents showing that Brookings accepted grants from Norway with specific policy requests and helped it gain access to U.S. government officials, as well as other "deliverables". In June 2014, Norway agreed to make an additional $4 million donation to Brookings. Several legal specialists who examined the documents told the paper that the language of the transactions "appeared to necessitate Brookings filing as a foreign agent" under the Foreign Agent Registration Act.

The government of Qatar was named by The New York Times as "the single biggest foreign donor to Brookings", reportedly contributing $14.8 million over a four-year period. A former visiting fellow at a Brookings affiliate in Qatar reportedly said that "he had been told during his job interview that he could not take positions critical of the Qatar government in papers". Brookings officials denied any connection between the views of their funders and their scholars' work, citing reports that questioned the Qatari government's education reform efforts and criticized its support of militants in Syria. But Brookings officials reportedly acknowledged that they meet with Qatari government officials regularly.

In 2018, The Washington Post reported that Brookings accepted funding from Huawei from 2012 to 2018. A report by the Center for International Policy's Foreign Influence Transparency Initiative of the top 50 think tanks on the University of Pennsylvania's Global Go-To Think Tanks rating index found that between 2014 and 2018, Brookings received the third-highest amount of funding from outside the United States compared to other think tanks, with a total of more than $27 million. In 2022, Brookings president John R. Allen resigned amid an FBI probe into lobbying on behalf of Qatar.

== Buildings ==
The main building of the Institution was erected in 1959 on 1775 Massachusetts Avenue. In 2009, Brookings acquired a building across the street, a former mansion built by the Ingalls family in 1922 on a design by Jules Henri de Sibour.

== See also ==
- List of think tanks in the United States
