= Wired for War =

Wired for War: The Robotics Revolution and Conflict in the 21st Century
- First edition
- Author: P. W. Singer
- Language: English
- Publisher: Penguin
- Publication date: 2009
- Pages: 400 pages
- ISBN: 1-59420-198-6
- OCLC: 277241234
- Dewey Decimal: 355.02/01/12 22
- LC Class: UG450 .S45 2009

Wired for War: The Robotics Revolution and Conflict in the 21st Century (Penguin, 2009) is a best-selling book by P. W. Singer. It explores how science fiction has started to play out on modern day battlefields, with robots used more and more in war.

== About the book ==
For the book research, Singer, a senior fellow at Brookings Institution, interviewed hundreds of robot scientists, science fiction writers, soldiers, insurgents, politicians, lawyers, journalists, and human rights activists from around the world. Even before publication, the work had already been featured in the video game Metal Gear Solid 4: Guns of the Patriots, as well as in presentations to audiences as diverse as the U.S. Army War College, Air Force Institute of Technology and the National Student Leadership Conference. Singer's 2009 book tour included stops on NPR's Fresh Air, the Daily Show with Jon Stewart, the opening of the TED conference, the Royal Court of the United Arab Emirates and presentations at 75 venues around the United States. The book was a non-fiction book of the year by the Financial Times and named to the official reading lists for the US Air Force, US Navy, and Royal Australian Navy.

== See also ==
- Virtual battlefield
- Unmanned undersea vehicle
- Paul Virilio
