= Robert Orlando =

American filmmaker and author (born 1964)

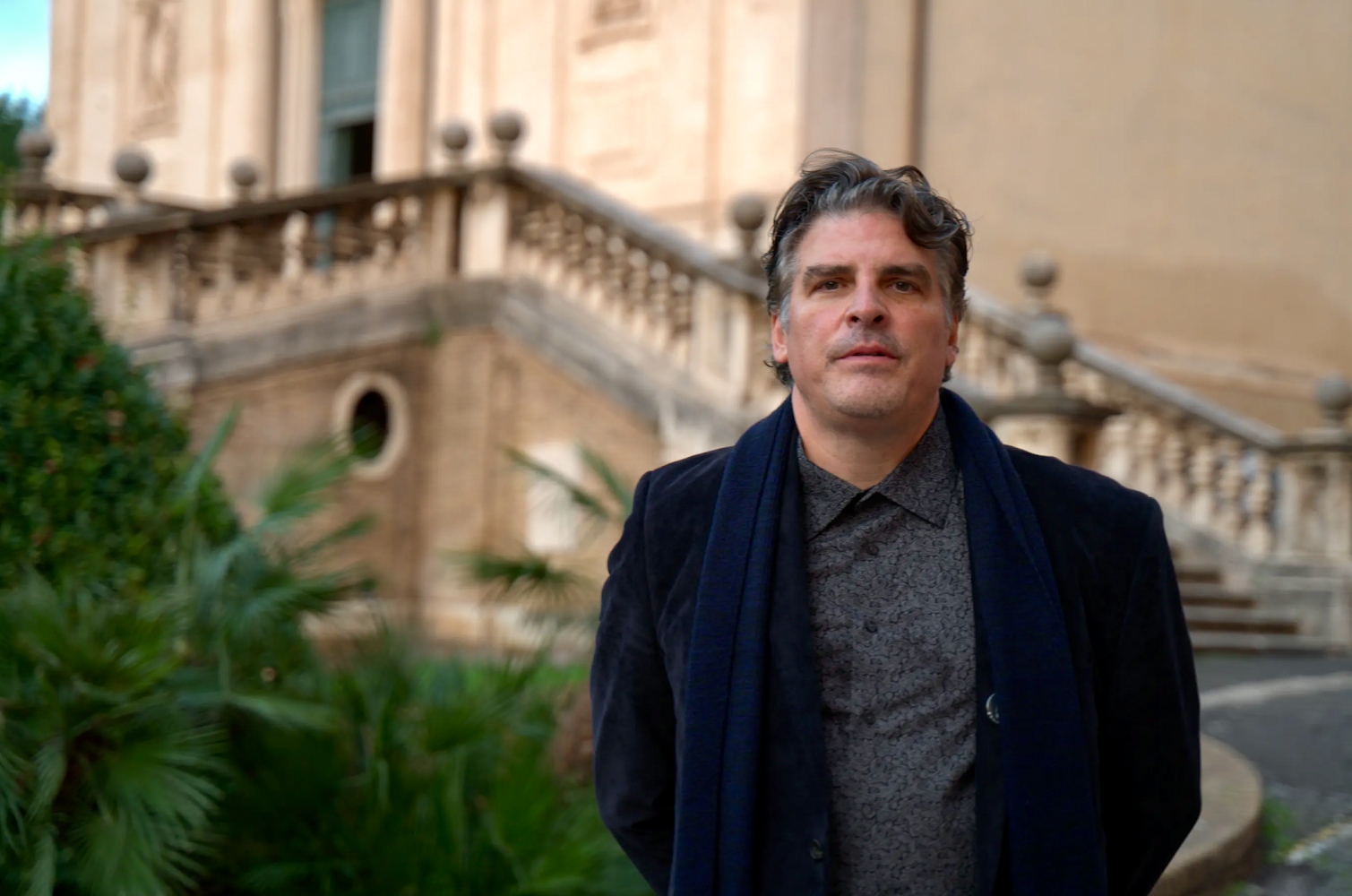
- Born: November 22, 1964 (age 61); New York City
- Occupations: Film Director, Author
- Website: www.robomantix.com

Robert Orlando (born November 22, 1964) is an American filmmaker, author, and media entrepreneur. His films range from animated shorts to full-length documentaries about subjects as varied as Pope John Paul II, Ronald Reagan, Donald Trump, General George Patton and St. Paul the Apostle. Critics have described him as an auteur and genre-buster because of his innovative approach to storytelling. He is best known for his film The Divine Plan: Reagan, John Paul II and the Dramatic End of the Cold War (2019), which was screened at the White House and the Vatican.

== Early life and education ==
Orlando was born in New York City to an Italian Catholic family. He was given his first movie camera at the age of 8, and a lifelong love affair with film began. “Movie-making came naturally to me,” he said. He attained his B.A in 1988, after attending the School of Visual Arts he studied scriptwriting, directing, editing, and film criticism. Inspired by his studies with renowned film critic Amy Taubin, he later went on to teach at courses on filmmaking and scriptwriting at his alma mater. Orlando's 1988 film debut, See Her Run, was chosen for the Tel Aviv International Student Film Festival.

He has also been a longtime student of religious studies, first at St. John's University and Columbia University, and later at Princeton Theological Seminary, where he earned a Master of Theological Studies and is currently completing a second master's degree in religion and society.

== Career ==
His first professional experience was as a studio manager for Vision Interfaith Satellite Network. In 1995 he formed his own boutique multimedia company, Nexus Media, known for its innovative approach to messaging and visual styles that help major Fortune 100 companies define and convey their message. Clients have included American Express, IBM, and Johnson and Johnson.

In 2005, Princeton University commissioned Orlando to create a series of inspiring videos about its schools for its “Aspire” capital campaign. Using inventive new documentary forms, he produced four short films that told compelling stories about the university and its students. The campaign raised $1.88 billion, making it the largest and most successful fundraising effort in Princeton's history.

Meanwhile, Orlando continued to produce ground-breaking films. His first full-length breakthrough film in 2000 was the psychological drama Moment In Time. In 2013, he produced a film on St. Paul and the crisis in early church, Apostle Paul: A Polite Bribe. The film and the accompanying book marked a shift for Orlando's work, prompting him to found two non-profits in Princeton, NJ: the Pauline Institute, which supports ecumenical research through the lens of religious studies, and the Nexus Institute, which develops new talent along with producing TV, motion pictures, books and screenplays, along with award-winning documentaries and shorts.

After the success of The Divine Plan (2019), Orlando went on to produce a film about Donald Trump's affair with media and its similarities to Charles Foster Kane's Citizen Kane, Donald Trump's Rosebud. In 2023, he released The Shroud, a genre-busting true crime-style investigation of the controversial burial cloth of Jesus Christ through a dual lens of science and faith.

Orlando's newest book, Karl Marx: The Divine Tragedy, will be published by TAN Books in 2025, followed by a visionary biopic, To Hell With Karl Marx. Orlando describes the project as “a spiritual exploration of Marx as an alternative to Christianity.” Other works in progress include the documentary Surviving the Kultursmog, and a new book and film on the Apostle Paul that expand on his work in Apostle Paul: A Polite Bribe. He is also working on a book and film about George Washington's internal and external battles during the first winter of the Revolutionary War, Washington's Cross.

== Recent films ==
- Apostle Paul: A Polite Bribe (2013)
- Silence Patton (2018)
- The Divine Plan (2019)
- Citizen Trump/Trump's Rosebud (2022)
- Luminous Dusk (2019)
- To Hell With Karl Marx (in production) (2025)
- Surviving the Kultursmog (in production) (2026)
- Washington's Cross (pre-production) (2026)
- The China Trap: Is War Inevitable? (in development) (2028)

== Books ==
- Apostle Paul: A Polite Bribe, Cascade Books, 2014, ISBN 978-1-62564-972-0
- The Divine Plan: Reagan, John Paul II and the Dramatic End of the Cold War, With Paul Kengor, ISI Books, 2019, ISBN 978-1-61017-154-0
- The Tragedy of Patton: A Soldier's Date With Destiny Humanix Books, 2020, ISBN 978-1-630-06176-0
- Citizen Trump: A One Man Show Post Hill Press distributed by Simon Schuster, 2021, ISBN 978-1-64293-916-3
- The Shroud: Face to Face, Sophia InstitutePress, 2023, UPC 9798889110286
- Karl Marx: The Divine Tragedy, TAN Books, 2026, ISBN 9781505135145
- Washington's Cross, 2026
