= Kermit Gordon =

American government official

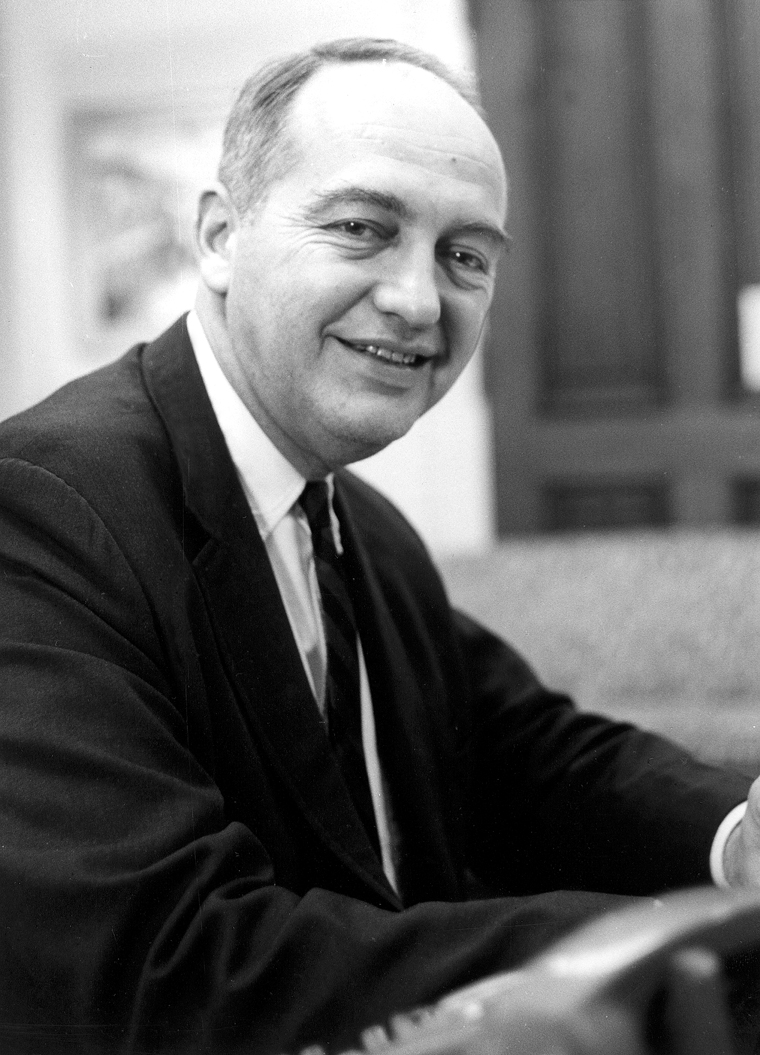

15th Director of the Bureau of the Budget
- In office December 28, 1962 – June 1, 1965
- President: John F. Kennedy; Lyndon Johnson
- Preceded by: David E. Bell
- Succeeded by: Charles Schultze

President of the Brookings Institution
- In office July 1, 1967 – June 21, 1976
- Preceded by: Robert D. Calkins
- Succeeded by: Gilbert Y. Steiner (acting)

Personal details
- Born: July 3, 1916 Philadelphia, Pennsylvania, U.S.
- Died: June 21, 1976 (aged 59) Washington, D.C., U.S.
- Party: Democratic
- Education: Swarthmore College (BA); University College, Oxford; Harvard University

Kermit Gordon (July 3, 1916 – June 21, 1976) was Director of the United States Bureau of the Budget (now the Office of Management and Budget) (December 28, 1962 – June 1, 1965) during the administration of John F. Kennedy. He continued to serve in this capacity in the Lyndon Johnson administration. He oversaw the creation of the first budgets for Johnson's Great Society domestic agenda. Gordon was a member of the Council of Economic Advisors, 1961–1962. After he retired from government service, he joined the Brookings Institution, first as vice president (1965–1967) and then as its president for nearly a decade (1967–1976). During his tenure, Brookings developed a left-of-center reputation chiefly because Gordon was a supporter of the Great Society and critic of the Vietnam War.

Born in Philadelphia, Pennsylvania, Gordon graduated from Upper Darby High School in 1933. He was inducted into Upper Darby High School's Wall of Fame posthumously, in 1980. After graduating from Swarthmore College in 1938, he was a Rhodes Scholar (1938–1939) and a Harvard administrative fellow. During World War II he worked in the Office of Price Administration before serving in the United States Army. After the war he was a special assistant in the Department of State's Office of Assistant Secretary of Economic Affairs until 1946, when he joined the faculty of Williams College. He was a professor of economics at Williams from 1955 until he joined the Kennedy Administration as a member of the Council of Economic Advisors.

During his time at Brookings, he served on several federal government boards including as Chairman of the Health Insurance Advisory Council (1965–1967), member of the Advisory Council on Social Security (1968–1971), and member of the Federal Pay Board (1971–1972). He was an elected member of the American Academy of Arts and Sciences and the American Philosophical Society.

Political offices
Preceded by David E. Bell	Director of the Bureau of the Budget; 1962–1965	Succeeded by Charles Schultze
Non-profit organization positions
Preceded by Robert D. Calkins	President of the Brookings Institution; 1967–1976	Succeeded by Gilbert Y. Steiner; Acting
