= Drake University =

Private university in Des Moines, Iowa, US

- Motto: Veritas (Latin)
- Motto in English: Truth
- Type: Private university
- Established: March 1881; 145 years ago
- Founders: George T. Carpenter and Francis Marion Drake
- Accreditation: HLC
- Academic affiliations: NAICU; CIC; Space-grant
- Endowment: $333.6 million (2025)
- President: Earl F. Martin
- Provost: Sue Mattison
- Academic staff: 300
- Total staff: 900+
- Students: 4,774 (spring 2022)
- Undergraduates: 2,848 (spring 2022)
- Postgraduates: 1,926 (spring 2022)
- Location: Des Moines, Iowa, United States; 41°36′08″N 93°39′15″W
- Campus: 150 acres (61 ha); Urban
- Newspaper: The Times-Delphic
- Colors: Blue and White
- Nickname: Bulldogs
- Sporting affiliations: NCAA Division I FCS - Missouri Valley; Pioneer Football League; MAAC; Summit League
- Mascots: Spike; Griff II
- Website: www.drake.edu

Drake University is a private university in Des Moines, Iowa, United States. It offers over 140 undergraduate and graduate programs, including professional programs in business, education, law, and pharmacy. Drake University Law School was founded in 1865, which makes it one of the 25 oldest law schools in the United States.

== History ==
Francis Marion Drake

Old Main Administration Offices

Drake University was founded in March 1881 by George T. Carpenter, a teacher and pastor, and Francis Marion Drake, a Union general during the Civil War. Drake was originally affiliated with the Christian Church (Disciples of Christ) at its founding, but the religious affiliation was terminated in 1907. The first classes convened in 1881, with 77 students and one building constructed, Student's Home.

In 1883, the first permanent building, Old Main, was completed. Old Main remains prominent on campus, housing administration offices, Levitt Hall, and Sheslow Auditorium, and as the site of many United States presidential debates and other events. The university's law school–the second oldest law school in the country west of the Mississippi River, after Saint Louis University School of Law–was established in 1865, by Chester C. Cole, who served on the Iowa Supreme Court from 1864 to 1876. Drake's first international students enrolled for classes in 1886, and were citizens of China, Persia, Armenia, and Japan. The first campus library opened on June 16, 1908. In 1920, due to a housing crisis, the university allowed social fraternities to use Greek letter emblems and affiliate with national offices.

The College of Education evolved out of the 1888 purchase of Callanan College of Women. In 1893, that Callanan entity became known as the Normal College, preparing students to be teachers until 1906. It was renamed as the School of Education or alternatively, as the College of Education between 1906 and 1987. The School of Education serves more than 1,000 undergraduate and graduate students.

Drake's law school, one of the 25 oldest law schools in the nation, traces its history to 1865. It is a charter member of the Association of American Law Schools; has been accredited since 1923, when accreditation began; and is one of only 75 ABA-approved law schools with a chapter of the Order of the Coif. Drake University Law School is home to the American Judicature Society; the archives of the National Bar Association, the nation's oldest and largest national association of predominately African American lawyers and judges; and the Drake Constitutional Law Center, one of only four constitutional law programs established by the U.S. Congress and funded by the federal government.

In 1887, the Iowa College of Pharmacy affiliated with Drake University and operated as one of the colleges of the university, until 1906, when it was discontinued. Drake was without a pharmacy school until 1939, when the Des Moines College of Pharmacy Corporation, which separated from Des Moines University in 1927, was dissolved and the college's staff and facilities became part of Drake University.

In 1931, the women's dormitory opened—the first on-campus student residence built since the university's founding. In 1937, ground was broken on commencement day for Cowles Library, now the university's primary library. In 1939, a new men's dormitory was completed, which included a student union, dubbed "The Kennel". In 1963, Kirk Residence Hall opened, then Meredith Hall opened, in 1965, opening the door for the College of Liberal Arts and the School of Journalism. During the height of nationwide student protests in 1970–culminating in the Student Strike of 1970–a bomb exploded inside Harvey Ingham Hall. No one was injured, but windows were shattered in nearby Meredith, Fitch and Herriott Halls. Ingham was decimated but repaired. The largest building on campus, the Harmon Fine Arts Center, opened in 1972. The Olmsted Center, Drake's student union building, opened in 1974.

On September 17, 1969, the Drake student newspaper, The Times-Delphic, published what appears to be the first documented account of the Paul is dead hoax. No articles published prior to this piece about the supposed death of Paul McCartney are evidenced, although fellow Times-Delphic reporter and musician Dartanyan Brown, one of the sources for the article, recalled hearing about the hoax from other musicians and reading about it in some underground newspapers.

In 1992, the Knapp Center opened as home to the men's and women's basketball teams, and the women's volleyball team. It contains four racquetball courts, five basketball and volleyball courts, a 200-meter track, and a weight training center. The facility hosted President Bill Clinton in 1996.

In 2013, Drake University became the home of The Harkin Institute for Public Policy & Citizen Engagement.

== Academics ==
Academic rankings

National
- Forbes: 211
- U.S. News & World Report: 179
- Washington Monthly: 186
- WSJ/College Pulse: 97

The university is organized into 7 colleges and schools:

- College of Arts & Sciences
- Zimpleman College of Business
- John Dee Bright College (Two-year associate degree program only)
- School of Education
- School of Journalism & Mass Communication
- Law School
- College of Pharmacy & Health Sciences

== Student life ==
Drake features over 160 student organizations, which including several fraternities and sororities.

The School of Journalism & Mass Communication (SJMC) magazine program has achieved national prominence. The Accrediting Council on Education in Journalism and Mass Communication (ACEJMC) team that visited in 1999, termed Drake's Magazines program the strongest undergraduate sequence in the country. In 2007, Drake student magazines THiNK and 515 won Pacemaker Awards.

== Athletics ==
Drake student-athletes compete in NCAA Division I in the Missouri Valley Conference in all sports except football, men's tennis and women's rowing. In football, Drake competes in the FCS NCAA Division I Pioneer Football League. In women's rowing, Drake competes in the Metro Atlantic Athletic Conference. In men's tennis, Drake competes in the Summit League.

- Basketball (men's and women's)
- Crew (women's)
- Cross-country (men's and women's)
- Football (men's)
- Golf (men's and women's)
- Soccer (men's and women's)
- Softball (women's)
- Tennis (men's and women's)
- Track & Field (men's and women's)
- Volleyball (women's)

=== History ===
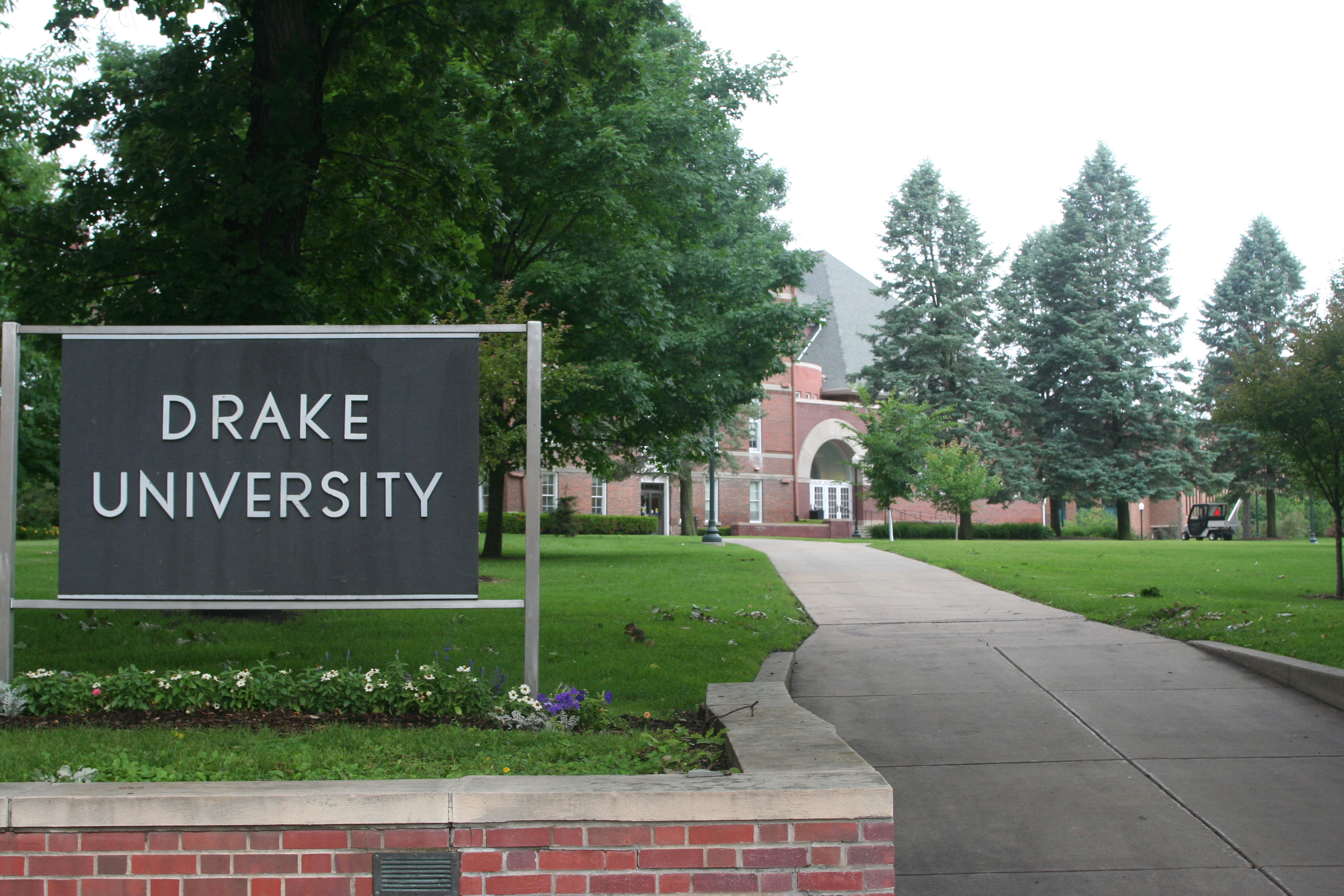
University entrance

In 1885, baseball became the university's first varsity sport, followed by football and track.

In 1904, Drake organized a women's basketball team, but Mary Carpenter, the first Dean of Women, banned the team as "not appropriate" for women.

Also in 1904, the athletic teams received their nickname of Bulldogs from a sportswriter who noticed that John L. Griffith, who coached every sport, was bringing his pet bulldogs to the practice fields. The teams had previously been known as the Ducklings and Ganders.

On October 11, 1905, Drake's first football field, Haskins Field, opened with a 17–0 loss to Iowa.

In 1928, Drake's football history continued when Drake defeated Simpson College 41–6 in what is believed to be the first night football game west of the Mississippi River. Perhaps the most famous incident in Drake's football history is known as the Johnny Bright Incident, where Pulitzer Prize-winning photographs in the Des Moines Register proved an intentional attack on the African American quarterback by Oklahoma A&M football players (Oklahoma A&M became Oklahoma State in 1957).

In 1969, Drake's men's basketball team reached the Final Four of the NCAA Tournament. Top-seeded UCLA Bruins men's basketball and its 7-foot megastar Lew Alcindor (later Kareem Abdul-Jabbar) barely escaped an upset in the national semifinals, 85–82.

In 1973, nearly 70 years after the original women's basketball team had been banned, Drake established a department of Women's Intercollegiate Athletics.

In 1981, senior Lewis Lloyd, the nation's second-leading scorer in Division I men's basketball, was named a first-team All-American. Drafted by the Houston Rockets, Lloyd went on to an eight-year NBA career.

In 1982, the first year of the NCAA women's basketball tournament, Drake came within one step of the Final Four.

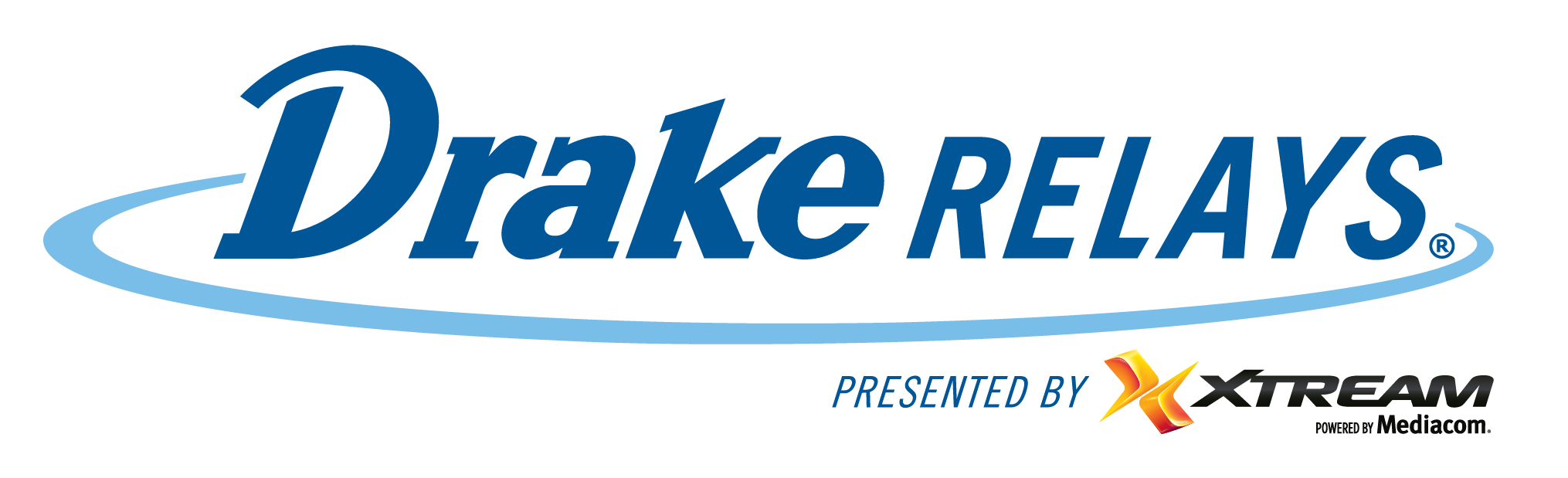
Drake Relays Logo

=== Drake Relays ===
Drake's most famous event, the Drake Relays, began in 1910 in a blizzard with fewer than 100 participants. In 1935 Jesse Owens set an American broad jump record (26 feet 1-3/4 inches) at the Drake Relays. Today, the Drake Relays draws athletes from all over the world, including Olympians. It is common to see Relays participants compete in the Summer Olympics and vice versa. Students' kick-off the Relays in the annual tradition of street painting, in which student organizations colorfully decorate areas of Carpenter Avenue near the center of campus under a common theme.

== See also ==
- Drake University Campus Historic District, listed on the National Register of Historic Places
- Vote Smart
- 620 Drakonia
