= David E. Bell =

American government official

David Bell
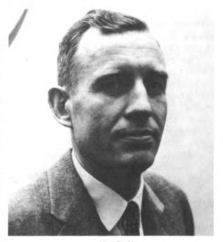

2nd Administrator of the United States Agency for International Development
- In office December 21, 1962 – July 31, 1966
- President: John F. Kennedy; Lyndon B. Johnson
- Preceded by: Fowler Hamilton
- Succeeded by: William Gaud

14th Director of the Bureau of the Budget
- In office January 22, 1961 – December 20, 1962
- President: John F. Kennedy
- Preceded by: Maurice Stans
- Succeeded by: Kermit Gordon

Personal details
- Born: David Elliot Bell; January 19, 1919 Jamestown, North Dakota, U.S.
- Died: September 6, 2000 (aged 81) Cambridge, Massachusetts, U.S.
- Party: Democratic
- Spouse: Mary Barry (m. 1943–2000)
- Children: 2
- Education: Pomona College (BA); Harvard University (MA)

David Elliott Bell (January 19, 1919 – September 6, 2000) was a director of the United States' Office of Management and Budget from January 22, 1961, until December 20, 1962, under President John F. Kennedy. Kennedy named him administrator of the Agency for International Development in late 1962. He left government service in 1966 to become the Executive Vice President of the Ford Foundation.

== Early life and family ==
David E. Bell was born on January 20, 1919, in Jamestown, North Dakota, the son of Florence and Reginald Bell. He spent part of his youth in San Francisco, while his father was teaching at Stanford University. In 1939, he received a B.A. from Pomona College, California, and in 1941 a M.A. in economics from Harvard University.

On November 17, 1943, he married Mary Louise Barry. When they met, Mary worked at the Commerce Department and later was employed as a 4th grade teacher. David and Mary had two children: a daughter Susan, and a son Peter. The Bells and their children traveled extensively in all parts of the world, and lived in several locations, including New York City, Boston, MA, Washington D.C., and Karachi, Pakistan. He continued to travel the world with his wife up until the time of his death.

== Military service ==
Bell joined the United States Marine Corps in December, 1942. He was trained at Fort Benning, Georgia, Camp Pendleton, California, and Quantico, Virginia, where he was an instructor. He served on land in Pearl Harbor from July 1945 until he was released from active duty on 21 September of the same year, at which point he was a First Lieutenant. He was promoted to the rank of Captain on 19 July 1948 and was honorably discharged on December 16, 1957.

== Government service ==
In 1942, he became a staff member at the Bureau of the Budget. During World War II (1942 to 1945) he served in the Marine Corps. From 1947 to 1951, Bell alternated between a position on the staff at the Bureau of the Budget, and a position as a special assistant to President Harry S. Truman. In 1951, Bell became Administrative Executive to the President. In these positions Bell worked on the formulation and evaluation of the administration's economic policies and programs. During this time, Bell also worked as a speech writer for President Truman.

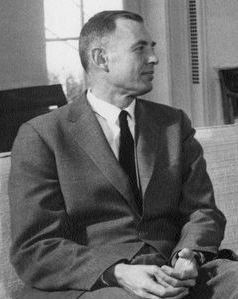
David E. Bell in 1963

In 1952, Bell left Washington temporarily to join the campaign staff of the Democratic nominee for president, Adlai Stevenson. Bell served Stevenson as a speech writer and as Stevenson's White House liaison. When the Truman administration ended in January 1953, Bell returned to private life. At the end of 1960, President-elect Kennedy asked Bell to become the Director of the Bureau of the Budget. Bell accepted, and was immediately put to work during the Eisenhower/Kennedy transition helping to formulate the new administration's economic policy. Some of Bell's other tasks were to map out legislative proposals and strategy, and to review the proposals made by other government agencies. At the end of 1962, President Kennedy asked Bell to become the new Administrator of the Agency for International Development, created in response to the Foreign Assistance Act of 1961. In this post Bell worked at developing foreign aid programs and legislation and appealing for funds and fighting budget cutbacks.

== Ford Foundation work ==
Bell left the government in the summer of 1966, and became Executive Vice President of the Ford Foundation, a private independent institution dedicated to advancing social justice in the US and in developing nations. During his time at the Ford Foundation, Bell was a member of a large number of advisory committees dealing with foreign aid and government reorganization. He left the Ford Foundation in 1980.

== Death ==
David Bell died of leukemia on September 6, 2000, in Cambridge, Massachusetts, at the age of 81. He was survived by his two children, seven grandchildren, and four great-grandchildren. Bell was notably tall and thin, and had an avid interest in arts and crafts. His home was filled with items he and his wife collected on their many trips abroad. Both Bell and his wife loved jazz and had friends in the arts. They were socially progressive for their time, strongly opposed segregation and sent their children to integrated schools.

Political offices
Preceded by Maurice Stans	Director of the Bureau of the Budget; 1961–1962	Succeeded by Kermit Gordon
Preceded by Fowler Hamilton	Administrator of the United States Agency for International Development; 1962–1966	Succeeded by William Gaud
