= Islands Society =

Nonprofit organization based in Hilton Head Island, South Carolina

- Formation: 2015 (Merger)
- Founder: Michael Edward Walsh
- Type: Charity; Think tank
- Legal status: 501(c)(3) charitable organization
- Purpose: Education; Insular Affairs; Foreign Policy
- Headquarters: Hilton Head Island, South Carolina
- Location(s): Beaufort County, South Carolina and Honolulu County, Hawaii
- Origins: Emerging Science and Technology Policy Centre
- Region served: Global
- President: Michael Edward Walsh
- Website: www.islandssociety.org

The Islands Society is a 501(c)(3) tax-exempt nonprofit organization whose vision is to be the premier global organization for mobilizing individuals and organizations in island communities to participate in foreign affairs and overseas engagements. Its policy research centers conduct policy studies and strategic analyses of political, economic, security, environmental, and social issues throughout the world, with a specific focus on insular affairs. Separately, its regional societies develop and implement education and leadership programs that are designed to bring about positive changes in local island communities.

== Mission ==
According to the organization's website:

The mission of the Islands Society is to inspire and empower islanders to participate in foreign affairs and overseas engagements in order to bring about positive changes in their local communities.

== Leadership ==
The Islands Society is led by its founder and president, Michael Edward Walsh, who is better known by his pen name, Eddie Walsh. Since its founding, the organization has developed strong ties with embassies, think tanks, and universities around the world. This is reflected in the composition of the board of advisors, which includes Ralph Cossa, the president of Pacific Forum CSIS. Other current advisors include the ambassadors, high commissioners, and honorary consuls from Austria, Fiji, New Zealand, Papua New Guinea, Philippines, Switzerland, and the United Kingdom. Former advisors include Abe Denmark.

== Organizational structure ==
The Islands Society is composed of a number of subsidiary policy research centers and regional societies. The policy research centers are autonomous think tanks whose mission is to develop innovative policies that bridge the divide between theory and practice in insular affairs. And, the regional societies are autonomous research institutes whose mission is to develop and implement programs that inspire and empower islanders in their region to participate in international engagements.

=== Policy research centers ===
As of November 2015, the Islands Society has three policy research centers. These include the Center on Public Diplomacy and Insular Affairs (CPDIL), Center on International Law and Insular Affairs (CILIA), and Center on International Security and Insular Affairs (CISIA). Staff affiliated with these centers regularly publish commentary and policy briefs in foreign policy outlets in Asia, Europe, Oceania, and North America.

=== Regional societies ===
As of November 2015, the Islands Society has eight regional societies that serve specific geographic regions of the world. These include the Arctic Islands Society, Baltic Islands Society, Caribbean Islands Society, Inland Islands Society, Pacific Islands Society, Remote Islands Society, Sea Islands Society, and Mediterranean Islands Society. Of these, the Pacific Islands Society is by far the largest.

==== Pacific Islands Society ====
The Pacific Islands Society (PacSoc) is an influential foreign policy research institute that operates as an autonomous arm of the Islands Society. It is currently based in Honolulu. To date, it has launched numerous programs for women, minorities, veterans, and next generation leaders across the Pacific. It has also attracted a large social media following. As of November 2015, its Facebook page has over 3,800 Likes.

==== Sea Islands Society ====
The Sea Islands Society (SeaSoc) is a public policy research institute that operates as an autonomous arm of the Islands Society. It is based on Hilton Head Island, South Carolina. It supports women, minorities, veterans, and next generation leaders who reside on barrier islands off the coast of Florida, Georgia, and South Carolina. It is also a member of the inter-agency working group that is tasked with establishing the Beaufort County Civil Rights Commission.

== Programs ==
The Islands Society has developed and implemented a number of programs for women, minorities, veterans, and next generation leaders from island communities. These include Next Generation Artists, Security Scholars, Young Leaders on Disarmament, and Local Female Leaders.

=== Congressional support ===
A number of members of Congress have spoken out in support of the organization's women and next generation programs. These include:

- In 2015, Congresswoman Aumua Amata (American Samoa) said, "I am always encouraged whenever I learn of new organizations whose mission is to help promote and assist Pacific Islanders in achieving their goals. It is the work of these organizations that has helped many of our people reach higher and do more than they ever thought possible, and I encourage our young people to get involved and take advantage of the opportunities that groups like the Islands Society provide."
- In 2013, Congressman Eni Faleomavaega (American Samoa) said, "I encourage every qualified student in American Samoa to take advantage of these unique opportunities."

== Merger ==
The Islands Society resulted from the merger of two pre-existing nonprofit organizations. In September 2015, the Emerging Science and Technology Policy Centre and the Pacific Islands Society officially merged. In that merger, the surviving nonprofit was the Emerging Science and Technology Policy Centre. It was renamed the Islands Society.

== Funding ==
The Islands Society is funded by private sources. It receives monetary and in-kind support from a variety of individuals and organizations.

== Awards ==
In November 2015, the Islands Society was recognized as a 2015 Top-Rated Nonprofit by the users of GreatNonprofits. It was one of only 10 recipients in South Carolina and the only recipient from Hilton Head Island. Prior to the merger, the Pacific Islands Society was also recognized as a 2014 Top-Rated Nonprofit.
