= The Strong Horse =

2010 book by Lee Smith

The Strong Horse: Power, Politics, and the Clash of Arab Civilizations
- Author: Lee Smith
- Genre: non-fiction
- Publisher: Doubleday
- Publication date: January 12, 2010
- ISBN: 978-0385516112
- OCLC: 780989868
- Website: Penguin Random House publisher page

The Strong Horse: Power, Politics, and the Clash of Arab Civilizations is a 2010 historical non-fiction book by journalist Lee Smith on Middle East politics and U.S. foreign policy in the region.

== Content ==
The book's title is drawn from Osama bin Laden’s assertion that "When people see a strong horse and a weak horse, by nature they will like the strong horse." Smith, who spent several years reporting from the Arab world, writes that "violence is central to the politics, society, and culture of the Arabic-speaking Middle East, and that Arab politics is driven by the "strong horse" principle." Smith himself cites the "strong horse" conceptualization of Arab politics to Ibn Khaldun (1332-1406).

Smith describes the region's rulers as self-interested factors struggling by any available means to retain their hold on power, while constantly threatened by regional power holders and by a rising generation of would be leaders. He denies that the region's problems are rooted in Western imperialism, "if we think that we are to blame for what is wrong with the Middle East - it is because of two things: our own narcissism and the tendency of Arab nationalists to blame outside forces for the problems of their region."

Smith argues that "Bin Ladenism is not drawn from the extremist fringe but represents the political and social norm [of the Arabic-speaking Middle East]." and "give(s) no credence to the idea that the Arab-Israeli crisis is the [Middle East’s] central issue." He argues that Arab governments and societies were on a self-destructive path. According to T. Edward Donselm writing in the Arab Studies Quarterly, Smith sees Islamism as an effort to employ the "a fourteen-hundred-year'old political institution" of jihad as a tool to restore Sunni Islam to the supremacism it enjoyed in Islam's first century.

== Reception ==
Reviewing the book in The Christian Science Monitor, Jackson Holahan wrote that The Strong Horse "is both succinct and accessible" and that the book "is an important read for anyone interested in the Middle East, and particularly in the involvement of the United States in the region since 2001." In the Middle East Quarterly, Anna Borshchevskaya said, "However unpleasant the truth may be, Smith's book is timely, important, highly readable, and essential to anyone interested in Middle East politics." Kirkus Reviews concluded that "Smith could have smoothed his narrative into a more coherent story, but he offers a somewhat provocative look at an endlessly troubled region."

In his review, Michael C. Moynihan faulted Smith for failing to perceive that "a peculiarly Arab version of democracy, with all its deficiencies, is indeed developing in Iraq—by Iraqis—with the help of steadfast American action."
