= Jason Cummins =

American economist

Jason Cummins is an American economist. He is the Head of Research and Chief US Economist at Brevan Howard Asset Management, an international hedge fund management group. Cummins is the Chairman of the Treasury Borrowing Advisory Committee (TBAC), a government-appointed panel under The Securities Industry and Financial Markets Association (SIFMA). Cummins also serves as a trustee on the board of The Brookings Institution and director on the board of Peterson Institute for International Economics.

== Education ==
Cummins earned a Ph.D. in economics from Columbia University, where he was a John M. Olin Fellow. Cummins received his B.A. from Swarthmore College in Swarthmore, Pennsylvania.

== Career ==
Cummins has been the Head of Research and Chief U.S. Economist at Brevan Howard Asset Management since 2004. Cummins develops the firm's outlook for the economy, politics, and markets, advises traders on portfolio management and manages the global research team.

Before his time with Brevan Howard, Cummins was senior economist at the Federal Reserve Board in Washington D.C., where he led the macro forecasting team as part of the Division of Research and Statistics. At the Federal Reserve, Cummins’ was responsible for preparing the staff's forecast for the Federal Open Market Committee, briefing the Federal Reserve Board of Governors on current developments, preparing speeches and testimony, and publishing scholarly research.

=== Research ===
His research includes analysis of temporary partial expensing, valuation of intangible capital, how uncertainty affects company investment, the relationship between the technological gap and productivity growth in postwar United States (1947–2000), and how competitive pressure doesn't always promote efficiency due to a relative information disadvantage.
