= Drake University Campus Historic District =

Historic district in Iowa, United States

- U.S. National Register of Historic Places
- U.S. Historic district
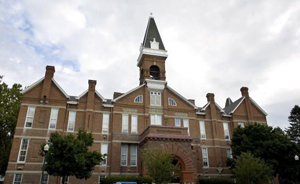
- Old Main, Drake University

- Location within Iowa Location within the United States
- Location: Roughly two blocks along University Ave. near 25th St. Des Moines, Iowa
- Coordinates: 41°36′03″N 93°39′07″W
- Area: 8.99 acres (3.64 ha)
- Architect: Smith & Gage, et al.
- Architectural style: Classical Revival
- MPS: Drake University and Related Properties in Des Moines, Iowa, 1881—1918 MPS
- NRHP reference No.: 88001341
- Added to NRHP: September 8, 1988

The Drake University Campus Historic District is located in Des Moines, Iowa, United States. The historic district contains six buildings. Five of the buildings are collegiate buildings on the Drake University campus and one is a church. The period of significance is from when the university was founded in 1881 to the end of the presidency of Hill M. Bell in 1918. The historic district has been listed on the National Register of Historic Places since 1988. It is part of the Drake University and Related Properties in Des Moines, Iowa, 1881—1918 MPS.

== History ==
Francis Marion Drake

The historic district comprises six buildings on the southeast corner of the Drake University campus. Five of the buildings belong to the university and other is a church complex. The importance of the district lies in the development of Drake University by the Disciples of Christ and the role the school and the church played in the development of this part of Des Moines. The academic buildings also relate to the role of General Francis Marion Drake, who founded the school and was its major benefactor in its early years, and the progressive period of the school's early president Hill M. Bell.

Drake University was established in 1881 and is the oldest institution of higher education in the city. Initially the Disciples of Christ held their services on the Drake campus. University Place Christian Chapel was organized in 1888 with 382 charter members. In 1977, Central Christian and University Christian Churches merged to form First Christian Church at this site. Old Main was the first building constructed in brick on the Drake campus. The other campus buildings in the historic district were built in the first decade of the 20th century. The present church building was constructed at the same time, and the adjoining education building was added in 1926. Drake University is no longer affiliated with the Disciples of Christ.

== Architecture ==
Old Main, designed by C.B. Lakin, is the oldest building on the campus. Built from 1882-1883, it is a rectangular shaped, three-story brick Victorian building. The main façade features five gables, corbelled chimneys and a central bell tower. The bricks between the windows are set at an angle. Stone courses serve as lintels and sills. The windows in the center of the building are decorated with stone panels on top. In 1900 the auditorium was added to the back of the structure and a new main entrance was added to the front.

Howard Hall was built in 1903 and the east wing was built five years later. A planned west wing was never built. The brick structure was built over a raised basement and features brick quoins, round- arch windows, continuous stone sills and lintels, shallow hipped roof and a small parapet. A large colored glass window contained music motifs, which relate to the buildings use by the Drake University Conservatory of Music. The building was designed by the architectural firm of Smith & Gage.

Cole Hall was built to house the law school and law library in 1904. Also designed by Smith & Gage it is a two-story red brick structure with dark grey brick base and concrete trim. The center bay is slightly recessed. Like the other buildings, it features classical detail, brick quoining semi-circular pediment, and continuous sills.

Memorial Hall was built for the Disciples of Christ Bible College in 1905. The three-story brick structure was built on a dark red-brown basement. The entryways slightly project forward. Unifying elements within the district include the rusticated brick for the high basement, continuous sills and lintels, concrete molding, concrete round-arched entries on the west and north, and classical detail. Smith & Gage was the architect.

Carnegie Library built from 1907-08 represents the shift from a sectarian school, its progressive educational policies and its need for funding at a national level. It was designed by the Des Moines architectural firm of Proudfoot & Bird. The brickwork in the building is multi-colored: pinkish-tan pilasters, panels between windows in gold and the base in dark red-brown brick. Like the other buildings, it features the restrained use classical motifs and a continuous sill. The building has a simple cornice with dentils across the top.

University Christian Church or "Lutheran Church of Hope+Elim" as it now named, was built in 1908 and the adjacent Education Building was built in 1926. The Education Building replaced the original 1890 University Place Christian Chapel. Proudfoot & Bird designed the church building and Burdette Higgins designed the Education Building. The church building, which has a seating capacity of 3,000 people, is similar to the later academic buildings in the Drake Historic District. The brick patterns on the exterior, however, are more elaborate. The two-story round arch entryways are not original to the building. The Education Building is a five-story tan brick structure with a corner bell tower. The exterior features Corinthian pilasters and arcades on the second floor and on the bell tower. Brick detailing includes both corbelling and dentils. The interior includes forty classrooms, gymnasium, church offices, chapel and fellowship hall. The second-floor chapel is a memorial to World War II dead.
