= Gilbert Y. Steiner =

Fourth President of the Brookings Institution

President of the Brookings Institution
- Acting
- In office 1976–1977
- Preceded by: Kermit Gordon
- Succeeded by: Bruce K. MacLaury

Personal details
- Born: Gilbert Yale Steiner; May 11, 1924 Brooklyn, New York
- Died: March 1, 2006 (aged 84) Chevy Chase, Maryland
- Spouse: Louise Steiner
- Education: Columbia University (BA); University of Illinois Urbana-Champaign (PhD)

Gilbert Yale Steiner (May 11, 1924 - March 1, 2006) was an American scholar of social policy who served as the fourth (interim) president of the Brookings Institution from 1976 to 1977.

== Early life and education ==
Steiner was born in Brooklyn, New York. He entered Columbia College with the class of 1944 but his studies were interrupted by World War II. After serving in the army, he resumed his studies at Columbia and earned a B.A. in 1945 and a M.A. in political science in 1946. He migrated to the University of Illinois Urbana-Champaign and earned his Ph.D. there in 1950. His doctoral dissertation was on congressional conference committees.

== Biography ==
Steiner received a faculty appointment at the University of Illinois Urbana-Champaign after graduation and taught there until 1966. In 1958, Steiner became director of the University's Institute of Government and Public Affairs, which advised the state and local governments of Illinois and brought him into contact with the state's political leaders.

He joined the Brookings Institution in 1966 as a senior fellow in the governmental studies program and became the director in 1968. He remained in the position until 1976, when he was named acting President of Brookings Institution by the board of trustees after the death of then President Kermit Gordon. During his tenure at Brookings, he published studies that helped shape the debate over the national social security system. As director of the governmental studies program, Steiner hired a variety of scholars such as Hugh Heclo, Donald L. Horowitz, Chester E. Finn Jr., Stephen H. Hess, Richard P. Nathan, and Martha Derthick, and gave them a great deal of freedom to design their research projects, ranging from presidential selection, congressional ethics, courts in the governmental process, field studies of administrative effectiveness, to social policy and urban policy; subsequently, their research contributed to the flourishing of the program and produced a number of books that survived as classics in the fields of political science. His leadership helped enhance the visibility and influence of the Brookings program in Washington and nationally.

He retired as a full-time scholar from Brookings in 1989 and was named senior fellow emeritus.

== Personal life ==
Steiner died on March 1, 2006, in Chevy Chase, Maryland. He was married to Louise King Steiner and the couple had three children and six grandchildren at the time of his death.

Non-profit organization positions
Preceded by Kermit Gordon	President of the Brookings Institution; Acting; 1976–1977	Succeeded by Bruce K. MacLaury
