= Center for a Just Society =

US non-profit organization

- Formation: 2004
- Type: NGO
- Headquarters: Washington, DC

The Center for a Just Society was a conservative non-profit organization located in Washington, D.C. The Center focused its work on providing conservative answers to social justice issues and is most known for the work of its chairman, Ken Connor. Connor was the lawyer for Jeb Bush during the Terri Schiavo case and served as the president of the Family Research Council before leaving and founding the Center in 2004. The Center is known for its online publications and has raised controversy in the conservative community for its work defending access to the courts.

The organization is now defunct, ceasing operations in 2014.
