= The Harkin Institute for Public Policy & Citizen Engagement =

Public policy research institute at Drake University

The Harkin Institute
- The Harkin Institute for Public Policy & Citizen Engagement
- Named after: Tom Harkin
- Formation: 2013; 13 years ago
- Founder: Tom Harkin
- Type: Nonprofit
- Purpose: public policy
- Headquarters: Tom and Ruth Harkin Center, Drake University
- Location: Des Moines, Iowa, United States of America
- Coordinates: 41°36′0.6″N 93°39′18″W
- Website: harkininstitute.drake.edu

The Harkin Institute is a nonpartisan public policy research institute located at Drake University in Des Moines, Iowa. Its official name is The Harkin Institute for Public Policy & Citizen Engagement. It was founded by Senator Tom Harkin in 2013, shortly after the Senator announced his intention to retire from the Senate in 2015.

== Mission ==
The Harkin Institute exists to inform citizens, inspire creative cooperation, and catalyze change on issues of social justice, fairness, and opportunity.

Founded on the premise that good public policy is best achieved when (1) policymakers have access to high quality information, (2) political processes are open and well understood, and (3) citizens are informed and active participants, the Harkin Institute offers programming, experiences, research, and connectivity focused on the areas that defined Senator Harkin's career.

=== Policy areas ===
The Harkin Institute's policy priorities are divided into four areas.

- People with Disabilities
- Retirement Security
- Wellness and Nutrition
- Labor and Employment

== History ==
As he was preparing to retire after 10 years in the House of Representatives followed by 30 years as a United States Senator, Harkin wished to establish a nonpartisan policy institute to uphold his legacy and carry on the policy work his career focused on. Initial conversations and fundraising efforts tentatively placed the Harkin Institute at the Senator's alma mater, Iowa State University, but he cut ties based on fears that the university's united voice on agriculture matters would cause university leaders to restrict academic freedoms and research at the institute.

Shortly after, the Harkin Institute settled at Drake University in the state's capital city.

In 2022, the Institute dedicated its new building, the Tom and Ruth Harkin Center, on the south side of the Drake University campus.

== The Tom Harkin Archival Collection ==
While founding the Harkin Institute, Senator Harkin made plans to donate his collection of papers, memorabilia, and other print and digital materials, which covers more than 40 years of public service, to Drake University's Cowles Library. These papers live alongside the papers of Governor Robert Ray and Representative Neal Smith, along with an Iowa Caucus collection that includes campaign files, memorabilia, audiovisual materials, and photographs.

Senator Harkin's papers arrived at Cowles Library in January 2015. Many parts of the collection are available to the public for research and study.

== National advisory council ==
Harkin Institute national advisory council members include:

- Marsha Ternus, former Iowa Supreme Court Chief Justice and inaugural executive director of the Harkin Institute
- Charlie Cook, editor and publisher of The Cook Political Report and columnist for National Journal
- Dr. Angela Franklin, president of Des Moines University
- Michael Gartner, Pulitzer Prize-winning journalist, former president of NBC News, and principal owner of the Iowa Cubs
- Ruth Harkin, former senior vice president of United Technologies Corporation and past member of the Iowa Board of Regents
- Rachel McLean, former vice president of communications of Ruan Companies
- Sally Pederson, former Lieutenant Governor of Iowa
- Stephen Roberts, former Iowa Republican State Chairman and attorney at Davis Brown Law Firm
- Nancy Shor, senior policy advisor at the National Organization of Social Security Claimants' Representatives
