= Lee Smith (journalist) =

American journalist

Lee Harold Smith (born April 10, 1962) is an American journalist and author.

He was born in San Juan, Puerto Rico, and was raised in New York City. Smith attended George Washington University and Cornell University, and studied Arabic at the American University in Cairo and Université Saint-Joseph in Beirut. He is a senior fellow at the Hudson Institute and was a senior editor at The Weekly Standard. Smith was formerly editor-in-chief of The Village Voice Literary Supplement, a national monthly literary review. He has written for publications including The New York Times, The Hudson Review, Ecco Press, Atheneum, Grand Street, GQ, and Talk.

At the time of the 9/11 attacks, Smith was working as an editor at The Village Voice and a contributor to Artforum. By his own account in his book, The Strong Horse: Power, Politics, and the Clash of Arab Civilizations., Smith was dissatisfied with the Orientalist explanations of the Muslim world as presented by Edward Said, whom he had met and spoken with about the region. As a result, he took a job as a foreign correspondent for The Weekly Standard and spent years reporting from the region. Smith followed up The Strong Horse with another book on Middle Eastern affairs, The Consequences of Syria, in 2014.

His 2019 book The Plot Against The President is an account of the 2016 US presidential election, and the roles played by the Russian government, US media, and US government agencies in the subsequent allegations of Russian collusion. A documentary film, The Plot Against the President, was created based on Smith's book.

His follow-up book, The Permanent Coup: How Enemies Foreign and Domestic Targeted the American President, was published in 2020. In October 2024, his book The China Matrix was published.
