= Florida Institute for Sustainable Energy =

Research institute

- Location: University of Florida
- Website: fise.institute.ufl.edu

The Florida Institute for Sustainable Energy is a research institute at the University of Florida designed to develop energy efficient and environmentally sustainable technologies and practices, educate the public regarding energy and environmental technologies and trade-offs, and inform the larger policy debate on urgent, global issues of sustainable energy and environment. The objective is to improve the region and United States energy security by developing indigenous and environmentally sustainable energy resources while promoting energy policies that have a positive impact on Florida's unique environment.

== See also ==
- List of University of Florida buildings
- University of Florida – Public university in Gainesville, Florida, US
