= Allegheny Institute for Public Policy =

American think tank

- President: Jake Haulk
- Budget: Revenue: $530,794; Expenses: $592,413 (FYE December 2017)
- Address: 305 Mt. Lebanon Blvd., Suite 208; Pittsburgh, PA 15234
- Location: Pittsburgh, Pennsylvania, United States
- Website: www.alleghenyinstitute.org

The Allegheny Institute for Public Policy is an American libertarian think tank based in Pittsburgh, Pennsylvania. Its research areas include economic development, tax increment financing, and eminent domain. The group advocates for free market policies in local government. Founded in 1995 by economist Jerry Bowyer, the Institute is connected to Richard Mellon Scaife. In 1997, its activities contributed substantially to the defeat of a proposed regional tax referendum to fund the construction of sports stadiums.

== Funding ==
Between 2001 and 2010, the Scaife Foundations were the Institute's largest funder, contributing a combined $2.4 million. The Laurel Foundation began making contributions in the 2010s.
