= Oregon Center for Public Policy =

American economic research organization

- Abbreviation: OCPP
- Formation: 1995
- Founder: Charles Sherketoff
- Type: NGO
- Headquarters: Portland, Oregon, United States
- Executive Director: Alejandro Queral
- Key people: Will Neuhauser; Robin Johnson; Robert Landauer
- Revenue: $604,165 (2015)
- Expenses: $512,445 (2015)
- Website: www.ocpp.org

The Oregon Center for Public Policy (OCPP) is an American economic research organization that conducts research and analysis of budget, tax, and economics issues to support policies that improve opportunities for all Oregonians. It supplies lawmakers with information "on issues affecting low- and moderate-income Oregonians".

== History ==
Charles Sherketoff founded OCPP in 1995 as its executive director, and in 1997 the Stern Family Foundation named him a public-interest pioneer and awarded him a $100,000 grant to support the center. The Statesman Journal reported its goals to break government stereotypes about work habits of the poor, and expand the discussions of tax spending in Oregon. Jerry Bieberle was the first president of the OCPP board.

In 2017, OCCP's board named Jefferson Smith its new executive director, but acrimony during the hiring process led to resignations of former governor Ted Kulongoski from the board. However, Smith resigned shortly after his appointment. In August 2018, Alejandro Queral became executive director.

== Policy positions ==
The Oregon Center for Public Policy has weighed in on how certain policies (such as welfare assistance programs, taxes, minimum wages, and unemployment benefits) would affect Oregonians. In 2007, The New York Times said OCPP "advocates for lower-income people".

The organization's policy analysts have advocated increases to the state minimum wage, as well as yearly wage increases that are based on the cost of living (which is measured by the Consumer Price Index). The OCPP typically weighs in each year on indexing increases to the state's minimum wage. When an early estimate for the 2011 indexed minimum wage increase (approximately 10-cents) was announced by state Labor Commissioner Brad Avakian in September 2010, the OCPP advocated the increase as a needed boost for the state's poor. The group also pointed out that the wage hike would act as a counterbalance to the coming state tax increase for gas and diesel.

The OCPP has also contributed to debate about Oregon's state budget and suggested tax increases as a way to help plug budget deficits. In January 2010, state voters in Oregon approved two ballot proposals, Measure 66 and Measure 67, that raised taxes on businesses (that make at least $250,000 per year) and households (that make at least $125,000 per year). The OCPP had pushed for these tax increases and said the campaign in Oregon was "a template" for other states that were also considering a number of tax increases.

The group has urged the Oregon state legislature to improve the state Earned Income Tax Credit (EITC) to help provide tax relief to the state's low-income workers, families, and children. It affiliates with the Center on Budget and Policy Priorities.

The Oregon Center for Public Policy has been described as "a liberal think tank" by the Oregonian. However, the Oregon Center for Public Policy describes itself as "a nonpartisan think tank."
