= Vanda Felbab-Brown =

American academic

Vanda Felbab-Brown is an American expert on internal and international organized crime. She is a senior fellow with the center for 21st Century Security and Intelligence in the Foreign Policy program at the Brookings Institution, a Washington-based thinktank.

== Education ==
In June 1999, Felbab-Brown obtained a B.A. in government from Harvard University. In February 2007, she completed a Ph.D. in political science at the Massachusetts Institute of Technology.

== Career ==
In 2007, Felbab-Brown worked as assistant professor at the School of Foreign Service at Georgetown University. In the fall of 2008, she became adjunct professor at the university. In 2009 and again in 2011, she was asked to work as adjunct professor at the University of Delaware. In 2012 and 2013, she was guest lecturer at the School of Advanced Military Studies in Fort Leavenworth. From March 2012 until July 2013, she also was on the advisory board of the Modernizing Drug Law Enforcement Initiative. Since June 2013, she has been a member of the Economics of International Drug Strategy expert group which is organized by the London School of Economics' IDEAS. Since March 2017, she has been a senior fellow for foreign policy at the Brookings Institution in Washington, D.C. In addition, she is involved in a number of projects at the Institution. She is co-director of the project "Reconstituting Local Orders" as well as director of the "Improving Global Drug Policy: Comparative Perspectives and UNGASS 2016" project.

== Awards ==
- Carroll Wilson Award, MIT Sloan School of Management, 2005
- American Political Science Association 2007 Harold Lasswell Award for the Best Dissertation in the Field of Public Policy, September 2007
- Outstanding Book Award for Aspiration and Ambivalence from Association of American University Presses, 2013

== Publications ==
- Shooting Up: Counter-insurgency and the War on Drugs (Brookings 2010)
- Bringing the State to the Slum: Confronting Organized Crime and Urban Violence in Latin America (Brookings 2011);
- Calderón's Caldron: Lessons from Mexico’s Battle Against Organized Crime and Drug Trafficking in Tijuana, Ciudad Juárez, and Michoacán (Brookings, 2011)
- Aspiration and Ambivalence: Strategies and Realities of Counterinsurgency and State-building in Afghanistan (Brookings, 2013)
