= Eddie Walsh (journalist) =

Michael Edward Walsh, commonly known as Eddie Walsh, is a senior foreign correspondent who covers diplomacy, defense, trade, and cultural issues in Africa and the Asia-Pacific region.

== Career ==
His work has featured across a variety of news media publications, including Al Jazeera English, The Washington Times, The Diplomat, The Korea Times, Korea JoongAng Daily, AOL, MSN, Gulf News, Jakarta Globe, and The Jerusalem Post. He also has been published in a number of academic journals and served as an author for Ashgate Publishing. He is best known for his reporting on Syria and one-on-one interviews with DC-based ambassadors.

Outside of his reporting duties, Walsh serves an Adjunct Fellow for Emerging Technologies and High-end Threats at the Federation of American Scientists, Senior Fellow at the Center for Australian and New Zealand Studies at Georgetown University, WSD-Handa fellow at Pacific Forum CSIS, a full member of the International Network of Emerging Nuclear Specialists, and Vice Chair of the International Correspondents Committee at the US National Press Club.

== Education ==
He received his BA from Johns Hopkins, MA from the Paul H. Nitze School of Advanced International Studies, and executive education from Harvard Business School and Wharton School of the University of Pennsylvania.
