= Bragdon =

Bragdon may refer to:

Surname:

- Claude Fayette Bragdon (1866–1946), American architect, writer and stage designer
- David Bragdon (born 1959), United States politician from Oregon
- John Stewart Bragdon (1893–1964), United States Army major
- Jonathan Bragdon, contemporary American landscape artist
- Richard Bragdon, Canadian politician from New Brunswick
- Peter Bragdon, United States politician from New Hampshire
- Tarren Bragdon (born 1975), American former state legislator and think tank founder

Location:

- Bragdon Formation, geologic formation in California
- Bragdon Hall, Reed College hall of residence
- Bragdon-Lipe House, historic home at Canajoharie, Montgomery County, New York
- Bragdon Wood, key fictional location in the novel That Hideous Strength by C. S. Lewis

It may also refer to:

- Bragdon v. Abbott, a Supreme Court of the United States case involving the Americans with Disabilities Act of 1990
