= Lovett and Ruth Peters Foundation =

Private foundation based in Cincinnati, Ohio

The Lovett and Ruth Peters Foundation
- Founded: 1994
- Founder: Lovett Peters, Ruth Peters
- Type: Private foundation
- Purpose: K-12 education
- Location: Cincinnati, Ohio
- Region served: Nationwide
- Method: Grants
- Key people: Daniel S. Peters

The Lovett and Ruth Peters Foundation is a 501(c)(3) private foundation based in Cincinnati, Ohio. The late oil and gas entrepreneur Lovett C. Peters and his late wife, Ruth Peters, established the foundation in 1994 in Massachusetts.

The foundation's primary mission is U.S. K-12 education reform, with a focus on school vouchers, other school choice initiatives, and charter schools More recently, the foundation has focused on technology-based education improvements like blended learning. Lovett Peters also founded the Pioneer Institute in Boston, one of the earliest State Policy Network think tanks and an organization which the foundation continues to support.

== The founders ==
Lovett C. ("Pete") Peters was born in 1913 in Amherst, Massachusetts. He persuaded Phillips Andover to admit him on scholarship at age 15, where he met his future wife, Ruth Stott, and he graduated from Yale University. Peters worked for Bankers Trust in New York City, served in the Army Air Corps in World War II, and then entered the oil and gas industry, working at Laclede Gas in St. Louis, Missouri, and rising to executive vice president at Conoco in Houston.

Peters returned to Massachusetts in the 1960s as an executive at chemical company Cabot. He later went into oil and gas on his own, making a fortune that he called "a fair chunk of money." Lovett and Ruth Peters worked alongside each other in their charitable activities, with Ruth dealing with "the human-relations end of things," complementing Lovett's approach of "solving complicated problems."

Ruth Stott Peters died in 2009 at the age of 92, and Lovett Peters died at the age of 97 in 2010. The Boston Globe described the Peters' philanthropic record as making "grand and genuine gestures toward charity, while rarely seeking credit for them." During their lifetimes, they founded two principal nonprofits, the Pioneer Institute and the Lovett and Ruth Peters Foundation, the latter of which has continued to support Pioneer.

== Founding the Pioneer Institute ==
Lovett Peters founded the Pioneer Institute, a free-market-oriented think tank focused on Massachusetts policy issues, in 1988 at age 75. Pioneer's main focus is education policy. Among the individuals Peters hired at Pioneer was future Massachusetts cabinet member and two-time gubernatorial candidate Charlie Baker.

Through Pioneer, Peters was one of the earliest funders of charter schools in Massachusetts. Lovett Peters' interest in state-level education reform led him to support other state-based free-market think tanks for education reform activities, which led to the Peters' foundation being a major funder of the State Policy Network, a national network of state-level right-wing policy institutes founded in 1992. When SPN was founded, the Pioneer Institute was one of only 12 members. As of 2014, there are 53 SPN members.

== Early activities of the foundation ==
After founding Pioneer, the Peters set up the Ruth and Lovett Peters Foundation in Massachusetts "to focus on reforming and improving K-12 education in the United States." In 2007, the foundation changed its name to the Lovett and Ruth Peters Foundation and relocated to Cincinnati, where Peters' son Daniel is based. The foundation initially focused on school choice, in particular through state-based think tanks.

Peters often encountered resistance to his efforts in Massachusetts. In 2000, he offered 22 low-performing elementary schools in six Massachusetts districts a bet: his foundation would help them convert to charter schools, and if after five years any school had not improved its performance, he would support its conversion back to a district school and pay the school $1 million. No school accepted Peters' offer.

== Recent activities ==
Lovett and Ruth's son Daniel took over the presidency of the foundation in 2000. Dan Peters became involved with Philanthropy Roundtable, serving as chairman from 2002 to 2008. According to philanthropist Laura Arrillaga-Andreessen, Peters saw an urgent need for more and better K-12 education philanthropy and helped Philanthropy Roundtable develop a popular program for donors that eventually included Gap founder and KIPP funder Don Fisher.

In recent years, the Peters Foundation has focused its giving on technology-enabled reforms like blended learning, which Dan Peters has said enables schools to serve more students more cost-effectively. For example, the foundation has funded the expansion of the Carpe Diem e-Learning Community to Cincinnati and Indianapolis.
