= Matthew Gagnon =

American writer

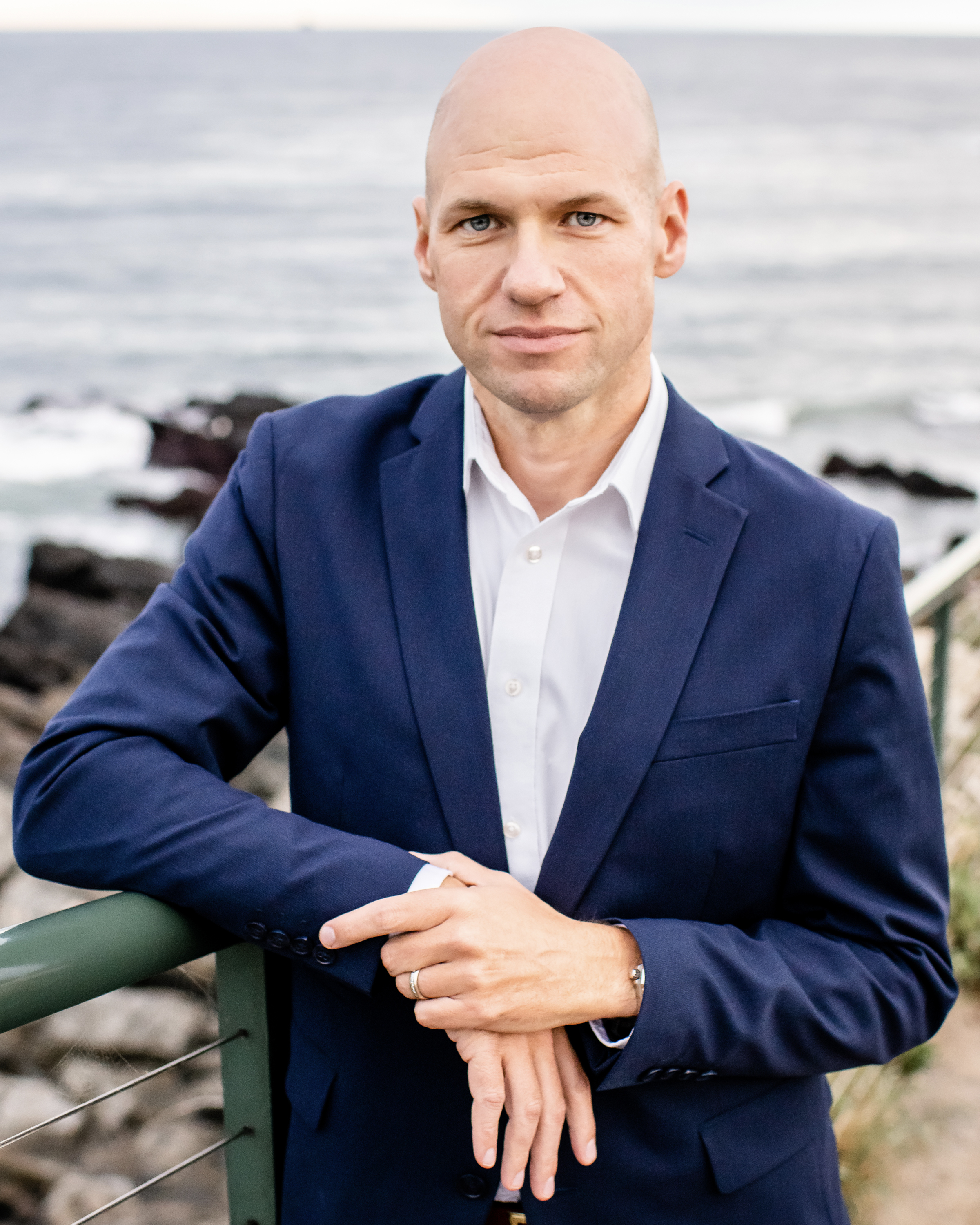
- Born: Matthew Owen Gagnon; December 10, 1980 (age 45); Walnut Creek, California, U.S.
- Education: University of Maine (BA); George Mason University (MA)
- Occupations: Think tank executive, political strategist, writer, radio host
- Employer: Maine Policy Institute
- Political party: Republican
- Spouse: Erin Gagnon
- Children: 5

Matthew Owen Gagnon (born December 10, 1980) is an American think tank executive, political strategist, and writer from Maine. He is the director and chief executive officer of the Maine Policy Institute, a free-market think tank based in Portland, Maine.

Gagnon was previously the director of digital strategy for the Republican Governors Association. He is a columnist for the Bangor Daily News and host of the morning show on Portland's largest talk-radio station, WGAN.

== Early life and education ==
Gagnon grew up in Hampden, Maine, a suburb of Bangor in Penobscot County, Maine.

After graduating from Hampden Academy, Gagnon went on to pursue a degree in political science at the University of Maine. While there, he became active in campus politics, joining the student government and becoming Chairman of the University of Maine College Republicans. He later served as the President of the University of Maine General Student Senate, as well as the President of Student Government. In 2003, the school recognized Gagnon with the Student Affairs Citation for Meritorious Service to the university. In his final year, he made an unsuccessful run to represent Old Town in the Maine House of Representatives.

== Career ==
In 2006, Gagnon moved to the Washington, D.C. area to pursue a career in politics. After a two-year stint as an intelligence analyst for an Annapolis-based private security firm, he moved on to the public affairs practice of a social media marketing agency, New Media Strategies. Gagnon worked with political campaigns, corporations and interest groups.

=== Republican strategist ===
In early 2010, Gagnon was named deputy director of Digital Strategy for the National Republican Senatorial Committee. He helped coordinate and direct the digital campaign strategy for 37 U.S. Senate races across the country. At the conclusion of the 2010 election, Gagnon became the Director of New Media Communications for Senator Susan Collins.

The Republican Governors Association named Gagnon its Director of Digital Strategy in January 2012. At the RGA, he was responsible for the committee's strategic digital initiatives in support of sitting Republican governors, as well as those campaigning for office. During the 2012 Wisconsin gubernatorial recall election, Gagnon was recognized for his use of digital strategies on Walker's behalf, and for what he called the practice of using "smart data", or political data being leveraged in detailed, specific ways to persuade and turn out voters. During his tenure at the RGA, Gagnon was recognized by Business Insider as one of the top 50 digital strategists in the country, and by Campaigns and Elections as one of the top 10 communicators in politics.

=== Maine Policy Institute ===
In August 2014, Gagnon was named the new chief executive officer of the Maine Heritage Policy Center, which later changed its name to the Maine Policy Institute (MPI). Founded in 2002, MPI is a free-market think tank that advocates for fiscally conservative policies in Maine. It is a member of the State Policy Network.

== Personal life ==
Gagnon is married to Erin Gagnon, a teacher, with whom he has five children. In 2013, he was involved in a serious car accident, which broke his back, requiring him to have spinal fusion surgery to repair the damage.
