= State Policy Network =

American civil policy advocacy organization

Coordinates: 38°53′38″N 77°04′17″W

- Abbreviation: SPN
- Predecessor: Madison Group (1986–1992)
- Formation: 1992 (34 years ago)
- Founder: Thomas A. Roe
- Type: Nonprofit
- Tax ID no.: 57-0952531
- Legal status: 501(c)(3)
- Headquarters: 1500 Wilson Blvd Suite 600 Arlington, Virginia, U.S.
- President: Chris Dauer
- Chairman: Lawson Bader
- Revenue: $25.2 million (2024)
- Expenses: $22.5 million (2024)
- Staff: 62 (2023)
- Website: spn.org

The State Policy Network (SPN) is an American nonprofit organization that serves as a network for conservative and libertarian think tanks focusing on state-level policy in the United States. The network serves as a public policy clearinghouse and advises its member think tanks on fundraising, running a nonprofit, and communicating ideas. Founded in 1992, it is headquartered in Arlington, Virginia, with member groups located in all fifty states.

== Overview ==
SPN describes itself as a "professional service organization" for a network of state-level think tanks across the United States. The president of SPN is Chris Dauer, formerly the chief operating officer of the Hoover Institution.

== History ==
The State Policy Network was founded in 1992 by Thomas A. Roe, a South Carolina businessman who was a member of the board of trustees of The Heritage Foundation. While Roe and several early figures associated with State Policy Network had professional ties to Heritage, the organization was founded as an independent network. Roe told U.S. President Ronald Reagan that he thought each of the states needed something like the Heritage Foundation. Reagan's reply was "do something about it," which led Roe to establish the South Carolina Policy Council (SCPC). SCPC adapted Heritage Foundation national policy recommendations, such as school choice and environmental deregulation, to the state legislative level.

SPN was an outgrowth of the Madison Group, a collection of state-level think tanks in South Carolina, Colorado, Illinois, and Michigan that had been meeting periodically at the Madison Hotel in Washington, D.C. Roe was chairman of the board of directors of SPN from its founding until his death in 2000. Gary Palmer, co-founder and president of the conservative think tank the Alabama Policy Institute from 1989 until 2014, helped found SPN and served as its president.

Initially, SPN's network consisted of fewer than 20 member organizations. Lawrence Reed, the first president of the Mackinac Center for Public Policy, a Michigan-based free market think tank, fostered new state-level regular member organizations through delivery of his think tank training course. By the mid-1990s, SPN had a network of 37 think tanks in 30 states. By 2014, there were 65 member organizations, including at least one in each state.

Starting in 1993, the SPN has held an annual meeting in various U.S. cities. These meetings serve as a chance for members to discuss and analyze policy priorities, train and build members, and refine operations, among other topics.

== Policy positions ==
Policy initiatives supported by SPN members have included reductions in state health and welfare programs, state constitutional amendments to limit state government spending, expanded access to charter schools, and school vouchers. Another area of activity has been opposition to public-sector trade unions. Tracie Sharp, SPN's former president, has said the organization focuses on issues such as "workplace freedom, education reform, and individual choice in healthcare."

The liberal magazine Mother Jones stated that in 2011 SPN and its member organizations were backing a "war on organized labor" by Republican state lawmakers. Legislative actions taken by the GOP included the introduction and enactment of bills reducing or eliminating collective bargaining for teachers and other government workers and reducing the authority of unions to collect dues from government employees. In Iowa, Governor Terry Branstad cited research by the Public Interest Institute, an SPN affiliate in Iowa, when asking to amend laws to limit collective bargaining by public employees.

In December 2013, The Guardian, in collaboration with The Texas Observer and the Portland Press Herald, obtained, published and analyzed 40 grant proposals from SPN regular member organizations. The grant proposals sought funding through SPN from the Searle Freedom Trust. According to The Guardian, the proposals documented a coordinated strategy across 34 states, "a blueprint for the conservative agenda in 2014." The reports described the grant proposals in six states as suggesting campaigns designed to cut pay to state government employees; oppose public sector collective bargaining; reduce public sector services in education and healthcare; promote school vouchers; oppose efforts to combat greenhouse gas emissions; reduce or eliminate income and sales taxes; and study a proposed block grant reform to Medicare.

== Political influence ==
In 2006, three former presidents of SPN member organizations were serving as Republicans in the United States House of Representatives: Mike Pence of Indiana, Jeff Flake of Arizona, and Tom Tancredo of Colorado. National Review described them as having "used SPN organizations as political springboards."

SPN introduced model legislation for state legislators to implement on the state level to undermine the Affordable Care Act. The organization also pushed for states not to expand Medicaid.

== Leadership ==
Tracie Sharp served as SPN's president and CEO for 25 years. In 2025, she announced that she would be stepping down from her role upon the appointment of a successor. In The Wall Street Journal, Kimberley Strassel wrote that during Sharp's tenure, "SPN has in that time become the hub for conservative and libertarian think tanks focused on state-level reform and played a huge role in wins on school choice and tax reform." In August 2025, Chris Dauer was named SPN's next president.

Lawson Bader, who is the president and CEO of DonorsTrust, serves as the chairman of SPN's board of directors.

== Finances ==
SPN is a 501(c)(3) nonprofit organization. Its independently audited 2013 Internal Revenue Service Form 990 showed $8 million in revenue and $8.4 million in expenditures, of which $1.3 million was used for grants and payments to other organizations. In 2023, SPN had annual revenue of $27.1 million and annual expenses of $25.8 million.

In 2011, Mother Jones reported that SPN is largely funded by donations from foundations, including the Lovett and Ruth Peters Foundation, the Castle Rock Foundation, and the Bradley Foundation. In 2013, Sharp told Politico that, like most non-profit organizations, SPN keeps its donors private and voluntary. In 2013, The Guardian reported that SPN received funding from the Koch brothers, Philip Morris, Kraft Foods, and GlaxoSmithKline. Other corporate donors to SPN have included Facebook, Microsoft, AT&T, Time Warner Cable, Verizon, and Comcast.

Between 2008 and 2013, SPN received $10 million from Donors Trust, a nonprofit donor-advised fund. In 2011, the approximately $2 million investment from Donors Trust accounted for about 40% of annual revenue.

== Activities ==
SPN provides grant funding to its member organizations for start-up costs and program operating expenses. In 2011, SPN granted $60,000 in start-up funds to the Foundation for Government Accountability, a free market think tank based in Naples, Florida. SPN also provides practical support to its members, who meet each year at SPN conferences. SPN member organizations exchange ideas and provide training and other support for each other. In 2008, a spokesperson for the progressive advocacy group People for the American Way said in 2008 that SPN trained its member organizations to run like business franchises. In a 2013 statement to The New Yorker, then SPN president Sharp denied that SPN was a franchise and said that member organizations were free to select their own staff and priorities.

SPN is a member of the American Legislative Exchange Council (ALEC), an organization that drafts and shares state-level model legislation for conservative causes, and ALEC is an associate member of SPN. SPN is among the sponsors of ALEC. A 2009 article in an SPN newsletter encouraged SPN members to join ALEC, and many SPN members are also members of ALEC. ALEC is "SPN's sister organisation," according to The Guardian.

SPN member think tanks aided the Tea Party movement by supplying rally speakers and intellectual ammunition.

== Member organizations ==
As of 2015, SPN had a membership of 65 think tanks and hundreds of affiliated organizations in all 50 states. Membership in SPN is by invitation only and is limited to independently incorporated 501(c)(3) organizations that are "dedicated to advancing market-oriented public policy solutions." The SPN membership program consists of affiliate and associate organizations. While affiliate members are state-based, associate members are national in scope and are not necessarily focused on a single state. According to Politico, SPN's associate members include a "who's who of conservative organizations," including the Cato Institute, Heritage Foundation, Americans for Prosperity Foundation, FreedomWorks, Americans for Tax Reform, and American Legislative Exchange Council. In 2011, SPN and its regular member organizations received combined total revenues of $83.2 million, according to a 2013 analysis of their federal tax filings by the liberal watchdog group Center for Media and Democracy.

=== Affiliates ===
Regular members are described as "full-service think tanks" operating independently within their respective states.

- Alabama: Alabama Policy Institute
- Alaska: Alaska Policy Forum
- Arizona: Goldwater Institute
- Arkansas: Arkansas Policy Foundation, Opportunity Arkansas
- California: California Policy Center, Pacific Research Institute
- Colorado: Independence Institute
- Connecticut: Yankee Institute for Public Policy
- Delaware: Caesar Rodney Institute
- Florida: Foundation for Government Accountability, James Madison Institute
- Georgia: Georgia Center for Opportunity, Georgia Public Policy Foundation
- Hawaii: Grassroot Institute
- Idaho: Idaho Freedom Foundation, Mountain States Policy Center
- Illinois: Illinois Policy Institute
- Indiana: Indiana Policy Review Foundation
- Iowa: Iowans for Tax Relief Foundation
- Kansas: Kansas Policy Institute
- Kentucky: Bluegrass Institute for Public Policy Solutions
- Louisiana: Pelican Institute for Public Policy
- Maine: Maine Policy Institute
- Maryland: Maryland Public Policy Institute
- Massachusetts: Pioneer Institute
- Michigan: Mackinac Center for Public Policy
- Minnesota: Center of the American Experiment, Freedom Foundation of Minnesota
- Mississippi: Empower Mississippi, Mississippi Center for Public Policy
- Missouri: Show-Me Institute
- Montana: Frontier Institute
- Nebraska: Platte Institute for Economic Research
- Nevada: Nevada Policy
- New Hampshire: Josiah Bartlett Center for Public Policy
- New Jersey: Garden State Initiative
- New Mexico: Rio Grande Foundation
- New York: Empire Center for Public Policy
- North Carolina: John Locke Foundation
- North Dakota: Rough Rider Policy Center
- Ohio: Buckeye Institute
- Oklahoma: Oklahoma Council of Public Affairs
- Oregon: Cascade Policy Institute
- Pennsylvania: Commonwealth Foundation for Public Policy Alternatives
- Rhode Island: Rhode Island Center for Freedom and Prosperity
- South Carolina: Palmetto Promise Institute, South Carolina Policy Council
- South Dakota: Great Plains Public Policy Institute
- Tennessee: Beacon Center of Tennessee
- Texas: Texas Public Policy Foundation
- Utah: Libertas Institute, Sutherland Institute
- Vermont: Ethan Allen Institute
- Virginia: Thomas Jefferson Institute, Virginia Institute for Public Policy
- Washington: Freedom Foundation, Washington Policy Center
- West Virginia: Cardinal Institute for West Virginia Policy
- Wisconsin: MacIver Institute for Public Policy, Badger Institute, Wisconsin Institute for Law and Liberty, Institute for Reforming Government
- Wyoming: Wyoming Liberty Group

== Roe Awards ==
The Roe Award, first presented in 1992, is named after SPN founder Thomas A. Roe. It honors individuals who have successfully promoted free market philosophy while displaying innovation and accomplishment in public policy. The physical statue is an eagle, "a symbol of liberty with courage and conviction necessary for its preservation".

== Overton Award ==
The Overton Award was created in 2003 after the death of Joseph Overton at age 43. Overton is known for the idea, posthumously called the Overton window, about the range of policies politically acceptable to the mainstream at a given time.

The award is given to chief operating officers or executive vice presidents of non-profit free market organizations who demonstrate the personal qualities that Overton possessed. These include humility in supporting their peers, leadership that builds a team, and developing strategies that magnify the ideas and influence of their organization. As of 2026, the award has been given six times.

== See also ==
- American Legislative Exchange Council
- Americans for Prosperity Foundation
- Americans for Tax Reform
- Cato Institute
- Foundation for Government Accountability
- FreedomWorks
- The Heritage Foundation
