= Al Higdon =

Advertising executive

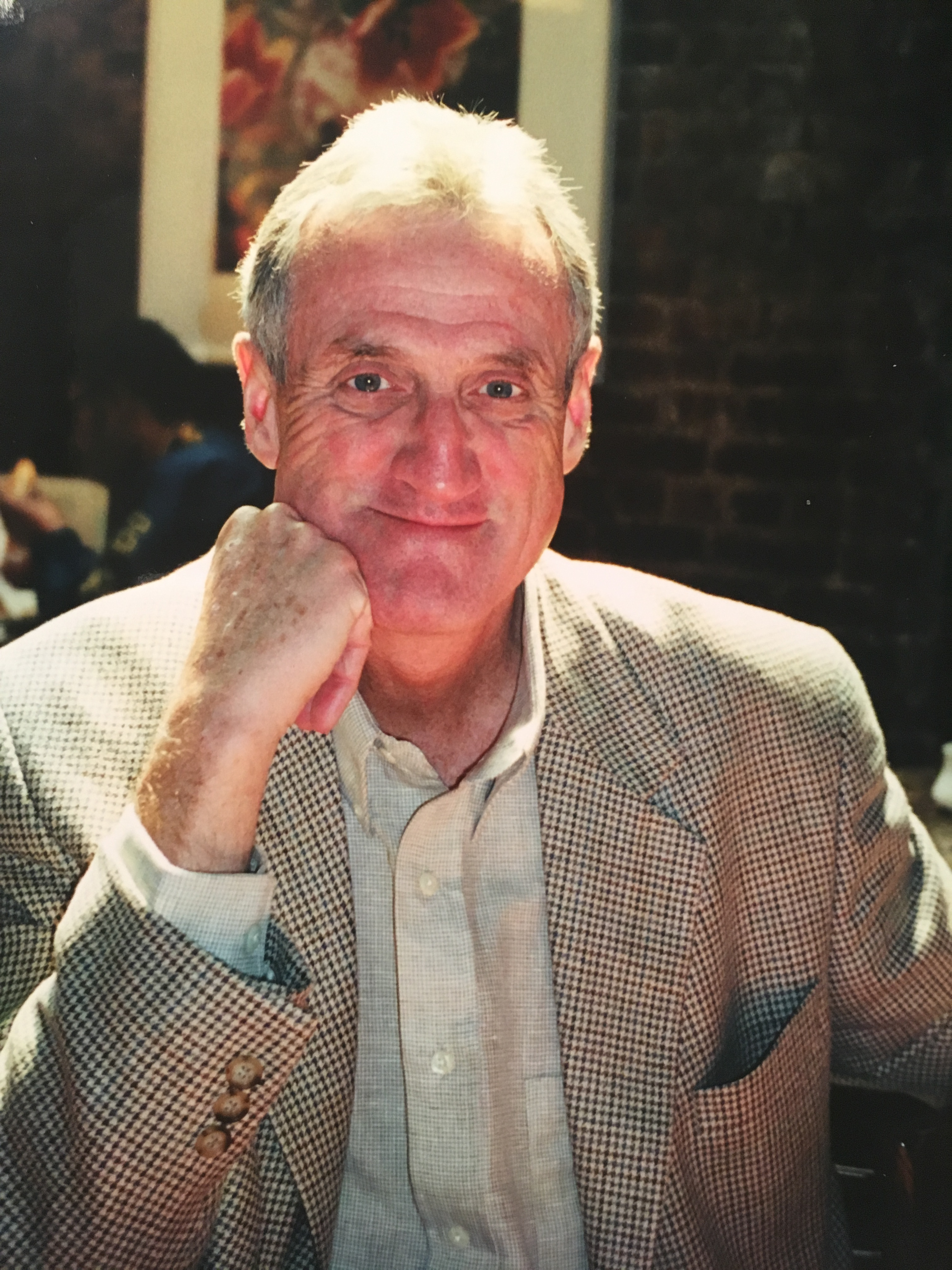
Allan "Al" Higdon in 2018.

Allan "Al" K. Higdon (born 1936) is an American retired advertising and public relations executive. Primarily based in Wichita, Kansas, he specialized in marketing and communications for the aircraft industry. Higdon worked at Beech Aircraft Corporation, where he helped introduce the Beechcraft King Air. He also worked at Learjet Corporation, where he developed a strategic approach to promote Learjet aircraft and make the brand well known among the public. Higdon partnered with Wendell Sullivan to form the advertising and public relations firm Sullivan Higdon Inc. In 1979, the firm was renamed to Sullivan Higdon & Sink. In 2019, the firm changed its name again to Signal Theory. Today, Signal Theory has over 140 employees spread across the Wichita and Kansas City metro regions.

== Education ==
Higdon is a 1954 graduate of Wichita High School East. In 1954, he entered the University of Wichita (now Wichita State University), as a business administration major. He transferred to the University of Kansas as a junior, graduating in 1958 with a degree in business administration. He earned a second degree in journalism from Wichita State in 1961.

== Career ==
Higdon began his career in 1958 working at James R. Hanson & Associates, a public relations counseling firm in St. Louis, Missouri. In 1959 he returned to Wichita, enrolling at Wichita State University. There, he served as business manager of the university newspaper and graduated with a degree in journalism in 1961.

In January, 1961, he joined Beech Aircraft Corporation (now Textron Aviation) in the firm's public relations department, advancing to press relations manager in 1963. While at Beech he helped introduce the Beechcraft King Air.

In 1964, Higdon was recruited by his former boss and mentor James Greenwood to join Lear Jet Corporation, founded a year earlier by William P. Lear, Sr., prior to the first customer delivery of the Lear Jet Model 23 business jet. At Learjet, Higdon and Greenwood worked under Bill Lear’s direction to promote Learjet aircraft as leading business jets in a global field of more than a half dozen larger competitors. For the next seven years, during a series of new model introductions, this objective was achieved by getting Learjets placed in numerous movies and television shows, in non-aviation product print advertisements from luggage to automobiles, on more than 100 magazine covers, and achieving several dozen world flight performance records, including two around-the-world flights, one piloted by golfer-aviator Arnold Palmer.

In 1971, Higdon resigned as director of Learjet public relations and partnered with his long-time friend and former Beech Aircraft associate Wendell Sullivan to launch their own advertising and public relations firm, Sullivan Higdon Inc. In 1979, the firm changed its name to Sullivan Higdon & Sink (SHS) to reflect naming as partner Vaughn Sink, who joined the firm in 1972. On March 6, 2019, the firm was renamed to Signal Theory.

After 25 years as co-founding partner, chairman, and CEO, Higdon retired from SHS in 1996, at age 60. His clients included Learjet, Cessna Aircraft, Piaggio Aircraft (Italy), Coleman Outdoor Products, Pizza Hut, Inc., Koch Industries, and divisions of American Airlines, B.F. Goodrich and Rockwell International.

== Pop culture ==
The final episode of the American period drama television series "Mad Men" directly references the Learjet campaign led by Higdon. Commenting on the episode shortly after it aired, Higdon stated, "Those were heady days for Learjet. It was kind of incredible to think it all came to life last night on 'Mad Men.'"

== Professional activities ==
Higdon is an active member of the Wichita community. Higdon has served as chair of Exploration Place, president of River Festivals Inc., chair of United Way of the Plains, Alex de Tocqueville Society, president of Music Theatre of Wichita, president of the Wichita Business Responsibility Council, and on boards of the Wichita Area Chamber of Commerce, Wichita/Sedgwick County Long-Range Planning Task Force, the Salvation Army, Wichita Art Museum, the Knight Foundation, Junior Achievement and Wichita Community Foundation, as well as serving as an advisory board member of the Kansas Policy Institute. For one year he served as interim president (pro bono) of the Greater Wichita Economic Development Coalition.

Higdon served as chair of the Wichita State University Foundation's National Advisory Council and as a member of the WSU board of trustees. He was also a member of two WSU presidential search committees. For the University of Kansas, he served as chair of the KU Endowment Association's Chancellor's Club and member of the William Allen White Foundation and business school dean's advisory council.

After his retirement from SHS, Higdon served eight years as professional-in-residence at the WSU Elliott School of Communication, teaching graduate classes in advertising management and public relations case studies. During this time he also served as a volunteer medical transportation driver for the American Red Cross.

== Honors and awards ==
Higdon earned several awards during his career. In 1973, he was named Wichita Advertising Person of the Year, and in 1976 he was named Wichita Public Relations Professional of the Year. He received the Advertising Federation Silver Medal Award (2010), served as Admiral Windwagon Smith of the Wichita River Festival (1989), elected into the Junior Achievement Business Hall of Fame (2008), named recipient of the Wichita Aero Club trophy (2015), WSU Trustees Award (1997) and WSU Elliott School of Communications Alumnus of the Year (2003).

== Personal ==
In 1958 Higdon married Judy Dold. They were married for 64 years before her death in 2022. The couple have three children, Sarah Higdon Fearn (born 1966), Adam (born 1967) and Claudia (born 1968). Higdon has five grandchildren and six great grandchildren.
