= 2024 Wisconsin Question 2 =

2024 Wisconsin Question 2 may refer to:

- April 2024 Wisconsin Question 2, held alongside the state's spring election
- August 2024 Wisconsin Question 2, held alongside the state's fall primary
