= 2024 Wisconsin elections =

- April 2, 2024; November 5, 2024

The 2024 Wisconsin fall general election was held in the U.S. state of Wisconsin on November 5, 2024. One of Wisconsin's U.S. Senate seats and all of Wisconsin's eight seats in the U.S. House of Representatives were up for election, as well as sixteen seats in the Wisconsin Senate and all 99 seats in the Wisconsin State Assembly. Voters also chose ten electors to represent them in the Electoral College, which will participate in selecting the president of the United States. The 2024 fall partisan primary was held on August 13, 2024. The filing deadline for the Fall election was June 3, 2024. Concurrent with the Fall general election, there was also a special election in Wisconsin's 8th congressional district to serve the remaining months of the 118th United States Congress.

The result of the fall election was mixed. The Republican Party presidential candidate, Donald Trump, won the state's presidential electors, but Democratic incumbent United States senator Tammy Baldwin was re-elected. None of the state's U.S. House seats changed partisan control. Republicans maintained majorities in both state legislative chambers going into the 107th Wisconsin Legislature, but Democrats made significant gains, flipping four seats in the Wisconsin Senate, and ten seats in the Wisconsin State Assembly.

The 2024 Wisconsin spring election was held April 2, 2024. This election featured the Democratic and Republican presidential nominating contests, though both party nominations were already clinched before Wisconsin voted. Two seats of the Wisconsin Court of Appeals were also up for election, but neither was contested. There were also various nonpartisan local and judicial offices on the ballot, including a county executive and mayoral election in Wisconsin's most populous city and county, Milwaukee. The 2024 Wisconsin spring primary was held on February 20, 2024. The filing deadline for the Spring election was January 2, 2024.

There were also five constitutional amendments on the ballot in 2024—the largest number of amendments in a single year in Wisconsin since 1986. Two of the amendments were voted on at the Spring general election, two others appeared on the Fall primary ballot, and one question appeared on the Fall general election ballot. The Fall primary ballot questions represented the first time in Wisconsin history that a constitutional amendment appeared on a primary ballot. Republicans supported all five amendments, with Democrats opposing them. Both Spring ballot amendments and the Fall general election amendment passed, while both Fall primary ballot amendments failed.

== Federal offices ==
=== President ===
Wisconsin's vote for presidential electors in the race for President of the United States was part of the Fall general election held on November 5, 2024. The incumbent president, Joe Biden, initially planned to seek a second four-year term and won a sufficient number of Democratic National Convention delegates to secure his renomination. However, Biden announced on July 21, 2024, that he would drop out of the race and endorsed his vice president, Kamala Harris. Harris subsequently secured the support of Democratic convention delegates and was nominated at the Democratic National Convention. Vice President Kamala Harris faced former president Donald Trump in the general election.

Third-party candidates who appeared on the ballot in Wisconsin include Green Party nominee Jill Stein, Libertarian Party nominee Chase Oliver, Constitution Party nominee Randall Terry, Party for Socialism and Liberation nominee Claudia De la Cruz, and independent candidates Cornel West and Robert F. Kennedy Jr. Kennedy has endorsed Donald Trump but was unable to remove his name from the ballot.

==== Democratic primary ====
Wisconsin's Democratic presidential preference primary was on the ballot for Wisconsin's Spring general election, Tuesday, April 2, 2024. Incumbent president Joe Biden secured enough delegates to be renominated before the Wisconsin primary took place. U.S. representative Dean Phillips (MN-03) and Author Marianne Williamson also sought the nomination. Williamson suspended her campaign following the Nevada Primary on February 7, 2024, but re-entered the campaign following the Michigan primary on February 27, 2024. In spite of this, Williamson never gained ballot access in the state. Phillips suspended his campaign on March 6, after the Super Tuesday primaries and endorsed Biden. Despite his suspension, Phillips name still appeared on the ballot. Lawyer Robert F. Kennedy Jr. was briefly a declared candidate for the Democratic nomination but withdrew to pursue an independent bid.

Due to backlash against the government's policies toward the Gaza war, a movement was started to vote for uninstructed delegates in the presidential primary. Biden ultimately won 88% of the primary vote, 8% of the vote was for uninstructed delegates.

After Biden withdrew from the presidential election, on July 21, 2024, Wisconsin's Biden delegates switched their support to Vice President Kamala Harris.

==== Republican primary ====
Wisconsin's Republican presidential preference primary was on the ballot for Wisconsin's Spring general election, Tuesday, April 2, 2024. Former president Donald Trump secured enough delegates to be renominated before the Wisconsin primary took place. Former United Nations ambassador Nikki Haley, incumbent Florida governor Ron DeSantis, former Arkansas governor Asa Hutchinson, and businessman Vivek Ramaswamy were all candidates, but withdrew during the primaries. Former New Jersey governor Chris Christie, former Vice President Mike Pence, U.S. senator Tim Scott (SC), U.S. representative Will Hurd (TX-23), North Dakota governor Doug Burgum, Miami mayor Francis Suarez, radio host Larry Elder, and businessman Perry Johnson were also candidates, but withdrew from the race before voting began. Despite these withdrawals Christie, Ramaswamy, DeSantis, and Haley all appeared on the primary ballot, alongside an option for an uninstructed delegation.

Trump received 79% of the primary vote, with Haley receiving 13%, DeSantis with 3%, and 2% for uninstructed delegates.

=== U.S. Senate ===
A regularly scheduled United States Senate election was held for Wisconsin's Class 1 United States Senate seat at the Fall general election, November 5, 2024. Incumbent Democratic senator Tammy Baldwin was elected to a third six-year term. Baldwin narrowly defeated Republican hedge fund manager Eric Hovde, who had previously sought the Republican nomination for this Senate seat in 2012. Two other independent candidates also appeared on the general election ballot: Phil Anderson (Disrupt The Corruption) and Thomas Leager (America First).

There were two other candidates in the Republican primary, UW–Stevens Point College Republicans chair Rejani Raveendran and farmer and perennial candidate Charles Barman. Two other Republicans initially announced their candidacy but subsequently withdrew from the race: Trempealeau County supervisor Stacey Klein and retired U.S. Army Reserve sergeant major Patrick Schaefer-Wicke.

United States Senate election in Wisconsin, 2024
Party	Candidate	Votes	%	±%
Democratic	Tammy Baldwin (incumbent)	1,672,418	49.38%	−5.98
Republican	Eric Hovde	1,643,302	48.52%	+3.99
Disrupt the Corruption	Phil Anderson	42,344	1.25%	N/A
America First	Thomas Leager	28,724	0.85%	N/A
Write-in				
Total votes		3,386,788	100.0%	
Democratic hold				

=== U.S. House of Representatives ===
Wisconsin's eight seats in the United States House of Representatives were on the ballot in the Fall general election, held on November 5, 2024. Concurrent with the Fall general election, a special election was held in Wisconsin's 8th congressional district to serve the remaining months of the 118th United States Congress, following the resignation of Mike Gallagher.

==== 8th district special election ====
District		Previous Incumbent		This Election	
Location	2023 CPVI	Representative	First elected	Result	Candidates
Wisconsin 8	R+10	Mike Gallagher	2016	Incumbent resigned April 24, 2024. New member elected November 5, 2024. Republican hold.	▌ ✓ Tony Wied (Republican) 57.36%; ▌Kristin Lyerly (Democratic) 42.64%

==== U.S. House general election ====
District		Incumbent			This race	
Location	2022 PVI	Member	Party	First elected	Result	Candidates
Wisconsin 1	R+3	Bryan Steil	Republican	2018	Incumbent re-elected.	▌ ✓ Bryan Steil (Republican); ▌Peter Barca (Democratic); ▌Chester Todd Jr. (Green)
Wisconsin 2	D+19	Mark Pocan	Democratic	2012	Incumbent re-elected.	▌ ✓ Mark Pocan (Democratic); ▌Erik Olsen (Republican)
Wisconsin 3	R+4	Derrick Van Orden	Republican	2022	Incumbent re-elected.	▌ ✓ Derrick Van Orden (Republican); ▌Rebecca Cooke (Democratic)
Wisconsin 4	D+25	Gwen Moore	Democratic	2004	Incumbent re-elected.	▌ ✓ Gwen Moore (Democratic); ▌Robert Raymond (Independent); ▌Tim Rogers (Republican)
Wisconsin 5	R+14	Scott Fitzgerald	Republican	2020	Incumbent re-elected.	▌ ✓ Scott Fitzgerald (Republican); ▌Ben Steinhoff (Democratic)
Wisconsin 6	R+10	Glenn Grothman	Republican	2014	Incumbent re-elected.	▌ ✓ Glenn Grothman (Republican); ▌John Zarbano (Democratic)
Wisconsin 7	R+12	Tom Tiffany	Republican	2020 (special)	Incumbent re-elected.	▌ ✓ Tom Tiffany (Republican); ▌Kyle Kilbourn (Democratic)
Wisconsin 8	R+10	Vacant			Rep. Mike Gallagher (R) resigned April 24, 2024. New member elected. Republican hold.	▌ ✓ Tony Wied (Republican); ▌Kristin Lyerly (Democratic)

== State elections ==
=== Legislative ===
Following the Wisconsin Supreme Court's decision in Clarke v. Wisconsin Elections Commission, the state legislative maps were re-drawn by governor Tony Evers and the Wisconsin state legislature to comply with the contiguity requirement of Article IV, Sections 4 and 5 of the Constitution of Wisconsin.

==== State Senate 4th district special election ====
A special election was held on July 30, 2024, to fill the 4th Senate district seat vacated by the resignation of Lena Taylor. A special primary was held July 2, 2024.

Two candidates filed to run in this election, state representatives LaKeshia Myers and Dora Drake. Dora Drake won the special primary, July 2, 2024, and was unopposed at the special election on July 30.

Dist.	Previous Incumbent			This Election		
Dist.	Senator	Party	First elected	Result	Candidate(s)	Defeated in primary
04	Lena Taylor	Dem.	2004	Incumbent resigned on January 26, 2024. New member elected July 30, 2024. Democratic hold.	▌ ✓ Dora Drake (Dem.)	▌LaKeshia Myers (Dem.)

==== State Senate ====
The 16 even-numbered districts out of 33 in the Wisconsin Senate were on the ballot for the Fall general election, November 5, 2024. Of those seats, 10 were held by Republicans and 6 were held by Democrats. Democrats won 10 of the 16 seats up for election for a net gain of four seats. Republicans will hold 18 of the 33 seats in the Wisconsin Senate at the start of the 107th Wisconsin Legislature.

		Party (majority caucus shading)		Total
		Democratic	Republican	Total
Last election (2022)		5	12	17
Total after last election (2022)		11	22	33
Total before this election		11	22	33
Up for election		6	10	16
of which:	Incumbent retiring	1	2	3
of which:	Vacated	1	0	1
of which:	Open	1	3	4
of which:	Unopposed	5	0	5
This election		10	6	16
Change from last election		▲4	▼4	
Total after this election		15	18	33
Change in total		▲4	▼4	

==== State Assembly ====
All of the 99 seats in the Wisconsin State Assembly were on the ballot for the Fall general election, November 5, 2024. Prior to the election, 64 seats were occupied by Republicans, 34 by Democrats, with one seat, formerly held by a Democrat, vacant. Democrats won 45 of the 99 seats in the 2024 election, for a net gain of ten seats in the Assembly. Republicans will have 54 of 99 Assembly seats at the start of the 107th Wisconsin Legislature.

		Party (majority caucus shading)		Total
		Democratic	Republican	Total
Last election (2022)		35	64	99
Total after last election (2022)		35	64	99
Total before this election		35	64	99
Up for election		35	64	99
of which:	Incumbent retiring	14	9	23
of which:	Open	5	12	17
of which:	Moving districts	1	9	10
of which:	Vacated	1	0	1
of which:	Unopposed	11	2	13
This election		45	54	99
Change from last election		▲10	▼10	
Total after this election		45	54	
Change in total		▲10	▼10	

=== Judicial ===
==== State Court of Appeals ====
Two seats on the Wisconsin Court of Appeals were on the ballot for the Spring general election, April 2, 2024.

- In District I, incumbent judge Pedro Colón, appointed by Governor Tony Evers in 2023, was elected to a full six-year term, running unopposed. One other candidate, Milwaukee County circuit judge Gwen Connolly, filed to run for the seat but failed to make the ballot.
- In District IV, incumbent judge JoAnne Kloppenburg was elected to a third six-year term, running unopposed. She was first elected in 2012 and re-elected in 2018, both times also without opposition.

==== State Circuit Courts ====
Fifty six of the state's 261 circuit court seats were on the ballot for the Spring general election, April 2, 2024. Only ten seats were contested, four incumbent judges faced a challenger, three were defeated.

- In Columbia County, attorney Roger L. Klopp defeated incumbent judge Troy D. Cross.
- In Door County, family court commissioner Jennifer Moeller defeated attorney Brett Reetz to succeed retiring judge D. Todd Ehlers.
- In Kenosha County, court commissioner Heather Iverson defeated incumbent judge Frank Gagliardi in the general election. Another court commissioner, William Michel, was eliminated in the primary.
- In La Crosse County, incumbent judge Mark A. Huesmann defeated former judge Candice C. M. Tlustosch in the general election.
- In Milwaukee County, Branch 43, state representative Marisabel Cabrera defeated attorney Rochelle N. Johnson-Bent to succeed retiring judge Marshall B. Murray.
- In Oneida County, assistant district attorney Mary M. Sowinski defeated county corporation counsel Michael Fugle to succeed retiring judge Michael H. Bloom.
- In Racine County, Branch 3, assistant district attorney Jessica Lynott defeated incumbent judge Toni L. Young in the general election.
- In Sauk County, attorney Blake J. Duren defeated attorney Nancy Thome to succeed retiring judge Patricia A. Barrett.
- In Walworth County, deputy county corporation counsel Estee E. Scholtz defeated court commissioner Peter M. Navis to succeed retiring judge Laura Lau.
- In Winnebago County, court commissioner Michael D. Rust defeated former judge LaKeisha D. Haase to succeed retiring judge Teresa S. Basiliere. Another court commissioner, Eric R. Heywood, was eliminated in the primary.

Circuit	Branch	Incumbent		Elected			Defeated			Defeated in Primary
Circuit	Branch	Name	Entered office	Name	Votes	%	Name	Votes	%	Name(s)
Ashland		Kelly J. McKnight	2018	Kelly J. McKnight	2,781	98.79%	--Unopposed--			
Barron	2	--Vacant--		Samuel L. Lawton	7,508	99.43%	--Unopposed--			
Brown	2	Thomas J. Walsh	2012	Thomas J. Walsh	38,128	99.27%	--Unopposed--			
Brown	6	John P. Zakowski	2012	John P. Zakowski	39,183	99.27%	--Unopposed--			
Buffalo–Pepin		Thomas W. Clark	2018	Thomas W. Clark	3,518	99.18%	--Unopposed--			
Calumet	1	Jeffrey S. Froehlich	2012	Jeffrey S. Froehlich	7,953	99.35%	--Unopposed--			
Chippewa	1	Steven H. Gibbs	2017	Steven H. Gibbs	11,549	99.17%	--Unopposed--			
Clark	1	Lyndsey Boon Brunette	2018	Lyndsey Boon Brunette	4,991	99.11%	--Unopposed--			
Columbia	3	Troy D. Cross	2018	Roger L. Klopp	5.883	51.61%	Troy D. Cross	5,497	48.22%	
Dane	1	Susan M. Crawford	2018	Susan M. Crawford	89,390	99.06%	--Unopposed--			
Dane	8	Frank D. Remington	2012	Frank D. Remington	88,548	98.97%	--Unopposed--			
Dane	10	Ryan D. Nilsestuen	2022	Ryan D. Nilsestuen	87,481	99.06%	--Unopposed--			
Dane	11	Ellen K. Berz	2012	Ellen K. Berz	87,679	98.97%	--Unopposed--			
Dane	12	Ann Peacock	2023	Ann Peacock	86,664	99.10%	--Unopposed--			
Door	1	D. Todd Ehlers	2000	Jennifer Moeller	6,309	63.10%	Brett Reetz	3,684	36.85%	
Eau Claire	3	Emily M. Long	2018	Emily M. Long	15,541	99.01%	--Unopposed--			
Eau Claire	4	Jon M. Theisen	2011	Jon M. Theisen	16,049	98.96%	--Unopposed--			
Eau Claire	5	Sarah Harless	2018	Sarah Harless	15,273	99.07%	--Unopposed--			
Fond du Lac	1	Anthony Nehls	2022	Anthony Nehls	11,556	99.91%	--Unopposed--			
Jefferson	3	Robert F. Dehring Jr.	2016	Robert F. Dehring Jr.	12,156	98.85%	--Unopposed--			
Juneau	1	Stacy A. Smith	2018	Stacy A. Smith	3,943	99.19%	--Unopposed--			
Kenosha	2	Jason A. Rossell	2011	Jason A. Rossell	21,573	98.47%	--Unopposed--			
Kenosha	3	Frank Gagliardi	2023	Heather Iverson	16,652	53.15%	Frank Gagliardi	14,624	46.68%	William Michel
La Crosse	3	Mark A. Huesmann	2023	Mark A. Huesmann	12,247	56.67%	Candice C. M. Tlustosch	9,364	43.33%	
Manitowoc	2	Jerilyn M. Dietz	2018	Jerilyn M. Dietz	13,339	99.37%	--Unopposed--			
Menominee–Shawano		William F. Kussel Jr.	2011	William F. Kussel Jr.	6,630	99.95%	--Unopposed--			
Milwaukee	8	William Sosnay	2000	William Sosnay	96,263	98.65%	--Unopposed--			
Milwaukee	14	Amber Raffeet August	2023	Amber Raffeet August	96,183	98.74%	--Unopposed--			
Milwaukee	17	Carolina Maria Stark	2012	Carolina Maria Stark	96,223	98.82%	--Unopposed--			
Milwaukee	18	Ronnie V. Murray II	2023	Ronnie V. Murray II	95,439	98.81%	--Unopposed--			
Milwaukee	20	Joseph R. Wall	2018	Joseph R. Wall	94,997	98.79%	--Unopposed--			
Milwaukee	23	Jorge Fragoso	2023	Jorge Fragoso	94,959	98.81%	--Unopposed--			
Milwaukee	24	Raphael Ramos	2023	Raphael Ramos	95,541	98.87%	--Unopposed--			
Milwaukee	28	Mark A. Sanders	2012	Mark A. Sanders	95,462	98.87%	--Unopposed--			
Milwaukee	38	Jeffrey A. Wagner	1988	Jeffrey A. Wagner	97,561	98.74%	--Unopposed--			
Milwaukee	39	Jane V. Carroll	2006	Jane V. Carroll	98,808	98.81%	--Unopposed--			
Milwaukee	43	Marshall B. Murray	1999	Marisabel Cabrera	61,625	50.99%	Rochelle N. Johnson-Bent	58,366	48.30%	
Milwaukee	46	Anderson Gansner	2023	Anderson Gansner	95,985	98.77%	--Unopposed--			
Monroe	3	Rick Radcliffe	2017	Rick Radcliffe	5,737	99.15%	--Unopposed--			
Oneida	2	Michael H. Bloom	2012	Mary M. Sowinski	6,834	66.78%	Michael Fugle	3,386	33.09	
Outagamie	5	Carrie Schneider	2017	Carrie Schneider	25,552	100.0%	--Unopposed--			
Price		Kevin G. Klein	2017	Mark T. Fuhr	2,639	100.0%	--Unopposed--			
Racine	1	Wynne P. Laufenberg	2016	Wynne P. Laufenberg	22,916	98.53%	--Unopposed--			
Racine	3	Toni L. Young	2023	Jessica Lynott	20,667	60.85%	Toni L. Young	13,216	38.91%	
Racine	9	Robert S. Repischak	2017	Robert S. Repischak	22,673	98.48%	--Unopposed--			
Racine	10	Timothy D. Boyle	2012	Timothy D. Boyle	23,418	98.84%	--Unopposed--			
Rock	3	Jeffrey S. Kuglitsch	2017	Jeffrey S. Kuglitsch	19,887	98.69%	--Unopposed--			
Rock	7	Barbara W. McCrory	2012	Barbara W. McCrory	20,527	98.84%	--Unopposed--			
Sauk	3	Patricia A. Barrett	2018	Blake J. Duren	6,558	51.30%	Nancy Thome	6,226	48.70%	
St. Croix	3	Scott R. Needham	1994	Scott R. Needham	15,042	99.07%				
Walworth	1	Phillip A. Koss	2012	Estee E. Scholtz	14,215	69.07%	Peter M. Navis	6,283	30.53%	James B. Duquette
Waukesha	2	Jennifer Dorow	2011	Jennifer Dorow	79,029	98.83%	--Unopposed--			
Waukesha	12	Laura Lau	2018	Jack A. Pitzo	70,211	98.93%	--Unopposed--			
Waupaca	3	Raymond S. Huber	2000	Raymond S. Huber	7,877	99.24%	--Unopposed--			
Winnebago	1	Teresa S. Basiliere	2018	Michael D. Rust	15,670	52.99%	LaKeisha D. Haase	13,876	46.92%	Eric R. Heywood
Wood	2	Nicholas J. Brazeau Jr.	2011	Nicholas J. Brazeau Jr.	11,678	96.85%	--Unopposed--			

=== Ballot measures ===
There were five amendments to the Constitution of Wisconsin voted on during 2024. The first two amendments were on the ballot for the Spring general election, April 2, 2024. Two other amendments were on the Fall primary ballot, on August 13, 2024. A final amendment is set to appear on the Fall general election ballot, on November 5, 2024. All five amendments were proposed by Republicans and passed through the legislature on roughly party-line votes. Both spring amendment votes succeeded. Both fall primary amendment votes failed. The fall general amendment vote succeeded.

Both spring amendments were part of ongoing Republican attempts to change the process of election administration, motivated by grievances and conspiracy theories about the conduct and outcome of the 2020 elections.

The fall primary amendments were part of the Republican legislature's campaign to restrict the powers of the Democratic governor, which began just after he won the 2018 election. These two amendments attempted to restrict the governor's authority over spending of state money. The manner of the fall amendment process was also noteworthy, with Republicans specifying that the ratification vote should occur on the fall primary ballot rather than the fall general election ballot. Historically, all prior Wisconsin constitutional amendment votes (both successful and unsuccessful) took place at a general election. According to some political figures, such as Ben Wikler, the fall amendments were placed in the August primary as Republicans hoped a lower turnout election would ensure their approval.

The fall general election question would alter the voting rights section of the Wisconsin Constitution, replacing the word "every" with the word "only" in the sentence "Every United States citizen age 18 or older who is a resident of an election district in this state is a qualified elector of that district."

==== Spring Question 1 ====
Question 1
- April 2, 2024
- Use of private funds in election administration. Shall section 7 (1) of article III of the constitution be created to provide that private donations and grants may not be applied for, accepted, expended, or used in connection with the conduct of any primary, election, or referendum?

Results
Choice	Votes	%
Yes	638,018	54.43%
No	534,126	45.57%
Total votes	1,172,144	100.00%
- County results Yes: 50–60% 60–70% 70–80% No: 50–60% 60–70%

The first constitutional amendment on the ballot in 2024 dealt with the issue of external funding to support election administration. This amendment was proposed by Republican legislators in response to the Mark Zuckerberg-backed nonprofit Center for Tech and Civic Life making 10 million dollars' worth of grants, spread across 100 Wisconsin municipalities and 38 Wisconsin counties to help those municipalities to pay election-related expenses for the 2020 elections. The amendment was ratified with 54% of the votes.

The question read:

Use of private funds in election administration. Shall section 7 (1) of article III of the constitution be created to provide that private donations and grants may not be applied for, accepted, expended, or used in connection with the conduct of any primary, election, or referendum?

===== Endorsements =====
Yes

Legislators

- Tyler August, state representative (since 2011); majority leader of the Wisconsin State Assembly (since 2023) (Republican)
- Eric Wimberger, state senator (since 2021) (Republican)

Parties

- Wisconsin Republican Party

Organizations

- Opportunity Solutions Project
- Wisconsin Institute for Law and Liberty
No

Parties

- Democratic Party of Wisconsin

Organizations

- American Civil Liberties Union of Wisconsin
- Common Cause Wisconsin
- League of Women Voters of Wisconsin
- Wisconsin Conservation Voters

==== Spring Question 2 ====
Question 2
- April 2, 2024
- Election officials. Shall section 7 (2) of article III of the constitution be created to provide that only election officials designated by law may perform tasks in the conduct of primaries, elections, and referendums?

Results
Choice	Votes	%
Yes	684,487	58.58%
No	483,946	41.42%
Total votes	1,168,433	100.00%
- County results Yes: 50–60% 60–70% 70–80% No: 50–60% 60–70%

The second constitutional amendment on the ballot in 2024 added language to restrict who is allowed to perform actions related to carrying out elections in Wisconsin. Wisconsin already had laws describing who is allowed to work as a poll worker or elections officers, but the ambiguous wording of the new amendment may have been intended to restrict any volunteer activities around election support that are not explicitly described by current law. The amendment was ratified with 58% of the votes.

The question read:

Election officials. Shall section 7 (2) of article III of the constitution be created to provide that only election officials designated by law may perform tasks in the conduct of primaries, elections, and referendums?

===== Endorsements =====
Yes

Legislators

- Tyler August, state representative (since 2011); majority leader of the Wisconsin State Assembly (since 2023) (Republican)
- Eric Wimberger, state senator (since 2021) (Republican)

Parties

- Wisconsin Republican Party

Organizations

- Opportunity Solutions Project
- Wisconsin Institute for Law and Liberty
No

Parties

- Democratic Party of Wisconsin

Organizations

- American Civil Liberties Union of Wisconsin
- Common Cause Wisconsin
- League of Women Voters of Wisconsin
- Wisconsin Conservation Voters

==== Fall Primary Question 1 ====
Question 1
- August 13, 2024
- Delegation of appropriation power. Shall section 35 (1) of article IV of the constitution be created to provide that the legislature may not delegate its sole power to determine how moneys shall be appropriated?

Results
Choice	Votes	%
Yes	521,538	42.55%
No	704,260	57.45%
Total votes	1,225,798	100.00%
- County results No: 50–60% 60–70% 70–80% 80–90% Yes: 50–60% 60–70%

The third constitutional amendment on the ballot in 2024 was intended to restrict the ability of the legislature to delegate any spending authority to other entities. Existing law where the legislature had previously delegated authority could have been invalidated by this amendment.

The question read:

Delegation of appropriation power. Shall section 35 (1) of article IV of the constitution be created to provide that the legislature may not delegate its sole power to determine how moneys shall be appropriated?

===== Endorsements =====
Yes

Legislators

- Dale Kooyenga, state senator (2019–2023) and state representative (2011–2019) (Republican)
- Howard Marklein, state senator (since 2015) and state representative (2011–2015) (Republican)
- Robert Wittke, state representative (since 2019) (Republican)

Organizations

- Badger Institute
- Wisconsin Institute for Law and Liberty
- Wisconsin Manufacturers & Commerce
No

Parties

- Democratic Party of Wisconsin

Statewide officials

- Tony Evers, governor (since 2019) (Democratic)

Legislators

- Brad Pfaff, state senator (since 2021) (Democratic)

Unions

- Wisconsin Education Association Council
- Wisconsin AFL-CIO

Organizations

- League of Women Voters of Wisconsin
- Wisconsin Conservation Voters

==== Fall Primary Question 2 ====
Question 2
- August 13, 2024
- Allocation of federal moneys. Shall section 35 (2) of article IV of the constitution be created to prohibit the governor from allocating any federal moneys the governor accepts on behalf of the state without the approval of the legislature by joint resolution or as provided by legislative rule?

Results
Choice	Votes	%
Yes	521,639	42.47%
No	706,637	57.53%
Total votes	1,228,276	100.00%
- County results No: 50–60% 60–70% 70–80% 80–90% Yes: 50–60% 60–70%

The fourth constitutional amendment on the ballot in 2024 was intended to prohibit the governor from spending money that the state received from the federal government without authorization from the state legislature. This was prompted by Republican discontent over the money Wisconsin received from President Biden's American Rescue Plan Act of 2021, Inflation Reduction Act, Infrastructure Investment and Jobs Act, and CHIPS and Science Act, which enabled Governor Evers to fund a number of projects without legislative approval.

The question read:

Allocation of federal moneys. Shall section 35 (2) of article IV of the constitution be created to prohibit the governor from allocating any federal moneys the governor accepts on behalf of the state without the approval of the legislature by joint resolution or as provided by legislative rule?

===== Endorsements =====
Yes

Legislators

- Dale Kooyenga, state senator (2019–2023) and state representative (2011–2019) (Republican)
- Howard Marklein, state senator (since 2015) and state representative (2011–2015) (Republican)
- Robert Wittke, state representative (since 2019) (Republican)

Organizations

- Badger Institute
- Wisconsin Institute for Law and Liberty
- Wisconsin Manufacturers & Commerce
No

Parties

- Democratic Party of Wisconsin

Statewide officials

- Tony Evers, governor (since 2019) (Democratic)

Legislators

- Brad Pfaff, state senator (since 2021) (Democratic)

Unions

- Wisconsin Education Association Council
- Wisconsin AFL-CIO

Organizations

- League of Women Voters of Wisconsin
- Wisconsin Conservation Voters

==== Fall General Question 1 ====
Question 1
- November 5, 2024
- Eligibility to vote. Shall section 1 of article III of the constitution, which deals with suffrage, be amended to provide that only a United States citizen age 18 or older who resides in an election district may vote in an election for national, state, or local office or at a statewide or local referendum?

Results
Choice	Votes	%
Yes	2,272,446	70.51%
No	950,445	29.49%
Total votes	3,222,891	100.00%
- County results Yes: 50–60% 60–70% 70–80% 80–90% No: 50–60%

The right to vote in Wisconsin is established in Section 1, Article III, of the state constitution, which says "Every United States citizen age 18 or older who is a resident of an election district in this state is a qualified elector of that district." The fifth constitutional amendment on the ballot in 2024 would alter the language of that section to delete the word "Every" and replace it with the words "Only a", then adding a list of election categories for which the restriction would apply. Under current state and federal law, it is already illegal for noncitizens to vote in any federal elections, and noncitizens who vote illegally could face imprisonment or deportation. According to nonpartisan experts, since non-citizen voting is already illegal, the amendment would have no immediate impact on Wisconsin elector qualifications.

Critics of amendments such as these have expressed concerns that they only further misinformation surrounding the prevalence of noncitizen voting in the United States. According to the Brennan Center, noncitizen voting is negligible, with only 0.0001% of votes in 2016 across 42 local jurisdictions. While measures are in place to ensure noncitizens are unable to register to vote. According to the League of Women Voters, the amendment would flip the meaning of Section 1 from guaranteeing citizens the right to vote to instead establishing limitations on which citizens can be extended the right to vote. The language change therefore could be used to further erode the voting rights of American citizens in the future.

The question reads:

Eligibility to vote. Shall section 1 of article III of the constitution, which deals with suffrage, be amended to provide that only a United States citizen age 18 or older who resides in an election district may vote in an election for national, state, or local office or at a statewide or local referendum?

== Local offices ==
=== County supervisor elections ===
There were regularly scheduled county board of supervisors elections in all of Wisconsin's 72 counties as part of the Spring general election, April 2, 2024. County supervisors are elected for two year terms, the number of seats per county varies.

=== District attorney elections ===
There were regularly scheduled district attorney elections in all of Wisconsin's 72 counties as part of the Fall general election, November 5, 2024. Only two counties saw a contested race for district attorney in the general election (Kenosha and Wood). Two others had a contested Republican primary but no general election opponent (Waukesha and Washington).

=== Dane County ===
==== Dane County executive ====
There was a special election for Dane County executive in 2024, concurrent with the Fall general election, November 5, 2024, due to the early resignation of incumbent executive Joe Parisi. State senator Melissa Agard won the special election to serve the remainder of the term expiring April 2025. Agard defeated county supervisor Dana Pellebon; two other candidates were eliminated in the nonpartisan primary: Madison city councilmember Regina Vidaver and Dane County director of equity and inclusion Wes Sparkman.

==== Verona Mayor ====
A regularly scheduled mayoral election was held in Verona, Wisconsin, at the Spring general election, April 2, 2024. Three-term incumbent, Luke Diaz, first elected in 2018, was re-elected unopposed with 98% of the vote, with the other 2% going to various write-in candidates.

=== Kenosha County ===
==== Kenosha mayor ====
A regularly scheduled mayoral election was held in Kenosha, Wisconsin, at the Spring general election, April 2, 2024. The six-term incumbent John Antaramian, did not run for a seventh four-year term. In the general election, longtime city councilmember David Bogdala was elected the 51st mayor of Kenosha, defeating city plan commissioner Lydia Spottswood. Seven other candidates also ran, but were eliminated in the February primary: city councilmember Kelly MacKay, former county board member Tony Garcia, Peace in the Streets director Gregory Bennett Jr., Racial and Ethnic Equity Commission member Elizabeth Garcia, social media content creator Koerri Elijah, activist Andreas Meyer, and retiree Mary Morgan.

==== Kenosha County district attorney ====
A regularly scheduled district attorney election was held in Kenosha County, at the Fall general election, November 5, 2024. The incumbent, Mike Graveley, did not run for re-election. In the general election, Republican attorney Xavier Solis defeated deputy district attorney Carli McNeill, running as a Democrat.

=== Marathon County ===
==== Wausau mayor ====
A regularly scheduled mayoral election was held in Wausau, Wisconsin, at the Spring general election, April 2, 2024. City councilmember Doug Diny was elected mayor, defeating the incumbent mayor Katie Rosenberg. Local agitator Christopher Wood also ran, but was eliminated in the February primary. Wood has been a controversial figure in Wausau, known for shouting anti-semitic rhetoric on the sidewalk outside of Wausau events.

=== Milwaukee County ===
==== Milwaukee mayor ====
A regularly scheduled mayoral election was held in Milwaukee, Wisconsin, at the Spring general election, April 2, 2024. The incumbent Cavalier Johnson, first elected in a 2022 special election, was elected to a full four-year term, defeating David King, founder of the Wisconsin God Squad. Activist and perennial candidate Ieshuh Griffin also ran, but was eliminated in the February primary.

==== Milwaukee County executive ====
A regularly scheduled county executive election was held in Milwaukee County, at the Spring general election, April 2, 2024. The incumbent David Crowley, first elected in 2020, was elected to a second four-year term. He defeated perennial candidate Ieshuh Griffin, who was also a candidate for mayor in 2024.

==== Milwaukee County district attorney ====
A regularly scheduled district attorney election was held in Milwaukee County, concurrent with the Fall general election, November 5, 2024. The 18-year incumbent, John T. Chisholm, did not run for re-election and retired at the end of this term. Only one candidate filed to appear on the ballot, Chisholm's deputy, Kent Lovern. Lovern was elected unopposed with 97% of the vote, with the other 3% going to various write-in candidates.

==== Milwaukee County treasurer ====
A regularly scheduled treasurer election was held in Milwaukee County, concurrent with the Fall general election, November 5, 2024. The 10-year Democratic incumbent, David Cullen ran for reelection and was challenged in the August 13 partisan primary by Ted Chisholm, former chief of staff of the Milwaukee County Sheriff's Office. Cullen defeated Chisholm with over 66% of the vote and was unopposed in the November 5 election.

==== Milwaukee city attorney ====
A regularly scheduled city attorney election was held in Milwaukee, Wisconsin, at the Spring general election, April 2, 2024. State representative Evan Goyke defeated incumbent city attorney Tearman Spencer.

==== Wauwatosa mayor ====
A regularly scheduled mayoral election was held in Wauwatosa, Wisconsin, at the Spring general election, April 2, 2024. The incumbent Dennis McBride, first elected in 2020, was elected to a second four-year term. He defeated city councilmember Andrew Meindl.

==== West Allis mayor ====
A regularly scheduled mayoral election was held in West Allis, Wisconsin, at the Spring general election, April 2, 2024. The incumbent Dan Devine, first elected in 2008, was elected to a fifth four-year term. He defeated former business owner Amy Rose Murphy.

==== Milwaukee Public Schools referendum ====
A referendum was held at the Spring general election, April 2, 2024, in which Milwaukee Public Schools sought $252 million increased funding by raising the property tax levy by $216 per $100,000 of property value. Milwaukee Public Schools stressed that the increased funding was needed to address a pending budget shortfall. The referendum faced significant opposition from Milwaukee's business community, but narrowly passed, with 51% voting in favor.

=== Outagamie County ===
==== Appleton mayor ====
A regularly scheduled mayoral election was held in Appleton, Wisconsin, at the Spring general election, April 2, 2024. The incumbent Jake Woodford, first elected in 2020, won a second four-year term without opposition.

==== Kaukauna mayor ====
A regularly scheduled mayoral election was held in Kaukauna, Wisconsin, at the Spring general election, April 2, 2024. Three-term incumbent Tony Penterman won his fourth two-year term without opposition.

=== Racine County ===
==== Racine County executive ====
There was a special election for Racine County executive on Thursday, December 19, 2024, due to the death of the previous officeholder, Jonathan Delagrave. Businessman Ralph Malicki won the special election to serve the remainder of the term expiring April 2027. Malicki defeated county clerk Wendy Christensen.

Two candidates were eliminated in the nonpartisan primary, held Thursday, November 21, 2024: city of Racine transit commissioner Lorenzo Santos and former Racine Unified School Board member Melvin Hargove. Two other candidates initially announced a run but did not make the ballot: Waterford village trustee Adam Jaskie and restaurateur Cory Sebastian.

==== Burlington mayor ====
A regularly scheduled mayoral election was held in Burlington, Wisconsin, at the Spring general election, April 2, 2024. Eight-term incumbent Jeannie Hefty did not run for a ninth two-year term. City councilmember Jon Schultz was elected mayor of Burlington, defeating fellow city councilmember Corina Kretschmer.

=== Waukesha County ===
==== Waukesha County district attorney ====
There was a regularly scheduled district attorney election in Waukesha County, concurrent with the Fall general election, November 5, 2024. The incumbent, Susan Opper, did not run for re-election and retired at the end of this term. Deputy district attorney Lesli Boese defeated deputy district attorney Mike Thurston in the Republican primary and was unopposed in the general election.

=== Winnebago County ===
==== Menasha mayor ====
A regularly scheduled mayoral election was held in Menasha, Wisconsin, at the Spring general election, April 2, 2024. Four-term incumbent Don Merkes did not run for a fifth four-year term. City councilmember Austin Hammond was elected mayor of Menasha, narrowly defeating fellow city councilmember Rebecca Nichols. Two other candidates also ran but were eliminated in the February primary: city council president Stan Sevenich and architectural intern Kyle Coenen.

== See also ==
- Elections in Wisconsin
- Clarke v. Wisconsin Elections Commission
- Bilingual elections requirement for Wisconsin (per Voting Rights Act Amendments of 2006)
- Political party strength in Wisconsin
