= Badger Institute =

Wisconsin-based free-market think tank

Coordinates: 43.0388°N 87.9200°W

- Formation: 1987
- Type: Nonprofit public policy think tank
- Purpose: Promote free market economic policies in Wisconsin
- Location: Milwaukee, Wisconsin
- President: Mike Nichols
- Chairman: Thomas J. Howatt
- Affiliations: State Policy Network
- Revenue: $867,318 (2024)
- Expenses: $1.2 million (2024)
- Website: www.badgerinstitute.org
- Formerly called: Wisconsin Policy Research Institute

The Badger Institute, formerly the Wisconsin Policy Research Institute, is a nonprofit policy research organization based in Milwaukee, Wisconsin. It supports free markets and limited government. It played a prominent role in the development of the state's school voucher program and has formulated recommendations for the state's higher education system.

== See also ==
- MacIver Institute
