= Tarren Bragdon =

American politician

Personal details
- Born: 1975 (age 50–51) Bangor, Maine, U.S.
- Party: Republican
- Spouse: Anna
- Children: 4
- Education: University of Maine (BS); Husson University (MS)

Tarren Bragdon (born 1975) is an American former state legislator and think tank founder. At age 21, Bragdon won a seat in the Maine House of Representatives and became the youngest state legislator ever elected in Maine. A Republican, Bragdon served in the Maine House from 1996 through 2000. After two terms in office, Bragdon declined to seek re-election, instead taking a job running the Maine Heritage Policy Center (MHPC). Bragdon headed MHPC, a conservative think tank, from 2008 through 2011.

In 2010, Bragdon was appointed as co-chair of newly elected Maine Governor Paul LePage's transition team. In 2011, Bragdon left Maine and moved to Naples, Florida, to found the Foundation for Government Accountability (FGA), a free market think tank. Bragdon serves as the group's president and CEO.
