= Regina Egea =

American politician

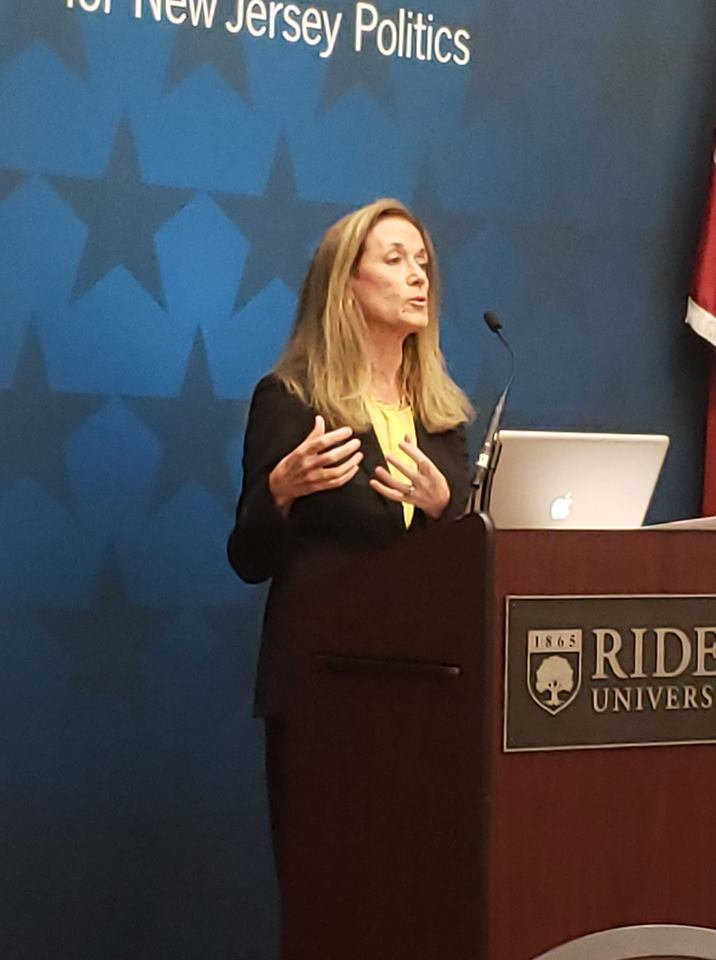
Regina Egea at Rider University

Regina M. Egea served as chief of staff to governor of New Jersey Chris Christie. She was appointed in December 2013 and resigned in April 2016. She is the president of Garden State Initiative, a public policy think tank based in Morristown, New Jersey, which was founded in 2017.

== Background ==
Egea is a native of Monmouth County and attended St. Rose High School. She graduated from Montclair State University with a bachelor's degree in business and managerial economics and holds a master's in Business Administration in Marketing from Fordham University and from the International Executive Program at the International Institute for Management Development. Egea was a Senior VP of AT&T.

From 2003 to 2008, Egea sat on the Harding Township, New Jersey Board of Education. While on the Board, she successfully conducted the search for a School Superintendent in 2007. In 2008 she was elected to the position of Committee Member in Harding Township (the only female member) and was Deputy Mayor from 2010 to 2011.

She supported the Jersey Battered Women's Shelter in 2013 and is a current member of the Board of Trustees of the Harding Kemmerer Library. She sat on the Harding Township Board of Education from 2004 to 2008.

== Christie administration ==
In 2009, Egea became policy adviser to the 2009 Christie campaign for governor. She became Chief of Staff to the State Treasurer Andrew Sidamon-Eristoff. In 2012, Egea became a member of Board of Trustees of the North Jersey Transportation Planning Authority. Egea became Director of the Authorities Unit of the Governor's Office. In December 2013, Christie chose her as chief of staff to replace Kevin O'Dowd, who he nominated to be the new state Attorney-General.

Egea became the subject of increasing media scrutiny in January 2014. and is one of several New Jersey state employees within the governor's administration who was subpoenaed by the New Jersey Legislature panel investigating the Fort Lee lane closure scandal. Egea, who had learned of the lane closures on September 13, 2013, after their reversal and later assisted Bill Baroni (former Deputy Executive Director of the Port Authority of New York and New Jersey) to prepare for his testimony for the same committee, was not accused of wrongdoing. She testified on July 17, 2014. Her testimony indicated that she had contact with the governor about the matter and had deleted numerous telephone text messages regarding it, but could not recall when she had done so. Phone records subpoenaed from AT&T show that there were 12 additional texts sent between Egea and Christie. An interim report by the state legislature said that the governor's office could not provide the content of any of the nine sent by Egea and three by the governor. The content of the texts remains controversial in trials related to the lane closures. In a June 2016 ruling, a federal judge said that the subpoena requests for Egea's phone records were too broad; the hearing did not clarify its whereabouts.

== Garden State Initiative ==
Egea is founder and president of the Garden State Initiative, a think tank addressing economic and fiscal matters in the state of New Jersey.

== See also ==
- Governorship of Chris Christie
- List of people involved in the Fort Lee lane closure scandal
