= Bluegrass Institute for Public Policy Solutions =

Libertarian think tank

- Abbreviation: BIPPS
- Formation: 2003
- Founder: Chris Derry
- Type: 501(c)(3)
- Headquarters: Bowling Green, Kentucky
- Chief Executive Officer: Caleb O. Brown
- President: Jim Waters
- Budget: Revenue: $287,000; Expenses: $138,000 (FYE December 2024)
- Website: bipps.org

The Bluegrass Institute for Public Policy Solutions (BIPPS) is a libertarian think tank based in Bowling Green, Kentucky. BIPPS is a member of the State Policy Network.

== Leadership ==
In May 2025, Caleb O. Brown was appointed as Chief Executive Officer of the Bluegrass Institute. Brown previously served as director of multimedia at the Cato Institute in Washington, D.C., where he hosted the Cato Daily Podcast for nearly 18 years, producing over 4,000 episodes. He holds a master's degree in economics from George Mason University.

Brown previously worked with the Bluegrass Institute in 2005, directing the KentuckyVotes.org project, which successfully convinced the Kentucky legislature to publish bill summaries and voting records online. He has also been involved in education policy advocacy, serving as a volunteer coordinator for the Kentucky School Choice Coalition from 2017 to 2025.

Jim Waters continues to serve as president of the organization.

== Activities ==
In 2005, BIPPS launched KentuckyVotes.org, a website which provides information about Kentucky General Assembly bills, amendments and roll-call votes. The website was launched after BIPPS successfully pushed the state's Legislative Research Commission to post legislative roll call votes online.

== Policy positions ==
=== Minimum wage ===
BIPPS has argued that an increase in the federal minimum wage would disproportionately harm Kentucky as well as young, low-skilled workers.

=== Education ===
The organization has cautioned against the use of certain performance testing ideas in public school assessment programs. BIPPS opposes the Common Core State Standards Initiative.

The organization advocates for school choice policies, including support for educational options such as school vouchers and charter schools.

=== Public pensions ===
The organization has blamed the Kentucky General Assembly for the state of Kentucky's public pensions, which are among the worst-funded in the country.
