= Yankee Institute for Public Policy =

American political think tank

- Established: 1984
- Chair: Daniel Gressel
- President: Carol Platt Liebau
- Budget: Revenue: $2.17 million Expenses: $2.54 million (FYE December 2023)
- Address: 216 Main Street Hartford, CT 06106
- Location: Hartford, Connecticut
- Coordinates: 41.7702°N 72.6617°W
- Interactive map of Yankee Institute for Public Policy
- Website: yankeeinstitute.org

The Yankee Institute for Public Policy is a conservative American think tank based in Hartford, Connecticut, that researches Connecticut public policy questions. Organized as a 501(c)(3), the group's stated mission is to "develop and advocate for free market, limited government public policy solutions in Connecticut." Yankee was founded in 1984 by Bernard Zimmern, a French entrepreneur who was living in Norwalk, Connecticut, and professor Gerald Gunderson of Trinity College. The organization is a member of the State Policy Network.

In April 2022, the Yankee Institute launched Connecticut Inside Investigator, a non-profit investigative journalism outlet.

== Public policy research ==
=== Tax and budget ===
The Yankee Institute has had a historic focus on Connecticut's tax and budget issues. In 1991, during the debate over the adoption of a state income tax, it published A Connecticut Assessment of State Income Taxation: Fueling the Government, Stalling the Economy by Thomas Dye, a professor at Florida State University, about the likely impact of an income tax on the state's economic growth.

The 2010 Yankee publication Connecticut Taxes and Fees was highlighted by the Hartford Courant as "a look at how many ways the government collects money from the citizens it serves."

The Yankee Institute has come into conflict with labor unions on multiple occasions. The group gained increased attention in the early 2010s for its criticism of labor unions representing government employees. During this time, the think tank was subject to a failed lawsuit alleging that it had interfered with public sector union's contract negotiations.

=== Government transparency ===
Government accountability and transparency research have emerged as key areas of interest for the Yankee Institute. In 2010, the organization launched the Connecticut Sunlight Project to monitor government spending. The CT Sunlight Project was expanded during the summer of 2010 to include payroll and pension data for local governments and school districts in Connecticut.

In July 2010, the Yankee Institute launched the investigative reporting project Raising Hale to "uncover wasteful government spending" and "expose government corruption and abuse."

=== Education ===
Education research has been a signature issue for the Yankee Institute starting with its organization of a conference on school choice at Trinity College in 1988. The organization has published numerous studies on the topic, including the December 2007 Ending Corruption and Waste in Your Public School by Dr. Armand Fusco, a retired superintendent of schools from the town of Branford, the report Free College for High School Students by Dr. Lewis Andrews, and the June 2009 How to Reduce Property Taxes with a Citizens' Audit Committee by Dr. Armand Fusco and Dr. Lewis Andrews. The think tank gained attention in 2004 when it proposed that the state pay high school students to graduate early, which it said would save the state money.

=== Government administration and elections reform ===
Yankee research has delved into reforms of the state's campaign finance laws. The Yankee Institute published Slanting the Playing Field: Connecticut's Flawed Publicly-Financed Campaign System detailing the policy flaws in Connecticut's Citizens' Election Program, a publicly funded alternative campaign financing system available to candidates for state offices.

The Yankee Institute filed an amicus brief in the U.S. Supreme Court case Arizona Free Enterprise Club's Freedom Club PAC v. Bennett in November 2010.

=== Transportation ===
The Yankee Institute has argued against the phasing out of internal combustion engine vehicle sales. In its arguments, it has highlighted the role of child labor in the supply chain of electric vehicles, the use of "energy-intensive machinery which runs on various forms of petroleum", and the role of China in the manufacturing of many electric vehicles.
