= St. Rose High School =

Catholic high school in Monmouth County, New Jersey, US

Location
- 607 7th Avenue; Belmar, Monmouth County, New Jersey 07719; United States; 40°10′54″N 74°01′25″W

Information
- Type: Private, Coeducational
- Religious affiliation: Catholic
- Established: 1923
- Oversight: Diocese of Trenton
- Superintendent: Vincent de Paul Schmidt
- NCES School ID: 00866851
- Principal: Robert Dougherty
- Faculty: 40.6 FTEs
- Grades: 9–12
- Enrollment: 394 (as of 2023–24)
- Student to teacher ratio: 9.7:1
- Colors: Purple; Gold
- Athletics conference: Shore Conference
- Team name: Purple Roses
- Accreditation: AdvancED
- Tuition: $14,400 (2023–24)
- Website: www.srhsnj.com

St. Rose High School is a four-year coeducational Catholic college-preparatory school located in Belmar, New Jersey. The school operates under the leadership of the Roman Catholic Diocese of Trenton and is affiliated with the Parish of St. Rose and the Sisters of St. Joseph. Founded in 1923, the school offers a faith-based academic curriculum that emphasizes Catholic and civic responsibility, creativity, and technical competence.

St. Rose High School serves students in grades 9–12 and draws from over 30 communities across the Monmouth, Ocean, and Middlesex counties.

As of the 2023–24 school year, the school had an enrollment of 394 students and 40.6 classroom teachers (on an FTE basis), for a student–teacher ratio of 9.7:1. The school's student body was 86.8% (342) White, 4.6% (18) Black, 3.8% (15) Hispanic and 2.5% (10) two or more races and 2.3% (9) Asian.

St. Rose High School is accredited by AdvancED and is a member of the National Catholic Educational Association (NCEA).

== History ==
St. Rose High School was established in 1923 by the Parish of St. Rose and the Sisters of St. Joseph, under the auspices of the Roman Catholic Diocese of Trenton. The school initially operated from a two-story brick building at 8th Avenue and E Street in Belmar, known locally as "the red brick." It enrolled 34 students in its inaugural freshman class, and the first graduating class completed their studies in 1927.

During the 1950s, under the leadership of Monsignor Teston, the school began transitioning to its current campus at 7th Avenue. Construction continued into the 1960s to accommodate increased enrollment.

In 1980, a fire severely damaged the gymnasium area, prompting the construction of new athletic facilities and administrative offices.

In the 1990s, benefactors Edward Brown and Richard Schulz donated land in Wall Township, enabling the school to expand its outdoor athletic complex.

On October 29, 2012, Hurricane Sandy caused extensive flooding in Belmar. St. Rose High School suffered major damage, including the destruction of its first floor and basement. The school community organized recovery and renovation efforts to restore full operations in the months that followed.

In 2023, St. Rose celebrated its centennial anniversary, marking 100 years of Catholic education and service to the Belmar community.

== Academics ==
St. Rose High School offers a college preparatory curriculum accredited by AdvancED and the Middle States Association of Colleges and Schools. The school provides a range of Advanced Placement (AP) and honors-level courses in subjects including English, mathematics, science, social studies, and world languages.

In addition to traditional coursework, the school encourages individualized instruction and student achievement through small class sizes, with a student–teacher ratio of 9.8:1.

Standardized test scores at St. Rose High School are above the 2023 national averages of 1028 for the SAT and 19.5 for the ACT. The average SAT score for St. Rose students is 1190, and the average ACT score is 27. The average GPA is 3.74, and approximately 92% of graduates pursue four-year college degrees. 99% of graduates pursue post-secondary education, and the school emphasizes college counseling and scholarship support.

== Extracurricular activities ==
St. Rose High School offers extracurricular clubs and activities beyond the classroom as well. Students participate in organizations such as the student government, National Honor Society, Campus Ministry, Model United Nations, and service-learning clubs.

The school also has a tradition in the performing arts, with student opportunities in choir, drama productions, and visual arts showcases. Publications include the school newspaper, literary magazine, and a yearbook that documents student life throughout the year.

Athletics are an important component of student life, with participation in the Shore Conference under the New Jersey State Interscholastic Athletic Association (NJSIAA).

== School rankings ==
According to Niche's 2025 rankings, St. Rose High School holds the following positions:

- #45 Best Catholic High Schools in New Jersey
- #65 Best High Schools for Athletes in New Jersey
- #93 Best Private High Schools in New Jersey
- #104 Best College Prep Private High Schools in New Jersey
- #298 Best High Schools for STEM in New Jersey
- #7 Best Private High Schools in Monmouth County
- #9 Best High Schools for Athletes in Monmouth County
- #32 Best High Schools for STEM in Monmouth County

== Athletics ==
The St. Rose High School Purple Roses compete in Division A Central of the Shore Conference, an athletic conference comprised of public and private high schools in Monmouth and Ocean counties along the Jersey Shore. The league operates under the jurisdiction of the New Jersey State Interscholastic Athletic Association (NJSIAA). With 339 students in grades 10–12, the school was classified by the NJSIAA for the 2019–20 school year as Non-Public B for most athletic competition purposes, which included schools with an enrollment of 37 to 366 students in that grade range (equivalent to Group II for public schools).

The school participates as the host school/lead agency in a joint ice hockey team with Donovan Catholic High School and Red Bank Catholic High School. The co-op program operated under agreements that expired at the end of the 2023–24 school year.

The school was recognized by the NJSIAA as the Group B winner of the Seventh Annual ShopRite Cup in 2009–10, based on the overall performances of the school's athletic teams which included first-place finishes in boys' cross country, boys' indoor track and field, girls' outdoor track and field and boys' outdoor track and field; second place in boys' soccer, third in girls' indoor track and field and baseball (tied), and fourth in boys' golf, plus bonus points for having no disqualifications for the fall season. The school was Group B winner of the ShopRite Cup for 2010–11, awarded for first-place finishes in girls' soccer and boys' soccer, second in boys' indoor group track and field, third in boys' cross country, girls' basketball (tied), girls' indoor group track and field, boys' outdoor track & field and boys' tennis (tied), and fourth in boys' golf plus bonus points for having no disqualifications for the fall and spring seasons.

The baseball team won the Non-Public Group C state championship in 1973 (defeating St. Patrick's High School in the tournament final), and won the Non-Public B state title in 1992 (vs. Essex Catholic High School), 2005 (vs. Morristown-Beard School), 2008 (vs. St. Mary High School of Rutherford) and 2009 (vs. Montclair Kimberley Academy). With three runs scored in the sixth inning, the 1973 team came back from a 1–0 deficit to finish the season with a 12–5 record after defeating St. Patrick's by a score of 3–2 in the Parochial C championship game. In 1992, the team finished with a 23–4 record after defeating Essex Catholic by a score of 12–4 in the Parochial C championship game. The 2005 team won the South Jersey Non-Public B state sectional title with a 10–3 win over St. Joseph High School of Hammonton, with nine of the runs coming with two outs in the sixth inning. The 2005 team won the Non-Public B state championship over Morristown-Beard School by a score of 4–0, with pitcher Anthony Ranaudo throwing a complete game two-hitter and hitting a first-inning three-run home run that gave St. Rose all the runs it needed. The 2008 team won the Non-Public B title with an 8–4 win in the finals against St. Mary's.

=== Boys' basketball ===
The St. Rose boys' basketball team has a long and successful history, capturing the Non-Public Group B state championship six times: in 1949 (defeating Immaculate Conception of Montclair), 1962 (again vs. Immaculate Conception), 1963 (vs. Phillipsburg Catholic), 1966 and 1977 (both vs. Our Lady of the Valley High School), and most recently in 2024 with a 73–29 win over Immaculate Conception of Montclair.

The 1962 championship team was led by future Duke University and ABA/NBA standout Bob Verga, who scored 26 points in a 63–61 victory over Immaculate Conception. Verga went on to score a then-state record 1,033 points in his senior season, leading the Purple Roses to another state title in 1963, where he hit the winning shot in an 82–80 win against Phillipsburg Catholic despite being triple-teamed.

St. Rose has also been successful in sectional tournaments. The team won the Parochial South B sectional in 2002 with a 67–46 win over Wildwood Catholic High School and again in 2004, winning 58–46 against Wildwood Catholic. In 2023, the team captured its first sectional title in 19 years, defeating Bishop Eustace Preparatory School by a score of 59–43 to win the Non-Public B South crown.

The boys' cross country team won the Non-Public Group B state championship in 1967, 1969, 1988, 2000, 2001, 2009, and 2022. The boys' cross country team was the subject of the 2007 book God on the Starting Line: The Triumph of a Catholic School Running Team and Its Jewish Coach by Marc Bloom.

=== Boys' soccer ===
The St. Rose High School boys' soccer team has one of the most successful programs in New Jersey history, winning 10 state championships—a total tied for fifth-most in the state.

The team won the Non-Public C state title in 1973, defeating St. Cecilia High School. In the Non-Public B classification, the Purple Roses captured championships in 1975 (vs. Don Bosco Preparatory High School), 1977 and 1978 (both vs. Paterson Catholic High School), and 1988 (vs. St. Benedict's Preparatory School). In the higher Non-Public A classification, the team won titles in 1981 (vs. Delbarton School), 1985 (vs. Bergen Catholic High School), and 1986 (vs. Don Bosco). The program most recently won the Non-Public B title in 2010, defeating Oratory Preparatory School.

The 1977 team finished the season with a 17–2–1 record after a 6–3 victory over Paterson Catholic in the championship match. The win gave St. Rose its third Parochial B title in five years.

In 1981, the Purple Roses defeated Delbarton 2–0 in the Non-Public A final to finish 21–2–1 under head coach Joe Donahue. Donahue, who had previously led the team to a title in 1978 at the age of 22, became one of the youngest coaches to win multiple state championships.

The team also won sectional titles, including the 2002 South Parochial B state sectional championship with a 5–0 shutout over Wildwood Catholic High School. In 2022, St. Rose claimed the Non-Public B South title once again by defeating Bishop Eustace in a penalty shootout (5–3) after a goalless draw in regulation and extra time.

=== Girls' basketball ===
The St. Rose High School girls' basketball team has one of the most decorated programs in New Jersey, with 12 state championships—ranked second-most in the state.

The team won back-to-back Group II state titles in 1976 (vs. Lyndhurst High School) and 1977 (vs. Union Catholic Regional High School). The 1977 squad finished the season with a 29–1 record and secured the state title with a dominant 58–36 win over Union Catholic, holding them without a field goal for a 16-minute stretch.

St. Rose later transitioned to Non-Public competition, winning Group A championships in 1983 (vs. Paramus Catholic High School), and three times over Immaculate Heart Academy in 2012, 2018, and 2019. The team also captured Group B titles in 1993 (vs. DePaul Catholic High School), 1998 and 2000 (both vs. Marist High School of Bayonne), 2014 (vs. Morris Catholic High School), and 2015 (vs. Immaculate Conception High School of Lodi).

The 1993 championship win was highlighted by a second-half surge led by Mannion, resulting in a 66–48 win over DePaul. In the 2000 postseason, St. Rose defeated Sacred Heart High School 66–40 to win the South Parochial B sectional title. The 2004 team also won the South B sectional, topping Holy Spirit High School by a score of 47–36.

=== Girls' tennis ===
The girls' tennis team won the Non-Public B state championship in 1984, defeating Pope John XXIII High School in the final match of the tournament. In 2000, the team captured the South B sectional state championship with a 4–1 win against Sacred Heart High School.

=== Girls' cross country ===
The girls' cross country team won the Non-Public Group B state championship five times: in 1993, 1997, 1998, 1999, and 2007.

=== Girls' track ===
The girls' indoor/winter track team won the Non-Public Group B state championship in 2013. The team also shared the Non-Public B indoor relay title in 2013 and won it outright again in 2022.

The girls' spring/outdoor track and field team won the Non-Public Group B state championship in 1998. The girls' soccer team won the Non-Public Group B state championship in 2010, defeating runner-up Morris Catholic High School in the finals.

=== Boys' track ===
The boys' track team won the Non-Public Group B spring / outdoor track state championship in 2010, 2016, 2022 and 2023.

The boys' team won the Non-Public Group B title in 2022.

The boys' track team won the winter / indoor state championship in 2010. The boys team won the indoor-relay Non-Public Group B state championship in 2022.

The boys' bowling team won the Group I state championship in 2018.

== Rivalries ==
St. Rose High School has developed several athletic and cultural rivalries, most notably with other Catholic and Shore Conference schools in Monmouth and Ocean counties. These rivalries are characterized not only by their competitiveness on the field or court, but also by strong fan support and the proximity of the schools, many of which recruit from the same parishes and youth sports programs. A prominent rivalry exists with Red Bank Catholic High School and Saint John Vianney High School, especially in girls' basketball and softball, where all three programs have historically competed at a high level in state tournaments.

The school also shares a long-standing local rivalry with Manasquan High School, particularly in basketball and soccer, with games between the Purple Roses and the Warriors drawing large community interest and media attention.

== Notable alumni ==
- Nicole Atkins (born 1978), singer
- Bill Carmody (born 1951), college basketball coach
- Regina Egea, Chief of Staff to Governor Chris Christie
- Marlene Lynch Ford (born 1954, class of 1972), politician, prosecutor and jurist who served in the New Jersey General Assembly from 1984 to 1992
- Tim Hauser (1941-2014), founding member of pop-jazz quartet The Manhattan Transfer
- Ken Lolla (born c. 1962, class of 1980), former head coach of the Louisville Cardinals men's soccer team, author and speaker who was a 1980 High School All-American for St. Rose
- Tom McGowan (born 1959), actor
- Michael O'Hearn (born 2001) para-alpine skier who represented the United States at the 2026 Winter Paralympics in para-alpine skiing
- Anthony Ranaudo (born 1989), MLB pitcher for the Texas Rangers
- Bob Sykes (born 1954), baseball pitcher who played in MLB for the Detroit Tigers and St. Louis Cardinals
- Bob Verga (born 1945), former professional basketball player
- Tommy West (1942–2021), record producer and singer-songwriter who co-founded The Criterions with Tim Hauser, a predecessor to The Manhattan Transfer
