= Carol Platt Liebau =

American lawyer

- Occupations: Attorney and social commentator
- Known for: Yankee Institute for Public Policy
- Notable work: Prude: How the Sex-Obsessed Culture Damages Girls (and America, Too!)

Carol Platt Liebau is president of the Yankee Institute for Public Policy. She is also an attorney, political analyst, and conservative commentator. Her book Prude: How the Sex-Obsessed Culture Damages Girls (and America, Too!) was published in 2007.

== Education ==
A native of St. Louis, Missouri, Liebau attended Princeton University and later attended Harvard Law School where she was managing editor of the Harvard Law Review.

== Personal life ==
She lives in the New York metropolitan area with her husband, Jack.
