= Garden State Initiative =

American research organization

- Established: 2017
- Type: Research and educational think tank
- Legal status: Non-profit
- Purpose: Public policy reform advocacy
- Headquarters: Morristown, New Jersey, U.S.
- President and founder: Regina M. Egea
- Website: gardenstateinitiative.org

The Garden State Initiative (GSI) is a Morristown, New Jersey–based research and educational organization. GSI conducts original research and provides regular analysis and commentary on issues and events impacting the state. It is a regular member of State Policy Network.

== Leadership and founding ==
Founded in 2017, GSI is “devoted to providing research-based answers to fiscal and economic issues” facing the state of New Jersey. GSI's founder and current president is Regina M. Egea, who, after a 30-year career in the private sector, served in several high-level positions in the administration of New Jersey Governor Chris Christie, including as chief of staff.

== Purpose and mission ==
GSI is focused on finding policy solutions that would “build a sustainable and effective economic infrastructure that supports jobs and retains valued workers,” according to New Jersey Monthly magazine. It also studies issues related to the state's workforce, such as how to attract and retain young professional workers, how to address high tuition rates at New Jersey colleges and universities, and how to use the state's Transportation Trust Fund to ultimately grow the state's economy. The group believes that the state of New Jersey must change the fundamentals of its economic policies, specifically by addressing tax policy, for example.

GSI works with other business organizations in the state, such as the New Jersey Business & Industry Association and the Commerce & Industry Association of New Jersey. However, GSI is careful to clarify that it “does not advocate for business,” according to Egea, and does not accept donations from private companies.

== Policy advocacy ==
Central to GSI's campaign for reforms in New Jersey's tax and economic policies is the argument that the state is performing poorly on key economic indicators, according to Egea. For example, between March and August 2019, the state with the highest number of job losses in the finance industry was New Jersey, which lost 7,700 full-time jobs. In a September 2019 op-ed in The Star-Ledger, Egea wrote: “A leading indicator of the lagging state of New Jersey’s economy was the July release of Q1 2019 Gross Domestic Product data from the U.S. Bureau of Economic Analysis. While the national economy reported a strong 3.1% rate, New Jersey reported a rate of 1.8% placing us tied for dead last among mainland U.S. states. And versus our near-neighbors? We trailed far behind other states in the region including less than half the growth rate of Delaware (3.9%) and New York (3.8%). And Pennsylvania at 2.9% was more than 1% above New Jersey’s performance.”

== History ==
In October 2017, the organization issued its first research report "Connecticut's Fiscal Crisis Is a Cautionary Tale for New Jersey" in collaboration with Manhattan Institute. The report was the basis for an op-ed that Egea co-authored with Stephen Eide of the Manhattan Institute that appeared in The Wall Street Journal.

In the spring of 2018, GSI issued its second research report, "New Jersey's Business Tax Competitiveness: Modelling the Prospects for Growth" with research by Ernst & Young which headlined the group's first ever Economic Policy Forum, which featured a bipartisan lineup including famed economist Dr. Arthur Laffer, James Freeman of the Wall Street Journal editorial board and former New York State Tax Commissioner Dr. James Wetzler discussion the state of the U.S. economy and a second panel focused on New Jersey's economic outlook which featured Senator Steve Oroho (R), Assembly Majority Leader Lou Greenwald (D), former State Democratic Party and New Jersey State Investment Council Chairman Tom Byrne and Dan Geltrude, CPA. In the spring of 2018, GSI issued its second research report, "New Jersey's Business Tax Competitiveness: Modeling the Prospects for Growth," with research by Ernst & Young which headlined the group's first economic policy forum, which featured a bipartisan lineup of current and former public officials and thought leaders. GSI holds its economic policy forum every year. While there are more Republican lawmakers in the state who are aligned with GSI than there are Democrats, GSI's goals are shared by some state Democratic leaders. For example, at its second annual forum in May 2019 (moderated by PBS-NJTV), the Democratic leader of the state Senate, Steve Sweeney, was a guest speaker, who spoke in support of reducing state taxes and regulations.

In January 2019, GSI published and released a report called “Adding It All Up.” GSI found, obtained, analyzed, and then added up the budgets of over 1,000 government agencies inside New Jersey. As a result, the report indicated that “governments in New Jersey are raising more than $86 billion annually from taxes, fees and other revenues” (excluding the Port Authority of New York and New Jersey and some other bi-state agencies). Spotlight New Jersey summed it up like this:

“The group’s first report issued late last month, offered a first-of-its-kind calculation of all the revenue being collected in New Jersey by governments at every level. (The total is $121 billion, according to GSI.)”

Subsequent reports focused on the potential to save $200 million annually on the cost of student transportation and a pathway to $2 billion in savings on the cost of the state's roads and bridges.

GSI joined the group Fair Property Taxes for All New Jersey (FPTFANJ) in hosting a public town hall in September 2019 that focused on affordability issues, property taxes, and the state's economy.

In November 2019, GSI teamed with Fairleigh Dickinson University's School of Public & Global Affairs to commission a public opinion survey to ask New Jersey residents about whether they were considering leaving the state and what the key drivers of the decision would be. The poll found that 44% of New Jersey residents are considering leaving the state in the not so distant future with more than 1 in 4 (28%) planning to depart the Garden State within five years. Property Taxes and the overall Cost of Living were cited as the main drivers.

== See also ==
- Corporate tax in the United States
- Economy of New Jersey
- Fuel taxes in the United States
- Income tax in the United States
- Property tax in the United States
- Think tank
