= Indiana Policy Review Foundation =

Free market think tank

- Established: 1989
- Founder: Charles S. Quilhot and Byron S. Lamm
- Type: Nonprofit 501(c)(3)
- Purpose: Expanding free-market principles in Indiana
- Location: Fort Wayne, Indiana, U.S.
- Region served: Indiana
- Executive Director: T. Craig Ladwig
- Revenue: $95,865 (2016)
- Expenses: $89,189 (2016)
- Website: www.inpolicy.org

The Indiana Policy Review Foundation (IPR) is an Indiana fusion conservative and libertarian, free market think tank. According to its web site, the IPR's mission is to "marshal the best thought on governmental, economic and educational issues at the state and municipal level." The IPR publishes the Indiana Policy Review. Based in Fort Wayne, Indiana, it is a non-profit, tax-exempt organization.

IPR is a member of the State Policy Network, an umbrella organization of conservative and libertarian think tanks operating at the state level.

== History ==
IPR was co-founded by its board chairman, Charles S. Quilhot, editor, T. Craig Ladwig, Stephen E. Williams and Byron S. Lamm, in 1989. U.S. vice president and former Indiana governor Mike Pence was its president from 1991 to 1994,

In a speech to The Heritage Foundation in 2008, then Representative Mike Pence said, "I was part of what we called the seed corn Heritage Foundation was spreading around the country in the state think tank movement. We actually called our little foundation in Indiana the Indiana Policy Review Foundation, very much as a homage to Policy Review magazine of Heritage, and we modeled on the state level what Heritage had done before."

== Policy positions ==
The institute supports policy positions rooted in individual liberty, personal responsibility, private property rights, free-market principles, and limited government. It explicitly does not address social issues often identified with modern conservatism.

== Organization and activities ==
The Indiana Policy Review Foundation publishes the Indiana Policy Review, a quarterly journal to promote IPR's mission "to marshal the best thought on governmental, economic and educational issues at the state and municipal levels."

IPR's staff and scholars supply columns to newspapers throughout the state. Staff and scholars also conduct research on a range of public policy issues and offer analysis and proposals through reports and publications to public servants, citizens, and the media.

Adjunct scholars

- Joshua Claybourn
