= Empire Center for Public Policy =

American nonprofit organization

- Formation: 2005
- Founder: Manhattan Institute for Policy Research
- Type: Nonprofit public policy research
- Headquarters: Albany, New York
- President: Zilvinas Silenas
- Budget: Revenue: $1.02 million Expenses: $754,000,000 (FYE September 2025)
- Staff: 12 (2025)
- Volunteers: 6 (2024)
- Website: www.empirecenter.org

The Empire Center for Public Policy is a fiscally conservative think tank and government watchdog group based in Albany, New York.

== History ==
The Empire Center was founded in 2005 as a project of the Manhattan Institute for Policy Research. In 2013, the Empire Center was spun off from the Manhattan Institute, becoming an independent nonprofit organization. The Center's stated mission is to "Make New York a better place to live and work by promoting public policy reforms grounded in free-market principles, personal responsibility, and the ideals of effective and accountable government." The Empire Center is a member of the State Policy Network.

== Policy areas ==
=== State budget ===
Empire engages in policy regarding New York state's spending and budget. Empire releases data regarding salaries and pensions of state employees and its impact on the state's budget. In 2018 Empire issued a report showing that over 3,500 state employees are paid more than Governor Cuomo's salary of $179,000. An Empire report disclosed that over 3,800 former state employees were paid annual pensions of more than $100,000 in 2016-2017, up 18% from the previous year. A 2016 Empire report highlighted excessive spending in education, such as 32 New York City educators who receive more than $200,000 a year in pay, including one employee who received a salary over $200,000 while also receiving a pension over $200,000 per year.

=== Healthcare ===
Empire's healthcare policy department regularly issues commentary, reports, and studies regarding healthcare reform and the state's healthcare budget. The state has seen Medicaid costs surging, contributing to a several billion dollar budget deficit. In 2017 Empire issued a report on possible misdirection of the state's Indigent Care Pool, with private hospitals serving primarily non-indigent patients receiving substantial grants from the pool over hospitals serving primarily indigent patients.

=== Transparency ===
Empire operates the website SeeThroughNY.net, a searchable database of employee payroll information for all public employees in the state, as well as pension, school and municipal union contracts, tax rates, and pork-barrel projects in the state. The website includes information comparing property tax rates, taxes paid, and share of public debt per resident across the state. Empire also tracks trends of population growth and loss in the state, including where former New York residents move to when they leave the state.

Empire sued the New York City Police Pension Fund for refusing to disclose names of former employees receiving pensions as required by the Freedom of Information Law. The court ruled that the names must be disclosed except for undercover police officers. The court found the disclosure of pensioners names helps to greater accountability and reduces pensioners double dipping, retiring to draw a pension while also working and receiving a full salary. The Pension Fund was also required to pay Empire's legal fees.

==== MTA overtime controversy ====
Through Empire's transparency efforts, overtime abuse in the Metropolitan Transit Authority (MTA) was uncovered. Empire discovered that MTA's payroll grew by $418 million in 2018, a large portion of which was from a $119 million increase in overtime. $145 million alone was spent on overtime from the Subway Action Plan. Additionally, 256 employees earned more than $250,000 in 2018, up from only 150 employees the year before. It was discovered that employees were falsifying time records, some even reporting more hours than is physically possible to work. One employee reported 74 hours of overtime alone per week and was paid over $450,000 for the year. Some Long Island Rail Road (LIRR) employees were using handwritten time records instead of electronic systems, which are easier to track and prevent abuse. MTA had no reliable system for verifying hours worked. In order to control the excessive overtime, the MTA briefly deployed police officers to take attendance and oversee overtime of LIRR employees, which was met with outrage from union officials but defended by Governor Cuomo. The controversy resulted in a federal probe and MTA Inspector General Barry Kluger stepping down from his post.
