= MacIver Institute =

Wisconsin-based conservative think tank

John K. MacIver Institute for Public Policy
- Formation: 2008; 18 years ago
- Type: Nonprofit
- Tax ID no.: 26-2639114
- Location(s): 44 E Mifflin, Suite 404; Madison, Wisconsin 53703
- Coordinates: 43.0764°N 89.3846°W
- Chief executive officer: Annette Olson
- Revenue: $792,966 (2025)
- Expenses: $858,633 (2025)
- Website: www.maciverinstitute.com

The John K. MacIver Institute for Public Policy is a Wisconsin-based conservative think tank. According to the organization, the MacIver Institute promotes free markets, individual freedom, personal responsibility, and limited government. It is a member of the State Policy Network.

== Personnel and funding ==
One of the MacIver Institute's primary donors is the Bradley Foundation. As of November 2014, the Bradley Foundation had given the MacIver Institute $890,000 since the MacIver Institute's 2008 launch.

== Activities ==
In 2011, the MacIver Institute and Americans for Prosperity purchased more than $500,000 worth of television ads in Wisconsin supporting Scott Walker's budget proposals.

In 2014, a Wisconsin appeals court sided with the MacIver Institute, ruling that Democratic State Senator Jon Erpenbach must turn over 2,600 emails sent to him during the political battle over Scott Walker's 2011 Wisconsin Act 10.
