= League of Women Voters of Wisconsin =

Voter education and advocacy organization

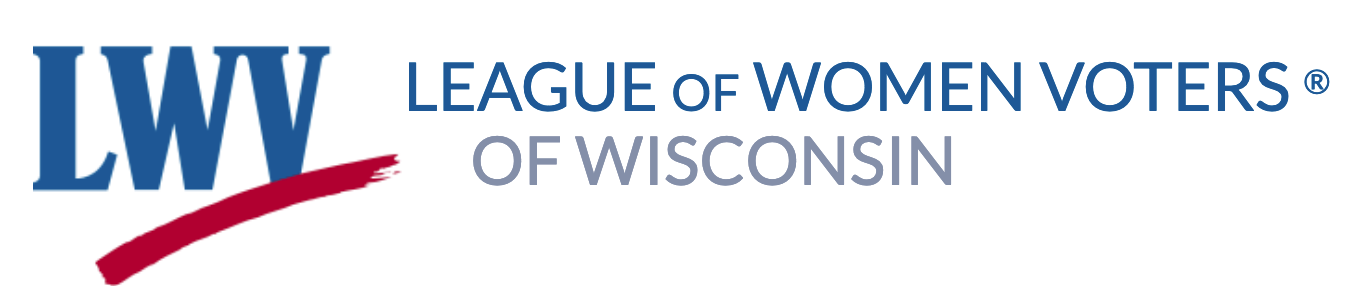
- Type: Nonprofit
- Purpose: Empowering Voters. Defending Democracy.
- Region served: Wisconsin
- Website: Official

The League of Women Voters of Wisconsin is the Wisconsin state chapter of the League of Women Voters.

== Voting and democracy work ==
=== Legislature's attempts to increase its power ===
In March 2019, the league won a lawsuit to block the passage of laws during a lame-duck session to strip incoming democratic governor Tony Evers of power before he took office, arguing that the "extraordinary session" was done in violation of the constitution. The Wisconsin Supreme Court in 4-3 ruling, overturned that decision in June 2021, restoring the curbs to the governor's power made by the legislature.

The chapter has also opposed proposed 2024 refendum to further weaken the power of the governor to spend federal money.

=== Redistricting ===
The League has been pushing for redistricting reform in Wisconsin for decades, and started partnering with Common Cause in Wisconsin and the Democracy Campaign in 2012 to push for change.

=== Voter ID Laws ===
The League also sued the state over its Voter ID laws, winning an injunction in 2012 against the requirement.

=== Voter purges ===
The league has also filed legal briefs disputing the legality of some of the voter purges in Wisconsin, arguing 7% of the people should not have been on the purge list. The group also increased education efforts around the purge to help make sure voters know how to check their registration status.

== History ==
Jessie Jack Hooper was the first president of the Wisconsin League of Women Voters in 1920. The chapter carried the maxim "every woman an intelligent voter," and Hooper served two terms as its first president.

== See also ==
- 2024 United States presidential election in Wisconsin
- Cost of Voting Index
- VoteRiders#Wisconsin
