= John Stewart Bragdon =

US Army general (1891–1964)

John S. Bragdon
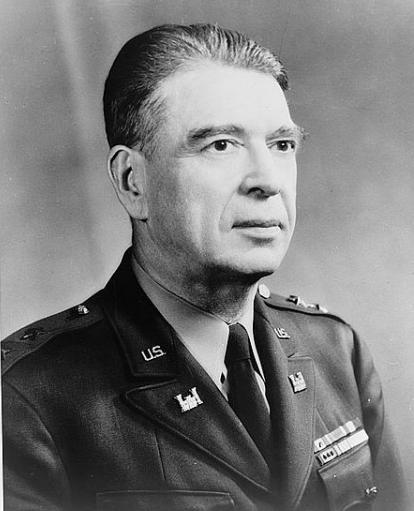
- Born: May 21, 1893; Pittsburgh, Pennsylvania, U.S.
- Died: January 7, 1964 (aged 70); Washington, D.C., U.S.
- Burial place: West Point Cemetery
- Military career
- Allegiance: United States of America
- Branch: United States Army
- Service years: 1915–1951
- Rank: Major General
- Commands: Deputy Chief of Engineers
- Awards: Distinguished Service Medal (2)

John Stewart Bragdon (May 21, 1893 – January 7, 1964), was a major general in the United States Army.

== Early life and education ==
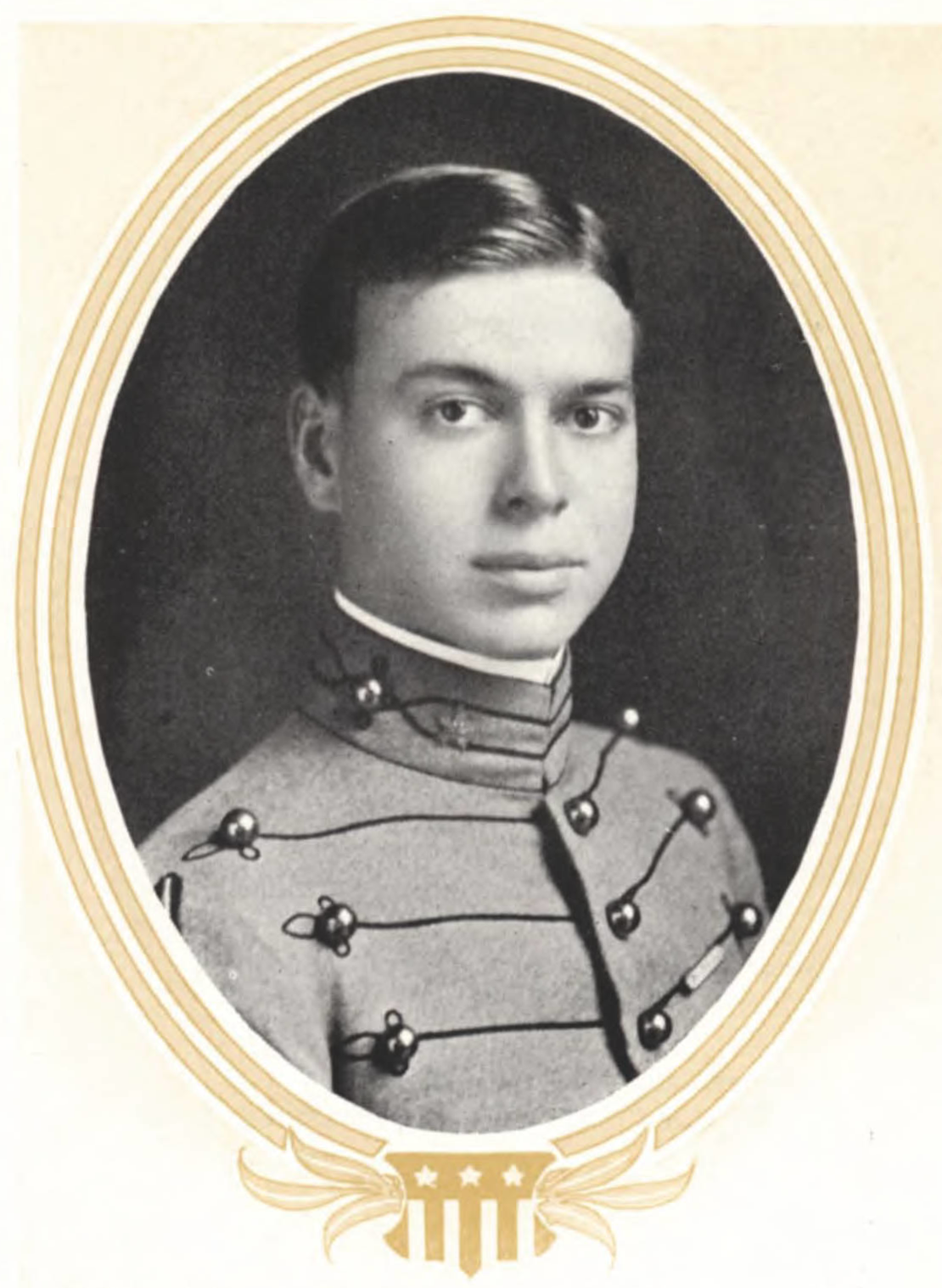
At West Point in 1915

John Stewart Bragdon was born in Pittsburgh, Pennsylvania and earned a B.S. from the United States Military Academy in 1915. In 1919 he graduated from the United States Engineering School and went on to earn a M.S. from the Carnegie Institute of Technology in 1923.

== Army life ==
Following his graduation, Bragdon embarked on a career in the military. He served as an instructor in the Department of Civil and Military Engineering at the U.S. Military Academy from 1923 to 1924. From 1924 to 1927, he was an instructor at the U.S. Engineering School. In 1928 he graduated from the Command and General Staff College and the following year found him on the Army General Staff in the Philippine Islands where he remained until 1931. From 1931 to 1935, Bragdon was a contract officer in the Engineering Department for the United States Department of War. From 1935 to 1937, Bragdon was Assistant Division Engineer of the North Atlantic Division of the War Department's Engineering Department. Bragdon then served as the U.S. District Engineer in Providence, Rhode Island until he started work as a division engineer for the South Atlantic Division within the War Department. From 1944 to 1949, he served as the Director of Military Construction for the U.S. Army. By 1948, Bragdon was serving as the Assistant of Engineers for the U.S. Army. He served in that position until 1951.

== Civilian life ==
Following his departure from the Army, Bragdon returned to private life. From 1951 to 1953, Bragdon was a construction engineer for the Vermilya-Brown Construction Company until his promotion to vice-president of the company in 1954. He returned to public life in 1954 when he served on the staff of the Council of Economic Advisors. He remained in that role until 1955. From 1955 to 1960, Bragdon served as Special Assistant to President Dwight D. Eisenhower for Public Works Planning. From 1960 to 1961, Bragdon was a member of the Civil Aeronautics Board and from 1961 to 1962 he was the consultant for the House Committee on Public Works.

In his various advisory roles on public works, within both the executive and legislative branches, Bragdon was concerned primarily with four subjects: the achievement of effective state and local public works planning and its coordination with federal public works planning, the provision for a "shelf" of public works that could be undertaken as a contracyclical measure during economic recessions, implementation of the Federal Aid Highway Act of 1956, and the development of a systematic approach to water resources development.

=== Difficulties ===
Bragdon encountered many difficulties in pursuing these objectives, inasmuch as his role was merely advisory. During the Eisenhower Administration, his efforts to create a statutory office of public works planning were met with resistance from the agencies and departments jealous of their prerogatives. His attempt to create a public works contingency plan for economic recessions was defeated, in part, by United States Department of the Treasury and U.S. Bureau of the Budget officials who felt that public works acceleration would not be effective as a short-run measure and that the mere existence of such a contingency plan would be mistaken from a psychological standpoint in that it might aggravate fears of an economic downturn and precipitate a crisis.

Bragdon also encountered agency opposition in his proposal to finance a portion of the expanding federal highway system through the use of tolls. Finally, his effort to establish a coordinated water resources policy ran afoul of agencies unwilling to relinquish authority over projects under construction and those planned for the future, and a Congress that spoke for particular groups and represented the viewpoint of the state in the complex constitutional dispute over federal versus state control of water rights.

During his tenure as consultant to the U.S. House Committee on Public Works and Transportation, chaired by Congressman John Blatnik of Minnesota, Bragdon again attempted to implement several of his ideas that had been frustrated during the Eisenhower Administration. With Blatnik, he drafted in 1962 a "Public Works Planning Act" that would have provided for a statutory coordinator of public works, readiness public works plans to be implemented during economic recessions, assistance to state and local governments in public works planning, and comprehensive water resources planning. Again he failed to see his vision of comprehensive, coordinated public works and water resources planning become a reality, as Congress passed instead and omnibus appropriation bill for a list of specific public works.

Apparently, Bragdon's frustrations in dealing with the White House staff during his service as advisor in the executive branch prompted his attempt in 1961 to write and expose detailing the roadblocks he encountered while serving as advisor on public works. Bragdon believed that the Bureau of the Budget, in making substantive policy proposals, overstepped its functions, which should have been purely budgetary. The congressional liaison staff, in Bragdon's view, subordinated ideas to political considerations. He concluded that the net effect of the obstructionism of the Budget Bureau and the liaison staff was to block the presentation of innovative ideas to decision makers. Bragdon believed that a complete reorganization of the White House Staff was necessary to solve the problem. To counter-act the narrow perspective of the Bureau of the Budget and the congressional liaison staff, he proposed the creation of a "substantive staff" of expert in specific functional areas that would have screened ideas, shaped those that were worthwhile into sound proposals, and forward them to the chief executive.

== Death ==
Bragdon died at Walter Reed General Hospital on January 7, 1964, and was buried at West Point Cemetery.
