= Foundation for Government Accountability =

Conservative public policy think tank based in Naples, Florida

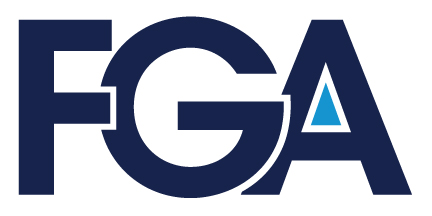
- Founder: Tarren Bragdon
- Established: 2011
- Focus: Health care and welfare policy reform
- President: Tarren Bragdon
- Budget: Revenue: $14.8 million Expenses: $13.8 million (FYE December 2024)
- Address: 15275 Collier Blvd. Naples, Florida 34119
- Location: Naples, Florida, U.S., United States
- Coordinates: 26.2719°N 81.6909°W
- Interactive map of Foundation for Government Accountability
- Website: thefga.org

The Foundation for Government Accountability (FGA) is a conservative American public policy think tank based in Naples, Florida. The nonprofit organization primarily focuses on reducing the welfare state, cutting government regulations, expanding health care options, reforming election laws, reducing restrictions on teenage workers, and blocking the expansion of Medicaid at both the state and federal levels. FGA conducts policy research and its experts recommend free-market policies intended to promote work, reduce dependency, and increase opportunity. The organization was founded in 2011 by Tarren Bragdon, now FGA's CEO and president, according to FGA's website.

== History ==
FGA was founded in 2011 by Tarren Bragdon, a former Maine legislator and past CEO of the Maine Heritage Policy Center. According to the organization, FGA was founded with a focus on policy reform in Florida, but the organization adapted to a multi-state focus to implement reforms that reduce government nationwide and cutting social safety net and anti-poverty programs.

FGA is a 501(c)(3) nonprofit organization under the U.S. Internal Revenue Code. FGA states that it is primarily funded by individuals, with the remaining funding coming from foundations and businesses. In 2011, the organization's income was $212,000 and in 2012 its funding grew to $731,000. By 2018, the organization's revenue was $9,424,541. The organization's latest public report, from 2024, discloses $14.8 million in revenue. FGA also engages in lobbying under the 501(c)(4) organization FGA Action, formerly known as Opportunity Solutions Project.

FGA's five largest donors in 2022 were the Ed Uihlein Family Foundation, the 85 Fund, a nonprofit connected to political operative Leonard Leo, the Sarah Scaife Foundation, the Searle Freedom Trust, and Donors Trust.

FGA is unlike traditional think tanks in that its primary focus is on marketing and policy messaging. Jim McGann, the director of the Think Tanks and Civil Societies Program at the University of Pennsylvania noted, "FGA isn't doing much 'thinking,' in the traditional sense. But they market policy. They push, repackage and franchise other people's ideas for implementation."

== Policy issues ==
=== Election reform ===
The FGA has been heavily involved in promoting conservative election reforms since the 2020 presidential election between Joe Biden and Donald Trump. The Kansas City Star reported that the FGA's advocacy arm "has become a leading advocate for state bills to place restrictions on election administration."

In May 2024, the organization's CEO, Tarren Bragdon, signed onto a letter with 52 other conservative leaders in support of the Safeguard American Voter Eligibility (SAVE) Act. The letter was addressed to House Speaker Mike Johnson (R-La.) and Senator Mitch McConnell (R-Ky.). The SAVE Act, which is billed as a measure to prevent non-citizens from voting in federal elections, passed the U.S. House of Representatives on April 10, 2025. Four Democratic members of Congress joined the Republican-led House in support of the SAVE Act.

=== Health care reform ===
Blocking Medicaid expansion has been a longtime project of the FGA, as it sees Medicaid spending under the Affordable Care Act, or Obamacare, as unsustainable, threatening both state budgets and the services provided to traditional Medicaid patients. One study developed a measure of "right-wing network strength" based on activity by organizations including the FGA, and found via linear regression that this measure was a statistically significant factor in whether or not a state expanded the program.

"Right to Shop" is an FGA proposal for a mechanism incentivizing patients to shop for health care services based on price and perceived value. It is based on existing programs, including a Massachusetts price transparency component and New Hampshire's Smart Shopper program.

=== Teenage employment ===
The FGA has designed numerous policies to undermine or repeal parts of the 1938 Fair Labor Standards Act, particularly with an eye towards expanding the legality of teenage labor. FGA's framing of these bills includes a stated commitment to expanding parental rights, expanding the US workforce, and deconstructing government regulations, stating that these bills remove a "...permission slip that inserts government in between parents and their teenager's desire to work." According to The Washington Post, the FGA "has called for reforming home-based business laws, fast-tracking permitting processes, cutting social safety nets, and creating other incentives to work." The FGA-backed legislation to eliminate government-issued teen work permits saw proposal or passage in 2023 in a number of states, including Iowa, Arkansas, Georgia, Minnesota, Ohio, and Missouri.

=== Welfare reform ===
By studying and tracking the impact of different reforms, the FGA aims to describe what welfare policies have a demonstrable effect on the incomes and independence of people on welfare. The FGA conducted what describes itself as the first and most comprehensive study of the impact of work requirements on able-bodied adults on food stamps. The study concluded that incomes more than doubled within a year for those who transitioned out of the program, in contrast to other studies that found far more modest or even negative gains after comparable programs imposed time limits or means-testing. The study, which was promoted by Republicans, was criticized by both liberal and conservative economists for cherry-picking data, including only reporting outcomes from former food stamp recipients who found jobs after losing benefits.

FGA supports work requirements tied to food stamps. The organization advocated for welfare changes in several different states before beginning to advocate for changes at a federal level in 2017. FGA supports legislation that would require able-bodied individuals between the ages of 18 and 60 to work or attend training programs for 20 hours each week in order to receive benefits.

On June 25, 2025, testifying before the House Budget Committee in a hearing on Medicaid, Nick Stehle, FGA's vice president of communications, said: "Choosing not to act is relegating the program to putting the truly needy last and fraudsters, illegal aliens, and able-bodied adults who sit at home first - all while taxpayers foot the bill for an ever growing program."

Jonathan Ingram, the organization's vice president of policy and research, was quoted by CNN on the issue. "If you are an able-bodied adult and there's no expectation of you to work or train or volunteer in any way, there's going to be a large number who don't," he said.

=== Project 2025 ===
FGA was a member of the advisory board of Project 2025, a collection of conservative and right-wing policy proposals from the Heritage Foundation to reshape the United States federal government and consolidate executive power should the Republican nominee win the 2024 presidential election.
