= Jonathan Bragdon =

American artist

- Born: 1944 (age 81–82); Wilmington, Delaware, United States
- Education: University of Strasbourg; Ecole d’ Etudes Sociales et Pedagogiques, University of Massachusetts Amherst
- Known for: Artist

Jonathan Bragdon is an American artist who has lived in the Netherlands since 1979. His work is represented in numerous international collections including the Stedelijk Museum.

== Life and work ==
Bragdon attended University of Strasbourg in 1963 and then enrolled in the Ecole d’ Etudes Sociales et Pedagogiques, Lausanne, for art therapy in psychiatry in 1965. After a summer interning at L’Hôpital Psychiatrique de Malèvoz and the sell-out of his first solo show at the Schuster Gallery, Cambridge, Massachusetts in September 1967, he decided to become a professional artist. Bragdon moved to the Netherlands in 1989 and settled permanently after marriage.

“Bragdon’s rigorous examination of landscape becomes something akin to a struggle. He describes it as a “free fall” in which the discernable spatial arrangement of things and their objective denotation gradually fall apart. The outer world has become nothing but a loose network of possibilities that are ordered anew during the lengthy drawing process. “It is as if the existence of the landscape and myself come into balance [...]”

This balance is embodied in the main characteristic of Jonathan Bragdon’s artwork – the simultaneousness of representation and abstraction that is evident on levels of production as well as reception. According to Dr. Dorothée Brill (Museum für Moderne Kunst, Frankfurt), “One moment the drawing appears to be a detailed depiction of each leaf, stem and stone; the next they dissolve into an abstract network of lines.” The observer is not offered a predetermined standpoint; rather, he is drawn into a vivid and pulsating dialogue with the work.

== Exhibitions ==
- 2008 Why I Think My Drawings Are Not A Waste Of Time, Aurel Scheibler Berlin
- 2006 Phoebus Gallery, Rotterdam
- 2005 Gongju International Art Festival, R.O. Korea
- 2002 Kunsttempel, Kassel, in “Stadtprogramm im documenta-jahr 2002”
- 2000 Galerie “frontstore”, Basel
- 2000 Grafisch Atelier ‘t Gooi, Hilversum
- 1988 Wetering Gallery, Amsterdam
- 1987 Galerie Resy Muijsers, Tilburg
- 1985 Wetering Gallery, Amsterdam
- 1985 Galerie Fenna de Vries, Rotterdam
- 1985 Galerie Orez Mobil, Den Haag
- 1984 Wetering Gallery, Amsterdam
- 1983 Galerie Fenna de Vries, Rotterdam
- 1982 Wetering Gallery, Amsterdam
- 1982 Galerie Resy Muijsers, Tilburg
