= Kansas Policy Institute =

American conservative think tank, located in Wichita, Kansas

- Founder: George Pearson
- Established: 1996
- Chair: David Gibson
- President: James Franko
- Budget: Revenue: $1.7 million Expenses: $2.03 million (FYE December 2023)
- Address: 250 N. Water St. Wichita, KS 67202
- Location: Wichita, Kansas
- Coordinates: 37.6894°N 97.3391°W
- Interactive map of Kansas Policy Institute
- Website: kansaspolicy.org

The Kansas Policy Institute (KPI) is a conservative American think tank based in Wichita, Kansas. A member of the State Policy Network, it primarily focuses on state and local policy issues in Kansas, including education, budget and spending, health care, and property taxes. KPI is a 501(c)(3) non-profit organization.

== History ==
Founded in 1996 as the Kansas Public Policy Institute, the think tank changed its name to the Flint Hills Center for Public Policy, then back to Kansas Policy Institute in 2009. It was founded by a group of Kansans who supported the Cato Institute and wanted to apply that model to Kansas state government. KPI hosts events across the state; publishes studies geared toward policy makers, the general public, and community leaders; and uses traditional and social media to discuss state and local government through the free market perspective.

In addition to its policy studies, KPI maintains a site titled KansasOpenGov, it established an online newspaper, The Sentinel, in 2016.

== Affiliations and leadership ==
KPI is affiliated with two national conservative and libertarian political organizations: the American Legislative Exchange Council (ALEC) and the State Policy Network.

KPI was founded by George Pearson, who had worked for nearly three decades as an executive of Koch Industries. He is also affiliated with the Cato Institute and the Atlas Network.

KPI's chairman is David Gibson, while Dave Trabert is the CEO and the president is James Franko.

== Activities ==
In 2010, KPI called attention to the State Unencumbered Fund balances, concluding that state school districts had over $699 million in carryover operating funds. The institute concluded that schools were not spending all of the money they were being given and were instead putting money in the bank. This claim drew both positive and negative attention from the media and school boards and the issue became a topic of conversation in the K-12 finance debate. SB 111 passed the Kansas Legislature in the 2011 session, allowing Kansas school districts to more easily access that money to offset declines in base per-pupil aid from the state. KPI has argued for expanding school choice with charter schools.

A 2013 report by two liberal-leaning groups, the Center for Media and Democracy and ProgressNow, claimed that KPI was "part of a network of state-based think tanks whose purpose is to push right-wing legislation that benefits corporate donors." Dave Trabert of KPI said the accusation was "a lot of hooey to distract people from the issues.
