= Pioneer Institute =

Think tank in the USA

Coordinates: 42.3559°N 71.0574°W

Pioneer Institute for Public Policy Research
- Founder: Lovett C. Peters
- Established: 1988
- Chair: Adam Portnoy
- Executive Director: Jim Stergios
- Budget: Revenue: $5.95 million Expenses: $4.69 million (FYE September 2024)
- Address: 185 Devonshire Street, Suite 1101, Boston, Massachusetts 02110
- Location: United States
- Website: pioneerinstitute.org

Pioneer Institute is a free-market think tank based in Boston, Massachusetts. The organization was founded in 1988 by Lovett C. Peters. Pioneer's stated mission is "to develop and communicate dynamic ideas that advance prosperity and a vibrant civic life in Massachusetts and beyond."

== Activities ==
Pioneer conducts research in the area of education reform, including charter schools and standards-based education. Pioneer's educational reform work strongly influenced education changes in Massachusetts in the early 1990s. The Institute created a fellowship program to train charter school entrepreneurs, which in 2003 became a separate non-profit organization, the Building Excellent Schools Foundation, which trains charter operators around the nation. The Boston Globe wrote that the Pioneer Institute "has a national profile as the brains of the Common Core opposition." Former Massachusetts Senate President Tom Birmingham, a Democrat, joined the Pioneer Institute in 2015 as Distinguished Senior Fellow in Education.

The Institute also conducts research on healthcare policy, job and business creation, limited and effective state and local government, welfare reform, public pensions, public finance, and government transparency.

== See also ==
- Charlie Baker, former executive director
- List of think tanks
