= Maine Policy Institute =

Conservative free-market think tank

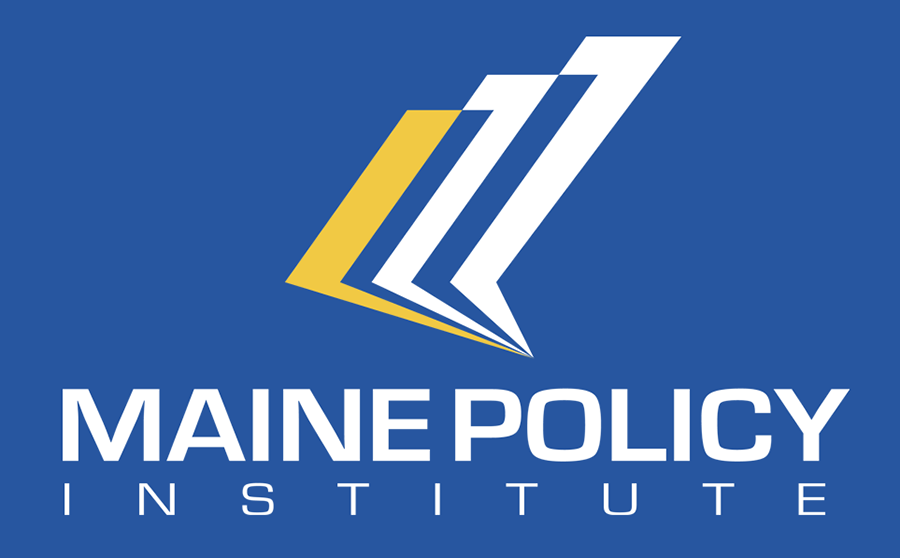
- Founder: Dick Jackson
- Established: 2002; 24 years ago
- Focus: Public policy research and analysis in Maine
- Chair: Scott Wellman
- Chief Executive Officer: Matthew Gagnon
- Budget: Revenue: $1.9 million (2024)
- Subsidiaries: The Maine Wire
- Formerly called: Maine Heritage Policy Center
- Address: P.O. Box 7829; Portland, ME 04112
- Location: Portland, Maine
- Coordinates: 43.6577°N 70.2527°W
- Interactive map of Maine Policy Institute
- Website: www.mainepolicy.org

The Maine Policy Institute (MPI), formerly the Maine Heritage Policy Center, is a conservative public policy think tank located in Portland, Maine. MPI's CEO is Matthew Gagnon. MPI operates The Maine Wire, a media outlet that publishes public policy commentary, political news coverage, and investigative reporting related to Maine legislative issues. The think tank's policy stance has been described as aligning with free-market and limited government positions.

== Activities ==
In 2006, MPI was prominently involved in the unsuccessful campaign for the Taxpayer Bill of Rights (TABOR) in Maine. In August 2011, MPI and the Maine chapter of Americans for Prosperity distributed a videotape produced by conservative activist James O'Keefe which "hint[ed] at" Medicaid fraud.

MPI has been involved in policy debates over issues such as government spending, welfare reform, and Maine's pension debt. The Bangor Daily News reported that critics of the organization have faulted MPI for publishing the salaries of state employees while declining to release the names of the organization's donors. MPI is a member of the State Policy Network.

In 2013, MPI initiated a tax proposal for Maine's poorest area, Washington County. According to the proposal, "residents and businesses would cease to pay state income taxes or collect sales taxes until economic conditions reach the statewide average and stay there for three years running." A grant proposal supporting the initiative was submitted to SPN.

Since 2013, MPI has published healthcare transparency data on the website CompareMaine.org. The website lists, by Maine hospital, how much different procedures cost for patients.

MPI has opposed the Common Core State Standards Initiative and called for the Maine Legislature to allow parents to opt their children out of standardized tests.

In 2014, MPI laid out an agenda for conservative policy-making in Maine. It included a push for welfare reform, making Maine a right-to-work state, a change in Maine's constitution to see the attorney general, secretary of state and state treasurer popularly elected, and tax cuts.

In 2016, the organization published its Piglet Book, a book chronicling wasteful government spending in Maine. The organization wrote that while Maine has made some progress, "state spending is still far larger than it should be, or would be if only Augusta took our spending seriously." The Piglet Book had last been published in 2012.

As of 2025, MPI opposes ranked choice voting. In January 2026, Gagnon wrote in The Dispatch that it "creates confusion and mistrust."

During Maine's 2026 Senate election, Gagnon has regularly appeared on WGME to discuss the state of the race. He criticized the Democratic candidates' "anti-ICE message," praising Susan Collins for appealing to moderate voters.

In 2026, the Maine Policy Institute expressed support for data centers related to artificial intelligence, describing the critics of AI data centers as "luddites." Policy analyst Montana Towers said that "data centers could bring good jobs [and] good opportunities to these regions."
