= Roe Award =

- Sponsored by: State Policy Network
- Date: Annually since 1992
- Location: Arlington County, Virginia, U.S.
- Website: www.spn.org/about/page/the-roe-awards

The Roe Award is an annual award given by the State Policy Network that "pays tribute to those in the state public policy movement whose achievements have greatly advanced the free market philosophy" and "recognizes leadership, innovation and accomplishment in public policy." The award was established in 1992, and it is named after Thomas A. Roe, the late founder of the State Policy Network.

During the first decade of the award, there were multiple winners. Beginning in 2003, the prize was limited to one winner per year. The ceremony in 2013 marked the first time three individuals from one organization had received the Roe Award. The Mackinac Center was also honored for their 25-year effort to pass right-to-work law in Michigan. Five other state-based think tanks have two individuals with the award.

== Award recipients ==
Year	Recipient	Organization	Meeting Location
2021	Justin Owen	Beacon Center of Tennessee	Orlando, Florida
2019	Kimberly O. Dennis	Searle Freedom Trust	Salt Lake City, Utah
2018	John Kramer	Institute for Justice	Denver, Colorado
2016	Clint Bolick	Arizona Supreme Court	Nashville, Tennessee
2015	Whitney Ball	Donors Trust and Donors Capital Fund	Grand Rapids, Michigan
2014	Jeff Coors	Golden Technologies Company	Denver, Colorado
2013	Joe Lehman	Mackinac Center for Public Policy	Oklahoma City, Oklahoma
2012	David R. Brown	Oklahoma Council of Public Affairs and The Heritage Foundation	Amelia Island, Florida
2011	John Tillman	Illinois Policy Institute	Seattle, Washington
2010	Tarren Bragdon	Maine Heritage Policy Center	Cleveland, Ohio
2009	Art Pope	John William Pope Foundation	Asheville, North Carolina
2008	Brooke Rollins	Texas Public Policy Foundation	Scottsdale, Arizona
2007	Kevin Gentry	Charles G. Koch Charitable Foundation	Portland, Maine
2006	Darcy Olsen	Goldwater Institute	Milwaukee, Wisconsin
2005	Jon Caldara	Independence Institute	Charleston, South Carolina
2004	Sally Pipes	Pacific Research Institute	Austin, Texas
2003	Gisèle Huff	Jaquelin Hume Foundation	Seattle, Washington
2002	Jo Kwong	Atlas Economic Research Foundation	Indianapolis, Indiana
2002	Gary Palmer	Alabama Policy Institute	Indianapolis, Indiana
2001	Steve Buckstein	Cascade Policy Institute	Boulder, Colorado
2001	Bridgett G. Wagner	The Heritage Foundation	Boulder, Colorado
2000	J. Stanley Marshall	James Madison Institute	St. Louis, Missouri
2000	William H. "Chip" Mellor	Institute for Justice	St. Louis, Missouri
2000	Lovett "Pete" Peters	Pioneer Institute	St. Louis, Missouri
1999	Grover Norquist	Americans for Tax Reform	Dallas, Texas
1999	Robert W. Poole, Jr.	Reason Foundation	Dallas, Texas
1998	C.C. Guy	South Carolina Policy Council	Atlanta, Georgia
1998	Edward T. McMullen Jr.	South Carolina Policy Council	Atlanta, Georgia
1998	John M. Hood	John Locke Foundation	Atlanta, Georgia
1998	Joseph P. Overton	Mackinac Center for Public Policy	Atlanta, Georgia
1997	Carl Helstrom	JM Foundation	Tempe, Arizona
1997	Bob Williams	Evergreen Freedom Foundation	Tempe, Arizona
1996	William Eggers	Reason Foundation	Minneapolis, Minnesota
1996	John Fund	The Wall Street Journal	Minneapolis, Minnesota
1996	Lawrence Reed	Mackinac Center for Public Policy	Minneapolis, Minnesota
1994	John Andrews	Texas Public Policy Foundation	Tampa, Florida
1994	Joseph Bast	The Heartland Institute	Tampa, Florida
1993	Joseph Dolan	JM Foundation	Traverse City, Michigan
1993	Thomas A. Roe	Roe Foundation	Traverse City, Michigan
1993	J. Patrick Rooney	Golden Rule Insurance Company	Traverse City, Michigan
