= Pat Rooney =

Pat Rooney may refer to:

- Pat Rooney (actor born 1848) (1848–1892), American actor; note this actor is often referred to as Pat Rooney Sr. but his son also went by that name
- Pat Rooney (actor born 1880) (1880–1962), American actor; in his early career known as. Pat Rooney Jr. or Pat Rooney; known as Pat Rooney Sr. in later career
- Pat Rooney III (1909-1962), American actor; performed as Pat Rooney Jr. and Pat Rooney III
- Pat Rooney (baseball) (born 1957), American baseball player
- Pat Rooney (basketball), American basketball player

== See also ==
- Patrick Rooney (disambiguation), various people
