= 2026 South Carolina gubernatorial election =

- November 3, 2026
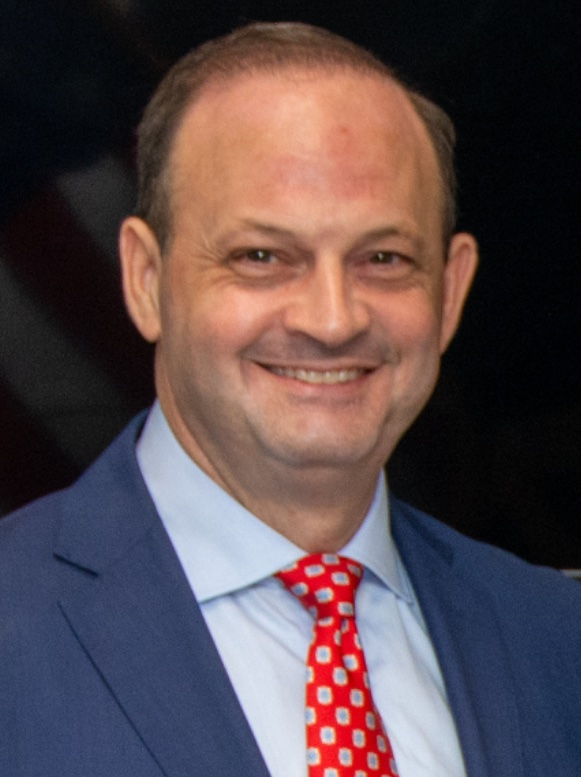

Nominee	Alan Wilson	Jermaine Johnson
Party	Republican	Democratic
Running mate	Mike Reichenbach	Sam Skardon
Popular vote	1,051,334	960,534
Percentage	51.58%	47.13%
- Johnson: 40–50% 50–60% 60–70% 70–80% 80–90% >90% Wilson: 40–50% 50–60% 60–70% 70–80% 80–90% >90% Tie: 40–50% No votes
Governor before election
Henry McMaster
Republican
Elected Governor
Alan Wilson
Republican

The 2026 South Carolina gubernatorial election was held on November 3, 2026, to elect the next governor of South Carolina. Republican state attorney general Alan Wilson defeated Democratic state representative Jermaine Johnson in the general election.

Republican incumbent Henry McMaster was ineligible to seek a third consecutive term. In the Republican primary on June 9, Lieutenant Governor Pamela Evette emerged as the top vote-getter with the help of an endorsement from President Donald Trump, but did not secure a majority needed to win the nomination, triggering a June 23 runoff between her and Wilson. After Trump announced his support for both Wilson and Evette, Wilson was nominated in the runoff with 68.6% of the vote. Johnson won the Democratic nomination in the June 9 primary with 59.7% of the vote against Billy Webster, the chief of staff for former governor Richard Riley.

Democrats have not won a gubernatorial election in South Carolina since 1998. This was the closest South Carolina gubernatorial election since 1994.

== Republican primary ==
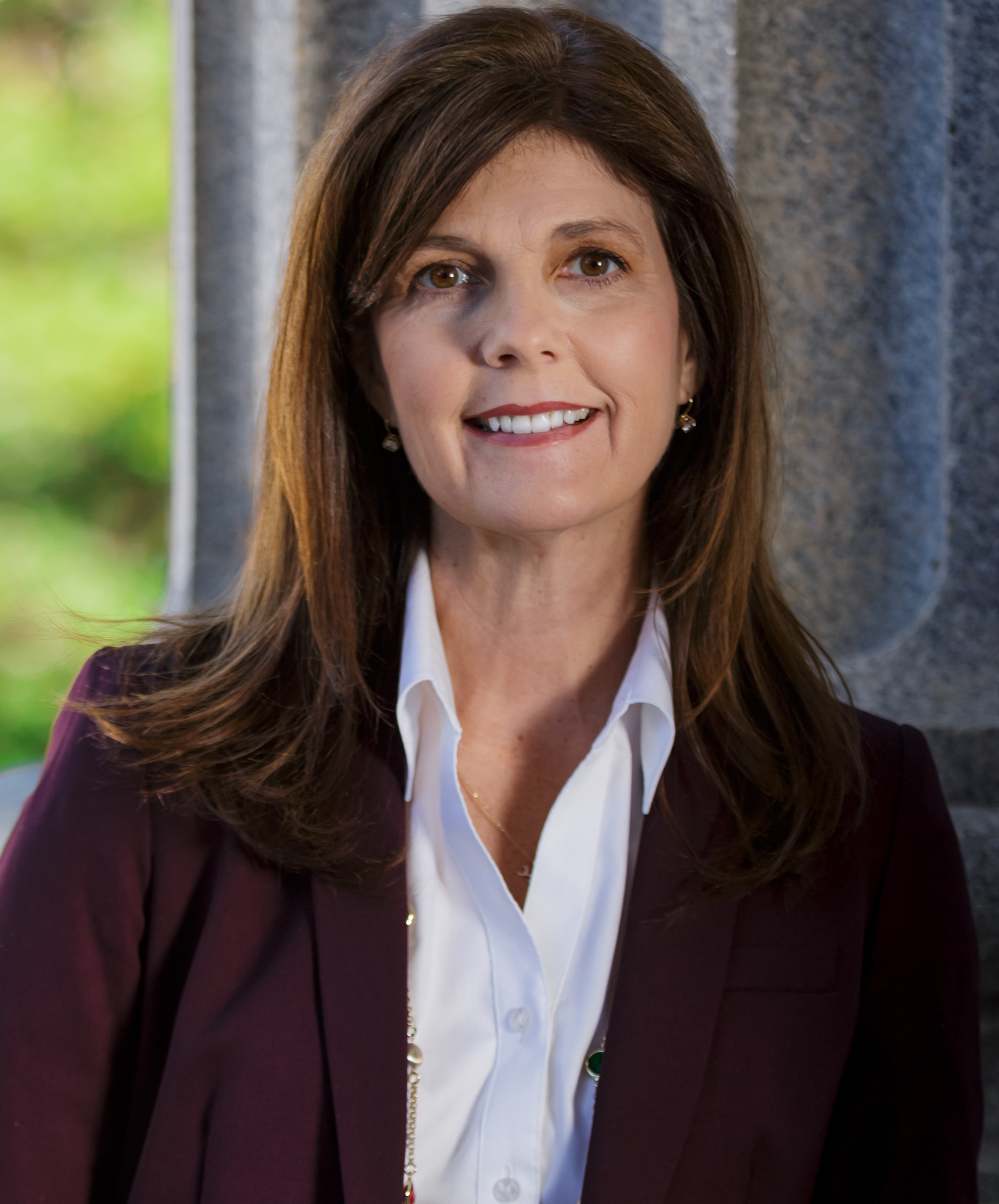
Lieutenant Governor of South Carolina Pamela Evette, who was defeated in the Republican primary runoff.

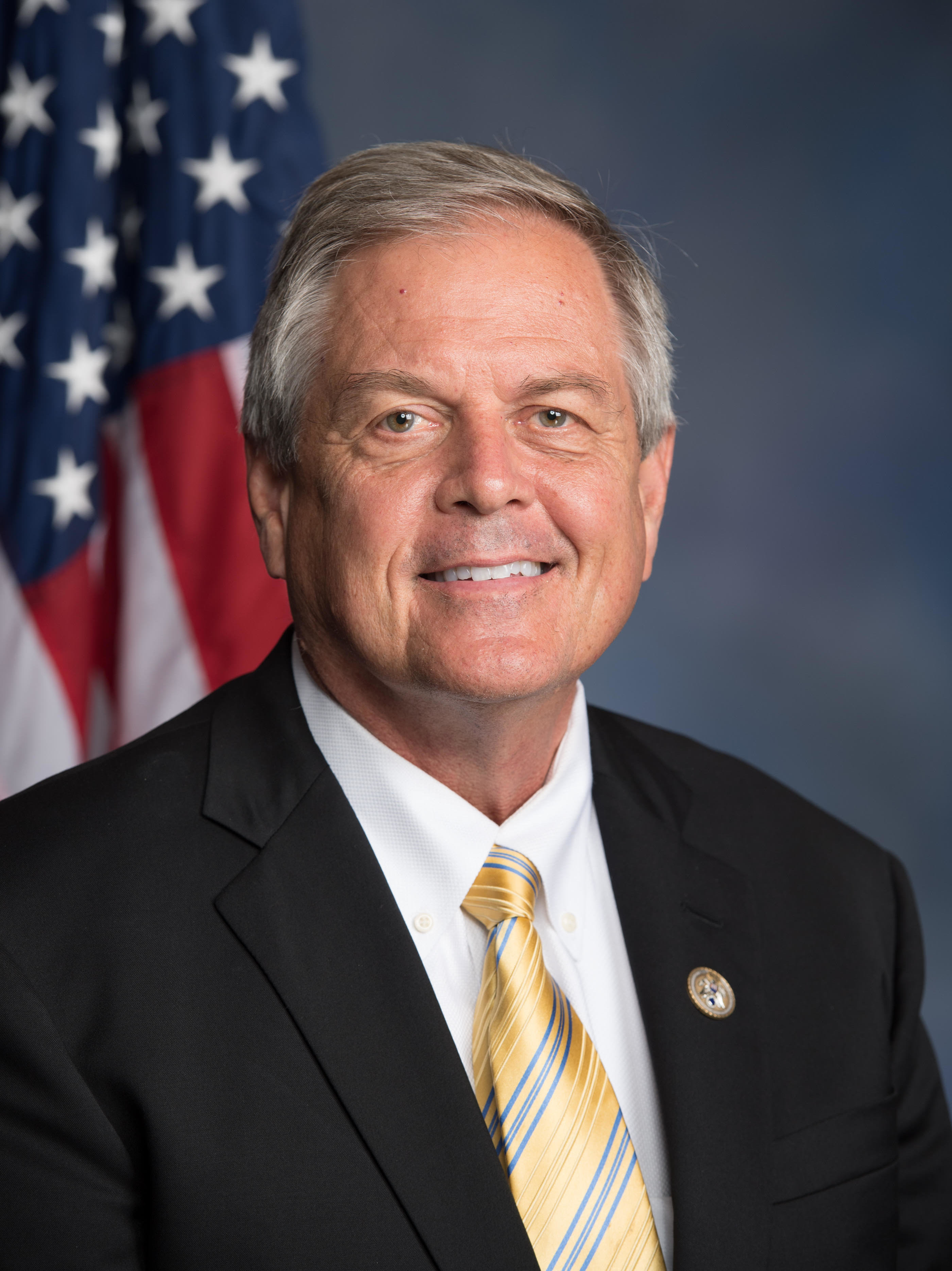
U.S. Representative Ralph Norman, who finished third in the Republican primary.

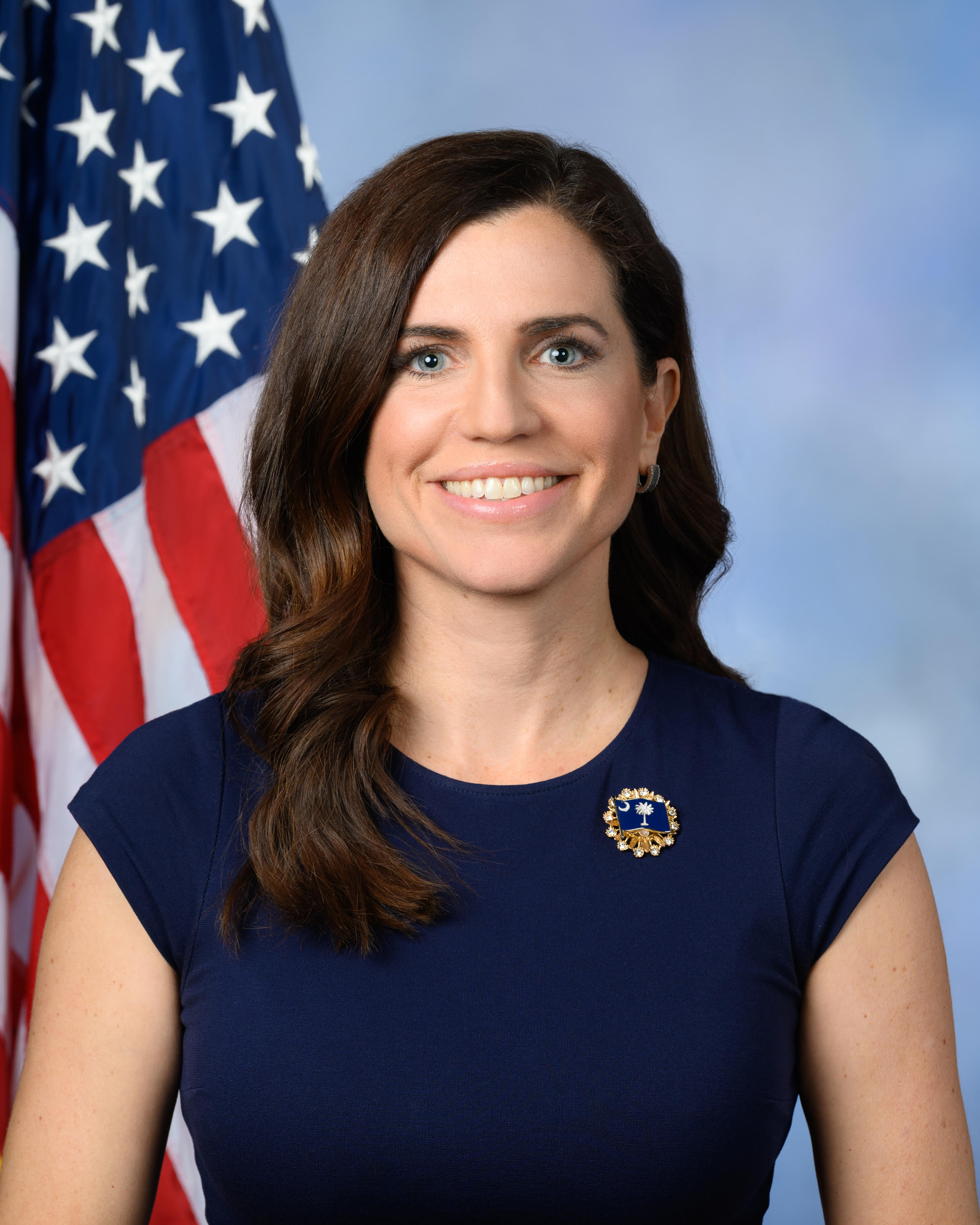
U.S. Representative Nancy Mace, who finished fifth in the Republican primary.

=== Candidates ===
==== Nominee ====
- Alan Wilson, attorney general of South Carolina (2011–present)
  - Running mate: Mike Reichenbach, state senator from the 31st district (2022–present)

==== Eliminated in runoff ====
- Pamela Evette, lieutenant governor of South Carolina (2019–2027)

==== Eliminated in primary ====
- Nancy Mace, U.S. representative for South Carolina's 1st congressional district (2021–2027) and candidate for U.S. Senate in 2014 (endorsed Wilson)
- Ralph Norman, U.S. representative for South Carolina's 5th congressional district (2017–2027) (endorsed Wilson)
  - Running mate: Adam Morgan, former state representative from the 20th district (2018–2024) and candidate for South Carolina's 4th congressional district in 2024
- Rom Reddy, businessman

==== Withdrawn ====
- Josh Kimbrell, state senator from the 11th district (2020–present) (endorsed Wilson, remained on ballot)
- Thomas Ravenel, former state treasurer of South Carolina (2007), candidate for U.S. Senate in 2004 and independent candidate in 2014

==== Decertified ====
- Jacqueline Hicks DuBose, bus driver (remained on ballot)

==== Declined ====
- Mark Sanford, former governor (2003–2011), U.S. representative for South Carolina's 1st congressional district (1995–2001, 2013–2019), and candidate for president in 2020 (ran for congress)

=== First round ===
==== Endorsements ====
Pamela Evette

Executive branch officials

- Donald Trump, president of the United States (2017–2021, 2025–present) (co-endorsed Wilson in the runoff)
- Mick Zais, former deputy secretary of education (2018–2021)

Statewide officials

- Henry McMaster, governor of South Carolina (2017–2027)

State legislators

- Bruce Bannister, HD-24 (2006–present)
- Case Brittain, HD-107 (2020–present)
- Cal Forrest, HD-39 (2016–present)
- Gil Gatch, HD-94 (2020–present)
- Val Guest, HD-106 (2022–present)
- Kevin Hardee, HD-105 (2012–present)
- Davey Hiott, House majority leader (2022–present) from HD-04 (2005–present)
- Bill Hixon, HD-83 (2010–present)
- Tim McGinnis, HD-56 (2018–present)
- Melissa Lackey Oremus, HD-84 (2019–present)
- Carla Schuessler, HD-61 (2022–present)
- Jeff Zell, SD-36 (2025–present)

Party officials

- Karen Floyd, former chair of the South Carolina Republican Party (2009–2011)

Individuals

- James Livingston, retired U.S. Marine Corps major general

Organizations

- Susan B. Anthony Pro-Life America
Ralph Norman

Executive branch officials

- Nikki Haley, former ambassador to the United Nations (2017–2018) and former governor of South Carolina (2011–2017)
- Mark Meadows, former White House chief of staff (2020–2021)

U.S. senators

- Jim DeMint, former South Carolina (2005–2013)

State legislators

- Nathan Ballentine, HD-71 (2004–present) (endorsed Wilson in the runoff)
- Wes Climer, SD-15 (2016–present)
- Brandon Guffey, HD-48 (2023–present)
- Jay Kilmartin, HD-85 (2022–present) (endorsed Wilson in the runoff)
- Jackie Terribile, HD-66 (2025–present) (endorsed Wilson in the runoff)
- Joe White, HD-40 (2022–present) (endorsed Wilson in the runoff)

Organizations

- South Carolina Freedom Caucus
- Students for Life of America
Rom Reddy

Individuals

- David Lucas, real estate developer and petitioner in Lucas v. South Carolina Coastal Council
Alan Wilson

Executive branch officials

- Hugh Hewitt, former deputy director of the Office of Personnel Management (1988–1989)

Statewide officials

- Derek Brown, attorney general of Utah (2025–present)
- Mike Hilgers, attorney general of Nebraska (2023–present)
- Kris Kobach, attorney general of Kansas (2023–present)
- J.B. McCuskey, attorney general of West Virginia (2025–present)
- Liz Murrill, attorney general of Louisiana (2024–present)
- Todd Rokita, attorney general of Indiana (2021–present)
- Dave Sunday, attorney general of Pennsylvania (2025–present)

State legislators

- JD Chaplin, SD-29 (2024–present)
- Josh Kimbrell, SD-11 (2020–present) and former gubernatorial candidate

Local officials

- 23 county sheriffs

Individuals

- Bob Jones III, former president of Bob Jones University (1971–2005)

Newspapers

- The Post and Courier
Josh Kimbrell (withdrawn)

State legislators

- Matt Leber, SD-41 (2024–present)
- David Martin, HD-26 (2024–present) (endorsed Wilson in the runoff)

==== Polling ====
Aggregate polls

Source of poll aggregation	Dates administered	Dates updated	Pamela Evette	Nancy Mace	Ralph Norman	Rom Reddy	Alan Wilson	Other/ Undecided (Note: Calculated by taking the difference of 100% and all other candidates combined.)	Margin
RealClearPolitics	June 1–7, 2026	June 9, 2026	20.2%	12.2%	14.2%	14.6%	18.2%	20.6% (Note: Josh Kimbrell with 2.3%)	Evette +2.0%
Race to the WH	through June 6, 2026	June 9, 2026	19.3%	13.7%	13.8%	14.5%	17.6%	21.1% (Note: Josh Kimbrell with 2.0%; Sean Bennett with 1.2%; Jacqueline DuBose with 1.1%)	Evette +1.7%
Decision Desk HQ	through June 7, 2026	June 9, 2026	19.6%	13.5%	14.4%	16.0%	18.5%	18.0%	Evette +1.1%
270toWin	June 2–8, 2026	June 9, 2026	18.7%	12.8%	13.5%	14.3%	18.8%	21.9% (Note: Josh Kimbrell with 1.0%)	Wilson +0.1%
FiftyPlusOne	through June 7, 2026	June 9, 2026	20.1%	13.1%	13.8%	14.5%	17.4%	21.1%	Evette +2.7%
Average			19.6%	13.1%	13.9%	14.8%	18.1%	20.5%	Evette +1.5%

Poll source	Date(s) administered	Sample size (Note: Key: A – all adults RV – registered voters LV – likely voters V – unclear)	Margin of error	Pamela Evette	Josh Kimbrell	Nancy Mace	Ralph Norman	Rom Reddy	Alan Wilson	Other	Undecided
Trafalgar Group (R)	June 5–7, 2026	1,200 (LV)	± 2.9%	22%	1%	14%	16%	18%	21%	1% (Note: Jacqueline Dubose with 1%)	7%
InsiderAdvantage (R)	June 5–6, 2026	800 (LV)	± 3.5%	19%	4%	13%	12%	13%	16%	1%	22%
	June 4, 2026	Kimbrell withdraws from the race									
Starboard Communications	June 3–4, 2026	500 (LV)	± 4.4%	19%	–	12%	13%	14%	19%	–	22%
The Public Sentiment Institute	June 3–4, 2026	388 (LV)	± 5.0%	25%	–	30%	15%	13%	12%	–	5%
co/efficient (R)	June 2–4, 2026	879 (LV)	± 3.3%	23%	2%	11%	15%	17%	16%	–	17%
Trafalgar Group (R)	June 2–4, 2026	982 (LV)	± 2.9%	24%	1%	13%	15%	18%	19%	1%	11%
Tyson Group	June 1–3, 2026	500 (LV)	± 4.4%	18%	–	11%	15%	11%	19%	–	25%
Opinion Diagnostics (R)	June 1–2, 2026	675 (LV)	± 3.8%	17%	2%	12%	12%	16%	22%	–	20%
Trafalgar Group (R)	May 29–31, 2026	(LV)	–	26%	2%	15%	16%	17%	17%	2% (Note: Jacqueline Dubose with 2%)	4%
The Citadel	May 21–31, 2026	600 (LV)	± 4.5%	17%	1%	16%	13%	14%	16%	–	23%
	May 29, 2026	Trump endorses Evette									
McLaughlin & Associates (R)	May 26–28, 2026	600 (LV)	± 4.0%	13%	2%	14%	17%	20%	21%	–	13%
Trafalgar Group (R)	May 21–24, 2026	1,125 (LV)	± 2.9%	20%	2%	15%	16%	19%	19%	3% (Note: Jacqueline Dubose with 3%)	6%
Cygnal (R) (Note: Poll sponsored by Reddy's campaign)	May 20–21, 2026	600 (LV)	–	12%	–	14%	13%	16%	19%	–	24%
Conquest Communications Group/South Carolina Policy Council	May 18–21, 2026	500 (LV)	± 3.2%	16%	1%	13%	15%	10%	14%	–	27%
Cygnal (R)	May 7–8, 2026	600 (LV)	–	19%	–	14%	12%	9%	15%	–	29%
Trafalgar Group (R)	May 2–5, 2026	1,089 (LV)	± 2.9%	25%	4%	15%	20%	10%	23%	3%	–
co/efficient (R)	April 29–30, 2026	813 (LV)	± 3.4%	21%	2%	12%	13%	11%	18%	–	22%
Cygnal (R)	April 13–14, 2026	600 (LV)	–	15%	–	17%	10%	6%	17%	–	34%
Starboard Communications	April 8–14, 2026	604 (LV)	± 4.4%	12%	3%	13%	14%	–	20%	–	28%
co/efficient (R)	March 26–27, 2026	805 (LV)	± 3.5%	19%	1%	18%	13%	5%	15%	–	30%
	March 16, 2026	Reddy enters the race									
co/efficient (R)	March 12–13, 2026	810 (LV)	± 3.4%	21%	1%	22%	8%	–	19%	–	29%
Stratus Intelligence (R) (Note: Poll sponsored by Mace's campaign and conducted by a former Mace campaign advisor)	March 9–11, 2026	600 (LV)	± 4.0%	15%	–	24%	14%	–	18%	–	29%
Quantus Insights (R)	March 10–11, 2026	806 (LV)	± 3.5%	16% (Note: With voters who lean towards a given candidate)	3%	22%	11%	–	22%	–	26%
Quantus Insights (R)	March 10–11, 2026	806 (LV)	± 3.5%	13%	2%	19%	9%	–	18%	–	39%
National Public Affairs (R) (Note: Poll sponsored by Wilson's campaign)	February 2–5, 2026	800 (LV)	± 3.5%	16%	2%	17%	12%	–	23%	–	30%
Targoz Market Research/ South Carolina Policy Council	January 24 – February 1, 2026	540 (LV)	–	12%	4%	18%	11%	–	12%	–	43%
Trafalgar Group (R)	January 15–16, 2026	1,076 (LV)	± 2.9%	22%	2%	17%	10%	–	20%	–	29%
Stratus Intelligence (R)	January 7–9, 2026	700 (LV)	± 3.7%	14%	–	23%	11%	–	19%	–	32%
Cygnal (R)	January 5–6, 2026	402 (LV)	–	12%	–	15%	8%	–	19%	–	45%
Wick (Note: Poll sponsored by the Palmetto Promise Institute)	December 16–19, 2025	800 (LV)	± 3.5%	17%	2%	13%	13%	–	23%	–	33%
Wick	November 24–26, 2025	600 (LV)	± 4.0%	16%	2%	11%	12%	–	22%	–	38%
Winthrop University	October 2–19, 2025	1,331 (RV)	± 3.9%	16%	3%	17%	8%	–	8%	1% (Note: "Prefer not to say" with 1%)	47%
Quantus Insights (R) (Note: Poll sponsored by Trending Politics, a conservative news website)	October 1–4, 2025	600 (RV)	± 4.2%	17%	5%	16%	11%	–	16%	–	35%
Quantus Insights (R)	October 1–4, 2025	600 (RV)	± 4.2%	22%	6%	20%	13%	–	23%	–	16%
Trafalgar Group (R)	September 30 – October 2, 2025	1,094 (LV)	± 2.9%	20%	1%	16%	9%	–	12%	–	41%
co/efficient (R)	September 18–19, 2025	1,094 (LV)	± 3.2%	18%	2%	19%	10%	–	16%	–	35%
Meeting Street Insights (R) (Note: Poll sponsored by Mace's campaign)	August 11–12, 2025	600 (LV)	± 4.0%	6%	3%	25%	10%	–	17%	–	38%
Meeting Street Insights (R)	August 11–12, 2025	600 (LV)	± 4.0%	7%	4%	30%	12%	–	21%	–	26%
Targoz Market Research/ South Carolina Policy Council	July 21–25, 2025	1,200 (RV)	± 2.8%	8%	3%	16%	6%	–	15%	–	52%
yes. every kid. (D)	July 18–21, 2025	406 (LV)	± 4.86%	9%	3%	19%	8%	–	20%	2%	37%
First Tuesday Strategies (R)	March 19–21, 2025	500 (LV)	± 4.4%	7%	2%	16%	6%	–	21%	1% (Note: Sean Bennett with 1%)	47%
Trafalgar Group (R)	March 8–10, 2025	1,127 (LV)	± 2.9%	31%	–	29%	11%	–	27%	–	2%

==== Debates ====
Republican primary debates
No.	Date	Host	Moderator	Link	Republican	Republican	Republican	Republican	Republican	Republican
Key: P Participant N Not invited I Invited										
Key: P Participant N Not invited I Invited					Pamela Evette	Josh Kimbrell	Nancy Mace	Ralph Norman	Rom Reddy	Alan Wilson
1	April 1, 2026	Newberry Opera House; Gray Media	Justin Dougherty	YouTube	N	P	P	P	N	P
2	April 21, 2026	College of Charleston; Gray Media	Justin Dougherty	YouTube	P	P	P	P	P	P
3	May 26, 2026	Wofford College; Gray Media	Justin Dougherty	YouTube	I	N	P	P	P	P

==== Results ====
County results Evette: 20–30%; 30–40%; 40–50%; 50–60%; Wilson: 20–30%; 30–40%; 40–50%; 50–60%; Norman: 20–30%; 30–40%

Congressional district results Evette: 20–30%; 40–50%; Wilson: 20–30%; 30–40%; Norman: 20–30%; 30–40%

Republican primary results
Party	Candidate	Votes	%
Republican	Pamela Evette	136,480	28.9
Republican	Alan Wilson	123,643	26.2
Republican	Ralph Norman	80,790	17.1
Republican	Rom Reddy	66,992	14.1
Republican	Nancy Mace	57,380	12.1
Republican	Josh Kimbrell (withdrawn)	3,957	0.8
Republican	Jacqueline DuBose (decertified)	3,714	0.8
Total votes		472,956	100.0

=== Runoff ===
==== Endorsements ====
Pamela Evette

Executive branch officials

- Donald Trump, president of the United States (2017–2021, 2025–present) (co-endorsement with Wilson)

Statewide officials

- Curtis Loftis, treasurer of South Carolina (2011–present)

State legislators

- Jeff Bradley, HD-123 (2014–present)
- Mike Burns, HD-17 (2013–present)
- Bill Chumley, HD-35 (2010–present)
- Chris Huff, HD-28 (2024–present)
- Tommy Pope, speaker pro tempore (2014–present) from HD-47 (2010–present)
- Ashley Trantham, former HD-28 (2018–2024)

Organizations

- Turning Point Action
Alan Wilson

Executive branch officials

- Donald Trump, president of the United States (2017–2021, 2025–present) (co-endorsement with Evette)

U.S. senators

- Ted Cruz, Texas (2013–present)
- Tim Scott, South Carolina (2013–present)

U.S. representatives

- Nancy Mace, SC-01 (2021–present) and former gubernatorial candidate
- Ralph Norman, SC-05 (2017–present) and former gubernatorial candidate

Statewide officials

- Patrick Morrisey, governor of West Virginia (2025–present)

State legislators

- Nathan Ballentine, HD-71 (2004–present) (previously endorsed Norman)
- Tom Davis, SD-46 (2009–present)
- Brandon Guffey, HD-48 (2023–present)
- Michael Johnson, SD-16 (2020–present)
- Jay Kilmartin, HD-85 (2022–present) (previously endorsed Norman)
- David Martin, HD-26 (2024–present) (previously endorsed Kimbrell)
- Heath Sessions, HD-46 (2022–present)
- Everett Stubbs, SD-17 (2025–present)
- Jackie Terribile, HD-66 (2025–present) (previously endorsed Norman)
- Joe White, HD-40 (2022–present) (previously endorsed Norman)
Declined to endorse

Individuals

- Rom Reddy, businessman and former gubernatorial candidate

==== Polling ====
Poll source	Date(s) administered	Sample size	Margin of error	Pamela Evette	Alan Wilson	Undecided
Opinion Diagnostics (R)	June 21–22, 2026	875 (LV)	± 3.3%	23%	65%	12%
JMC Analytics (R)	June 13–15, 2026	500 (LV)	± 4.4%	28%	63%	9%
National Public Affairs (R)	June 10–11, 2026	600 (LV)	± 4.0%	36%	52%	13%
Opinion Diagnostics (R)	June 10–11, 2026	625 (LV)	± 3.9%	39%	46%	15%
Opinion Diagnostics (R)	June 1–2, 2026	675 (LV)	± 3.8%	29%	48%	22%

==== Debate ====
Republican primary runoff debate
No.	Date	Host	Moderator	Link	Republican	Republican
Key: P Participant						
Key: P Participant					Pamela Evette	Alan Wilson
1	June 16, 2026	Coastal Carolina University; Gray Media	Justin Dougherty	YouTube	P	P

==== Results ====
County results Wilson: 50–60%; 60–70%; 70–80%; Evette: 50–60%; 60–70%

Congressional district results Wilson: 50–60%; 60–70%; 70–80%

Republican primary runoff results
Party	Candidate	Votes	%
Republican	Alan Wilson	218,569	68.6
Republican	Pamela Evette	100,227	31.4
Total votes		318,796	100.0

== Democratic primary ==
=== Candidates ===
==== Nominee ====
- Jermaine Johnson, state representative from the 80th district (Note: Multiple districts; 52nd district since 2024) (2020–present)
  - Running mate: Sam Skardon, former chair of the Charleston County Democratic Party

==== Eliminated in primary ====
- Mullins McLeod, trial attorney and candidate for governor in 2010
- Billy Webster, former chief of staff for Richard Riley and businessman

==== Declined ====
- Russell Ott, state senator from the 26th district (2024–present)

=== Endorsements ===
Jermaine Johnson

U.S. representatives

- Ro Khanna, CA-17 (2017–present)

State legislators

- Carl Anderson, HD-103 (2005–present)
- Heather Bauer, HD-75 (2022–present)
- Bill Clyburn, HD-82 (1995–present)
- Kambrell Garvin, HD-77 (2018–present)
- Jerry Govan Jr., HD-93 (1992–2022, 2024–present)
- Hamilton R. Grant, HD-79 (2025–present)
- Rosalyn Henderson-Myers, HD-31 (2017–present)
- Leon Howard, HD-76 (1995–present)
- Wendell K. Jones, HD-25 (2022–present)
- John Richard C. King, HD-49 (2009–present)
- Annie McDaniel, HD-41 (2018–present)
- Robert Reese, HD-70 (2024–present)
- Michael F. Rivers Sr., HD-121 (2016–present)
- Seth Rose, HD-72 (2018–present)
- Courtney Waters, HD-113 (2025–present)
- J. David Weeks, HD-51 (2000–present)
- Robert Q. Williams, HD-62 (2007–present)

Labor unions

- South Carolina AFL-CIO
Mullins McLeod

State legislators

- Wendell Gilliard, HD-111 (2009–present)
Billy Webster

Executive branch officials

- Stephen K. Benjamin, former director of the Office of Public Engagement (2023–2025) and mayor of Columbia (2010–2022)
- Bill Clinton, former president of the United States (1993–2001)

Newspapers

- Charleston City Paper

=== Polling ===
Poll source	Date(s) administered	Sample size	Margin of error	Jermaine Johnson	Mullins McLeod	Billy Webster	Undecided
The Citadel	May 21–31, 2026	427 (LV)	± 4.7%	33%	6%	18%	43%
Conquest Communications Group/ South Carolina Policy Council	May 18–21, 2026	500 (LV)	± 3.2%	27%	6%	14%	49%
Targoz Market Research/ South Carolina Policy Council	January 24 – February 1, 2026	348 (LV)	–	25%	8%	–	67%

=== Debate ===
Democratic primary debate
No.	Date	Host	Moderator	Link	Democratic	Democratic	Democratic
Key: P Participant							
Key: P Participant					Jermaine Johnson	Mullins McLeod	Billy Webster
1	June 3, 2026	SCETV	Gavin Jackson	YouTube	P	P	P

=== Results ===
Results by county Johnson: 50–60%; 60–70%; 70–80%; Webster: 40–50%

Democratic primary results
Party	Candidate	Votes	%
Democratic	Jermaine Johnson	221,951	59.7
Democratic	Billy Webster	110,303	29.6
Democratic	William Mullins McLeod Jr.	39,739	10.7
Total votes		371,993	100.0

== United Citizens Party convention ==
- Michael Addison, nominee (United Citizens Party), Democratic candidate for SC-6 in 2022
  - Running mate: Candace Brewer, activist

== Green Party convention ==
- Walid Hakim,nominee (South Carolina Green Party), veteran

== South Carolina Workers Party convention ==
=== Withdrawn ===
- Gary Votour, nominee (South Carolina Workers Party), Democratic candidate for governor in 2022 (endorsed Johnson)

== General election ==
=== Predictions ===
Source	Ranking	As of
The Cook Political Report	Solid R	October 29, 2026
Decision Desk HQ	Likely R	November 3, 2026
Fox News	Solid R	November 1, 2026
Inside Elections	Solid R	October 29, 2026
NBC News	Solid R	November 3, 2026
RealClearPolitics	Likely R	November 1, 2026
Sabato's Crystal Ball	Safe R	November 2, 2026
Silver Bulletin	Solid R	November 3, 2026

=== Post-primary endorsements ===
Alan Wilson (R)

Organizations

- South Carolina Fraternal Order of Police
Jermaine Johnson (D)

Statewide officials

- Andy Beshear, governor of Kentucky (2019–present)
- Wes Moore, governor of Maryland (2023–present)
- Gavin Newsom, governor of California (2019–2027)

State legislators

- Katrina Shealy, SD-23 (2013–2024) (Republican)

Individuals

- Gary Votour, former gubernatorial candidate (third-party)

=== Polling ===
Poll source	Date(s) administered	Sample size	Margin of error	Alan Wilson (R)	Jermaine Johnson (D)	Other	Undecided
Trafalgar Group (R)	October 31 – November 1, 2026	1,091 (LV)	± 2.9%	54%	39%	2% (Note: Michael Addison (UCP) with 25; Walid Hakim (G) with 0%)	5%
Resonance Media Services (R)	October 30, 2026	600 (LV)	± 4.0%	51%	42%	1% (Note: "Other candidates" with 1%)	6%
New York Times/Siena University	October 19–26, 2026	707 (LV)	± 4.3%	51%	44%	0%	5%
Targoz Media Research (Note: Poll conducted for the South Carolina Policy Council)	October 16–25, 2026	895 (LV)	± 2.77%	51%	41%	2% (Note: Michael Addison (UCP) & Walid Hakim (G) with 1%)	5%
The Citadel	October 14–25, 2026	890 (LV)	± 4.5%	42%	31%	—	26%
The Citadel	October 14–25, 2026	1,009 (RV)	± 3.2%	36%	32%	4% (Note: "Not voting" with 2%, Michael Addison (UCP) with 1%, Walid Hakim (G) with 1%)	28%
Trafalgar Group (R)	October 16–18, 2026	1,095 (LV)	± 2.9%	53%	37%	6% (Note: Michael Addison (UC) with 4%; Walid Hakim (G) with 2%)	5%
National Public Affairs	October 13–16, 2026	604 (LV)	± 4.0%	51%	41%	2% (Note: Michael Addison (UC) with 1%; Walid Hakim (G) with 1%)	7%
Resonance Media	September 29 – October 3, 2026	638 (RV)	± 3.7%	45%	35%	4% (Note: Michael Addison (UC) with 3%; Walid Hakim (G) with 1%)	16%
Hart Research (D) (Note: Poll sponsored by Johnson's campaign)	August 12–15, 2026	600 (V)	—	50%	42%	—	8%
Public Policy Polling (D) (Note: Poll sponsored by the campaign of Annie Andrews, Democratic nominee for U.S. Senate)	July 16–17, 2026	577 (V)	—	45%	37%	—	17%

=== Results ===
2026 South Carolina gubernatorial election
Party	Candidate	Votes	%	±%
Republican	Alan Wilson; Mike Reichenbach	1,051,334	51.58	
Democratic	Jermaine Johnson; Sam Skardon	960,534	47.13	
United Citizens	Michael Addison; Candace Brewer	16,125	0.79	
Green	Walid Hakim; Arnold E. Karr	9,078	0.45	
Write-in		1,143	0.06	
Total votes		2,038,214	100.0	
Republican hold				

Counties that flipped from Republican to Democratic

- Berkeley (largest municipality: Goose Creek)
- Chester (largest municipality: Chester)
- Darlington (largest municipality: Hartsville)
- Dillon (largest municipality: Dillon)
- Dorchester (largest municipality: North Charleston)
- Florence (largest municipality: Florence)

==== By congressional district ====
Wilson won five congressional districts, including one that elected a Democrat, while Johnson won two congressional districts, including one that elected a Republican.

District	Wilson	Johnson	Representative elected
1st	51.55%	47.19%	Nancy Lacore
2nd	49.18%	49.57%	Joe Wilson
3rd	64.02%	34.75%	Sheri Biggs
4th	53.64%	45.08%	William Timmons
5th	52.89%	45.77%	Wes Climer
6th	31.46%	67.15%	Jim Clyburn
7th	57.02%	41.68%	Russell Fry

== See also ==
- 2026 United States gubernatorial elections
- 2026 South Carolina elections

== Notes ==
Partisan clients
