= Patrick Rooney =

Patrick Rooney may refer to:

- J. Patrick Rooney (1927–2008), American executive and activist
- Patrick Rooney (squash player) (born 1997), English squash player
- Patrick Rooney Jr. (born 1964), American politician

== See also ==
- Pat Rooney (disambiguation), various people
