= 2026 United States House of Representatives elections in South Carolina =

2026 United House of Representatives elections in South Carolina
- November 3, 2026

All 7 South Carolina seats to the United States House of Representatives
	Majority party	Minority party
Party	Republican	Democratic
Last election	6	1
Seats won	5	2
Seat change	▼1	▲1
Popular vote	1,030,996	1,008,238
Percentage	50.73%	48.13%
Swing	▼9.75%	▲8.62%

Republican hold
Democratic hold Democratic gain
Republican
40–50%
50–60%
60–70%
Democratic
40–50%
50–60%
60–70%
70–80%

The 2026 United States House of Representatives elections in South Carolina were held on November 3, 2026, to elect the seven U.S. representatives from the state of South Carolina, one from each of the state's congressional districts. The elections coincided with other elections to the House of Representatives, elections to the United States Senate, and various state and local elections. The primary elections took place on June 9, and in races where no candidate received over 50% in a primary, runoff elections took place on June 23.

== Failed redistricting attempt ==
=== Background ===
In June 2025, the South Carolina Supreme Court heard arguments in League of Women Voters v. Alexander, as to whether the congressional maps are an unlawful partisan gerrymander in violation of the state's constitution. In September 2025, the court ruled that partisan gerrymandering is not in violation of the state's constitution, repeatedly referencing the 2019 SCOTUS case Rucho v. Common Cause, leaving the current map in place.

Following the U.S. Supreme Court's decision in Louisiana v. Callais, Governor Henry McMaster called a special legislative session in May 2026 to consider redistricting and the state house approved a new map that would redraw the state's sole majority-minority district. However, the state senate ultimately voted against advancing the map after it became clear that passage would occur after the start of early voting in the state's primary election.

== Statewide polling ==
=== Statewide congressional polls ===
Poll source	Date(s) administered	Sample size (Note: Key: A – all adults RV – registered voters LV – likely voters V – unclear)	Margin of error	Republican	Democratic	Other	Undecided
The New York Times/Siena University	October 19–26, 2026	707 (LV)	± 4.3%	50%	41%	1% (Note: "The third-party candidate" with 1%)	7%

== Statewide results ==
=== Statewide ===
Party	Candi- dates	Votes		Seats		
Party	Candi- dates	No.	%	No.	+/–	%
Republican Party	7	1,030,996	50.73%	5	▼1	71.43%
Democratic Party	7	1,008,238	48.13%	2	▲1	28.57%
Libertarian Party	3	17,669	0.87%	0	Steady	0%
Other candidates	8	5,348	0.27%	0	Steady	0%
Total	28	2,032,136	100%	7	Steady	100%

Popular vote
Republican	50.73%
Democratic	48.13%
Libertarian	0.87%
Other	0.27%

House seats
Republican	71.43%
Democratic	28.57%

== District 1 ==
2026 South Carolina's 1st congressional district election

Nominee	Nancy Lacore	Jenny Costa Honeycutt
Party	Democratic	Republican
Popular vote	162,103	158,751
Percentage	49.66%	48.63%
- County results Lacore: 50–60% Honeycutt: 50–60%
U.S. Representative before election
Nancy Mace
Republican
Elected U.S. Representative
Nancy Lacore
Democratic

The 1st district straddles the Atlantic coast of the state, and includes most of Charleston. The incumbent is Republican Nancy Mace, who was re-elected with 58.2% of the vote in 2024. Mace announced her run for governor of South Carolina in 2026, but she was eliminated in the primary.

=== Republican primary ===
==== Nominee ====
- Jenny Costa Honeycutt, Charleston County councilor

==== Eliminated in runoff ====
- Mark Smith, state representative from the 99th district (2020–present)

==== Eliminated in primary ====
- Dan Brown, car dealer
- Jay Byars, Dorchester County councilor
- Logan Cunningham, Beaufort County councilor (2021–present) and candidate for this district in 2020
- Tyler Dykes, convicted participant in the January 6 United States Capitol attack
- Kendal Ludden, attorney
- Sam McCown, physician
- Alex Pelbath, commercial pilot
- Cindy Wagers Riley

==== Withdrawn ====
- Jack Ellison
- Mark Sanford, former governor of South Carolina (2003–2011), U.S. representative for this seat (1995–2001, 2013–2019), and candidate for president in 2020 (remained on ballot)

==== Declined ====
- Nancy Mace, incumbent U.S. representative (ran for governor)

==== Endorsements ====
Tyler Dykes

Organizations

- Anti-Zionist America PAC
Alex Pelbath

Organizations

- With Honor Fund
Mark Smith

U.S. senators

- Rick Santorum, former Pennsylvania (1995–2007)

U.S. representatives

- Henry Brown, former SC-01 (2001–2011)
- Thomas F. Hartnett, former SC-01 (1981–1987)

State legislators

- Davey Hiott, majority leader of the South Carolina House of Representatives (2022–present) from the 4th district (2004–present)
- Murrell Smith, speaker of the South Carolina House of Representatives (2022–present) from the 67th district (2000–present)

==== Fundraising ====
Italics indicate a withdrawn candidate.

Campaign finance reports as of May 20, 2026
Candidate	Raised	Spent	Cash on hand
Jay Byars (R)	$220,656	$191,732	$28,924
Logan Cunningham (R)	$29,454	$21,873	$7,580
Tyler Dykes (R)	$24,946	$23,331	$0
Jenny Costa Honeycutt (R)	$345,658	$217,239	$128,419
Sam McCown (R)	$1,579,846	$840,877	$738,969
Alex Pelbath (R)	$419,252	$276,795	$142,458
Mark Smith (R)	$750,711	$538,686	$212,025
Marshall Sanford (R)	$192,470	$22,431	$1,493,542
Source: Federal Election Commission

==== Polling ====
Poll source	Date(s) administered	Sample size	Margin of error	Logan Cunningham	Jenny Costa Honeycutt	Sam McCown	Alex Pelbath	Mark Smith	Other	Undecided
Pulse Decision Science (R) (Note: Poll sponsored by Honeycutt's campaign)	May 16–19, 2026	418 (LV)	± 4.8%	7%	20%	6%	6%	16%	8%	37%

==== Results ====
Republican primary results
Party	Candidate	Votes	%
Republican	Jenny Costa Honeycutt	14,822	22.1
Republican	Mark Smith	12,074	18.0
Republican	Sam McCown	10,508	15.7
Republican	Mark Sanford (withdrawn)	8,107	12.1
Republican	Alex Pelbath	7,288	10.9
Republican	Logan Cunningham	4,480	6.7
Republican	Jay Byars	4,265	6.4
Republican	Dan Brown	2,924	4.4
Republican	Cindy Wagers Riley	1,233	1.8
Republican	Tyler Dykes	943	1.4
Republican	Kendal Ludden	466	0.7
Total votes		67,110	100.0

==== Runoff ====
===== Polling =====
Poll source	Date(s) administered	Sample size	Margin of error	Jenny Costa Honeycutt	Mark Smith	Undecided
Meeting Street Insights (R) (Note: Poll sponsored by Winning for Women, which supports Honeycutt)	June 4–6, 2026	400 (LV)	± 4.9%	35%	28%	37%

===== Results =====
Republican primary runoff results
Party	Candidate	Votes	%
Republican	Jenny Costa Honeycutt	24,035	53.7
Republican	Mark Smith	20,724	46.3
Total votes		44,759	100.0

=== Democratic primary ===
==== Nominee ====
- Nancy Lacore, former chief of the U.S. Navy Reserve (2024–2025)

==== Eliminated in runoff ====
- Mac Deford, former Hilton Head Island general counsel and candidate for this district in 2024

==== Eliminated in primary ====
- Francina Dantzler, educator
- Max Diaz, aircraft mechanic
- Ben Frasier, businessman and perennial candidate
- Matt Fulmer, waiter
- Mayra Rivera-Vazquez, former second vice chair of the South Carolina Democratic Party

==== Withdrawn ====
- KJ Atwood, business owner (running for state house)

==== Endorsements ====
Max Diaz

Organizations

- Progressive Victory (co-endorsement with Fulmer)
Matt Fulmer

Organizations

- Progressive Victory (co-endorsement with Diaz)
Nancy Lacore

Local officials

- Will Haynie, mayor of Mount Pleasant (2017–present) (Republican)
- John Tecklenburg, mayor of Charleston (2016–2023)

Organizations

- Emily's List
- VoteVets

==== Fundraising ====
Campaign finance reports as of March 31, 2026
Candidate	Raised	Spent	Cash on hand
Nancy Lacore (D)	$1,029,275	$451,260	$578,014
Mac Deford (D)	$393,994	$253,436	$140,558
Mayra Rivera-Vazquez (D)	$117,676	$87,581	$31,791
KJ Atwood (D)	$19,483	$18,670	$813
Matthew Fulmer (D)	$8,200	$7,037	$1,173
Max Diaz (D)	$5,200	$4,748	$366
Source: Federal Election Commission

==== Results ====
Democratic primary results
Party	Candidate	Votes	%
Democratic	Nancy Lacore	20,643	36.5
Democratic	Mac Deford	16,348	28.9
Democratic	Francina Dantzler	5,425	9.6
Democratic	Mayra Rivera-Vazquez	5,411	9.6
Democratic	Ben Frasier	5,369	9.5
Democratic	Matt Fulmer	2,266	4.0
Democratic	Max Diaz	1,117	2.0
Total votes		56,579	100.0

==== Runoff ====
===== Results =====
Democratic primary runoff results
Party	Candidate	Votes	%
Democratic	Nancy Lacore	12,825	52.1
Democratic	Mac Deford	11,773	47.9
Total votes		24,598	100.0

=== Libertarian primary ===
==== Nominee ====
- Bill Reeside, nuclear engineer

=== Alliance primary ===
==== Nominee ====
- Margo Ellis, comedian

=== General election ===
==== Predictions ====
Source	Ranking	As of
Decision Desk HQ	Lean R	September 25, 2026
The Cook Political Report	Tossup	October 30, 2026
Inside Elections	Tilt R	October 29, 2026
Sabato's Crystal Ball	Lean R	October 20, 2026

==== Post-primary endorsements ====
Jenny Costa Honeycutt (R)

Executive branch officials

- Donald Trump, president of the United States (2017–2021, 2025–present)
Nancy Lacore (D)

U.S. senators

- Mark Kelly, Arizona (2020–present)

U.S. representatives

- Suzan DelBene, WA-01 (2012–present)
- Adam Gray, CA-13 (2025–present)
- Greg Stanton, AZ-04 (2019–present)

Statewide officials

- Mikie Sherrill, governor of New Jersey (2026–present)

Labor unions

- National Education Association

Organizations

- Blue Dog PAC
- DCCC Red to Blue
- NewDem Action Fund

Newspapers

- The Post and Courier

==== Fundraising ====
Campaign finance reports as of October 14, 2026
Candidate	Raised	Spent	Cash on hand
Jenny Costa Honeycutt (R)	$1,291,996	$980,478	$311,518
Nancy Lacore (D)	$4,865,630	$4,690,325	$175,304
Source: Federal Election Commission

==== Polling ====
Poll source	Date(s) administered	Sample size	Margin of error	Jenny Costa Honeycutt (R)	Nancy Lacore (D)	Bill Reeside Jr. (L)	Other	Undecided
Public Policy Polling (D) (Note: Poll sponsored by House Majority PAC, which is focused on electing Democrats to the U.S. House of Representatives)	October 21–22, 2026	770 (LV)	–	45%	47%	–	8%	
GQR (D)	September 30 – October 4, 2026	400 (LV)	–	45%	48%	–	7%	
co/efficient (R) (Note: Poll sponsored by Thank You For Your Attention To This Matter PAC, which supports Honeycutt)	September 30 – October 1, 2026	837 (LV)	± 3.37%	46%	40%	4%	—	9%
Public Policy Polling (D) (Note: Poll sponsored by The Bench, which supports Lacore)	September 9–10, 2026	536 (RV)	± 4.2%	41%	40%	—	—	19%
GQR (D)	July 15–22, 2026	400 (LV)	—	50%	48%	—	—	2%
GQR (D)	July 15–22, 2026	400 (LV)	—	43%	41%	5%	2% (Note: Margo Ellis and "Another candidate" with 1%)	9%

Hypothetical polling

Mark Smith vs. Mac Deford

Poll source	Date(s) administered	Sample size	Margin of error	Mark Smith (R)	Mac Deford (D)	Undecided
Public Policy Polling (D) (Note: Poll sponsored by Deford's campaign)	December 5–6, 2025	645 (LV)	± 3.9%	39%	36%	25%

Generic Republican vs. generic Democrat

Poll source	Date(s) administered	Sample size	Margin of error	Generic Republican	Generic Democrat	Undecided
Public Policy Polling (D)	September 9–10, 2026	536 (RV)	± 4.2%	48%	42%	10%

==== Results ====
2026 South Carolina's 1st congressional district election
Party	Candidate	Votes	%
Democratic	Nancy Lacore	162,103	49.66%
Republican	Jenny Costa Honeycutt	158,751	48.63%
Libertarian	Bill Reeside Jr.	5,351	1.64%
Write-in		218	0.07%
Total votes		326,423	100.0
Democratic gain from Republican			

== District 2 ==
2026 South Carolina's 2nd congressional district election
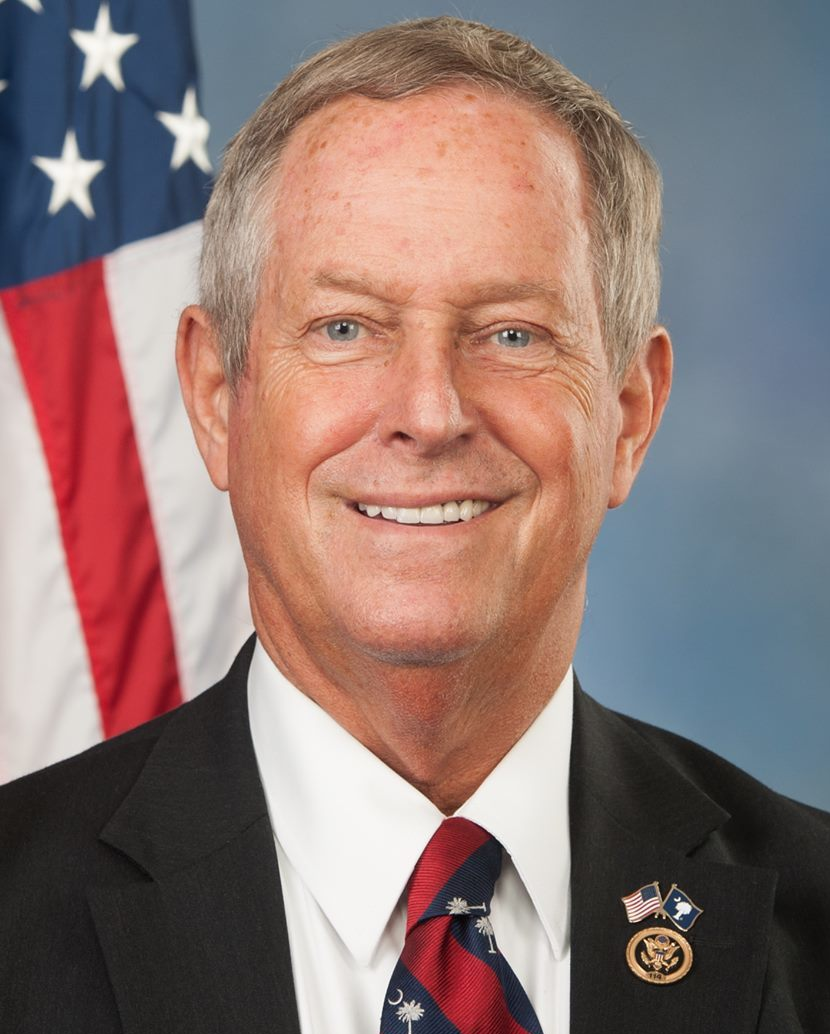

Nominee	Joe Wilson	Zyon Khalifa
Party	Republican	Democratic
Popular vote	147,791	144,865
Percentage	49.82%	48.83%
- County results Wilson: 50–60% Khalifa: 50–60% 60–70%
U.S. Representative before election
Joe Wilson
Republican
Elected U.S. Representative
Joe Wilson
Republican

The 2nd district is located in central South Carolina and spans from Columbia to the South Carolina side of the Augusta, Georgia metropolitan area, including North Augusta. The incumbent is Republican Joe Wilson, who was re-elected with 59.5% of the vote in 2024.

=== Republican primary ===
==== Nominee ====
- Joe Wilson, incumbent U.S. representative

==== Eliminated in primary ====
- Sam Gibbons, Marine veteran
- Hamp Redmond, building contractor

==== Endorsements ====
Joe Wilson

Executive branch officials

- Donald Trump, president of the United States (2017–2021, 2025–present)

Organizations

- AIPAC

==== Fundraising ====
Campaign finance reports as of March 31, 2026
Candidate	Raised	Spent	Cash on hand
Hamp Redmond (R)	$13,549	$11,869	$1,704
Joe Wilson (R)	$669,269	$419,825	$293,956
Source: Federal Election Commission

==== Results ====
Republican primary results
Party	Candidate	Votes	%
Republican	Joe Wilson (incumbent)	46,588	74.2
Republican	Hamp Redmond	8,731	13.9
Republican	Sam Gibbons	7,440	11.9
Total votes		62,759	100.0

=== Democratic primary ===
==== Nominee ====
- Zyon Khalifa, attorney and Air Force veteran

==== Eliminated in runoff ====
- David Robinson, businessman, father of Daniel Robinson, and nominee for this district in 2024

==== Eliminated in primary ====
- Roger Pruitt, attorney
- Daniel Shrief, Army veteran and insurance adjuster

==== Fundraising ====
Campaign finance reports as of March 31, 2026
Candidate	Raised	Spent	Cash on hand
Roger Pruitt (D)	$24,019	$22,830	$1,188
David Robinson (D)	$4,348	$5,146	$1,688
Source: Federal Election Commission

==== Results ====
Democratic primary results
Party	Candidate	Votes	%
Democratic	David Robinson	24,063	41.0
Democratic	Zyon Khalifa	19,992	34.1
Democratic	Roger Pruitt	11,706	20.0
Democratic	Daniel Shrief	2,888	4.9
Total votes		58,649	100.0

==== Runoff ====
===== Results =====
Democratic primary runoff results
Party	Candidate	Votes	%
Democratic	Zyon Khalifa	3,069	53.8
Democratic	David Robinson	2,636	46.2
Total votes		5,705	100.0

=== Workers primary ===
==== Nominee ====
- Dayna Alane Smith

=== General election ===
==== Predictions ====
Source	Ranking	As of
Decision Desk HQ	Likely R	July 14, 2026
The Cook Political Report	Solid R	June 25, 2025
Inside Elections	Solid R	June 25, 2025
Sabato's Crystal Ball	Safe R	June 25, 2025

==== Fundraising ====
Campaign finance reports as of June 3, 2026
Candidate	Raised	Spent	Cash on hand
Joe Wilson (R)	$762,822	$601,446	$205,889
Zyon Khalifa (D)	$6,220	$7,056	$-836
Source: Federal Election Commission

==== Results ====
2026 South Carolina's 2nd congressional district election
Party	Candidate	Votes	%
Republican	Joe Wilson (incumbent)	147,791	49.82%
Democratic	Zyon Khalifa	144,865	48.83%
SCWP	Dayna Alane Smith	3,674	1.24%
Write-in		334	0.11%
Total votes		296,664	100.0
Republican hold			

== District 3 ==
2026 South Carolina's 3rd congressional district election
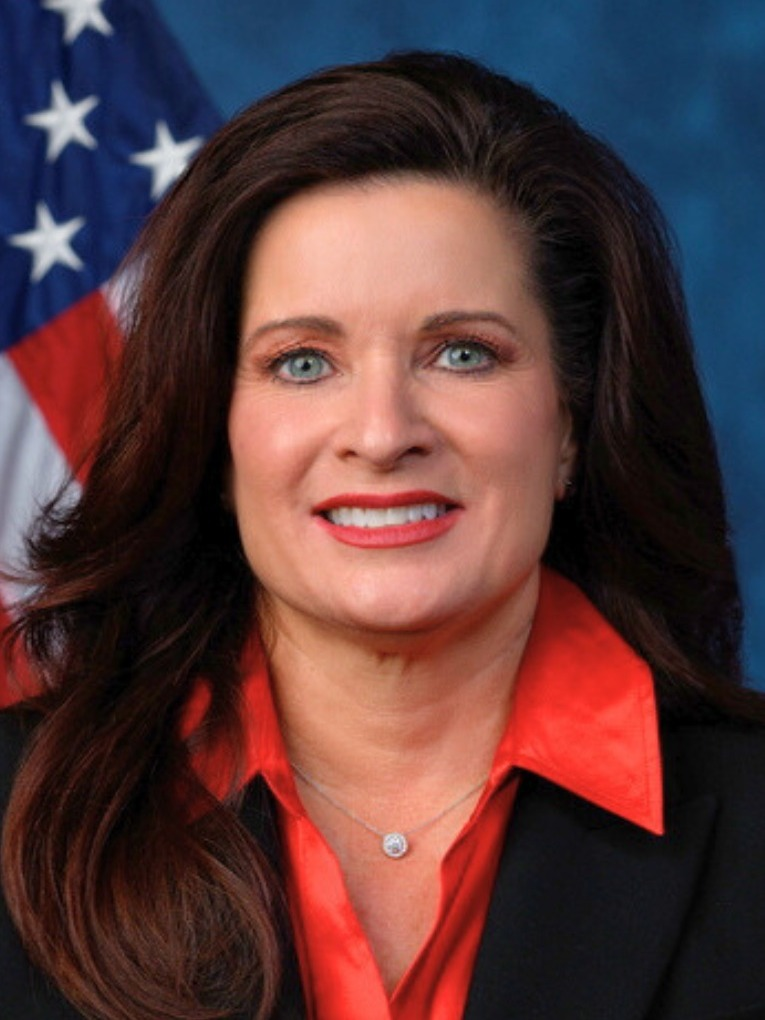

Nominee	Sheri Biggs	Eunice Lehmacher
Party	Republican	Democratic
Popular vote	173,960	93,955
Percentage	63.68%	34.39%
- County results Biggs: 50–60% 60–70%
U.S. Representative before election
Sheri Biggs
Republican
Elected U.S. Representative
Sheri Biggs
Republican

The 3rd district takes in the Piedmont area in northwestern South Carolina, including Anderson and Greenwood. Incumbent Republican Sheri Biggs, who was elected with 71.7% of the vote in 2024, is running for re-election.

=== Republican primary ===
==== Nominee ====
- Sheri Biggs, incumbent U.S. representative

==== Endorsements ====
Sheri Biggs

Executive branch officials

- Donald Trump, president of the United States (2017–2021, 2025–present)

Organizations

- AIPAC
- Freedom Caucus Fund

==== Fundraising ====
Campaign finance reports as of March 31, 2026
Candidate	Raised	Spent	Cash on hand
Sheri Biggs (R)	$400,543	$293,577	$211,051
Source: Federal Election Commission

=== Democratic primary ===
==== Nominee ====
- Eunice Lehmacher, social worker and nominee for state representative in 2020 and 2024

==== Eliminated in primary ====
- Ernest Mackins, educator and nominee for state representative in 2022

==== Fundraising ====
Campaign finance reports as of March 31, 2026
Candidate	Raised	Spent	Cash on hand
Eunice Lehmacher (D)	$19,123	$8,537	$10,586
Source: Federal Election Commission

==== Results ====
Democratic primary results
Party	Candidate	Votes	%
Democratic	Eunice Lehmacher	16,730	53.4
Democratic	Ernest Mackins	14,612	46.6
Total votes		31,342	100.0

=== Libertarian convention ===
==== Nominee ====
Brian Corriea, Navy veteran

=== General election ===
==== Predictions ====
Source	Ranking	As of
Decision Desk HQ	Safe R	July 14, 2026
The Cook Political Report	Solid R	June 25, 2025
Inside Elections	Solid R	June 25, 2025
Sabato's Crystal Ball	Safe R	June 25, 2025

==== Post-primary endorsements ====
Sheri Biggs (R)

Organizations

- U.S. Chamber of Commerce
Eunice Lehmacher (D)

Organizations

- National Women's Political Caucus

==== Fundraising ====
Campaign finance reports as of May 13, 2026
Candidate	Raised	Spent	Cash on hand
Sheri Biggs (R)	$418,427	$348,018	$174,495
Eunice Lehmacher (D)	$30,047	$15,254	$14,792
Source: Federal Election Commission

==== Results ====
2026 South Carolina's 3rd congressional district election
Party	Candidate	Votes	%
Republican	Sheri Biggs (incumbent)	173,960	63.68%
Democratic	Eunice Lehmacher	93,955	34.39%
Libertarian	Brian Corriea	5,103	1.87%
Write-in		150	0.05%
Total votes		273,168	100.0
Republican hold			

== District 4 ==
2026 South Carolina's 4th congressional district election

Nominee	William Timmons	Courtney McClain
Party	Republican	Democratic
Popular vote	146,944	129,742
Percentage	51.71%	45.65%
- County results Timmons: 50–60%
U.S. Representative before election
William Timmons
Republican
Elected U.S. Representative
William Timmons
Republican

The 4th district is located in Upstate South Carolina, taking in Greenville and Spartanburg. The incumbent is Republican William Timmons, who was re-elected with 59.7% of the vote in 2024.

=== Republican primary ===
==== Nominee ====
- William Timmons, incumbent U.S. representative

==== Eliminated in primary ====
- David Atchley, consulting firm owner
- Robert Lee, mechanical engineer

==== Endorsements ====
William Timmons

Executive branch officials

- Donald Trump, president of the United States (2017–2021, 2025–present)

Organizations

- AIPAC

==== Fundraising ====
Campaign finance reports as of March 31, 2026
Candidate	Raised	Spent	Cash on hand
David Atchley (R)	$139,427	$88,729	$50,697
William Timmons (R)	$829,479	$559,761	$289,832
Source: Federal Election Commission

==== Results ====
Republican primary results
Party	Candidate	Votes	%
Republican	William Timmons (incumbent)	47,895	65.8
Republican	David Atchley	14,188	19.5
Republican	Robert Lee	10,663	14.7
Total votes		72,746	100.0

=== Democratic primary ===
==== Nominee ====
- Courtney McClain, political organizer

==== Fundraising ====
Campaign finance reports as of March 31, 2026
Candidate	Raised	Spent	Cash on hand
Courtney McClain (D)	$17,509	$20,040	$0
Source: Federal Election Commission

=== Libertarian primary ===
==== Nominee ====
- Jessica Ethridge, nominee for lieutenant governor in 2022

=== General election ===
==== Predictions ====
Source	Ranking	As of
Decision Desk HQ	Safe R	July 14, 2026
The Cook Political Report	Solid R	June 25, 2025
Inside Elections	Solid R	June 25, 2025
Sabato's Crystal Ball	Safe R	June 25, 2025

=== Post-primary endorsements ===
Courtney McClain (D)

Political parties

- South Carolina Working Families Party

Labor unions

- National Education Association

Organizations

- National Women's Political Caucus

==== Fundraising ====
Campaign finance reports as of May 13, 2026
Candidate	Raised	Spent	Cash on hand
William Timmons (R)	$1,431,549	$790,311	$661,353
Courtney McClain (D)	$17,510	$20,040	$-2,531
Source: Federal Election Commission

==== Results ====
2026 South Carolina's 4th congressional district election
Party	Candidate	Votes	%
Republican	William Timmons (incumbent)	146,944	51.71%
Democratic	Courtney McClain	129,742	45.65%
Libertarian	Jessica Ethridge	7,215	2.54%
Write-in		292	0.10%
Total votes		284,193	100.0
Republican hold			

== District 5 ==
2026 South Carolina's 5th congressional district election

Nominee	Wes Climer	Mallory Dittmer
Party	Republican	Democratic
Popular vote	151,497	135,203
Percentage	52.81%	47.13%
- County results Climer: 50–60% 60–70% Dittmer: 50–60% 60–70%
U.S. Representative before election
Ralph Norman
Republican
Elected U.S. Representative
Wes Climer
Republican

The 5th district is located in northern South Carolina and encompasses the southern suburbs and exurbs of Charlotte, including Rock Hill. The incumbent is Republican Ralph Norman, who was re-elected with 63.5% of the vote in 2024. On July 25, 2025, Norman filed to run for governor of South Carolina in 2026.

=== Republican primary ===
==== Nominee ====
- Wes Climer, state senator from the 15th district (2016–present)

==== Withdrawn ====
- Bill Bledsoe, veterinarian and perennial candidate

==== Declined ====
- Ralph Norman, incumbent U.S. representative (ran for governor, later ran for U.S. Senate, endorsed Climer)

==== Endorsements ====
Wes Climer

U.S. representatives

- Ralph Norman, U.S. representative from South Carolina's 5th congressional district (2017−present)

==== Fundraising ====
Italics indicate a withdrawn candidate.

Campaign finance reports as of March 31, 2026
Candidate	Raised	Spent	Cash on hand
Bill Bledsoe (R)	$50,003	$50,000	$8
Wes Climer (R)	$757,622	$237,201	$520,421
Source: Federal Election Commission

=== Democratic primary ===
==== Nominee ====
- Mallory Dittmer, branding consultant

==== Eliminated in primary ====
- Andrew Clough, airline worker

==== Fundraising ====
Campaign finance reports as of March 31, 2026
Candidate	Raised	Spent	Cash on hand
Mallory Dittmer (D)	$80,511	$34,860	$45,651
Alex Harper (D)	$23,136	$22,538	$598
Source: Federal Election Commission

==== Results ====
Democratic primary results
Party	Candidate	Votes	%
Democratic	Mallory Dittmer	25,428	55.8
Democratic	Andrew Clough	20,138	44.2
Total votes		45,566	100.0

=== Forward Party primary ===
==== Nominee ====
- Andy Kaplan, healthcare executive

=== General election ===
==== Predictions ====
Source	Ranking	As of
Decision Desk HQ	Safe R	November 3, 2026
The Cook Political Report	Solid R	June 25, 2025
Inside Elections	Solid R	June 25, 2025
Sabato's Crystal Ball	Safe R	June 25, 2025

==== Post-primary endorsements ====
Wes Climer (R)

Organizations

- U.S. Chamber of Commerce
Mallory Dittmer (D)

Labor unions

- National Education Association

==== Fundraising ====
Campaign finance reports as of May 13, 2026
Candidate	Raised	Spent	Cash on hand
Wes Climer (R)	$790,548	$271,164	$519,835
Mallory Dittmer (D)	$116,655	$54,706	$61,950
Source: Federal Election Commission

==== Results ====
2026 South Carolina's 5th congressional district election
Party	Candidate	Votes	%
Republican	Wes Climer	151,497	52.81%
Democratic	Mallory Dittmer	135,203	47.13%
Write-in		158	0.06%
Total votes		286,858	100.0
Republican hold			

== District 6 ==
2026 South Carolina's 6th congressional district election
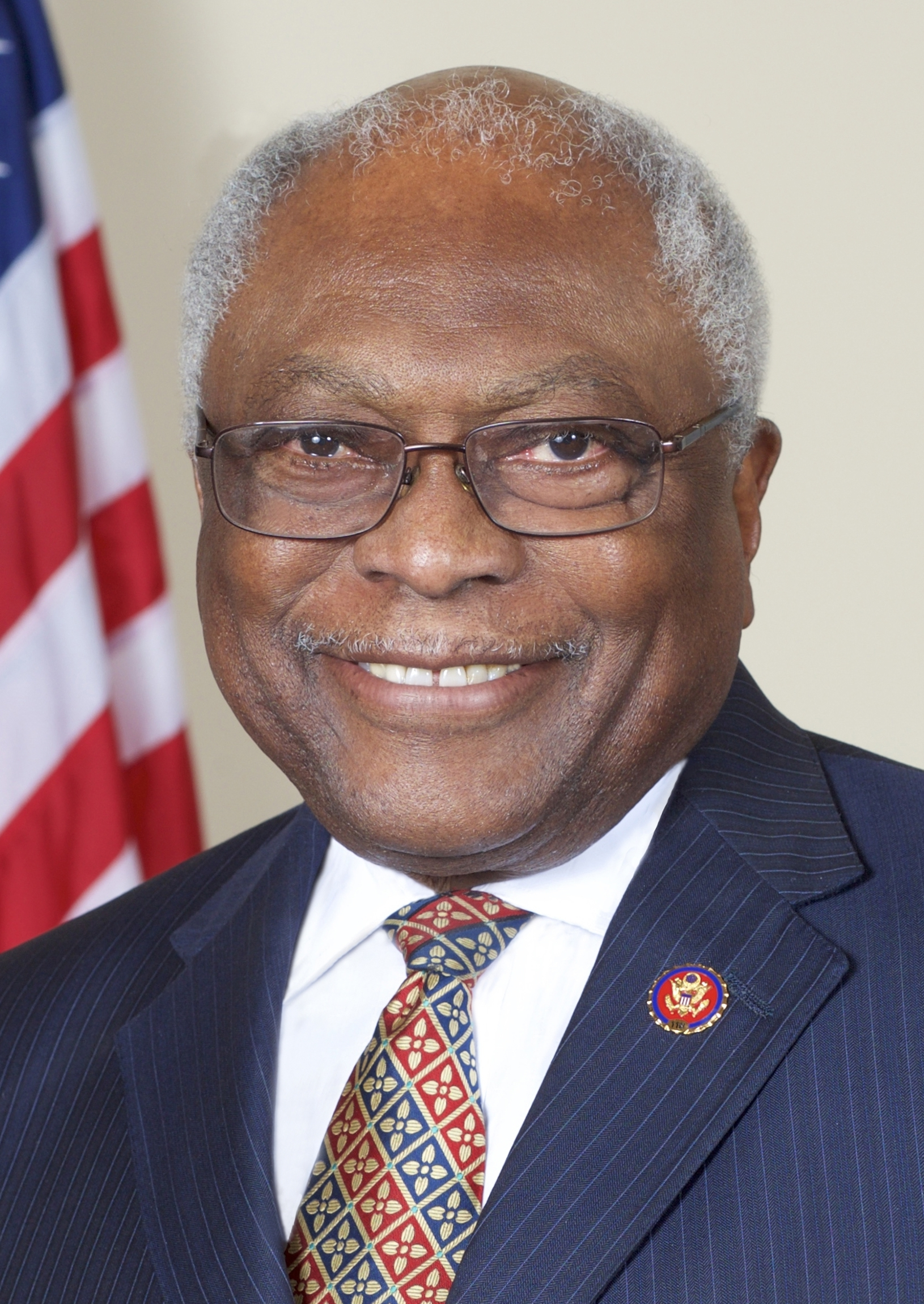

Nominee	Jim Clyburn	John Peterson
Party	Democratic	Republican
Popular vote	180,840	79,584
Percentage	69.36%	30.52%
- County results Clyburn: 50–60% 60–70% 70–80% 80–90% Peterson: 50–60%
U.S. Representative before election
Jim Clyburn
Democratic
Elected U.S. Representative
Jim Clyburn
Democratic

The 6th district runs through the Black Belt and takes in Columbia and North Charleston. The incumbent is Democrat Jim Clyburn, who was re-elected with 59.5% of the vote in 2024.

=== Democratic primary ===
==== Nominee ====
- Jim Clyburn, incumbent U.S. representative

==== Eliminated in primary ====
- Frederick Goodwin, maintenance technician

==== Endorsements ====
Jim Clyburn

Labor unions

- American Federation of Government Employees

Organizations

- Planned Parenthood Action Fund

==== Fundraising ====
Campaign finance reports as of March 31, 2026
Candidate	Raised	Spent	Cash on hand
Jim Clyburn (D)	$2,600,366	$1,206,725	$1,405,768
Source: Federal Election Commission

==== Results ====
Democratic primary results
Party	Candidate	Votes	%
Democratic	Jim Clyburn (incumbent)	75,411	90.3
Democratic	Frederick Goodwin	8,145	9.7
Total votes		83,556	100.0

=== Republican primary ===
==== Nominee ====
- John Peterson, president of the Deer Park 1B precinct in the Charleston County Republican Party

==== Eliminated in primary ====
- Maurice Washington, former chair of the Charleston County Republican Party

==== Results ====
Republican primary results
Party	Candidate	Votes	%
Republican	John Peterson	22,169	74.0
Republican	Maurice Washington	7,781	26.0
Total votes		29,950	100.0

=== Alliance primary ===
==== Nominee ====
- Joseph Oddo, consultant

=== General election ===
==== Predictions ====
Source	Ranking	As of
Decision Desk HQ	Safe D	July 14, 2026
The Cook Political Report	Solid D	June 25, 2025
Inside Elections	Solid D	June 25, 2025
Sabato's Crystal Ball	Safe D	June 25, 2025

==== Post-primary endorsements ====
Jim Clyburn (D)

Labor unions

- National Education Association

Organizations

- Giffords

==== Fundraising ====
Campaign finance reports as of May 13, 2026
Candidate	Raised	Spent	Cash on hand
Jim Clyburn (D)	$881,796	$1,282,169	$1,438,754
John Peterson (R)	$0	$0	$0
Source: Federal Election Commission

==== Results ====
2026 South Carolina's 6th congressional district election
Party	Candidate	Votes	%
Democratic	Jim Clyburn (incumbent)	180,840	69.36%
Republican	John Peterson	79,584	30.52%
Write-in		318	0.12%
Total votes		260,742	100.0
Democratic hold			

== District 7 ==
2026 South Carolina's 7th congressional district election

Nominee	Russell Fry	John Vincent
Party	Republican	Democratic
Popular vote	172,439	131,445
Percentage	56.71%	43.23%
- County results Fry: 50–60% 60–70% Vincent: 50–60% 60–70%
U.S. Representative before election
Russell Fry
Republican
Elected U.S. Representative
Russell Fry
Republican

The 7th district is located in northeastern South Carolina, taking in Myrtle Beach and Florence. The incumbent is Republican Russell Fry, who was re-elected with 64.9% of the vote in 2024.

=== Republican primary ===
==== Nominee ====
- Russell Fry, incumbent U.S. representative

==== Endorsements ====
Russell Fry

Organizations

- AIPAC

==== Fundraising ====
Campaign finance reports as of March 31, 2026
Candidate	Raised	Spent	Cash on hand
Russell Fry (R)	$1,438,660	$1,011,930	$987,912
Source: Federal Election Commission

=== Democratic primary ===
==== Nominee ====
- John Vincent, retiree

==== Fundraising ====
Campaign finance reports as of March 31, 2026
Candidate	Raised	Spent	Cash on hand
John Vincent (D)	$211,640	$157,291	$54,349
Source: Federal Election Commission

=== Independents ===
==== Filed paperwork ====
- Carter Gibson-Grossmann
- Jaquelyn Graham

=== General election ===
==== Predictions ====
Source	Ranking	As of
Decision Desk HQ	Safe R	July 14, 2026
The Cook Political Report	Solid R	June 25, 2025
Inside Elections	Solid R	June 25, 2025
Sabato's Crystal Ball	Safe R	June 25, 2025

==== Post-primary endorsements ====
Russell Fry (R)

Organizations

- U.S. Chamber of Commerce

==== Fundraising ====
Campaign finance reports as of May 13, 2026
Candidate	Raised	Spent	Cash on hand
Russell Fry (R)	$1,584,042	$1,187,907	$957,318
John Vincent (D)	$234,953	$208,271	$26,682
Source: Federal Election Commission

==== Polling ====
Poll source	Date(s) administered	Sample size	Margin of error	Russell Fry (R)	John Vincent (D)	Undecided
Blueprint Polling (D) (Note: Poll sponsored by Vincent's campaign)	July 27–28, 2026	557 (LV)	—	41%	37%	22%

==== Results ====
2026 South Carolina's 7th congressional district election
Party	Candidate	Votes	%
Republican	Russell Fry (incumbent)	172,439	56.71%
Democratic	John Vincent	131,445	43.23%
Write-in		204	0.07%
Total votes		304,088	100.0
Republican hold			

== See also ==
- 2026 South Carolina elections
- 2026 United States House of Representatives elections
- 2026 South Carolina House of Representatives election
