= Federation of American Consumers and Travelers =

U.S. nonprofit organization

The Federation of American Consumers and Travelers (FACT) is a nonprofit organization and consumer group based in Edwardsville, Illinois, United States. Membership includes I.D. Theft and Cyber Security, online fitness and wellness classes, Accidental Death Coverage, scholarships, community and classroom grants, assistance for small business owners, travel discounts and more.

There are two FACT membership payment preferences: $10 per month or $100 for a year's membership.

Membership in FACT was required to buy certain health insurance products by Golden Rule Insurance Company.

FACT was formed in 1984 under the not-for-profit corporation laws of the District of Columbia. It has a governing board of directors with four members, who are elected annually by a vote of regular members. Reporting directly to the board of directors are its 4 officers and a managing director, all of whom are volunteers. Day-to-day administrative, management and marketing responsibilities are entirely outsourced to companies that specialize in their respective fields.
