= Darcy Olsen =

American nonprofit executive

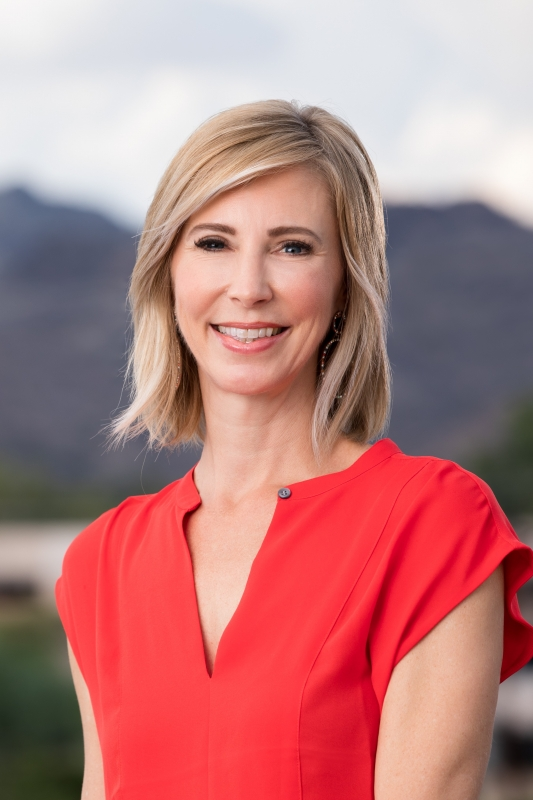
- Education: Georgetown University; New York University

Darcy Olsen is the founder and CEO of the Center for the Rights of Abused Children.

== Early life and education ==
Darcy Ann Olsen was born in Bennington, Vermont. Olsen attended high school in St. George, Utah, where she was active in student groups. In 1993, Olsen earned a B.S. degree from the School of Foreign Service at Georgetown University. Then she enrolled in graduate school at New York University. She earned a master's degree in international education.

== Career ==
Olsen founded the Center for the Rights of Abused Children in 2017. Its mission is to "protect children, change laws and inspire people – to ensure every abused child has a safe and loving home". The organization provides reform blueprints and public interest litigation services to extend constitutional rights to abused children nationwide. The Center estimates they’ve helped 500,000 foster children. They have been involved with enacting Arizona state and federal legislation to provide foster children with free photo identification, establishing guidelines so children’s family members can more quickly be reunified, limiting delays in foster children’s court cases, and appointing an attorney to every child in foster care. The Center also has a Pro Bono Children’s Law Clinic that serves children and teens in foster care at its headquarters in Phoenix, Arizona. The Center for the Rights of Abused Children is a 501(c)3 organization and a Qualifying Foster Care Charitable Organization. GuideStar has awarded the Center for the Rights of Abused Children its Platinum Seal of Transparency.

From 2001 - 2017, she served as CEO of the Goldwater Institute. There, she wrote “The Right to Try,” that resulted in a national law giving people with terminal illnesses the right to try investigational medicines.

== Honors and awards ==
In 2023, readers of the Arizona Capitol Times voted Olsen as Arizona’s Best Non-Profit Leader, and the newspaper named her a Leader of the Year in Public Policy. In 2022, the Arizona Capitol Times named Olsen a Leader of the Year for improving the quality of life for abused children. In 2020, the U.S. Department of Health and Human Services honored Olsen with its Adoption Excellence Award for helping children get adopted. In 2020, she was named an Angel in Adoption by the Congressional Coalition on Adoption Institute, and she was recognized by the Arizona Capitol Times for her leadership during the pandemic. In 2019, Olsen was the first winner of the Gregor G. Peterson Prize in Venture Philanthropy.

She was named one of Arizona's top Women in Public Policy and one of the Phoenix Business Journal's Power Players in 2006, and one of Phoenix's Forty Under 40 in 2009. She also received the Roe Award, offered by the State Policy Network for outstanding achievements. In 2014, she received the Bradley Prize, awarded each year by the Bradley Foundation.

== Personal life ==
Olsen has four children, all of whom she adopted through the foster care system as a single mother.
