= Thomas A. Roe =

American businessman and conservative philanthropist (1927–2000)

Thomas A. Roe

Thomas Anderson Roe Jr. (1927–2000) was an American businessman, philanthropist, and conservative activist.

== Early life and education ==
Roe was born in 1927 in Greenville, South Carolina. He graduated from Furman University in 1948, and worked as a research assistant in their cancer center, which was sponsored by a grant from the Carnegie Foundation. He received a business degree from La Salle Extension University and a certificate in advanced studies from the Brookings Institution Program on Urban Policy.

== Career ==
In 1961, he inherited the Citizens Lumber Company from his late father, and renamed it Builder Marts of America. It became a Forbes 500 company. It was later purchased by Guardian Industries. He started a telecommunications company for long-distance calls, later purchased by MCI Inc. He also served as vice president of American Holdings, a firm with ice cream, refrigerator, and furniture manufacturing interests in the United States, along with land holding and air cargo operations in the Dominican Republic.

=== Politics ===
He served as vice chairman and finance chairman of the South Carolina Republican Party, and a member of the Republican National Finance Committee. He was a delegate to the 1964 Republican National Convention, where he supported Barry Goldwater. Later, he became an advisor to Ronald Reagan.

=== Philanthropy ===
Roe served on the boards of The Heritage Foundation, the Intercollegiate Studies Institute, the Free Congress Foundation, the Council for National Policy, the International Policy Forum, and the now-defunct National Empowerment Television. In 1986, he founded the South Carolina Policy Council, a free-market think tank. By 1992, the State Policy Network (SPN) was born. The Roe Award, awarded by the State Policy Network, is named for him. He received the Clare Boothe Luce Award from The Heritage Foundation in 1999.

He founded the Roe Foundation. Its board includes his wife Shirley Roe (chairman), Edwin Feulner (vice chairman; chairman of the Heritage Foundation), Carl Helstrom (chairman of the SPN), Tracie Sharp (former president of the State Policy Network, and Thomas Willcox, his son-in-law. Should the foundation stray from free-market principles, the bylaws of the Mont Pelerin Society and the Philadelphia Society give authorization to sue to protect Roe's original intent.

The Thomas A. Roe Institute for Economic Policy Studies at The Heritage Foundation is named for him.

Roe also donated to the South Carolina Medical Association, the Greenville Symphony Orchestra, and the Peace Center. His donations to his alma mater, Furman University, led to the construction of The Thomas Anderson Roe Building on its campus, named in his honor. He received an honorary doctorate of laws degree from Furman University in 1980 and the Order of the Palmetto of the State of South Carolina in 1995.

=== Personal life ===
He was married to Shirley Roe. They attended the Christ Episcopal Church in Greenville, South Carolina. He died in 2000.
