= Jon Caldara =

American libertarian activist

- Born: Trenton, New Jersey, U.S.
- Occupation: President of the Independence Institute

Jon Caldara is an American libertarian activist who serves as the president of the Independence Institute. He is a radio host and hosts a current events show, Devil's Advocate with Jon Caldara, that airs on KBDI-TV PBS 12 in Denver, Colorado.

== Early life and education ==
Caldara was born in Trenton, New Jersey. His family moved to Colorado when he was six years old. He graduated from Heritage High School in Littleton, Colorado, and then the University of Colorado Boulder in Boulder. As a University of Colorado Boulder student, he drew a comic strip called B Street. After college, Caldara worked as a roadie setting up stage equipment for rock bands. He later started a stage lighting business.

== Career ==
Caldara was elected to the board of directors for the Regional Transportation District, and eventually became its chairman. In 1998, he replaced Tom Tancredo as president of the Independence Institute, a Colorado think tank.

When the Colorado legislature relaxed voter registration requirements to allow people to register in a jurisdiction if they declared their intent to move there, Caldara objected. He then tested the law by declaring his intent to move to Colorado Springs, in order to vote in a recall election there. In September 2013, Caldara cast a blank ballot, but never moved to Colorado Springs, although he sublet a room there for a brief time.

Colorado Attorney General John Suthers investigated Caldara for voting fraud, but chose not to prosecute him. Suthers called the incident "suspicious," and said that it was questionable that Caldara ever intended to become an El Paso County resident. Suthers noted "arguable ambiguity” in the same-day voter law, and took no action. In January 2014, Caldara said, "I told you what I did was legal, neener-neener-neener."

From 2016 through 2020, Caldara wrote a weekly column for The Denver Post.

In January 2020, Jon Caldara was dismissed by the Denver Post, for what he felt were his politically incorrect statements on transgender rights, which had been reflected repeatedly in the media, and his voicing his concerns the ensuring of inclusivity comes at the price of sacrificing the right to free speech. This view was contradicted by the Denver Post’s editor on January 17, 2020. On February 1, 2020, it became public that Caldara had been employed as a columnist by The Gazette.

In March 2020, Caldara called on Colorado Governor Jared Polis for the suspension or reversal of the ban on single-use plastic or paper bags, as these, compared to reusable, and more emissions-intensive, bags produced in China, would lower the public health risk possibly without any adverse environmental effect.

== Personal life ==
Caldara is the father of three children, one of whom died of cancer when she was one year old. His son has Down syndrome.

== See also ==
- Roe Award
