= Cascade Policy Institute =

American libertarian think tank in Oregon

- Established: 1991; 35 years ago
- Focus: Issues of policy (state and local) for Oregon
- President and CEO: John A. Charles Jr.
- Budget: Revenue: $1.17 million Expenses: $832,000 (FYE December 2024)
- Address: 4850 SW Scholls Ferry Rd., S-103; Portland, Oregon 97225
- Coordinates: 45.4846°N 122.7515°W
- Interactive map of Cascade Policy Institute
- Website: cascadepolicy.org

Cascade Policy Institute is a non-profit and non-partisan American libertarian think tank based in Oregon that focuses on state and local issues. Founded in 1991, the institute advocates limited government in cost and size, and promotes privatization and other free market alternatives to government services. Cascade is a member of the State Policy Network, a network of conservative and libertarian think tanks in the United States and Canada.

== Background ==
The institute was incorporated in January 1991, with the mission of "promoting public policies fostering individual liberty, personal responsibility, and economic opportunity." Steve Buckstein, a former investment broker influenced by the libertarian ideas of Milton Friedman, founded Cascade Policy Institute after leading a 1989 ballot initiative to introduce school choice to Oregon, which failed. Co-founders of the institute included David Gore and Bill Udy, who served as the organization's first board members, along with Buckstein. Tracie Sharp, president of the State Policy Network, was also a co-founder of Cascade Policy Institute.

Buckstein led the organization as president until 2004, when he was succeeded by John A. Charles Jr. as president and CEO. Charles was previously the environmental policy director at Cascade Policy Institute. Before joining Cascade, he was the executive director at the Oregon Environmental Council, where he worked as a lobbyist for 17 years.

== Funding ==
In 1997, Cascade said it had more than 800 private donors, including individuals and corporations. Between 2007 and 2011, Cascade Policy Institute received $4.38 million in grants and donations.

== Programs ==
Cascade publishes background reports and policy studies, which it encourages Oregon lawmakers to read and cite, and hosts conferences and forums. Issues they discuss include transportation, right-to-work laws, health care, education, land use, economic opportunity for small businesses, tax and budget policies, and the environment.

=== Children's Scholarship Fund–Oregon ===
The Children's Scholarship Fund–Oregon (CSF-Oregon) is a program run by the Cascade Policy Institute, and is affiliated with the national Children's Scholarship Fund (CSF) network. Kathryn Hickock, executive vice president at Cascade Policy Institute, also serves as director of CSF-Oregon. According to Hickock, as of January 2022, Children's Scholarship Fund–Oregon has provided $3.5 million in partial tuition scholarships for low-income elementary school children to attend private schools.

=== Better government competition ===
In the past, the Cascade Policy Institute sponsored a better government competition, soliciting proposals from the general public about how to improve state or local services. The judges included community and political leaders from a wide range of backgrounds, but winning submissions reflected the institute's free-market philosophy. Winners of Cascade's better government competition included proposals to privatize prisons, liquor operations, and Driver and Motor Vehicle Services; reform Oregon's agricultural land use laws; and streamline adoption of children into foster families. In 1994, 8 out of 10 submissions selected for further development were introduced before the Oregon legislature.

== Policy stances and impact ==
=== Education ===
Cascade Policy Institute has advocated school choice laws since the organization's inception over 30 years ago. Cascade organized conferences supporting charter schools in 1993 and 1994, inviting speakers such as Jeanne Allen, founder of the Center for Education Research, one of the first nationwide groups promoting charter schools, and Ted Kolderie, the policy analyst who helped to develop the first charter school law in Minnesota which passed in 1991. Although charter school bills failed to pass in 1995 and 1997, Oregon finally passed its charter school law in 1999, which included compromises allowing for strong local district control rather than a "pure" free-market approach.

=== Health care ===
A long-time advocate of medical savings accounts, Cascade Policy Institute sponsored numerous conferences on MSAs starting in 1995, and published papers promoting MSAs as a free-market alternative to third-party payer systems.

In 2010, it published a report, The Oregon Health Plan: A "Bold Experiment" that Failed, critiquing the state's inability to meet its objectives. Analysis by Cascade based on U.S. census data showed that the percentage of uninsured Oregonians increased from 12.4 percent in 1990 to 15.3 percent in 1996 after the Oregon Health Plan was first implemented, contradicting a widely cited statistic from the Office of Oregon Health Plan Policy and Research that the percentage had dropped significantly during that period. Cascade also argued that by failing to compensate health care providers adequately, the Oregon Health Plan had caused health maintenance organizations (HMOs) to reduce their services to rural areas.

=== Transportation and land use ===
Cascade has been called one of the leading neoliberal critics of Portland Metro's Transit-Oriented Development (TOD) program, and has testified in front of the Oregon legislature, the TOD Steering Committee, and the Metro task force attempting to raise funds through bonds. Sociologist Erik Solevad Nielsen explains that rather than a wholesale rejection of rail systems or sustainable development, Cascade Policy Institute's stance is that "Metro and TriMet should abandon urban planning, designing and development – and especially avoid high-risk projects." The institute has objected to subsidization of Portland's MAX light rail system and associated development projects, arguing that they have squandered millions of taxpayer dollars, often on projects that have in turn created more housing and transportation problems, and would have been better addressed through privatization. In John Charles's view, the fact that every TOD project undertaken requires subsidies means that the program by definition lacks an economically sustainable business model.

In 2011, the Cascade Policy Institute allied with 1000 Friends of Oregon, a non-profit organization focused on sustainable land use. Acknowledging that they were "strange bedfellows", the two organizations issued a statement that they were nevertheless aligned in opposing certain aspects of a proposed megaproject to build a new bridge and light rail system connecting Oregon and Washington. Instead, they argued, Oregon should focus on seismically retrofitting the existing bridge; funding the construction of a new bridge through tolls; and increasing legislative oversight and management.

== Staff ==
- John A. Charles Jr., president and CEO. He is the author of a chapter on Portland in A Citizens' Guide to Smart Growth, published by The Heritage Foundation and Property and Environment Research Center.
- Kathryn Hickock, executive vice president and director of Cascade's CSF-Oregon program. She is the co-author of 15 Leadership Principles and Ronald Reagan: Use Them to Change Your World with Larry W. Dennis Sr., a Cascade board member.
- Eric Fruits, vice president of research. He is a past contributor to The Economist, The Wall Street Journal, and USA Today.
