= Golden Rule Insurance Company =

American private health insurance company

- Industry: Health insurance
- Founded: November 16, 1940; 85 years ago
- Headquarters: Indianapolis, United States of America
- Key people: Patrick F. Carr (CEO)
- Parent: UnitedHealth Group
- Website: www.uhone.com

Golden Rule Insurance Company, based in Indianapolis, is a provider of short-term personal health insurance plans in the United States. It has been a subsidiary of UnitedHealth Group since November 2003. The company was named after the Golden Rule.

Golden Rule was closely involved in the establishment of health savings accounts (HSA) and the related tax incentives. The company funded millions of dollars to prominent members of the Republican Party such as Newt Gingrich to support HSAs and to fight broader reform.

Membership in Federation of American Consumers and Travelers (FACT) was required to buy certain insurance products.

== History ==
The company was founded on November 16, 1940, by Michael Andrew Rooney in his house in Lawrenceville, Illinois.

In 1976, J. Patrick Rooney became CEO upon the death of his father. In the 1980s, he moved the company from Lawrenceville, Illinois to Indianapolis. He retired from the company in 1996.

In 1981, the company sued the Educational Testing Service (ETS) and the Illinois Department of Insurance, claiming that the ETS examination for Illinois insurance agents discriminated against members of minority groups. The parties reached a settlement.

In August 1991, the company announced that it would pay half of the tuition for 500 low-income children in Indianapolis.

The company was acquired by UnitedHealth Group in 2003.

The current CEO is Patrick Francis Carr, who started in 2012.
