= Pat Rooney (actor born 1848) =

Irish-American vaudevillian and comedian

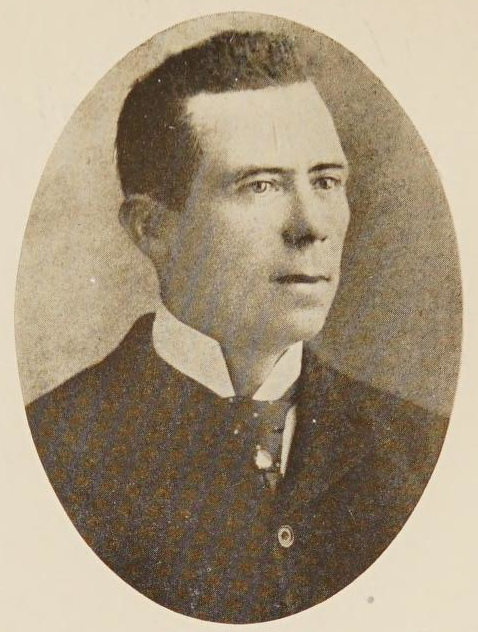
- Born: Patrick Joseph Rooney; 1848; Birmingham, England
- Died: March 28, 1892 (aged 43–44); New York City, U.S.
- Other names: Pat Rooney Sr.
- Occupations: Comedian, actor, entertainer
- Relatives: Pat Rooney Jr. (son)

Patrick Joseph Rooney (1848 – 28 March 1892), often referred to as Pat Rooney Sr. or Pat Rooney the Elder, was an English-born Irish American actor, comedian, songwriter, dancer, and vaudeville performer. He should not be confused with his son Pat Rooney (1880–1962), known variously as Pat Rooney Jr. and Pat Rooney Sr., or his grandson Pat Rooney (1909–1975), also an actor and dancer known as Pat Rooney Jr.

== Life and career ==
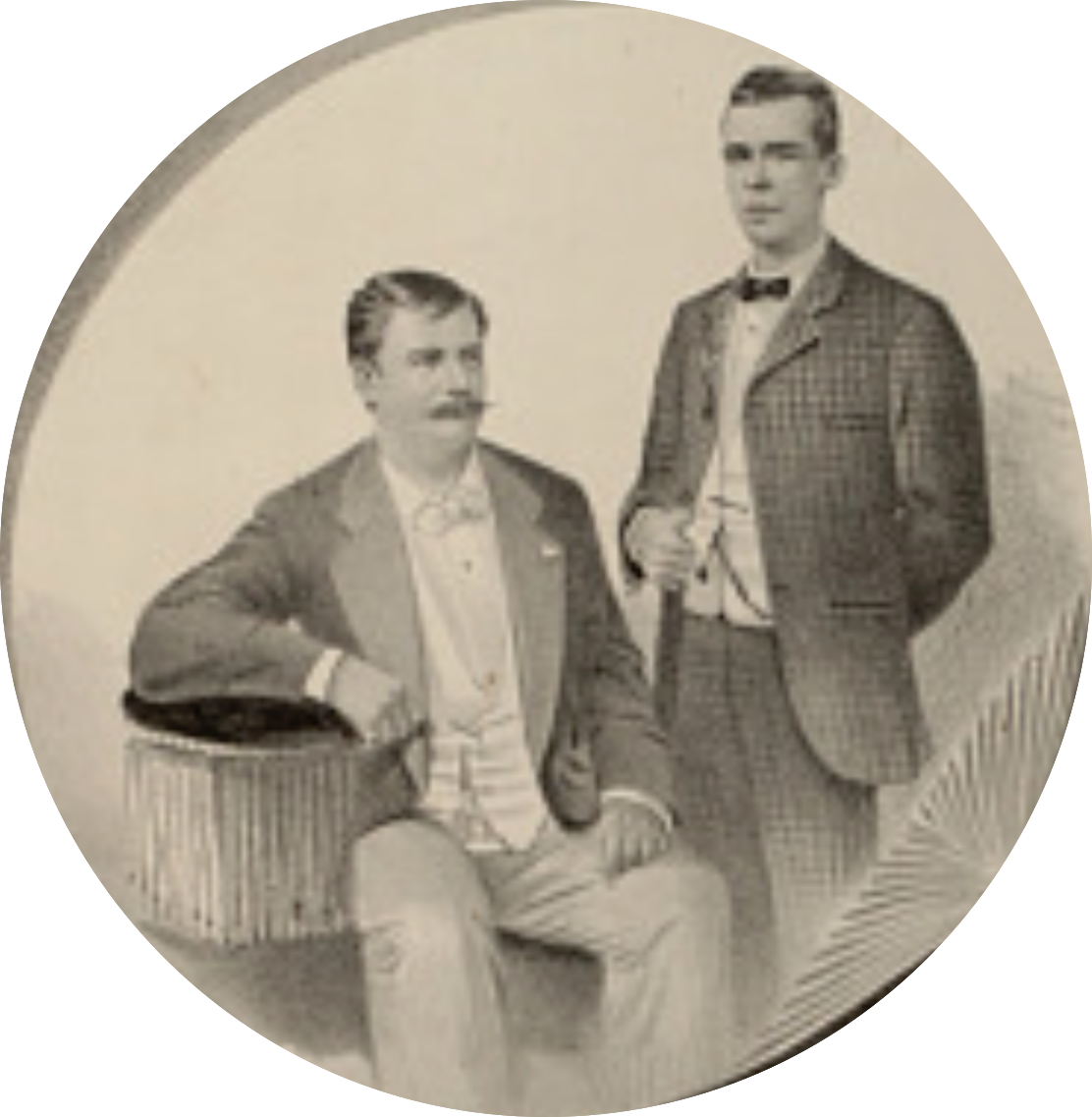
Harry Miner (left) and Pat Rooney (right)

Born into an Irish family in Birmingham, England in 1848, Rooney grew up in Bolton and began his career performing in British music halls. There are conflicting reports over when he immigrated to the United States. Most scholars give stronger credence to an account that he arrived in New York City in 1867 at the age of 19 and made his American debut at the Bowery Theatre three years later in 1870. However, another account states he first arrived in Philadelphia in 1871 and made his American debut that year at Fox's Theatre in that city.

Rooney gained a reputation as a gifted comedian and dancer on the vaudeville stage from the 1870s until his death in 1892. He wrote his own songs, and became famous for his clog dancing which he often did to his original tunes. Some of his more successful songs that gained popularity among the American public of his day included, "Is that Mr. Reilly?", "Pretty Peggy", and "The Day I Played Baseball".

Rooney was married to Josie Granger Rooney with whom he had one son, Pat Rooney Jr. and four daughters: Kate, Mattie, Josie, and Julia. His children performed with him on the vaudeville stage as The Rooneys in a family act, and several of them had careers in entertainment, with his son being the most successful.

Pat Rooney died of pneumonia on 28 March 1892 in New York City.
