= Wes Climer =

American politician (born 1982)

Member-elect of the U.S. House of Representatives from South Carolina's 5th district
- Assuming office January 3, 2027
- Succeeding: Ralph Norman

Member of the South Carolina Senate from the 15th district
- In office November 14, 2016 – November 3, 2026
- Preceded by: Robert W. Hayes Jr.
- Succeeded by: Vacant

Personal details
- Born: David Wesley Climer; September 26, 1982 (age 44) Charlotte, North Carolina, U.S.
- Party: Republican
- Spouse: Martie Behrens (m. 2008)
- Children: 5
- Education: Furman University (BA)
- Website: Campaign website

David Wesley Climer (born September 26, 1982) is an American politician who is the representative-elect for South Carolina's 5th congressional district. From 2016 to 2026, Climer represented the 15th District (York) in the South Carolina Senate. He is a member of the Republican Party. He resigned from the state senate, effective November 3, 2026.

== Political career ==
=== Congressional aide ===
From 2006 to 2011, Climer worked as a Washington, DC-based Congressional aide for Republicans US Rep. Patrick McHenry, US Senator Elizabeth Dole, and Senator Bill Cassidy.

=== South Carolina Senate ===
Climer has represented South Carolina's 15th Senate District since 2016, when he defeated Republican Robert W. Hayes Jr. in the Republican primary. Before that, Hayes had represented the district since 1991.

In the primary race, Climer was endorsed by Governor Nikki Haley, and supported by the Club for Growth and a PAC affiliated with Haley, Great Day SC PAC.

Climer chairs the Senate Agriculture and Natural Resources Committee, and serves on the Senate Family and Veterans' Services, Finance, Labor Commerce and Industry, Legislative Oversight and Transportation Committees.

==== Legislative lawsuit ====
On June 9, 2025, Climer and his attorney, former South Carolina Senator Dick Harpootlian, sued the State of South Carolina over their vote in the 2025 state budget to give themselves pay raises, which they stated is in violation of the State constitution. Climer declined the additional money, as did 2 other members of the Senate and 34 members of the South Carolina House of Representatives.

=== 2026 congressional race ===
On July 31, 2025, Climer announced his bid for the South Carolina Congressional District 5 US House Seat. Incumbent Ralph Norman had announced his intention to run in the 2026 South Carolina gubernatorial election. Climer endorsed Norman in that race.

On August 21, 2025, Norman announced his endorsement of Climer as his successor in Congress.

On February 7, 2026, Climer announced that he would resign in November 2026, concurrent with the passage of a joint resolution by the General Assembly allowing replacement elections for legislators submitting irrevocable resignations by March 1 to take place during the June Primaries, rather than in separate special elections.

== Electoral history ==
Year	Office	Type	Party	Main opponent	Party	Votes for Climer				Result	Swing	Ref.
Year	Office	Type	Party	Main opponent	Party	Total	%	P.	±%	Result	Swing	Ref.
2016	S.C. Senator	Rep. primary	Republican	Robert W. Hayes, Jr. (Note: Incumbent seeking re-election.)	Republican	4,993	51.82%	1st	N/A	Won	N/A	
2016	S.C. Senator	General	Republican	Write-in	N/A	39,584	98.05%	1st	N/A	Won	Hold	
2020	S.C. Senator	General	Republican	Vickie Holt	Democratic	39,121	60.17%	1st	-37.88%	Won	Hold	

== Notes ==
U.S. House of Representatives
Preceded by Ralph Norman	Member of the U.S. House of Representatives from South Carolina's 5th congressional district Taking office 2027	Elect
