= Independence Institute =

American libertarian think tank

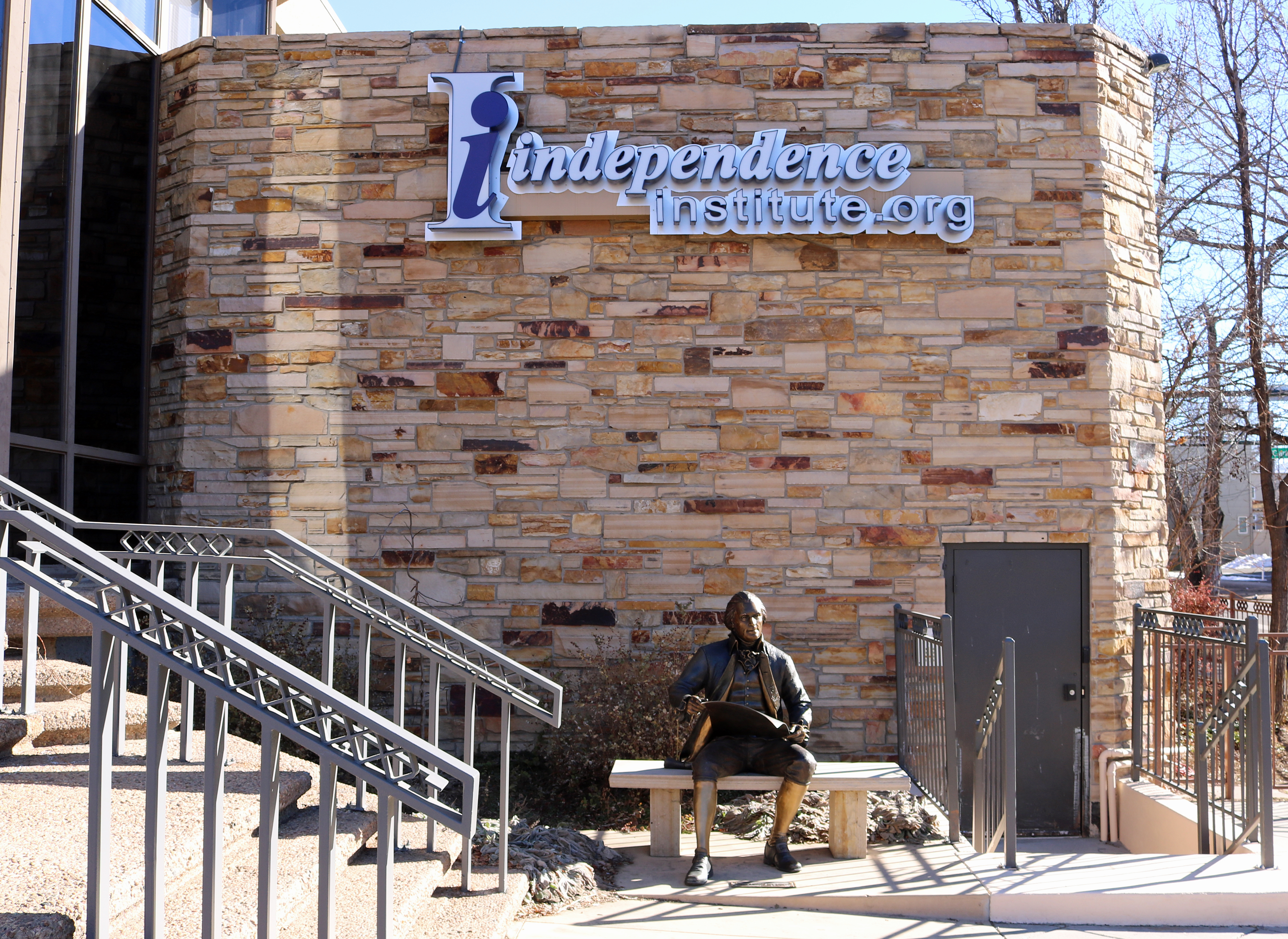
- Entrance to the Independence Institute
- Established: 1985; 41 years ago
- Chair: Catherine Shopneck
- President: Jon Caldara
- Staff: 20(2024)
- Budget: Revenue: $2.3 million Expenses: $2.3 million (FYE December 2024)
- Address: 727 E. 16th Ave. Denver, Colorado 80203
- Location: Denver, Colorado, U.S.
- Coordinates: 39.7419°N 104.9779°W
- Interactive map of Independence Institute
- Website: www.i2i.org

The Independence Institute (II) is a libertarian think tank based in Denver, Colorado. The group's stated mission "is to empower individuals and to educate citizens, legislators and opinion makers about public policies that enhance personal and economic freedom."

== History ==
The Independence Institute was founded in 1985 by John Andrews, a former Republican state legislator from Colorado. Since 1999, Independence Institute has been led by Jon Caldara.

== Policy positions ==
The Independence Institute is a proponent of educational choice and charter schools, as well as the right to bear arms in accordance with the Second Amendment. II supported school board members in Douglas County, Colorado who became the majority there in 2009 and subsequently curtailed the power of the teachers' union, expanded school choice, and attempted to initiate a voucher system. However, a new school board majority elected in 2017 has promised to reverse many of these policies.

Prior to winning election to the United States House of Representatives as a Democrat, Jared Polis wrote a white paper for the institute about privatizing the U.S. Postal Service.

Because of the Institute's pro Second Amendment stance, it supports gun rights, including the right of concealed carry.

The organization supported the Taxpayer Bill of Rights (TABOR), which was passed by Colorado voters in 1992. In 2013, II opposed Amendment 66, an unsuccessful ballot measure that would have increased the state's income tax and reformed public education funding.

II opposed the Affordable Care Act. The Institute supports the use of fossil fuels.

== See also ==
- State Policy Network – a U.S. national network of conservative and libertarian think tank, which the Independence Institute belongs to
- Political activities of the Koch brothers

== Gallery ==
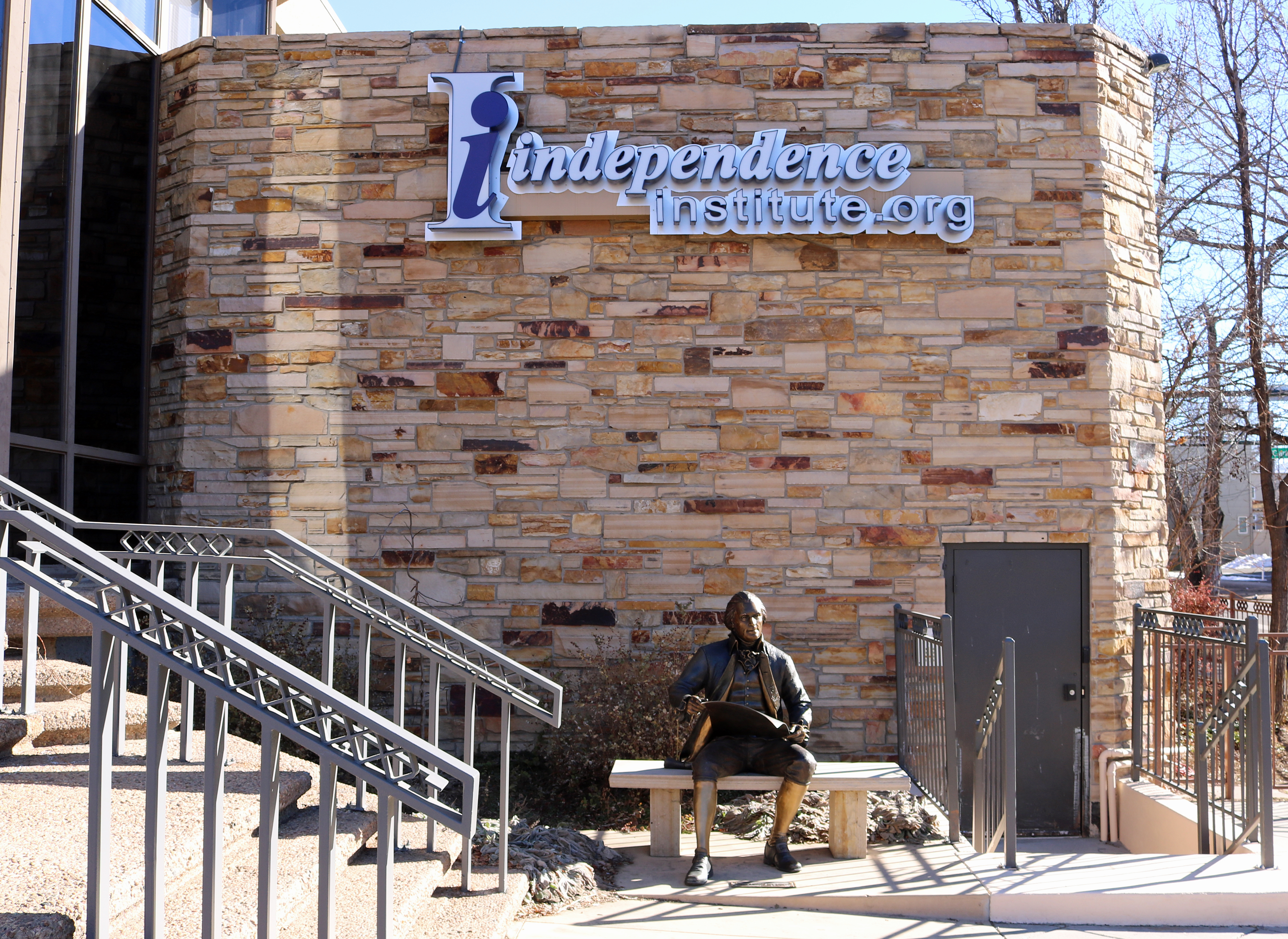
Entrance to the Independence Institute with the statue of Thomas Jefferson

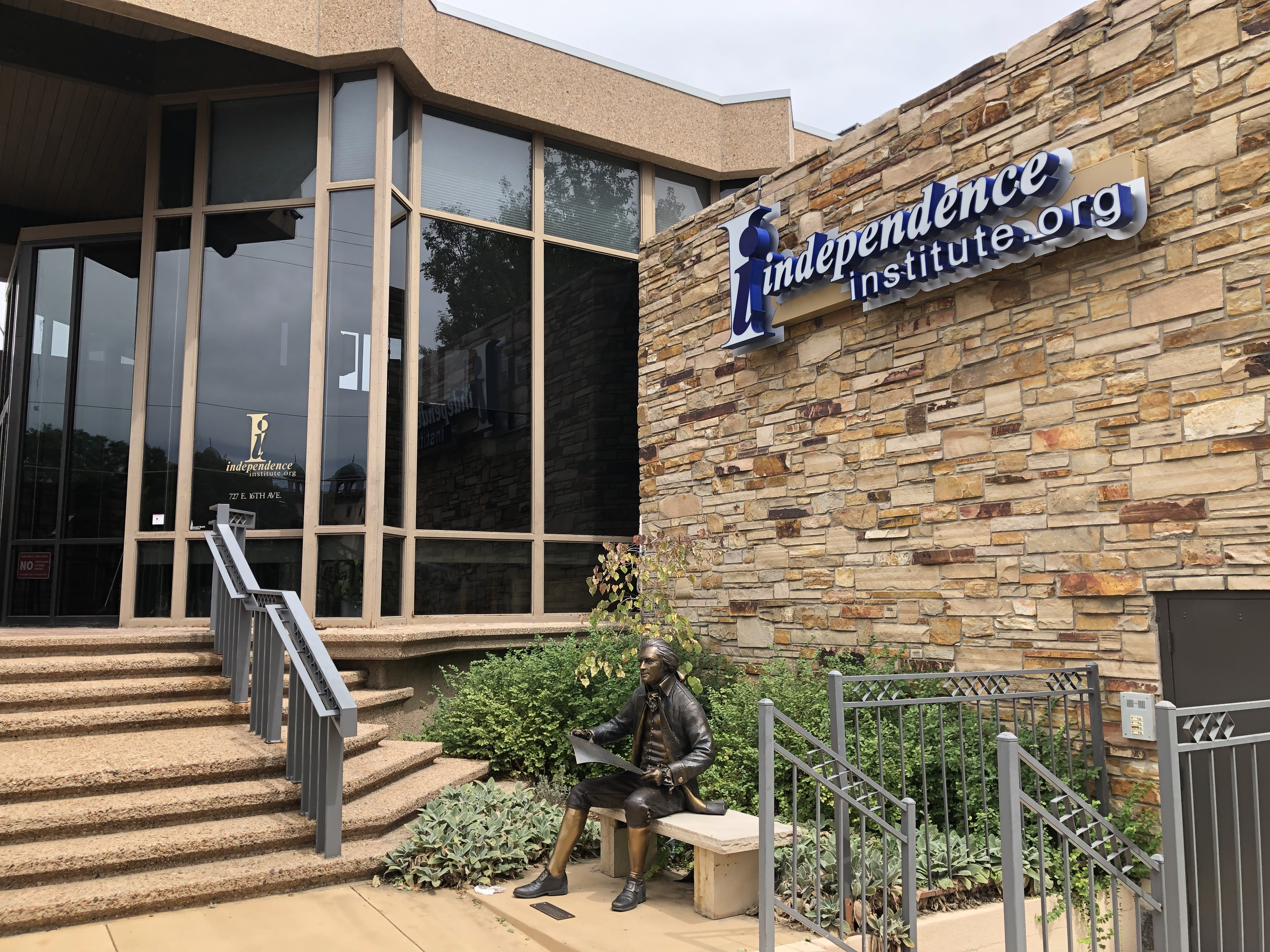
Independence Institute building

Independence Institute logo
