= Pat Rooney (actor born 1880) =

American vaudeville actor (1880–1962)

Pat Rooney Jr.
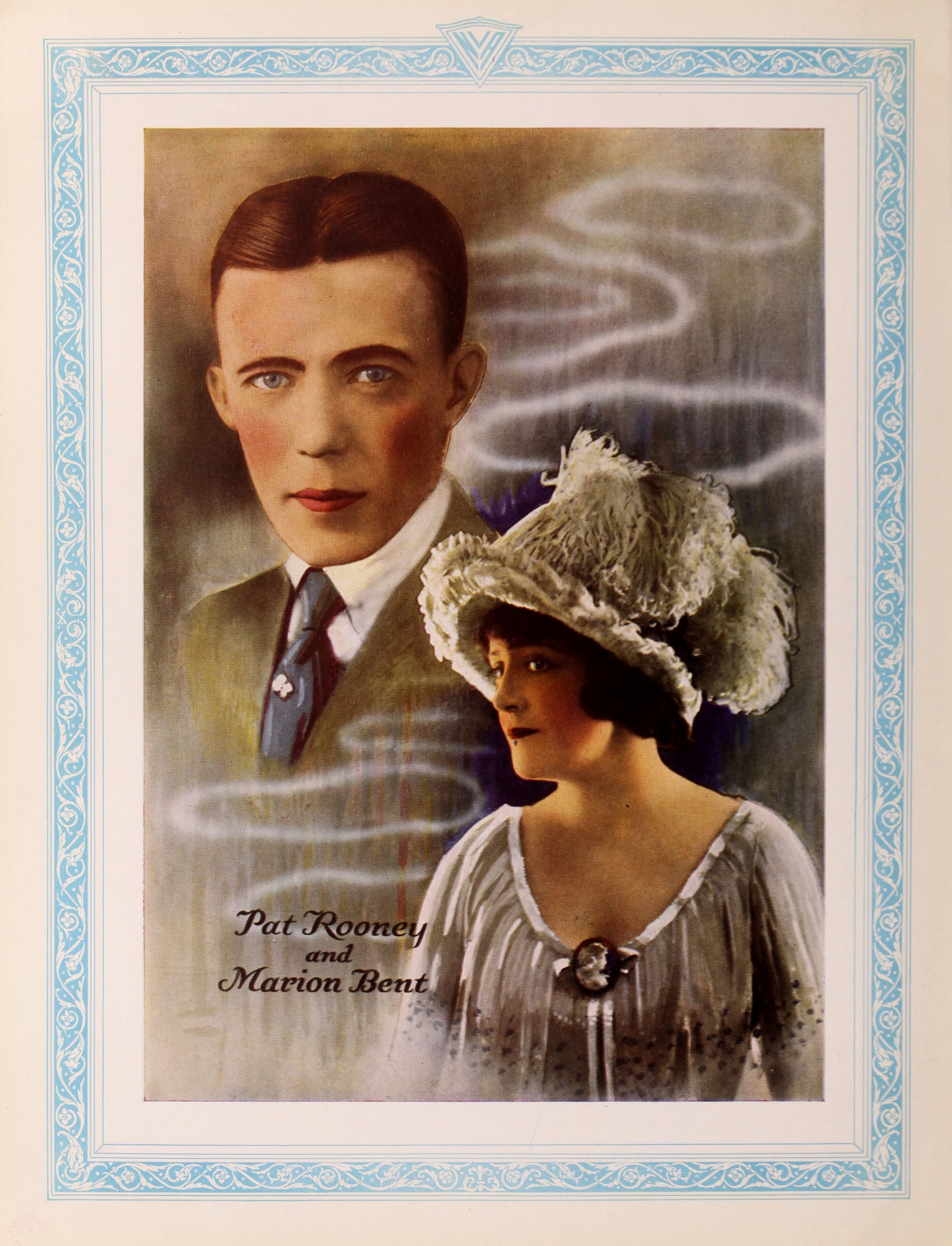
- Pat Rooney and his wife, the actress Marion Bent
- Born: Patrick Joseph Rooney; July 4, 1880; New York City, U.S.
- Died: September 9, 1962 (aged 82); New York City, U.S.
- Occupations: Dancer, actor, entertainer
- Spouse: Marion Bent
- Relatives: Pat Rooney Sr. (father)

Patrick Joseph Rooney (July 4, 1880 – September 9, 1962) was an American actor, dancer, comedian, and vaudeville entertainer. He was known during his early vaudeville career as Pat Rooney, Jr. (to differentiate him from his father, Pat Rooney Sr. (1848–1892)), and later in his career as Pat Rooney, Sr. (to differentiate him from his son, Pat Rooney III, sometimes also known as Pat Rooney Jr. (1909–1979)).

== Life and career ==
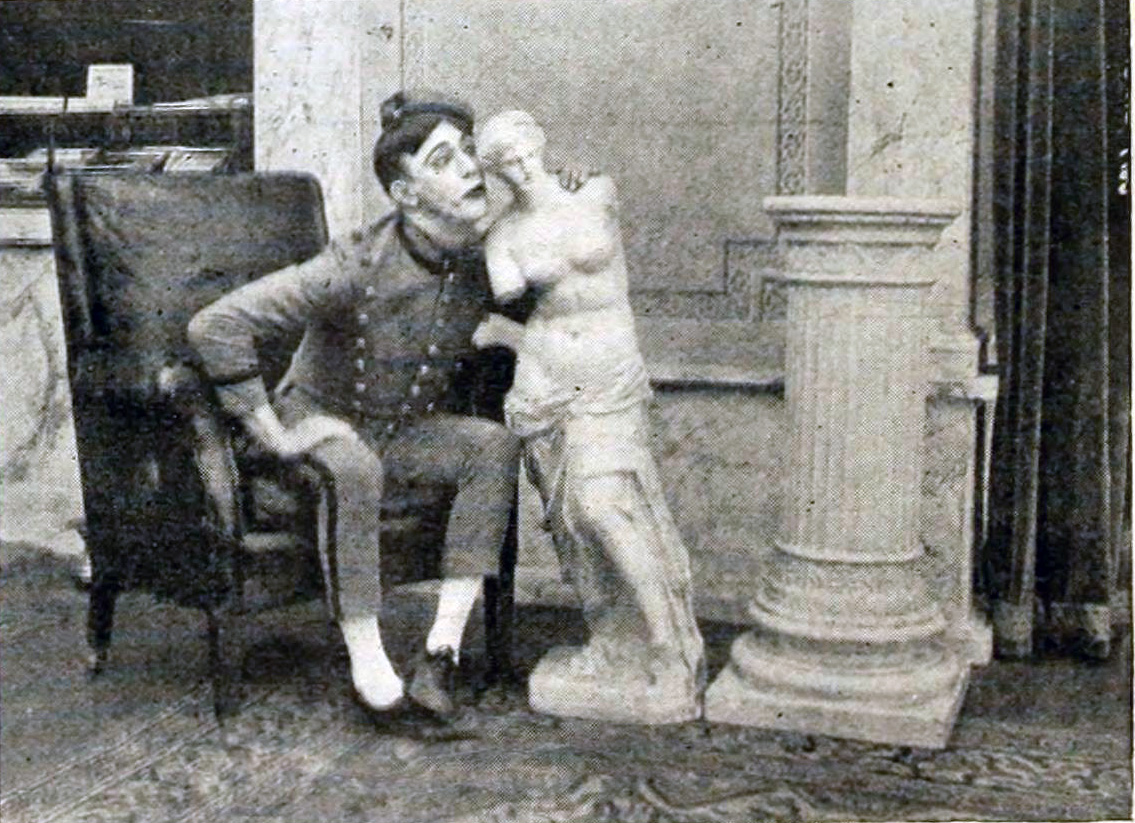
Pat Rooney in The Belle and the Bell Hop (1916)

He was born in New York City, and began dancing at the age of ten as part of an act with his parents, Pat (Sr.) and Josie Rooney. His career on Broadway spanned seven decades, beginning in 1898 with the role of Butts in the musical In Atlantic City. In childhood he was friends with Marion Bent (1879 – 1940); they first performed together in 1903, and married the following year. They became one of the best-loved couples in vaudeville, and performed as a duo, combining singing, dance, and comedy, sometimes augmented by a chorus of dancing girls.

As a dancer, Rooney was famous for inventing the 'waltz clog' step used in both tap dance and clog dancing while working as a dancer at Tony Pastor's 14th Street Theatre during the early years of the 20th century. Between 1912 and 1929 he featured in two dozen silent films, and he was also a songwriter.

Marion Bent retired from dancing in 1932. Pat Rooney Jr. then worked with their son, Pat Rooney III, performing a precision dance routine with father and son working back to back, which was described by Anthony Slide as "quite extraordinary and... never successfully copied". He continued to perform and often appeared on early television programmes. He played the role of Arvide Abernathy in the original production of Guys and Dolls in 1950.

He died in New York in 1962, at the age of 82.
