= South Carolina Policy Council =

Policy advocacy organization

- Motto: "Identifying the barriers to freedom and empowering citizens to remove them."
- Founder: Thomas Roe
- Established: 1986
- CEO: Michael Burris
- Budget: Revenue: $628,000; Expenses: $564,000 (FYE December 2024)
- Subsidiaries: The Nerve
- Location: Columbia, South Carolina
- Website: www.scpolicycouncil.org

The South Carolina Policy Council (SCPC) is a limited-government think tank located in Columbia, South Carolina. The organization's stated mission is "to promote the principles of limited government, free enterprise, and individual liberty and responsibility in the state of South Carolina." SCPC operates The Nerve, a news and investigative reporting website.

== Issues ==
=== Government reform ===
In the spring of 2022, the SCPC hired a new executive director, North Carolina native Dallas Woodhouse. Woodhouse is a former TV news reporter, executive director of the North Carolina Republican Party, and state director of Americans for Prosperity. Before coming to the South Carolina Policy Council, Woodhouse worked for a similar free-market think tank, the John Locke Foundation.

Woodhouse signaled a "return to the roots" of the SCPC, a focus on public policy research and grassroots mobilization. In 2022, the SCPC supported successful efforts to cut income taxes. The SCPC has continued to make increasing transparency in government a high priority. The SCPC has also made expanding school choice a top priority. The organization has provided research and support for the creation of Education Savings Accounts as a method of bringing school choice to households of modest incomes. In 2022, the SCPC began conducting regular statewide voter public opinion surveys.

The SCPC has contended that the main obstacle to free-market reforms in South Carolina isn't a lack of public support, but an unaccountable legislative elite whose goal is to preserve power. In February 2013, the SCPC filed a complaint against Bobby Harrell, South Carolina's Republican Speaker of the House. The complaint alleged that Harrell had committed a variety of abuses of office, including using public office for personal gain. In October 2014, Harrell pleaded guilty to misconduct in office and resigned his position.

=== Roll-call voting ===
SCPC is known for having originated the idea of mandatory roll-call voting in the South Carolina General Assembly (an idea then Rep. Nikki Haley used as the centerpiece of her campaign for governor) and for its detailed explanations of policies and legislation on government restructuring, school choice, government spending, taxes, regulation, and health care.

=== Legislative power ===
SCPC has repeatedly criticized that South Carolina's government puts the lion's share of power in the hands of a few legislative leaders, meaning most of the state's citizens cannot vote for the people who hold power over them. "From education to road funding, from the judicial system to your electric bill, the important decisions are made by state lawmakers who represent only their districts. Most South Carolinians don’t vote for them – or even know their names." The organization has drawn attention to the fact that the state's road funding system is run by a commission whose members are appointed by legislative leaders and who can't be held accountable by taxpayers or voters.

=== Income disclosure ===
Citing South Carolina's loose disclosure laws that allow elected officials to receive private income from entities that benefit from those officials' influence and votes, the Policy Council began advocating mandatory income disclosure in 2008. In 2013 the group launched Project Conflict Watch, which offered lawmakers and constitutional officers the opportunity to voluntarily disclose their income sources. In 2016 the legislature passed a bill, signed into law by Gov. Nikki Haley, that mandated disclosure for some payments, but the group criticized the law on the grounds that it contains several loopholes that will allow officials to get around the law.

=== Health care ===
The Policy Council has opposed the Affordable Care Act and argued that, despite claims made by Gov. Haley and others, South Carolina has in fact expanded Medicaid by sharply increasing the number of people enrolled in the federal program.
