= J. Patrick Rooney =

American businessman and activist (1927–2008)

- Born: John Patrick Rooney; December 13, 1927; Lawrenceville, Illinois
- Died: September 15, 2008 (aged 80); Indianapolis, Indiana
- Occupations: Insurance executive, activist

John Patrick Rooney (December 13, 1927 – September 15, 2008) was the chairman and founder of the Fairness Foundation, whose goal is to help low-income Americans with education and challenging large health care bills. He was the main proponent of what became health savings accounts. He was also the chairman of Golden Rule Insurance Company from 1976 until he retired in 1996.

== Biography ==
Rooney was born in Lawrenceville, Illinois, where he was educated in the public school system.

In June 1976, he became the chairman of Golden Rule Insurance Company, upon the death of his father.

In 1976, Rooney successfully led a fight against discrimination in insurance agent testing with an eight-year lawsuit against the State of Illinois and the Educational Testing Service. The suit charged discrimination against minority applicants. Estimated cost of the litigation and experts was approximately $2 million. The civil rights case was settled with a precedent-setting agreement that requires a method of constructing exams designed to eliminate unnecessary racial disparities.

In 1991, Rooney advocated for school vouchers and founded the Educational Choice Charitable Trust. The Educational Choice Charitable Trust provides tuition assistance for students from lower-income families in Indianapolis whose parents want them to attend a private school.

Rooney briefly sought the 1996 Republican nomination for governor of Indiana.

His efforts led to the passage of the Health Insurance Portability and Accountability Act (HIPAA) in 1996.

He lobbied Congress to win tax-free status for health savings accounts, which Congress granted in 2003.

Rooney received attention in October 2006 United States Congressional elections, after America's PAC, a group to which Rooney donated $900,000, ran controversial ads alleging that Democrats "want to abort black babies".

Also October 2006, Mr. Rooney criticized the prices that hospitals charge, when compared to the price that Medicare pays, claiming that it was racial discrimination.

== Death ==
On Friday, September 12, 2008, Rooney worked a full day. He attended church on Sunday, September 14, 2008, before dying in his sleep that night at home in Indianapolis, Indiana, on September 15, 2008, aged 80.

In his will and testament, he left $100,000 apiece to his seven grandchildren, another $200,000 to his wife, Karen G. Hall, and the rest to the M.A. Rooney Foundation, an educational charity he ran with his daughter, Therese Rooney.
