= E. Pierce Marshall =

American petroleum executive (1939–2006)

- Born: January 12, 1939; San Francisco, California, U.S.
- Died: June 20, 2006 (aged 67); Dallas, Texas, U.S.
- Education: Pomona College
- Occupation: Petroleum industry executive
- Known for: Owner of 16% of Koch Industries directly and via family companies
- Spouse: Elaine Tettemer Marshall
- Children: 2
- Relatives: J. Howard Marshall III (brother)
- Family: J. Howard Marshall (father); Anna Nicole Smith (stepmother)

Everett Pierce Marshall (January 12, 1939 – June 20, 2006) was an American petroleum industry executive. He was the owner of 16% of Koch Industries (both directly and indirectly received as an inheritance from his father, J. Howard Marshall II). He spent the last 12 years of his life as a defendant in lawsuits by his stepmother, Anna Nicole Smith, and his brother, J. Howard Marshall III, who both sought part of his father's fortune after being left out of the will and testament.

Marshall served on the Board of Directors of Koch Industries from 1983 until his death in 2006.

== Early life and education ==
Marshall attended Millersburg Military Institute and Culver Military Academy, then graduated from The Webb Schools in 1956. He received an undergraduate degree from Pomona College in 1961.

== Career ==
Marshall began his career in 1961 at General Motors as an engine test engineer, followed by a brief tour with the United States Navy. After leaving the Navy in 1965, Marshall worked as an analyst for Loeb, Rhoades & Co., an investment bank in New York. In 1967, Marshall moved to Anaheim, California to work for Nickey / Bill Thomas Race Cars. In 1969, Marshall moved to Houston, Texas to work with his father in private investments.

At his brother's wedding in 1974, he and his brother were each given shares representing a 4% stake in Koch Industries by their father, J. Howard Marshall II, who said "these are the crown jewels, take care of them."

In 1980, the four sons of Fred C. Koch fought over control of Koch Industries, founded by their father. J. Howard Marshall III sided with Bill Koch and Frederick R. Koch, while Pierce and his father sided with Charles Koch and David Koch, resulting in J. Howard Marshall buying back the shares he had previously given J. Howard Marshall III. The company purchased the remaining shares of Bill, Frederick and others in 1983.

In 1974, Marshall went to work in the commodities trading division for Koch Industries in Houston. In 1976, he became Manager of Purchasing for Koch Industries in Wichita, Kansas. From 1979 to 1981, he was Vice President of Finance of International Oil and Gas Corporation in Dallas, Texas. During 1982, he managed his own investments. In 1983, he joined Weber, Hall, Sale and Associates, a stock brokerage firm in Dallas. In August 1986, he became the president of Electron Corporation, an iron foundry based in Littleton, Colorado which was founded by his father-in-law, Frank L. Tettemer. He also served as chairman since 1981, when his father-in-law died.

He led Electron through a successful turnaround, saving over 300 jobs in Littleton, Colorado and Blackwell, Oklahoma. When the health of his father, J. Howard Marshall, began to deteriorate in 1993, he ceased his securities brokerage business, delegated his responsibilities at Electron and assumed operational responsibilities at Marshall Petroleum.

His father died in 1995, leaving the family fortune in various entities Pierce owned or controlled and leaving his brother, J. Howard Marshall III, and his father's widow, Anna Nicole Smith, out of the will and testament. Smith and Marshall III sued, and Pierce and his father's estate were defendants in several cases including In re Estate of J. Howard Marshall II, Marshall v. Marshall and Stern v. Marshall, which both reached the Supreme Court of the United States. In the end, the courts ruled that Marshall III and Smith had no rights to the estate. Although Pierce did not like the spotlight and dealing with lawyers, he refused to settle the cases because he believed he was fighting a crusade to honor the final wishes of his father.

== Death ==
Marshall died on June 20, 2006, at the age of 67 as a result of septic shock brought on by a combination of staphylococcus and streptococcus infections that were resistant to drugs. His shares in Koch Industries then passed to trusts for the benefit of his wife, Elaine Tettemer Marshall, and his children, Preston Marshall and E. Pierce Marshall Jr.

== Personal life ==
Marshall married Elaine Tettemer Marshall in 1965 and they had two sons: Preston Marshall and E. Pierce Marshall Jr.

Marshall always said that his shares in Koch Industries were worth less than amounts indicated in published reports since the company had no plans to become a public company and they were therefore illiquid.

Marshall was a motorsports enthusiast and heavily involved and connected to the sports car and boat racing scenes in Southern California beginning in 1956. At various times throughout his life he competed in NHRA and SCCA events as well as the last running of the Cannonball Baker Sea-to-Shining-Sea Memorial Trophy Dash, better known as the Cannonball Run, in April 1979. Teamed with Sports Car Club of America racers Dave Faust and Kirby Goodman, Marshall drove a Chevrolet Malibu with the 9C1 Police Patrol Package and a 350-cubic-inch LT-1 Z-28 Chevrolet Camaro engine, finishing 13th in a field of 47 competitors, completing the run from Darien, Connecticut, to Redondo Beach, California, in 36 hours, 51 minutes. Marshall wrote, "Over two decades later, the laughs and the memories are still fresh. I was fortunate to be involved".
