= Elaine Tettemer Marshall =

American billionaire heiress

- Born: Elaine Tettemer; July 22, 1942 (age 83)
- Known for: Beneficial ownership of 16% of Koch Industries
- Spouse: E. Pierce Marshall (m. 1965; died 2006)
- Children: 2
- Relatives: J. Howard Marshall (father in-law); J. Howard Marshall III (brother in-law)

Elaine Tettemer Marshall (born July 22, 1942) is an American billionaire heiress. Trusts for the benefit of Marshall and her two sons own the 16% beneficial interest in Koch Industries that were formerly owned by her husband, E. Pierce Marshall, to whom she was married from 1965 until his death in 2006. These shares were previously owned by her father in-law, J. Howard Marshall, who was married to actress Anna Nicole Smith in the last year of his life.

Elaine has been a member of the board of directors of Koch Industries since the 2006 death of her husband. As of October 2025, Marshall and her family are worth US$30.9 billion and are ranked 67th in the Forbes ranking of world's billionaires.

== Legal issues ==
After Anna Nicole Smith sued to lay a claim to the estate of J. Howard Marshall, Elaine's father in-law, Elaine was a party in several legal cases including Stern v. Marshall and Marshall v. Marshall. As a trustee and a beneficiary of various family trusts, she was also a defendant in a case, decided in 2014, regarding gift tax due from an indirect gift of shares of Koch Industries by her father in-law to these trusts in 1995.

== See also ==
- List of female billionaires
