= J. H. Marshall =

J. H. Marshall may refer to:

- John Hubert Marshall (1876–1958), English archaeologist
- J. H. Marshall-Cornwall (1887–1985), British Army soldier and military historian
- J. Howard Marshall (1905–1995), American oil business executive
- J. Howard Marshall III (born 1936)
