= J. Howard Marshall III =

American owner of MDH Industries

James Howard Marshall III
- Born: February 6, 1936 (age 90); San Francisco, California, U.S.
- Occupation: Electronics company executive
- Known for: Former owner of 4% of Koch Industries
- Spouse: Ilene O. Marshall
- Family: J. Howard Marshall II (father); E. Pierce Marshall (brother); Elaine Tettemer Marshall (sister in-law); Preston Marshall (nephew); Anna Nicole Smith (stepmother)

James Howard Marshall III (born February 6, 1936) is president and owner of MDH Industries, an electronics company based in Monrovia, California. He is the eldest son of J. Howard Marshall II, who owned 16% of Koch Industries.

== Conflict with his father ==
At his wedding in 1974, Marshall III and his brother, E. Pierce Marshall, were each given shares representing a 4% stake in Koch Industries by their father, J. Howard Marshall II, who said "these are the crown jewels, take care of them."

In 1980, the four sons of Fred C. Koch fought over control of Koch Industries, founded by their father. Marshall III sided with Bill Koch and Frederick R. Koch, while J. Howard Marshall II and E. Pierce Marshall sided with Charles Koch and David Koch. Charles and David got control of the company in 1983.

Marshall II then demanded that Marshall III return the 4% interest in Koch Industries that was gifted to him. Marshall III forced his father to pay $8 million for the shares. Even though the shares are worth billions today, at the time, his father thought the price was exorbitant and cut Marshall III out of his will and testament, saying the $8 million was "all he'd get".

After his father died in 1995, Marshall III sued his father's estate, as well as his brother, sister in-law, and nephew for an inheritance. He also sued Koch Industries and Charles and David Koch.

In March 2001, a Texas probate jury found that J. Howard's will and trust were valid and had not been executed under fraud or malice, Pierce had not committed any wrongdoing, and that Marshall III and his father's widow, Anna Nicole Smith, were not entitled to any part of his estate. Further, the jury found Marshall III had committed fraud with actual malice for filing the lawsuit and forced Marshall III to pay his brother $35 million plus legal fees at a time when Marshall III claimed his net worth was $26 million. Even though the award was reduced to $11 million plus legal fees, Marshall III filed bankruptcy on July 11, 2002.

== In popular culture ==
J. Howard Marshall III played himself in The Life and Death of Anna Nicole, a TV movie documentary released in 2007, and was featured in a 2001 episode of E! True Hollywood Story.
