= Anna Nicole Smith =

American model and television personality (1967–2007)

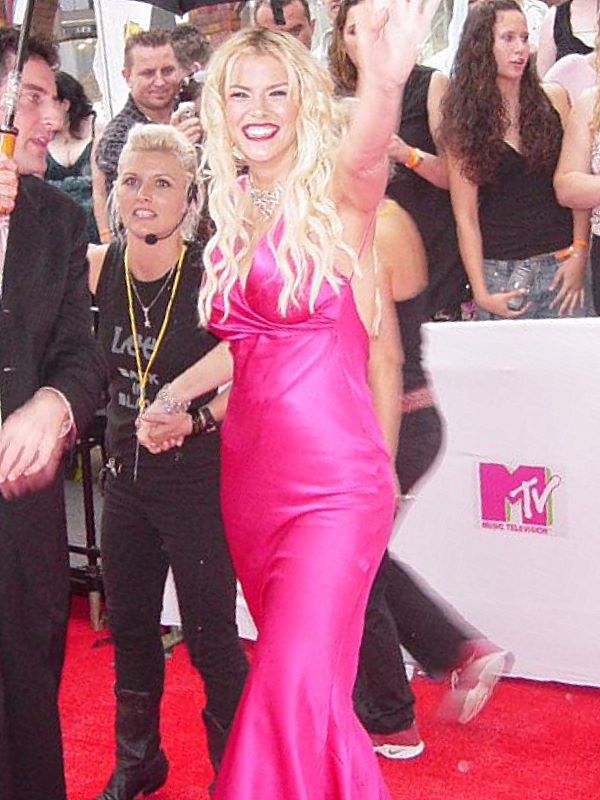
- Smith in 2005
- Born: Vickie Lynn Hogan; November 28, 1967; Houston, Texas, U.S.
- Died: February 8, 2007 (aged 39); Hollywood, Florida, U.S.
- Cause of death: Combined drug intoxication
- Other names: Vickie Lynn Smith; Vickie Lynn Marshall; Nikki Hart
- Occupations: Model; actress; TV personality
- Years active: 1992–2007
- Spouses: Billy Smith (m. 1985; div. 1993); J. Howard Marshall (m. 1994; died 1995)
- Children: 2

Playboy centerfold appearance
- May 1992
- Preceded by: Cady Cantrell
- Succeeded by: Angela Melini

Playboy Playmate of the Year
- 1993
- Preceded by: Corinna Harney
- Succeeded by: Jenny McCarthy

Vickie Lynn Marshall (née Hogan; November 28, 1967 – February 8, 2007), known professionally as Anna Nicole Smith, was an American model, actress, and television personality. Smith began her modeling career as a Playboy magazine centerfold in May 1992 and won the title of 1993 Playmate of the Year. She later modeled for clothing companies, including Guess, H&M, and Heatherette.

In 1994, Smith married 89-year-old billionaire J. Howard Marshall. Following Marshall's death in 1995, she began a lengthy legal battle over his estate that reached the Supreme Court of the United States. In the early 2000s, Smith served as a spokeswoman for the dietary supplement brand TrimSpa and appeared in films. She also starred in her own reality program on E!, The Anna Nicole Show (2002–2004).

Smith died from combined drug intoxication in Hollywood, Florida, in 2007.

== Early life ==
Smith was born Vickie Lynn Hogan on November 28, 1967, in Houston, Texas, the only daughter of Virgie Tabers Arthur (1951–2018) and Donald Eugene Hogan (1947–2009). She was primarily raised by her mother and her family in Mexia, Texas. She attended Mexia High School before dropping out in 1984.

== Career ==
=== Modeling and endorsements ===
While working in a strip club, Smith began her modeling career in Playboy. Appearing under the pseudonym Vickie Smith, she was the Playboy centerfold in May 1992. She was named Playmate of the Year in 1993.

That same year, Smith replaced supermodel Claudia Schiffer as the face of Guess Jeans. The advertising campaign featured a series of sultry black-and-white photographs. During the Guess campaign, she adopted the stage name "Anna Nicole". Guess photographers noticed that she bore a striking resemblance to Jayne Mansfield and showcased her in several Mansfield-inspired photo sessions. She also modeled for the Swedish clothing company H&M, which led to her picture being displayed on large billboards in Sweden and Norway. Smith appeared on the cover of Marie Claire, shot by Peter Lindbergh, and in GQ magazine. In 2004, she walked the runway for Heatherette in their Fall 2004 collection. In November 2004, she appeared in her anti-fur ad campaign for PETA entitled "Gentlemen Prefer Fur-Free Blondes."

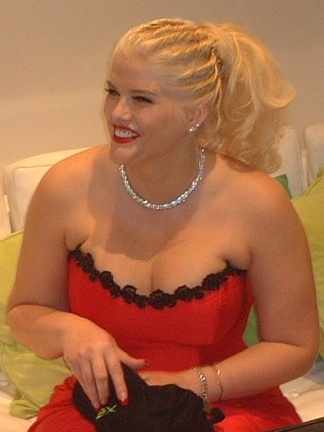
Smith in 2003

In October 2003, Smith became the spokeswoman for TrimSpa, a dietary supplement she said helped her lose a reported 69 pounds (31 kg). On February 6, 2007, two days before her death, TrimSpa and Smith were sued in a class-action lawsuit alleging their marketing of a weight loss pill was false or misleading. TrimSpa filed for bankruptcy after her death and was liquidated. In March 2005, at the first MTV Australia Video Music Awards in Sydney's Luna Park, Smith spoofed Janet Jackson's wardrobe malfunction by pulling down her dress to reveal both breasts, each covered with the MTV logo.

=== Television and films ===
Smith made her film debut in 1994 in the screwball comedy The Hudsucker Proxy, in which she played the minor role of Za-Za. She was offered roles in two other major 1994 films: The Mask and Naked Gun 33 1/3: The Final Insult. She turned down The Mask and took the role of Tanya Peters in Naked Gun 33 1/3: The Final Insult. In 1995, she played the lead role of Vickie Lynn, an ex-CIA agent using the pseudonym Colette Dubois, in the thriller To the Limit. The following year, she portrayed Carrie Wink in the direct-to-video film Skyscraper.

In 2002, Smith became the subject of her own reality sitcom, The Anna Nicole Show. The show followed Smith, her personal assistant Kimmie, her personal attorney Howard K. Stern, and her son Daniel Wayne Smith. The program ran from August 2002 to October 2004 on the E! Network.

After a nine-year hiatus from film, Smith played a cameo role in the 2005 crime comedy Be Cool. Her final film role was the lead of Lucy in the low-budget science fiction comedy film Illegal Aliens, which she filmed alongside her son, Daniel. The film was released posthumously in May 2007.

== Personal life ==
While working at Jim's Krispy Fried Chicken in Mexia, Smith met Billy Wayne Smith, a cook at the restaurant. The couple married on April 4, 1985, when he was 16 and she was 17. She gave birth to their son, Daniel Wayne Smith, on January 22, 1986. The couple separated the following year and divorced in 1993.

While performing at a Houston strip club in October 1991, Smith met 86-year-old petroleum tycoon J. Howard Marshall. On June 27, 1994, Smith and Marshall were married in Houston, prompting speculation that she married him for his money. Marshall died on August 4, 1995, in Houston, at age 90.

=== Court cases and bankruptcy ===
In October 1994, Smith filed a $5 million lawsuit against New York magazine, claiming that she did not authorize the use of her photo on the cover of its issue titled "White Trash Nation" and that the article damaged her reputation. The lawsuit was settled.

Smith was not named in Marshall's will. She claimed that in return for marriage, Marshall promised her half of his estate. The estate primarily consisted of a 16% interest in Koch, Inc., worth $1.6 billion. Smith's stepson, E. Pierce Marshall, challenged her claim. She temporarily joined forces with J. Howard's other son, J. Howard Marshall III, who had been disowned after attempting to take control of Koch. Howard III claimed that his father had promised him a portion of the estate; like Smith, he was also left out of his father's will.

In 1996, Smith filed for bankruptcy in California as a result of an $850,000 default judgment against her for the sexual harassment of a nanny who cared for her son. Because any money she could potentially receive from the Marshall estate was considered part of her potential assets, the bankruptcy court became involved in the matter.

In September 2000, a Los Angeles bankruptcy judge awarded Smith $449,754,134.00, the amount that Marshall's interest in Koch appreciated during their marriage. In July 2001, Houston judge Mike Wood affirmed the jury's findings in the probate case by ruling that Smith was entitled to nothing. He ordered her to pay over $1 million to cover the legal costs and expenses of E. Pierce Marshall. The conflict between the Texas probate court and California bankruptcy court judgments forced the matter into federal court.

In March 2002, a federal judge vacated the California bankruptcy court's ruling and issued a new ruling that reduced the award to $88 million. On December 30, 2004, a three-judge panel of the United States Court of Appeals for the Ninth Circuit reversed that decision on the grounds that the federal courts lacked jurisdiction to overrule the probate court's decision. In September 2005, the U.S. Supreme Court agreed to hear the appeal of the Ninth Circuit decision. The George W. Bush administration directed Paul Clement, the United States Solicitor General, to intercede on Smith's behalf in the interest of expanding federal court jurisdiction over state probate disputes. On May 1, 2006, the Supreme Court unanimously decided in Smith's favor. Justice Ruth Bader Ginsburg wrote the opinion. The decision did not give Smith a portion of Marshall's estate, but affirmed her right to pursue a share of it in federal court.

On June 20, 2006, E. Pierce Marshall died at age 67 from an infection. His widow and estate executor, Elaine Tettemer Marshall, pursued the case on behalf of his estate. After Smith's death in 2007, the case continued on behalf of Smith's infant daughter, Dannielynn Birkhead. In March 2010, an appeals court upheld the verdict barring Smith from the estate. Lawyers for Smith's estate appealed the decision to the entire Ninth Circuit. On May 6, 2010, the appeal was denied.

In June 2011, in Stern v. Marshall, the Supreme Court issued a ruling against Smith's estate, stating that the California bankruptcy court decision that gave her estate $475 million was made without subject-matter jurisdiction. The court agreed with the ruling of the Ninth Circuit that a bankruptcy court could not make a decision on an issue outside bankruptcy law. In August 2014, U.S. District Court judge David O. Carter rejected efforts to obtain about $44 million from the J. Howard Marshall estate.

=== Birth of daughter ===
A psychiatrist who met with Smith in April 2006 stated that she believed Smith had borderline personality disorder and was addicted to prescription medications.

On June 1, 2006, Smith announced her pregnancy in a video clip on her official website. She gave birth to a daughter, Dannielynn, on September 7, 2006, in New Providence, Commonwealth of the Bahamas. In an interview on CNN's Larry King Live after the death of Smith's son, attorney Howard K. Stern said that he and Smith had been in a relationship for "a very long time" and said he was Dannielynn's father. Entertainment photographer Larry Birkhead claimed that he was Dannielynn's father and filed a lawsuit to establish paternity. The Bahamian birth certificate listed Stern as the father.

A judge in the United States ordered DNA paternity tests to determine Dannielynn's biological father. After Smith's death, Birkhead's attorney asked for an emergency DNA sample to be taken from Smith's body. The request was denied by a judge who ordered that her body be preserved until February 20.

On February 9, 2007, Zsa Zsa Gabor's husband, Frédéric Prinz von Anhalt, stated that he had had a decade-long affair with Smith and could potentially be the father of her daughter. Smith's former bodyguard and chef, Alexander Denk, also claimed that he had an affair with Smith and that he, too, was potentially the father.

After Smith's death, TMZ reported that she had been given a prescription for methadone under a false name while she was in her eighth month of pregnancy. The Medical Board of California launched a review. The prescribing doctor, Sandeep Kapoor, said the treatment he had administered was "sound and appropriate".

In April 2007, a Bahamian judge ruled that DNA tests had established Birkhead as Dannielynn's biological father. Birkhead applied for an amended birth certificate listing him as the father, paving the way for him to obtain a passport for the baby to leave for the United States. Stern did not contest the DNA results or the ruling, and Birkhead returned to the United States with the baby. Smith's mother, Virgie Arthur, appealed the ruling, but her appeal was denied and she was ordered to pay costs.

=== Death of son ===
On September 10, 2006, Smith's twenty-year-old son Daniel Wayne Smith died in his mother's hospital room while visiting her and his half-sister Dannielynn, who was born three days earlier. An autopsy found that Daniel had died from a combination of drugs, including methadone and antidepressants. A Bahamian jury determined that he had died from an accidental drug overdose and recommended no criminal charges. A death certificate was issued on September 21. Daniel was buried at Lake View Cemetery in New Providence on October 19.

According to Stern, Smith was devastated by her son's death. "Anna and Daniel were inseparable. Daniel was without question the most important person in Anna's life," Stern said during his testimony at the trial regarding the right to control disposition of Smith's remains. "At Daniel's funeral, she had them open the coffin and tried to climb inside. She said that 'if Daniel has to be buried, I want to be buried with him.' She was ready to go down with him." Stern said, "Anna saw herself as both mother and father to Daniel. From the time I met her, everything was for Daniel. I would say that physically, she died last week, but in a lot of ways, emotionally she died when Daniel died."

=== Commitment ceremony with Stern ===
On September 28, 2006, Smith and Stern exchanged vows and rings in an informal commitment ceremony in the Bahamas. Although they pledged their love and made a commitment to be there for each other before a Baptist minister, no marriage certificate was issued and the ceremony did not create a legal marriage. Regarding the timing of the ceremony, Smith's attorney in Nassau said, "They needed a little adrenaline boost because things have been so hectic and devastating in their life recently."

=== Residency in the Bahamas ===
Smith and Stern were reportedly staying in the Bahamas to avoid paternity testing of her daughter in the United States. In late 2006, Smith was granted permanent resident status in the Bahamas by Immigration Minister Shane Gibson. A local newspaper published photographs showing Smith lying clothed in bed in an embrace with Gibson. Gibson resigned after the wave of controversy over his relationship with Smith.

Smith's permanent residency status was based on her claim that she owned a $900,000 mansion, which she said was given to her by a former boyfriend, real estate developer Gaither Ben Thompson of South Carolina. Thompson said he loaned Smith the finances to purchase the property, which she failed to repay, and that he was attempting to regain control of it. Thompson sued to evict Smith from the property in the Bahamas Court and received a default judgment against her. It was claimed that methadone was found in Smith's bedroom refrigerator while the mansion was being reclaimed. A photograph provided to TMZ of Smith's refrigerator showed a large bottle labelled methadone, vials of injectable vitamin B12 (cyanocobalamin), and numerous bottles of SlimFast.

== Death ==
Smith was found unresponsive in her room at the Seminole Hard Rock Hotel & Casino in Hollywood, Florida, on February 8, 2007. Smith's bodyguard and his wife, a registered nurse, performed cardiopulmonary resuscitation (CPR). Smith was taken to Hollywood's Memorial Regional Hospital, where she was pronounced dead at age 39.

An investigation was led by Broward County Medical Examiner and forensic pathologist Joshua Perper, in conjunction with Seminole police and several independent forensic pathologists and toxicologists. Perper announced that Smith died of "combined drug intoxication", with the sleeping medication chloral hydrate as the "major component". No illegal drugs were found in her system. According to the official report, her death was not due to homicide, suicide, or natural causes.

Smith's death was ultimately ruled an accidental drug overdose of the sedative chloral hydrate, which became increasingly toxic when combined with other prescription drugs in her system, specifically four benzodiazepines. She had also taken diphenhydramine and topiramate. Despite rumors of methadone use involved in the death of Smith's son, Perper found methadone only in her bile, indicating it was likely ingested 2–3 days before her death, and was not a contributing factor. The autopsy report states that abscesses on her buttocks, presumably from prior injections of vitamin B12 in the form of cyanocobalamin, as well as human growth hormone, and viral enteritis were contributory causes of death. Tests for influenza A and B were negative. Eight of the eleven drugs in Smith's system, including the chloral hydrate, were prescribed to Stern, not Smith. Two prescriptions were written for "Alex Katz" and one was written for Smith's friend and psychiatrist Dr. Khristine Eroshevich. Perper acknowledged that all of the prescriptions were written by Dr. Eroshevich. Smith's funeral took place on March 2, 2007, in the Bahamas.

=== Last will and testament ===
Smith's will was prepared by attorney Eric Lund in 2001 in Los Angeles, California. She named her son Daniel as the sole beneficiary of her estate, specifically excluded other children, and named Stern executor. It listed personal property valued at $10,000 and real estate valued at $1.8 million, with a $1.1 million mortgage, at the time of her death. A petition to probate Smith's will was filed in Los Angeles County Superior Court, listing Birkhead as a party with interest in the estate.

== Legacy ==
Anna Nicole, an opera by Mark-Anthony Turnage about Smith, premiered on February 17, 2011, at the Royal Opera House, to mixed reviews. Smith was the subject of the 2023 Netflix documentary Anna Nicole Smith: You Don't Know Me. She was also the subject of the biographical films The Anna Nicole Smith Story (2007), and The Anna Nicole Story (2013), and Hurricanna (2025).

In 2017, Smith's primary care physician Sandeep Kapoor published a memoir titled Trust Me, I'm a Doctor: My Life Before, During and After Anna Nicole Smith.

== Depictions ==
Willa Ford portrays Smith in the 2007 independent film The Anna Nicole Smith Story. Former friend and interior designer Bobby Trendy appears in the film.

Julia Walters, Alexa Blair, and Agnes Bruckner portray Smith in the 2013 made-for-television film The Anna Nicole Story, depicting her life from childhood until her death. To capture Smith's physique, special effects artists Greg Cannom, Todd McIntosh, and David De Leon created prosthetic gel-filled silicone DD breasts for Bruckner, who is naturally a B cup.

Sylvia Hoeks portrays Smith in the 2025 Francesca Gregorini-directed film Hurricanna, depicting the final days of Smith's life.

Abbie Cornish portrays Smith in the film Trust Me, I'm a Doctor, based on the 2017 book of the same name written by Smith's former primary physician, Dr. Sandeep Kapoor, and scheduled for release on October 16, 2026. Larry Birkhead objected to the upcoming film, which he was not involved with, and filed a complaint with the California Medical Board over Kapoor's involvement.

== Filmography ==
=== Film ===
Year	Title	Role	Notes
1994	The Hudsucker Proxy	Za-Za	Theatrical film debut
1994	Naked Gun 33 1/3: The Final Insult	Tanya Peters	Winner – Golden Raspberry Award for Worst New Star
1995	To the Limit	Colette Dubois	First starring role
1996	Skyscraper	Carrie Wink	Second leading role
1998	Anna Nicole Smith: Exposed	Herself	Documentary
2003	Wasabi Tuna	Herself	Independent action comedy film
2005	Be Cool	Herself	Final feature film
2007	Illegal Aliens	Lucy	Final film role, released posthumously

=== Television ===
Year	Title	Role	Notes
1995	The Naked Truth	Herself	Episode: "Wilde Again"
1998	Sin City Spectacular	Herself	Episode: "1.13
1999	Veronica's Closet	Donna	Episode: "Veronica's Wedding Bell Blues"
1999	Ally McBeal	Myra Jacobs	Episode: "Pyramids on the Nile"
2000	N.Y.U.K.	Dr. Anita Hugg	Anthology series
2002–2004	The Anna Nicole Show	Herself	Reality sitcom; Nominee – Choice Reality/Variety TV Star: Female
2005	All Of Us	Herself	Episode: "Kiss, Kiss, Pass"
2005	Comedy Central Roast of Pamela Anderson	Herself	Celebrity roast special

=== Music videos ===
Year	Title	Artist(s)	Ref.
1993	"Will You Love Me Tomorrow"	Bryan Ferry	
1997	"My Heart Belongs to Daddy"	Anna Nicole Smith	
1997	"You Win, I Lose"	Supertramp	
1998	"Jumper"	Third Eye Blind	
2004	"The New Workout Plan"	Kanye West	

Suzi Simpson	Tanya Beyer	Tylyn John	Cady Cantrell	Anna Nicole Smith	Angela Melini
Amanda Hope	Ashley Allen	Morena Corwin	Tiffany Sloan	Stephanie Adams	Barbara Moore
