= Sons of Wichita =

- Author: Daniel Schulman
- Language: English
- Subject: Political convictions
- Publisher: Grand Central Publishing
- Publication date: May 2014
- Publication place: United States
- Media type: Print (Hardcover)
- Pages: 432

Sons of Wichita: How the Koch Brothers Became America's Most Powerful and Private Dynasty (2014) is a non-fiction book written by the American journalist Daniel Schulman about the wealthy Koch family and their political activities.

== Overview ==
The book is an overview of the Koch family, particularly the relationship between the brothers Frederick R. Koch, Charles Koch, David Koch and Bill Koch. It focuses on the later rivalry between the Koch brothers, their personal lives, and political activities.

== Reception ==
The book was well received by critics, particularly for its nonpartisan approach to the political activities of the Koch brothers, as well as Schulman's use of research and interviews with individuals close to the Kochs' to source the information within the book. Matea Gold of The Washington Post described the book as "fair-minded and inquisitive" but noted that it "sometimes veers into gratuitous details." Nicholas Leman of The New York Times wrote that "Schulman has ably assembled everything known about the Kochs into a single, straightforward, understandable account, marred by occasional lapses into cheesy wording".

== See also ==
- Political activities of the Koch brothers
- Koch family
- Citizen Koch
- Charles Koch
- David Koch
