= Harry Koch (businessman) =

American businessman (1867–1942)

- Born: Hotze Koch; 22 October 1867; Workum, Friesland, Netherlands
- Died: 21 June 1942 (aged 74); Quanah, Texas, U.S.
- Occupations: Printer, businessman
- Known for: Founder of Quanah Tribune-Chief newspaper; Founder of Quanah, Acme and Pacific Railway
- Spouse: Margaret Mixson
- Children: 2, including Fred

Hotze "Harry" Koch (/kɒx/ KOKH; 22 October 1867 – 21 June 1942) was a Dutch-born American businessman who founded the Quanah Tribune-Chief newspaper. He was the father of Fred C. Koch (1900–1967), founder of Koch Industries.

== Early life and education ==
Koch was born in the Workum, Netherlands. He was the second child of the physician Johan Anthon Koch (1836–1910) and Gatske Hotzes Jorritsma (1837–1876). Koch's paternal grandfather had been a shipowner from Sande in German East Frisia who had shipwrecked off the coast of Workum, where he eventually married the mayor's daughter. Koch's mother died during the birth of her eighth child, and his father remarried Petronella de Swart, the daughter of a banker. Harry Koch had five surviving siblings and another five half-siblings who all remained in the Netherlands. After working as a printer's apprentice in The Hague and Germany, Koch emigrated to the United States in 1888. He first lived in Dutch enclaves in Chicago and Grand Rapids, Michigan, where he worked for Dutch-language newspapers.

== Career and politics ==
Around 1890, he moved to Eastern Texas, where the humid climate soon drove him West to settle in the railroad town Quanah. At the time, Quanah had three newspapers, the Quanah Eagle, the Quanah Chief and the Quanah Tribune. He had saved enough to purchase the Quanah Tribune and then merged it with the Quanah Chief in 1897 forming the Quanah Tribune-Chief. He was also a founding shareholder of the Quanah, Acme and Pacific Railway. and co-founder of Avondale Marine Ways. Koch used his newspaper to promote this railroad as well as his libertarian political ideas. During the depression, he fiercely opposed Franklin D. Roosevelt's New Deal and wrote opinion pieces against trade unions, retirement pensions, and the regulation of banks.

== Personal life ==
In 1898, Koch married Margaret (Mattie) Mixson (1874–1941). She was the daughter of Hester (née Blessingame) and John Baptist Mixson (1851–1927) of Quanah, Texas (he was the son of Simeon Mixson and Margaret Campbell). They had two sons:

- Anton Koch worked as advertising manager at the Tribune-Chief.
- Fred C. Koch (1900–1967) went on to found Koch Industries.
