= Marshall v. Marshall =

- Supreme Court of the United States

Argued February 28, 2006 Decided May 1, 2006
- Full case name: Vickie Lynn Marshall v. E. Pierce Marshall
- Docket no.: 04-1544
- Citations: 547 U.S. 293 (more) 126 S. Ct. 1735; 2006 U.S. LEXIS 3456

Case history
- Prior: Marshall v. Marshall (In re Marshall) 253 B.R. 550 (Bankr. C.D. Cal. 2001); 257 B.R. 35 (Bankr. C.D. Cal. 2001); affirmed in part, vacated and remanded, 264 B.R. 609 (C.D. Cal. 2000); 271 B.R. 858 (C.D. Cal. 2001); 273 B.R. 822 (Bankr. C.D. Cal 2002); 275 B.R. 5 (C.D. Cal. 2002); vacated and remanded, 392 F.3d 1118 (9th Cir. 2004); cert. granted, 126 S. Ct. 35 (2005)
- Subsequent: On remand, 403 B.R. 668 (Bankr. C.D. Cal. 2009); 600 F.3d 1037 (9th Cir. 2010); affirmed, Stern v. Marshall, 564 U.S. 462 (2011).

Holding
- Jurisdiction was properly asserted by a federal district court over a widow debtor's counterclaim for tortious interference with a gift, because the judicially crafted "probate exception" to federal court jurisdiction did not apply.

Court membership
- Chief Justice John Roberts Associate Justices John P. Stevens · Antonin Scalia; Anthony Kennedy · David Souter; Clarence Thomas · Ruth Bader Ginsburg; Stephen Breyer · Samuel Alito

Case opinions
- Majority: Ginsburg, joined by Roberts, Scalia, Kennedy, Souter, Thomas, Breyer, Alito
- Concurrence: Stevens (in judgment)

Laws applied
- 28 U.S.C. § 1331, 28 U.S.C. § 1334

Marshall v. Marshall, 547 U.S. 293 (2006), is a case in which the United States Supreme Court held that a federal district court had equal or concurrent jurisdiction with state probate (will) courts over tort claims under state common law. The case drew an unusual amount of interest because the petitioner was Playboy Playmate and celebrity Anna Nicole Smith (whose legal name was Vickie Lynn Marshall). Smith won the case, but unsolved issues regarding her inheritance eventually led to another Supreme Court case, Stern v. Marshall. She died before that case was decided.

== Background ==
Twelve years prior to his marriage to Smith, J. Howard Marshall had set up a trust which owned all of his assets and would pass them to various charities and his son E. Pierce Marshall after his death. Smith had claimed that it was J. Howard's intention after marriage to set up a separate trust for her benefit, which would essentially leave her half the appreciation of the assets of the trust during the period of the marriage, but that his son Pierce had interfered with the formation of this separate trust. J. Howard Marshall neither set up a trust in Smith's favor, nor changed the terms of his will to provide for her after his death. However, he did make his existing trust irrevocable soon after his marriage to Smith. As a result, Smith was excluded from J. Howard's estate. She sued in Texas Probate Court for a share of the estate on several grounds, and her litigation was actively opposed by Marshall's son Pierce. The primary ground for the son's opposition was that his father had an extensive estate plan executed over many decades which expressed his clear wishes. Pierce also believed his father had already been quite generous to Smith during the marriage, providing Smith with both expensive gifts and monetary resources.

After receiving a default judgment against her for sexual harassment, Smith petitioned for bankruptcy in California. Pierce filed a non-dischargeability claim and proof of claim against Smith based on public statements her lawyers made to the media shortly after her husband died, accusing Pierce of frustrating J. Howard's intentions to set up a new trust for Smith and isolating his father. Pierce alleged these statements were libelous, and he successfully sued Smith's attorneys on the same grounds in Texas State Court. Smith opposed the claims and countersued Pierce on the basis her statements were true and on tort claims she was already pursuing in Texas. The Bankruptcy Court dismissed the libel claim on summary judgment and did not allow the claim to proceed to trial. After being released from bankruptcy, Smith pursued her counterclaim against Pierce, alleging he interfered with his father's intention to set up a trust in favor of Smith.

During the Texas Probate proceeding, the Bankruptcy Court awarded Smith $474 million on the basis of a sanction against Pierce, and deemed his interference to have occurred. The Federal District court subsequently vacated the Bankruptcy award and reduced Smith's award to $88 million.

However, after a five-month jury trial in Texas, the Probate Court entered a decision that J. Howard Marshall's will and trust were valid, and that his son was the primary beneficiary—rejecting Smith's claim that the son had exerted undue influence on his father, or interfered with any trust for Smith. When the matter came before the 9th Circuit appellate court, it rendered the District Court's decision invalid on jurisdictional grounds, declaring that only Texas Probate Courts had jurisdiction over probate matters. The case was also important since the Supreme Court last reviewed the probate exception in Markham v. Allen, and its analogue, the domestic relations exception, in Ankenbrandt v. Richards.

The Bush administration, which wanted to limit exceptions to federal jurisdiction in state probate related matters, instructed the United States Solicitor General to submit a brief on the side of the petitioner.

=== Questions presented ===
1. What is the scope of the probate exception to federal jurisdiction?
2. Did Congress intend the probate exception to apply where a federal court is not asked to probate a will, administer an estate, or otherwise assume control of property in the custody of a state probate court?
3. Did Congress intend the probate exception to apply to cases arising under the Constitution, laws, or treaties of the United States (28 U.S.C. § 1331), including the Bankruptcy Code (28 U.S.C. § 1334), or is it limited to cases in which jurisdiction is based on diversity of citizenship?
4. Did Congress intend the probate exception to apply to cases arising out of trusts, or is it limited to cases involving wills?

== Opinion of the Court ==
On February 28, 2006, the case was argued. May 1, 2006, the United States Supreme Court unanimously decided the case in favor of Anna Nicole Smith on the question of federal jurisdiction. The Court held that federal courts have jurisdiction to entertain suits to determine the rights of creditors, legatees, heirs, and other claimants relating to an estate, so long as the federal court does not probate a will, administer an estate, take control of assets being administered by the probate court or interfere with the probate proceedings.

== Aftermath ==
Anna Nicole Smith's dispute returned to the Supreme Court again in Stern v. Marshall (2011).
