= Anna Nicole Smith: You Don't Know Me =

2023 film

- Directed by: Ursula Macfarlane
- Produced by: Alexandra Lacey
- Distributed by: Netflix
- Release date: May 16, 2023
- Country: United States
- Language: English

Anna Nicole Smith: You Don't Know Me is a 2023 documentary film about the life of Anna Nicole Smith. It is directed by Ursula Macfarlane. It first aired on Netflix on May 16, 2023. The documentary relies heavily on archived footage taken during Smith's life.

== Critical reception ==
The film received generally negative reviews, with many reviewers agreeing that while You Don't Know Me attempts to condemn voyeurism and sensationalism, it is also guilty of them:

Courtney Howard of Variety wrote: "Although it offers a subtly stinging condemnation of celebrity voyeurism, it’s not enough to make that gut-punch land with force, and even seems guilty of the very same thing." Cady Lang of Time wrote that the documentary "tries but ultimately fails to reframe the narrative around the late model and media personality." Lang pointed out that while recent documentaries about similar scandal-prone figures from the aughts have humanized their subjects You Don't Know Me "is as preoccupied with Smith’s scandals as the media was." Calum Marsh of the New York Times wrote that the documentary's focus on scandal brought the documentary, "despite Macfarlane’s well-meaning efforts, squarely into the territory of what it’s attempting to condemn: lurid voyeurism."
