= J. Howard Marshall =

American business magnate (1905–1995)

- Marshall in 1954
- Born: James Howard Marshall II; January 24, 1905; Philadelphia, Pennsylvania, U.S.
- Died: August 4, 1995 (aged 90); Houston, Texas, U.S.
- Education: Haverford College (BA); Yale University (LLB)
- Occupations: Businessman, government official, lawyer, legal scholar
- Spouse(s): Eleanor Pierce (m. 1931; div. 1961) Bettye Bohannon (m. 1961; died 1991) Anna Nicole Smith (m. 1994)
- Children: J. Howard Marshall III; E. Pierce Marshall

James Howard Marshall II (January 24, 1905 – August 4, 1995) was an American businessman, government official, lawyer, and legal scholar. He was involved with and invested in the petroleum industry via his academic, government and commercial endeavors.

Marshall's career included work for both oil companies, like Standard Oil of California (later Chevron) and Signal Oil & Gas, and for regulators in the national Government of the United States, Department of the Interior and the World War II Petroleum Administration for War. In 1952, Marshall co-founded Great Northern Oil Company and the Minnesota Pipe Line, which later got taken over by Koch, Inc in exchange for 16 percent of the Koch organization stock.

Marshall was married to American model Anna Nicole Smith during the last 14 months of his life. His estate including the Koch shares became the subject of protracted litigation over whether the estate should go to Smith or family members of Marshall, which was reviewed by the Supreme Court in Marshall v. Marshall and Stern v. Marshall.

== Early life and education ==
Marshall in his 1926 yearbook picture at Haverford College

Born in the Germantown section of Philadelphia, and raised a Quaker, J. Howard Marshall II attended George School, a private high school in Newtown, Pennsylvania, and then studied liberal arts at Haverford College, both Quaker institutions, graduating in 1926. While at George School and Haverford, he edited the school newspapers, captained the debate teams, was an All American soccer player, and played competitive tennis under the instruction of professional Bill Tilden. He graduated magna cum laude from Yale Law School in 1931. At Yale, he was case editor of the Yale Law Journal and studied with law and economics pioneer Walton Hale Hamilton.

== Careers ==
Upon graduation, from 1931 to 1933, he served as an Assistant Dean at Yale Law School and instructed courses in business, finance and procedure, while also publishing articles as a member of the influential legal realism school of thought.

He worked with future Supreme Court Justice William O. Douglas on an article titled A Factual Study of Bankruptcy Administration and Some Suggestions, published in 1932. Along with Norman Meyers, he published two articles titled Legal Planning of Petroleum Production in 1931. These pioneering studies offered an alternative to the then-prevailing practices of controlled production in the petroleum industry, which were leading to dramatic boom-bust cycles. They gained the interest within the Roosevelt Administration, as primary legal architects of the New Deal were supporters of legal realism.

In 1933, Marshall left Yale to become the Assistant Solicitor at the Department of the Interior under Harold L. Ickes. He authored the Code of Fair Competition for the Petroleum Industry (1933), and the Connally Hot Oil Act of 1935 after the Supreme Court's decision to strike down the National Industrial Recovery Act. It revived legislation that regulated the flow of oil between states to protect the industry from "contraband oil" in order to stabilize falling prices. While Ickes originally considered having the government set a price floor for oil, Marshall got Ickes to sign off on a plan to require certificates of clearance for legally produced oil shipped in interstate commerce.

In 1935, he left government service to become the special counsel to Kenneth R. Kingsbury, the president of Standard Oil of California (now Chevron Corporation) in San Francisco, California. In 1937, he became a partner at Pillsbury Madison Sutro (now Pillsbury Winthrop Shaw Pittman), which was the company's outside counsel. It was at Standard Oil of California that he began a lifelong business association and friendship with his mentor Ralph K. Davies.

In 1941, he returned to Washington, D.C. during World War II as Solicitor of the Petroleum Administration for War as one of the dollar-a-year men, helping develop U.S. energy policy and manage the domestic petroleum industry during the war, including the Cole Pipeline Act of 1941. In 1944, after developing a relationship with Paul G. Blazer, he moved to Ashland, Kentucky and became Vice Chairman and President of Ashland Oil and Refining Co. (now Ashland Inc.). His transition to Ashland, was interrupted in 1945 when President Harry S. Truman appointed Marshall Solicitor of the United States delegation to the Allied Reparations Committee, serving under Ambassador Edwin W. Pauley. He participated in the negotiations in Moscow and later at the Potsdam Conference in Berlin. In 1946, he drafted the executive order creating the National Petroleum Council (US) and served as member and director in addition to serving as director of the American Petroleum Institute.

In 1952, he became Executive Vice President at Signal Oil & Gas under Samuel B. Mosher in Los Angeles, California. Marshall negotiated with Mosher to allow him to use 1/3 of his time for his own activities, the other 2/3 for Signal. In 1960, he became President of Union Texas Petroleum and moved to Houston, Texas. In 1967, after the merger of Union Texas Petroleum into Allied Chemical, he became Executive Vice President and director of Allied Chemical (now Honeywell), until his retirement from corporate life in 1969. From 1969 forward, he was focused on his independent ventures.

Marshall remained active in the energy industry through many personal endeavors and directorships with Great Northern Oil Company, Minnesota Pipe Line, Koch Industries, Coastal Corporation (now El Paso Corporation), Independent Refining, International Oil and Gas, various exploration syndicates and culminating in 1984, when he founded Marshall Petroleum, Inc, to consolidate his various investments in the petroleum industry and to drill for oil and gas. Marshall turned most of his business associations into friendships; including Ralph K. Davies, Samuel B. Mosher, J.R. Parten, Fred C. Koch and his sons, Oscar Wyatt and E.O. Buck.

=== Koch Industries ===
In 1952, Marshall co-founded Great Northern Oil Company (now Koch, Inc.) and Minnesota Pipe Line, which, in 1955, built the Pine Bend Refinery in Rosemount, Minnesota and the pipelines to supply the refinery with heavy, sour Canadian crude oil produced in Saskatchewan, Canada. In 1959, Fred Koch acquired a 35% interest in Great Northern Oil Co. for $5 million. In 1965, Unocal Corporation acquired a 40% interest in Great Northern Oil Co (via Woodley Petroleum and Pure Oil) and later attempted to consolidate the company while buying out the remaining shareholders. Marshall and Charles Koch prevented the takeover and kept the company privately held. In 1969, Charles Koch and Marshall agreed to exchange Marshall's 16% interest in Great Northern Oil Co for an interest in Koch Industries which led to the eventual purchase of Unocal's interest in 1970.

== Personal life ==
=== Marriages and relationships ===
Marshall married Eleanor Pierce in 1931 and divorced in 1961. They had two sons together: J. Howard Marshall III (born February 6, 1936) and E. Pierce Marshall (January 12, 1939 – June 20, 2006). His second marriage, to Bettye Bohannon, lasted from 1961 until her death from Alzheimer's disease in 1991.

In 1994, at the age of 89, he married 26-year-old model Anna Nicole Smith. This was his third marriage and her second marriage. Their marriage lasted until his death 14 months later.

=== Eldest son left out of estate ===
In 1980, Marshall's eldest son, J. Howard Marshall III, sided with Bill Koch, Frederick R. Koch and other collateral family members in dispute with Charles Koch and David H. Koch over making Koch Industries a public company and paying larger dividends. Marshall purchased back company stock from his son, given previously as a gift, for $8 million, considered to be a premium price, and removed the eldest son from his will and testament. Conversely, during the same dispute, his youngest son E. Pierce Marshall sided with his father, Charles and David Koch.

=== Death and ensuing lawsuits ===
On August 4, 1995, Marshall died of pneumonia at age 90 in Houston, Texas. Following Marshall's death, Anna Nicole Smith (who died on February 8, 2007) became involved in a court battle with her former stepson, E. Pierce Marshall (who died on June 20, 2006). J. Howard's will and trust did not include Anna Nicole or J. Howard's other son, J. Howard Marshall III. Anna Nicole and J. Howard III both sought to overturn the will and trust. In 2001, they both lost their cases during a six-month Texas state court jury trial.

During the probate proceedings, Smith declared bankruptcy in California and was awarded $474 million as a sanction for E. Pierce Marshall’s alleged misconduct in discovery. In 2002, the bankruptcy judgment was vacated and Smith’s award was reduced to $88 million in a United States district court in California. In December 2004, a three-judge panel of the United States Court of Appeals for the Ninth Circuit vacated the District Court decision under the probate exception, ruling that the federal courts lacked subject matter jurisdiction over state probate matters. The Ninth Circuit decision also affirmed the primacy of Texas Probate decision which determined that no misconduct had taken place and that Smith was not one of J. Howard Marshall's heirs.

However, on May 1, 2006, the Supreme Court of the United States in Marshall v. Marshall reversed the Ninth Circuit's decision regarding the probate exception, allowing Smith another opportunity to pursue her claims in federal court. The case was remanded to the Ninth Circuit for adjudication of the remaining appellate issues. On June 25, 2009, the same three-judge panel of the United States Court of Appeals for the Ninth Circuit heard oral arguments on the remaining appellate issues. On March 19, 2010, the United States Court of Appeals for the Ninth Circuit issued its second opinion on remand, finding in favor of E. Pierce Marshall, that the California Bankruptcy Court did not have jurisdiction and the California Federal District Court was precluded from reviewing matters already decided in the Texas Probate Court.

On September 28, 2010, the U.S. Supreme Court again agreed to hear the case. On June 23, 2011, the United States Supreme court decided the case in a 5–4 decision in favor of the Marshall family (now styled Stern v. Marshall 10-179). The majority of the Court decided Congress cannot constitutionally authorize non-Article III bankruptcy judges final order jurisdiction on state law based counterclaims to proofs of claim which are not necessary to resolve the claim itself.

Marshall's eldest son, J. Howard Marshall III, lost his case in Texas probate court and also lost a counterclaim against him for fraud with malice. The jury originally awarded E. Pierce Marshall $35 million in damages but the probate court reduced that amount to $10 million. J. Howard Marshall III then filed for bankruptcy in California and was discharged by the same bankruptcy judge that had administered Smith's bankruptcy. This decision was affirmed by the United States Court of Appeals for the Ninth Circuit.

=== Dispute over pledge to alma mater ===
In 1976, Marshall pledged $4 million to his alma mater, Haverford College. However, by the time of his death in 1995, Marshall had only contributed $2 million. Haverford sued his estate in a Houston probate court; in April 2003, a jury found that Haverford had not been injured because it had not relied on Marshall's pledges.

== See also ==
- History of the petroleum industry in the United States

== Bibliography ==
- "Done in Oil: An Autobiography of J. Howard Marshall II". College Station, Texas: Texas A&M University Press. 1994.
- Frey, John W.; Ide, H. Chandler (2005). A History of the Petroleum Administration for War. Honolulu, Hawaii: University Press of the Pacific. ISBN 1-4102-2195-4.
- Scott, Otto J. (1968). The Exception: The Story of Ashland Oil & Refining Company. New York, New York: McGraw-Hill Book Company, Inc. ASIN B000L2HYBK.
