= Frederick R. Koch =

American philanthropist (1933–2020)

Frederick Koch
- Born: Frederick Robinson Koch; August 26, 1933; Wichita, Kansas, U.S.
- Died: February 12, 2020 (aged 86); New York City, U.S.
- Education: Harvard University (BA); Yale University (MFA)
- Occupations: Collector of rare books, manuscripts, and American drawings
- Organization(s): Frederick R. Koch Foundation; Sutton Place Foundation
- Known for: Philanthropy to art and book collections; Morgan Library & Museum, Frick Collection and Carnegie Museum of Art Pittsburgh, restoration of historic buildings in US, England, Austria and France
- Board member of: Film Society of Lincoln Center, Metropolitan Opera, and Spoleto Festival, The Royal Shakespeare Company
- Parent(s): Fred C. Koch; Mary Robinson
- Relatives: Charles Koch (brother); David Koch (brother); Bill Koch (brother)

Frederick Robinson Koch (/koʊk/ KOHK; August 26, 1933 – February 12, 2020) was an American collector and philanthropist, the eldest of the four sons born to American industrialist Fred Chase Koch, founder of what is now Koch Industries, and Mary Clementine (née Robinson) Koch.

== Early life and education ==
Koch was born in Wichita, Kansas. His paternal grandfather, Harry Koch, was a Dutch immigrant, who founded the Quanah Tribune-Chief newspaper and was a founding shareholder of Quanah, Acme & Pacific Railway. Among his maternal great-great-grandparents were William Ingraham Kip, an Episcopal bishop; and Elizabeth Clementine Stedman, a writer.

Beginning in eighth grade, Koch attended a boarding school called Pembroke-Country Day School in Kansas City, Missouri. He attended high school at Hackley School in Tarrytown, New York.

Koch studied humanities at Harvard College and graduated with a Bachelor of Arts degree in 1955. His father and his three younger brothers, Charles G. Koch and twins David H. Koch and William I. Koch, studied chemical engineering at Massachusetts Institute of Technology and pursued business careers. After college, Koch enlisted in the U.S. Navy, serving in Millington, Tennessee and then on the aircraft carrier USS Saratoga. Upon his return to civilian life, Koch enrolled at the Yale School of Drama, where his focus was playwriting. He received a Master of Fine Arts degree from the school in 1961.

== Philanthropy ==
Through personal and foundation acquisitions, Koch assembled large and important collections of photographs, rare books, literary and musical manuscripts, and fine and decorative arts. Works of the nineteenth and twentieth centuries predominated in his collections. Among his private collections is the archival estate of George Platt Lynes and a vast archive of the works of society photographer Jerome Zerbe.

The Frederick R. Koch Foundation, which he founded, is a major donor to the Morgan Library & Museum and Frick Collection in New York City and to the Carnegie Museum of Art in Pittsburgh. Of particular note are The Frederick R. Koch Collections at the Harvard Theater Collection, Houghton Library at Harvard University, and at Yale University's Beinecke Rare Book and Manuscript Library. Yale president Richard C. Levin described the Koch collection as "one of the greatest collections to come to Yale since the year of its founding."

Starting in the 1980s, Koch bought, restored and maintained a number of historic properties in the United States and abroad. These properties include the Donahue house, a Woolworth mansion in Manhattan; the Habsburg hunting lodge Schloss Blühnbach near Salzburg, Austria; the Romanesque Villa Torre Clementina in Cap Martin, France; and Elm Court, a Tudor Gothic manse in Butler, Pennsylvania. Koch financed the reconstruction of the Royal Shakespeare Company's Swan Theater in England from its 1879 remains, although his role as the project's patron was kept secret for years.

In 1990, Koch bought Sutton Place near Guildford, Surrey, England. Sutton Place is the former residence of J. Paul Getty and the meeting place of Henry VIII and Anne Boleyn. Koch purchased the property from another reclusive art collector, Stanley J. Seeger. He "redecorated the house and hung his art collection, but is said never to have spent a night under its roof before selling it for £32m" in 1999. Other sources say he operated it as the Sutton Place Foundation, open to the public for more than 25 years, and that he ultimately sold the property in 2005.

Koch served for many years on the boards of directors of the Spoleto Festival and The Royal Shakespeare Company. In 2010, The New Yorker reported that Koch had "moved to Monaco, which has no income tax." Despite lavish philanthropy and millions spent on art acquisitions and property restoration, Koch was said to have a frugal streak. He reportedly "prefers taking the public bus in New York and typically flies commercial," according to Vanity Fair.

== Personal life ==
Frederick Koch's sexual orientation has been the subject of frequent speculation by those close to him as well as the general public. Friends and family have called it an "open secret" that he was gay, and his brothers' suspicions regarding Fred's sexuality were central to a failed attempt to blackmail him into giving up his shares in Koch Industries. Fred consistently denied being gay, however, and told journalist Daniel Schulman that "Charles' 'homosexual blackmail' to get control of my shares did not succeed for the simple reason that I am not homosexual."

== Legal battles ==
Frederick Koch and his younger brother Bill had inherited stock in Koch Industries. In June 1983, after a bitter legal and boardroom battle, the stakes of Frederick and Bill were bought out for $1.1 billion, and Charles Koch and David Koch became majority owners in the company. Legal disputes against Charles and David lasted roughly two decades. Frederick and Bill sided with J. Howard Marshall III, J. Howard Marshall II's eldest son, against Charles and David at one point, in order to take over the company. In 2001, Bill reached a settlement in a lawsuit where he had alleged that the company was taking oil from federal and Indian land; this settlement ended all litigation between the brothers. CBS News reported that Koch Industries settled for $25 million.

== Death ==
Koch died of heart failure at his home in Manhattan on February 12, 2020, at the age of 86.

== See also ==
- Koch family
