= Daniel Schulman (writer) =

American journalist

Daniel Schulman is an American author and journalist. He is the deputy editor of news and politics at Mother Jones. In 2014, he wrote the book Sons of Wichita, a biography of the Koch family., and in 2023, he published The Money Kings: The Epic Story of the Jewish Immigrants Who Transformed Wall Street and Shaped Modern America.

In 2015, Schulman, along with David Corn, released a story in Mother Jones questioning whether Bill O'Reilly's story about his coverage of the Falklands War was accurate.
