= Stern v. Marshall =

- Supreme Court of the United States

Argued January 18, 2011 Decided June 23, 2011
- Full case name: Howard K. Stern, Executor of the Estate of Vickie Lynn Marshall, Petitioner v. Elaine T. Marshall, Executrix of the Estate of E. Pierce Marshall
- Docket no.: 10-179
- Citations: 564 U.S. 462 (more) 131 S. Ct. 2594; 180 L. Ed. 2d 475; 2011 U.S. LEXIS 4791; 79 U.S.L.W. 4564; Bankr. L. Rep. (CCH) ¶ 82,032; 65 Collier Bankr. Cas. 2d (MB) 827; 55 Bankr. Ct. Dec. 1; 22 Fla. L. Weekly Fed. S 1232
- Argument: Oral argument
- Opinion announcement: Opinion announcement

Case history
- Prior: Marshall v. Marshall (In re Marshall) 253 B.R. 550 (Bankr. C.D. Cal. 2001); affirmed in part, vacated and remanded, 264 B.R. 609 (C.D. Cal. 2000); 275 B.R. 5 (C.D. Cal. 2002); reversed and remanded with instructions 600 F.3d 1037 (9th Cir. 2010); cert. granted, 131 S. Ct. 2594 (2011)

Holding
- The U.S. Bankruptcy Court lacked the constitutional authority to enter a final judgment on a state law counterclaim that is not resolved in the process of ruling on a creditor’s proof of claim, even though they are granted statutory authority under 28 U.S.C. §157 (b)2(C).

Court membership
- Chief Justice John Roberts Associate Justices Antonin Scalia · Anthony Kennedy; Clarence Thomas · Ruth Bader Ginsburg; Stephen Breyer · Samuel Alito; Sonia Sotomayor · Elena Kagan

Case opinions
- Majority: Roberts, joined by Scalia, Kennedy, Thomas, Alito
- Concurrence: Scalia
- Dissent: Breyer, joined by Ginsburg, Sotomayor, Kagan

Laws applied
- 28 U.S.C. § 1331, 28 U.S.C. § 1334, 28 U.S.C. § 157

Stern v. Marshall, 564 U.S. 462 (2011), was a United States Supreme Court case in which the Court held that a bankruptcy court, as a non-Article III court (i.e., courts without full judicial independence) lacked constitutional authority under Article III of the United States Constitution to enter a final judgment on a state law counterclaim that is not resolved in the process of ruling on a creditor's proof of claim, even though Congress purported to grant such statutory authority under 28 U.S.C. § 157(b)2(C). The case drew an unusual amount of interest because the petitioner was the estate of former Playboy Playmate and celebrity Anna Nicole Smith (whose legal name was Vickie Lynn Marshall). Smith died in 2007, before the Court decided the case, which her estate lost.

== Background ==
Playboy Playmate and celebrity Anna Nicole Smith married wealthy 89-year-old oil magnate J. Howard Marshall, and he died 14 months later, in 1995. When it appeared she had been excluded from his estate, she sued in Texas state probate court, sparking a long and acrimonious series of litigations between herself and Marshall's son E. Pierce Marshall. At one point, a federal district court determined that Smith was owed $88 million from the estate, while the state probate court determined that she was not owed any such substantial sum. The U.S. Supreme Court determined that the federal district court had jurisdiction to rule on the award in Marshall v. Marshall (2006).

The case was sent back to the 9th Circuit Court of Appeals to decide other remaining issues. On March 19, 2010, the same three-judge panel found in favor of E. Pierce Marshall holding that the bankruptcy court did not have the authority to decide the case, and, because the California federal district court should not have reviewed matters previously decided in the Texas probate court, the $88 million judgment for Smith was void. Following the 9th Circuit's decision, lawyers for the estate of Anna Nicole Smith requested the appeal be heard before the entire circuit. However, on May 5, 2010, that request was denied. On September 28, 2010, the U.S. Supreme Court again agreed to hear the case.

Article III, § 1 of the Constitution vests "[t]he judicial power of the United States" in life-tenured and salary-protected judges, who are nominated by the President and confirmed by the Senate. Non-Article III bankruptcy judges may not exercise the general judicial power of the United States and therefore may not finally resolve controversies that are not within the core Article I bankruptcy power Congress relied upon in creating the current system of bankruptcy jurisdiction. In Northern Pipeline Co. v. Marathon Pipe Line Co., 458 U.S. 50 (1982), a fractured plurality of the Court held that Article I bankruptcy courts could not constitutionally hear a state law breach of contract claim when the debtor was the plaintiff. The main question presented in Stern v. Marshall was whether a bankruptcy court could constitutionally enter a final judgment on an otherwise non-core tort cause of action asserted as a compulsory counterclaim to a creditor's nondischargeability complaint and proof of claim against the debtor. When the matter came before the 9th Circuit Court of Appeals it rendered the District Court's decision invalid on preclusion grounds since the Bankruptcy Court's decision was non-core.

The Obama administration and the Executive Office of the United States Trustee, which wanted to expand bankruptcy jurisdiction in state law matters, instructed the United States Solicitor General to submit a brief on the side of the petitioner.

=== Questions presented ===
1. Whether the Ninth Circuit opinion, which renders §157(b)(2)(C) surplusage in light of §157(b)(2)(B), contravenes Congress's intent in enacting §157(b)(2)(C).
2. Whether Congress may, under Articles I and III, constitutionally authorize core jurisdiction over debtors' compulsory counterclaims to proofs of claim.
3. Whether the Ninth Circuit misapplied Marathon and Katchen and contravened the Court's post-Marathon precedent, creating a circuit split in the process, by holding that Congress cannot constitutionally authorize non-Article III bankruptcy judges to enter final judgment on all compulsory counterclaims to proofs of claim.

== Opinion of the Court ==
On June 23, 2011, the United States Supreme Court issued its opinion in the case (now styled Stern v. Marshall, no. 10-179). The majority of the Court held Congress cannot constitutionally authorize non-Article III bankruptcy judges to enter a final judgment on a state law counterclaim that is not resolved in the process of ruling on a creditor’s proof of claim. The four dissenting judges argued that such broad powers are necessary to implement legislative intent and authority under Article I and concerns about the reduced efficiency of the bankruptcy courts.

This decision effectively ended the case and let stand the decision that Smith's estate was not entitled to the money that had previously been awarded to her.

== Broader context ==
The length of the proceedings led the Chief Justice to compare it to the infamous fictional lawsuit Jarndyce v Jarndyce in Charles Dickens's novel Bleak House, which dragged on for over a century and brought nothing but ruin to the parties. This dispute started around 1996. E. Pierce Marshall died in 2006, about a month after the Marshall v. Marshall decision, and Anna Nicole Smith died in 2007. However, litigation continued, with E. Pierce Marshall's widow Elaine and Smith's estate executor, Howard K. Stern, lawyer Philip W. Boesch Jr. representing Smith's minor daughter Dannielynn Birkhead and her father. Stern v. Marshall ended with a ruling against Anna Nicole Smith's estate. However, as of 2017, additional heirs of J. Howard Marshall were still contesting the estate in the Texas probate court, 22 years after his death. The litigation again made news when Judge Mike Wood recused himself that year, citing exhaustion from dealing with the case and the parties. Smith's bankruptcy case was finally closed on October 24, 2022, more than 25 years after it began.

== See also ==
- Justice delayed is justice denied
