= Fred C. Koch =

American chemical engineer and entrepreneur (1900–1967)

- Born: Fred Chase Koch; September 23, 1900; Quanah, Texas, U.S.
- Died: November 17, 1967 (aged 67); Bear River near Ogden, Utah, U.S.
- Education: Rice University; Massachusetts Institute of Technology (BS)
- Occupations: Chemical engineer; businessman
- Known for: Founder of Koch Industries; Co-founder of John Birch Society
- Spouse: Mary Clementine Robinson
- Children: Frederick R. Koch; Charles G. Koch; David H. Koch; William I. Koch
- Parent: Harry Koch (father)

Fred Chase Koch (/koʊk/ KOHK; September 23, 1900 – November 17, 1967) was an American chemical engineer and entrepreneur who founded the oil refinery firm that later became Koch Industries, a privately held company which – under the principal ownership and leadership of Koch's sons Charles and David – would be listed by Forbes as the second-largest privately held company in the United States in 2015.

== Early life and education ==
Fred C. Koch was born in Quanah, Texas, the son of Mattie B. (née Mixson) and Harry Koch, a Dutch immigrant. Harry had begun working as a printer's apprentice in Workum, Netherlands. He worked over a year at printers' shops, in The Hague and in Germany, before coming to the U.S. in 1888, where he bought the Tribune-Chief newspaper. Fred attended Rice Institute in Houston from 1917 to 1919 and graduated from the Massachusetts Institute of Technology (MIT) in 1922, where he obtained a degree in chemical engineering practice.

== Business career ==
Koch started his career with the Texas Company in Port Arthur, Texas, and later became chief engineer with the Medway Oil & Storage Company on the Isle of Grain in Kent, England. In 1925 he joined a fellow MIT classmate, P.C. Keith, at Keith-Winkler Engineering in Wichita, Kansas. Following the departure of Keith in 1925, the firm became Winkler-Koch Engineering Company.

In 1927, Koch developed a more efficient thermal cracking process for deriving gasoline from crude oil, which allowed smaller players in the industry to better compete with the major oil producers. He invented this technology five years after he graduated from MIT. A consortium of large companies quickly sued in response, filing 44 different lawsuits against Koch, embroiling him in litigation for years. Koch prevailed in all but one suit (which would later be overturned, due to the judge having been bribed).

In 1925, Koch had entered into a partnership with Lewis Winkler, a former employee of Universal Oil Products (which is now UOP LLC). Winkler developed a cracking apparatus for heavy crude oil with, ostensibly, no patented difference in comparison to his former employer's intellectual property; thus, in 1929, UOP sued Winkler-Koch for patent infringement. Also that year, nearly three years before the patent case went to trial, Winkler-Koch signed contracts to build petroleum distillation plants in the Soviet Union, which did not recognize intellectual property rights.

This extended litigation blocked Winkler-Koch from selling the technology in the U.S. for several years. In the words of Jane Mayer, "Unable to succeed at home, Koch found work in the Soviet Union." Between 1929 and 1932 Winkler-Koch supported the Kremlin and "trained Bolshevik engineers to help Stalin's regime set up fifteen modern oil refineries" in the Soviet Union during its first five-year plan. According to Mayer, "Over time ... Stalin brutally purged several of Koch's Soviet colleagues. Koch was deeply affected by the experience, and regretted his collaboration." The company also built installations in countries throughout Europe, the Middle East and Asia. During the 21st century, when the political donations of Koch's descendants became a matter of controversy, Koch's work in Europe also entered public scrutiny. In 1934, Koch had partnered with William Rhodes Davis to build the Hamburg Oil Refinery, the third-largest oil refinery serving the Third Reich, a project which was personally approved by Adolf Hitler; contemporary critics claim this showed a direct tie between fascism and the modern conservative movement, notwithstanding Koch's much greater involvement in the Soviet Union. In response, Koch President and COO David L. Robertson acknowledged that Winkler-Koch provided the cracking unit for the 1934 Hamburg refinery, but said that it was but one of many "iconic" American companies doing business in Germany at the time. Robertson provided archival documents showing that from 1928 to 1934, Koch's company helped build 39 cracking units for heavy oil refineries, including ones located in England and France.

Having succeeded in securing the family fortune, Koch joined new partners in 1940 to create the Wood River Oil and Refining Company, which later became known as Koch Industries. In 1946, the firm acquired the Rock Island refinery and crude oil gathering system near Duncan, Oklahoma. Wood River was later renamed the Rock Island Oil and Refining Company. In 1966, he turned over day-to-day management of the company to his son, Charles Koch.

== Personal life and death ==
In 1932, Koch married Mary Clementine Robinson in Kansas City, Missouri. Mary was the daughter of a prominent Kansas City physician, Ernest Franklin Robinson, who helped to found the University of Kansas School of Medicine, and Mary Burnet Kip, who died at an early age. Her mother Mary was the paternal granddaughter of William Ingraham Kip, the Episcopal missionary bishop to California; and the maternal granddaughter of William Burnet Kinney, ambassador to Italy, and his wife, author Elizabeth Stedman (née Dodge). The Kochs had four sons: Frederick (1933–2020), Charles (b. 1935), and twins David (1940–2019) and William (b. 1940). He died in Utah in late 1967 at 67.

Fred Koch had a long history of heart problems. His son David described in 2010 how he received word that his father had died: "Father was on a hunting trip bird-shooting in Utah. He was in a blind with a gun loader next to him. He was having heart palpitations and wasn't shooting that well. Finally a lone bird came over. He took the shot and hit it square. The duck falls from the air. He turns to the loader and says, 'Boy, that was a magnificent shot,' and then keels over dead."

== Political views ==
In 1928, Koch traveled to the Soviet Union to build oil refineries, but he came to despise communism and Joseph Stalin's regime. Koch self-published a 39-page, anti-communist pamphlet "A Business Man Looks at Communism" relating his experiences in the Soviet Union and warning of the threat of Communist take-over. Koch wrote that one of the "Potential Methods of Communist Take-over in U.S.A. by Internal Subversion" was "Infiltration of high offices of government and political parties until the President of the U.S. is a Communist... Even the Vice Presidency would do as it could be easily arranged for the President to commit suicide." He wrote that "socialism is the precursor to communism," that the Soviet Union was "a land of hunger, misery, and terror", and that he toured the countryside and received what he wrote was a "liberal education in Communist techniques and methods." Koch grew persuaded that the Soviet threat needed to be countered in America.

According to journalist Daniel Schulman, writing in Sons of Wichita: How the Koch Brothers Became America's Most Powerful and Private Dynasty, upon his return to the United States, Koch "saw evidence for communist infiltration everywhere" and the pamphlet was "a forceful, though deeply paranoid polemic intended to jar Americans from their apathy." According to his son, Charles, "Many of the Soviet engineers he worked with were longtime Bolsheviks who had helped bring on the revolution." It deeply bothered Fred Koch that so many of those so committed to the Communist cause were later purged. According to his son, David, his father "was a very conservative Republican and was not a fan of big government," and was paranoid about communism. David told author Brian Doherty his father "was constantly speaking to us children about what was wrong with government and government policy. It's something I grew up with – but a fundamental point of view that big government was bad, and impositions of government controls on our lives and economic fortunes was not good."

In 1958, Koch became a founding member of the John Birch Society, a right-wing American political advocacy group that opposes communist infiltration and supports limited government. Koch held John Birch Society chapter meetings in the basement of his family's home in Wichita, Kansas.

Also in 1958, Koch helped amend the constitution of the state of Kansas to make Kansas a right-to-work state.
