= Prescription drug addiction =

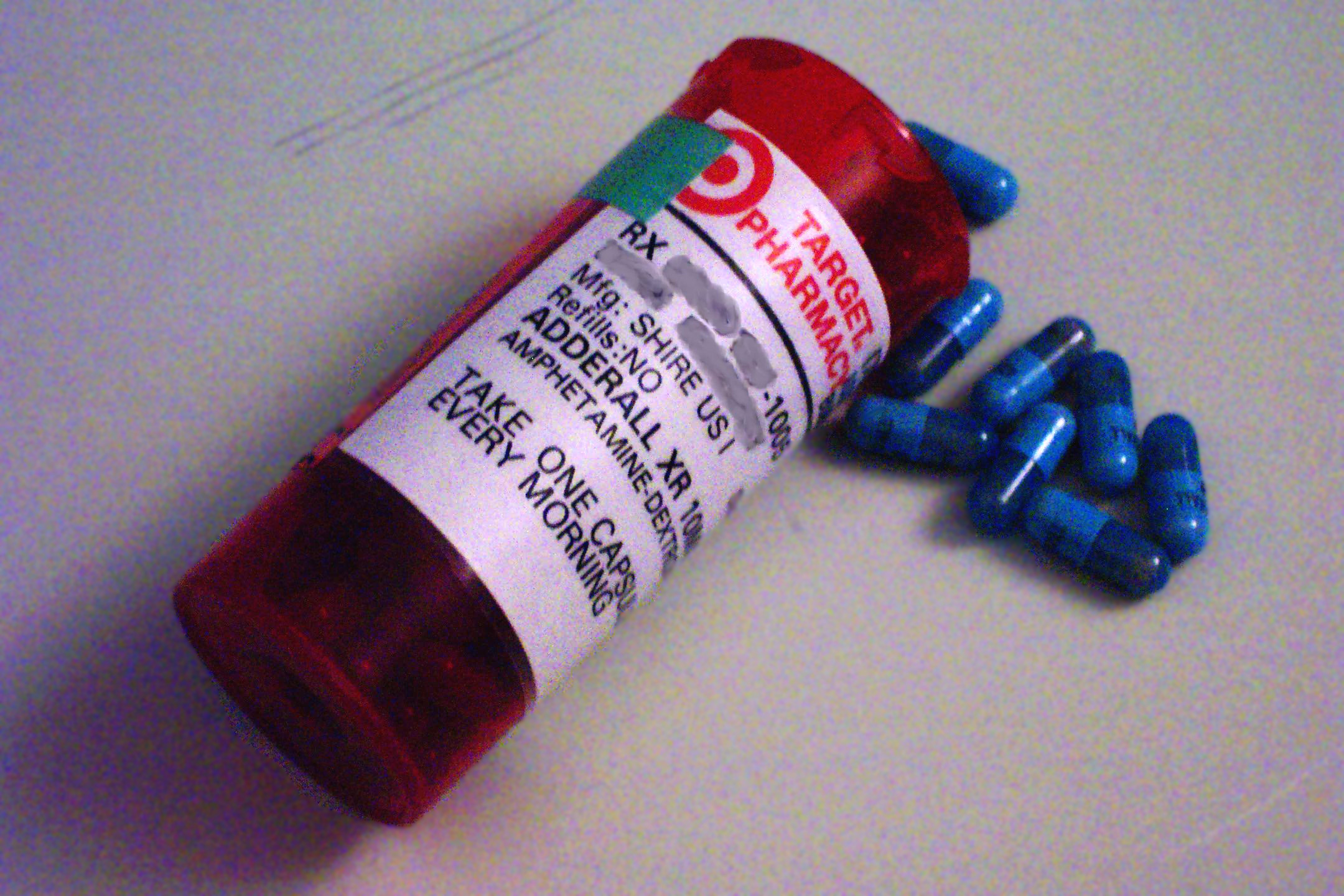
- Adderall is a commonly abused stimulant drug containing amphetamine.
- Specialty: Psychiatry, clinical psychology
- Complications: Drug overdose
- Frequency: Estimated over 3.43 million prescription opioid users and 3.42 million prescription stimulant users worldwide.

Prescription drug addiction is the chronic, repeated use of a prescription drug in ways other than prescribed for, including using someone else's prescription. A prescription drug is a pharmaceutical drug that may not be dispensed without a legal medical prescription. Drugs in this category are supervised due to their potential for misuse and substance use disorder. The classes of medications most commonly abused are opioids, central nervous system (CNS) depressants and central nervous stimulants. In particular, prescription opioid is most commonly abused in the form of prescription analgesics.

Prescription drug addiction was recognized as a significant public health and law enforcement problem worldwide in the past decade due to its medical and social consequences. Particularly, the United States declared a public health emergency regarding increased drug overdoses in 2017. Since then, multiple public health organizations have emphasized the importance of prevention, early diagnosis and treatments of prescription drug addiction to address this public health issue.

== Causes and risk factors ==
There are multiple risk factors that can increase the chance of developing drug addiction, including patient factors, nature of drug and over-prescription.

=== Patient factors ===
Studies have indicated that adolescents and young adults were particularly vulnerable to prescription drug abuse. People with acute or chronic pain, anxiety disorders and ADHD were at increased risk for addiction comorbidity. History of illicit drug use and substance use disorder were consistently identified as risk factors for prescription drug abuse.

Misuse of opioid analgesics is frequently associated with mental health disorder, including depression, posttraumatic stress disorder, and anxiety disorders. Some risk factors for opioid and benzodiazepine sedatives or tranquilizers addiction are white race, female sex, panic symptoms, other psychiatric symptoms, alcohol and cigarette dependence and history of illicit drug use. Addiction to pharmaceutical stimulants have been predominantly among adolescents and young adults.

=== Drug characteristics ===
Patients who have been prescribed medications to treat a health condition or disorder are shown to be more vulnerable to prescription drug abuse and addiction, especially when the prescribed medicine falls into the same drug classes of common illicit drugs. For example, methylphenidate and amphetamines are in the same stimulant category as cocaine and methamphetamine, while hydrocodone and oxycodone are under the opioid category as heroin.

Key pharmacological factors associated with drug addiction include:

- high frequency of drug use
- high doses administered
- rapid rate of onset of action
- high drug potency
- co-ingestion of psychoactive substances with similar (eg. sedatives and alcohol) or different pharmacological profiles (eg. stimulants and nicotine) can result in additional reinforcement of addiction.

=== Over-prescription and doctor shopping ===
Health practitioners can prescribe drugs in a number of ways that inadvertently and unintentionally contribute to prescription drug abuse. They may inappropriately prescribe drugs due to influence by ill-informed, careless or deceptive patients or by succumbing to patient pressure.

The American Medical Association describes four mechanism by which a physician becomes involved in overprescribing in its four-"Ds" model:

1. Dated: the physician is outdated regarding knowledge of pharmacology and the differential diagnosis and management of diseases.
2. Duped: the physician may be vulnerable to a manipulative patient.
3. Dishonest: a dishonest physician may be motivated to write prescriptions for controlled substances under financial incentives.
4. Disabled: a physician with medical or psychiatric disability such that they have "loose" standards in prescribing controlled substances.

The above over-prescription practices can lead to the aggravation of prescription drug addiction.

A person may also gain access to prescription drugs via doctor shopping. "Doctor shopping" describes a practice in which a person searches for multiple sources of drugs by visiting different health practitioners and presenting a different list of complaints to each practitioner; the patient will then obtain multiple prescriptions and fill them at different pharmacies.

=== Society and Culture ===
Media and Activism

Prescription drug addiction is a major public health issue in the United States. According to the National Institute on Drug Abuse, approximately 2.7 million people met the criteria for a prescription opioid use disorder in 2021, and prescription opioids were involved in over 16,000 overdose deaths that year. This scale of harm demonstrates why public narratives – shaped by both media and activist communities – play such an important role in how society defines and responds to addiction.

Media Framing of Prescription Drug Addiction

Media organizations serve as powerful claims makers in defining prescription drug addiction as a social problem. A scoping review by Bosworth and colleagues examined sixteen studies of media portrayals of people with substance use disorders and found that coverage frequently depicted them as dangerous, criminal, or unstable, while only a small portion emphasized treatment or recovery. These portrayals reinforce stigma and shape public assumptions about the causes of addiction and the types of people affected by it.

Van Draanen and Erickson analyzed eighteen years of coverage in The Globe and Mail and found that early reporting relied heavily on criminal justice framing, using terms such as “misuse,” “abuse,” and “diversion.” However, as overdose deaths increased, the newspaper gradually incorporated more public-health language. This shift had political consequences: policymakers began referring to addiction using more structural explanations, including overprescribing, pharmaceutical marketing, and socioeconomic factors. Their findings show that media framing not only influences public understanding but also shapes the tone and content of policy discussions.

Kresovich and colleagues studied how partisan media consumption affects attitudes toward addiction policies. They found that stigma mediates the relationship between media consumption and policy support: people who frequently consume conservative media tend to develop stronger stigma toward people with opioid-use disorder, making them more likely to oppose harm-reduction measures such as naloxone distribution or supervised consumption sites. Meanwhile, individuals who consume more liberal media express lower stigma and stronger support for treatment-oriented policies. This demonstrates how the media’s influence is indirect—by shaping stigma, it also shapes public reaction and policy preferences.

Harm-Reduction Activists and Messaging Strategies

Harm-reduction advocates also participate in claims-making by crafting messages designed to reduce stigma and shift public understanding. White and colleagues interviewed fifteen U.S. harm-reduction advocates and found that data alone rarely persuades the public; instead, effective messaging must align with the values of the intended audience. For example, advocates emphasize community safety and reduced strain on emergency systems when speaking to law enforcement, while highlighting compassion and saving lives when speaking to families or faith groups.

The same study found that advocates frame harm reduction as part of a broader community solution, not merely a set of drug-related interventions. This framing encourages audiences to understand addiction as a shared social issue rather than an individual moral failing. By reshaping narratives around addiction, activists help counteract stigma and increase support for evidence-based policies such as syringe-service programs and medication-assisted treatment.

These communication strategies show that activists participate directly in defining addiction for the public. Their work complements the influence of the media by offering alternative narratives centered on health, safety, and community responsibility.

Stigma, Public Reaction, and Policy Development

Media framing and activist messaging together shape stigma, which then affects public reaction and policymaking. Strong stigma—reinforced by criminalizing or moralizing portrayals—reduces support for treatment-oriented policies and increases support for punitive approaches. Kresovich and colleagues found that stigma is the emotional mechanism that translates media exposure into policy attitudes: when stigma is high, support for evidence-based measures drops; when stigma is low, support increases.

Van Draanen and Erickson’s findings show that changes in media language can shift policymaker rhetoric, leading to more nuanced understandings of addiction and more willingness to consider structural explanations.³ Similarly, Netherland and Hansen demonstrate that when media portray addiction as a medical or social issue rather than as crime, public support grows for treatment and harm-reduction responses.

Through these processes, media and activist claims-making shape the entire trajectory of social responses to prescription drug addiction—from public understanding to political decisions and institutional outcomes.

Prescription drug addiction becomes understood as a social problem not only because of rising overdose rates but also because media and activists construct narratives about what addiction means and how society should respond. Media coverage has often emphasized crime and individual responsibility, reinforcing stigma and punitive approaches, while activists work to shift public narratives toward compassion, structural explanations, and evidence-based interventions. Together, these claims-making efforts influence stigma, public reaction, and policy development, revealing how the earliest stages of social-problem construction can shape long-term responses to addiction.

== Commonly abused drug categories ==
=== Opioid analgesics ===
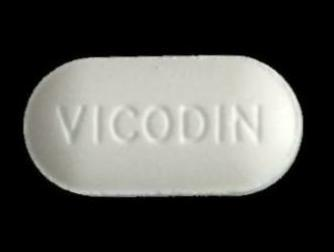
Vicodin is a hydrocodone-containing analgesic.

Opioid painkillers exert CNS depressant effects by binding to opioid receptors. Its psychoactive properties potentially cause euphoria. Changes in the pain management including more liberal opioids prescription for chronic pain conditions, prescription of higher doses and the development of more potent opioid drugs play an important role contributing to the current epidemic of prescription opioid addiction. Examples of opioid drugs include morphine, codeine, oxycodone, hydrocodone, fentanyl, tramadol and methadone.

=== Stimulants ===
Stimulants are drugs that increase alertness and attention. This class of drugs have been frequently prescribed for patients with attention deficit hyperactivity disorder (ADHD) in many countries. In addition to taking higher doses of medication than prescribed, stimulant users may also combine prescribed stimulants with illicit drugs or alcohol in order to induce euphoria. Examples of prescribed stimulants include amphetamine, dextroamphetamine, methamphetamine and methylphenidate.

=== Anxiolytic sedative-hypnotics ===
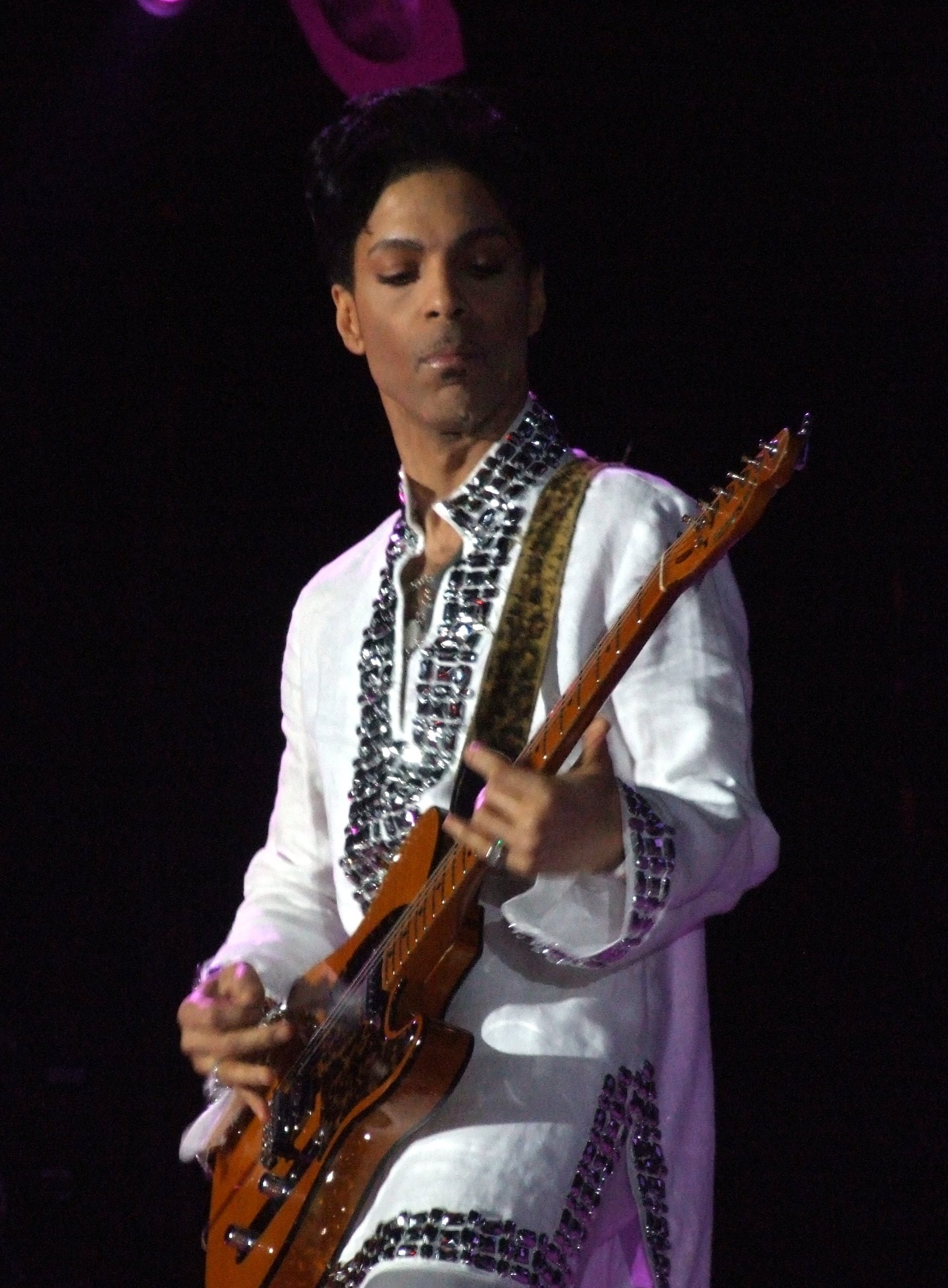
The singer Prince was a frequent user of painkillers and died of an overdose of fentanyl.

Sedatives have potent, dose-dependent CNS depressant effects. These drugs exert a calming effect and may also induce sleepiness. Sedative-hypnotic medications are commonly prescribed for anti-anxiety or sleeping aid purposes.

A major class of sedative-hypnotics causing addiction is benzodiazepines, which includes alprazolam, diazepam, clonazepam and lorazepam.

== Consequences ==
Prescription drug addiction is usually associated with both medical and social consequences.

=== Medical consequences ===
Different drug classes have different side effects. Long-term medical conditions induced by opioid include infection, hyperalgesia, opioid-induced bowel syndrome, opioid-related leukoencephalopathy and opioid amnestic syndrome. Misuse of prescribed opioids medications is associated with increased morbidity and mortality.

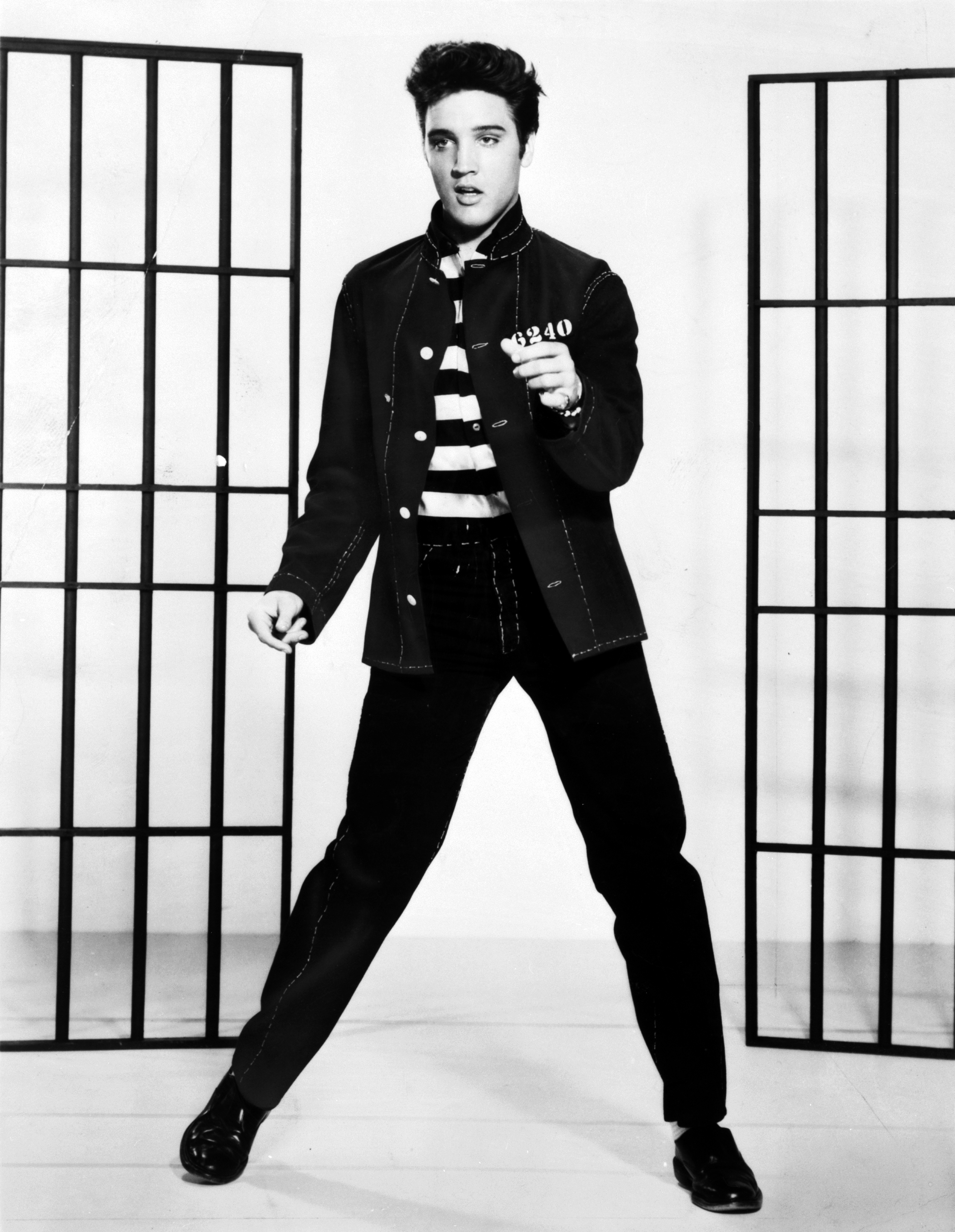
Elvis Presley, a famous American singer, died from a long-term addiction to a combination of depression drugs.

Syndromes of overdose of stimulants may include tremor, confusion, hallucinations, anxiety and seizures.

Inappropriate use of prescribed benzodiazepines may induce nystagmus, stupor or coma, altered mental status (most commonly depression) and respiratory depression.

=== Social consequences ===
Addiction to prescription drugs also brings social impacts. Due to the CNS effect caused by misuse of medications, people are more likely to have poor judgement and thus engaging in risky behaviors. Polydrug addiction with illegal or recreational drugs is also common. It was found that adolescents with opioid addiction show higher rates of past-year criminal behaviors. The risk of motor vehicle accidents may increase if consciousness is greatly reduced. Addiction may also deteriorate academic or work performance and worsen relationships.

== Diagnosis ==
=== Signs and symptoms ===
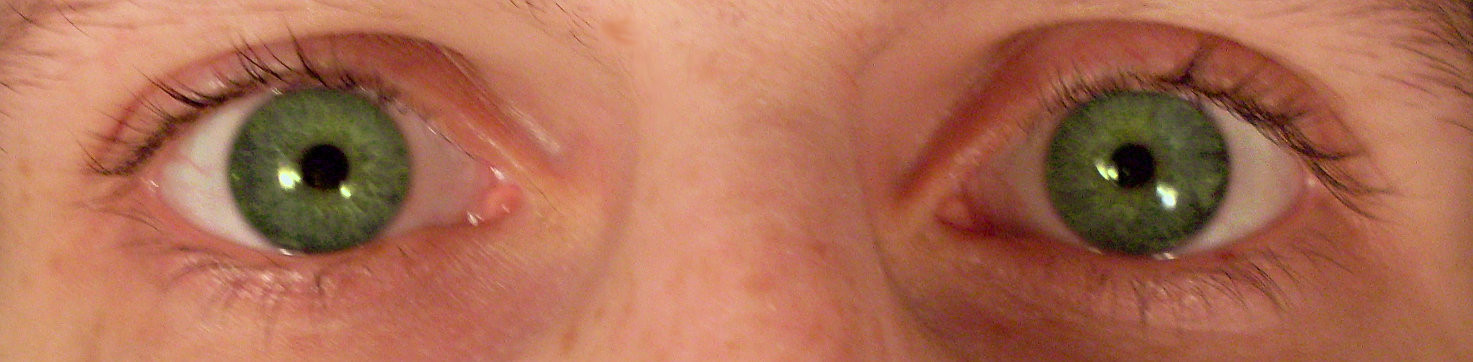
Myosis is a symptom of opiate use.

The signs and symptoms of opioids addiction include decreased body temperature and blood pressure, constipation, decreased sex drive, euphoria and others. Conversely, people with addiction to stimulants often have increased blood pressure, heart rate, body temperature, decreased sleep and appetite. Stimulants may cause anxiety and paranoia as well. Addiction of benzodiazepines is diagnosed based on the withdrawal syndrome occurred after termination of regular use. Benzodiazepine withdrawal symptoms are similar to anxiety, including insomnia, excitability, restlessness, panic attacks and so on.

=== Screening and testing ===
Screening tools with high validity are available to assess patients' risk for opioid misuse, which include rapid opioid dependence screen (RODS), Severity of Dependence Scale (SDS) and OWLS.

There is a standardized list of diagnostic criteria provided by the Diagnostic and Statistical Manual of Mental Disorders for patients with positive screening results. Additionally, urine drug testing can be an accurate method to measure specific biomarkers after metabolism.

== Treatment ==
=== Pharmacotherapies ===
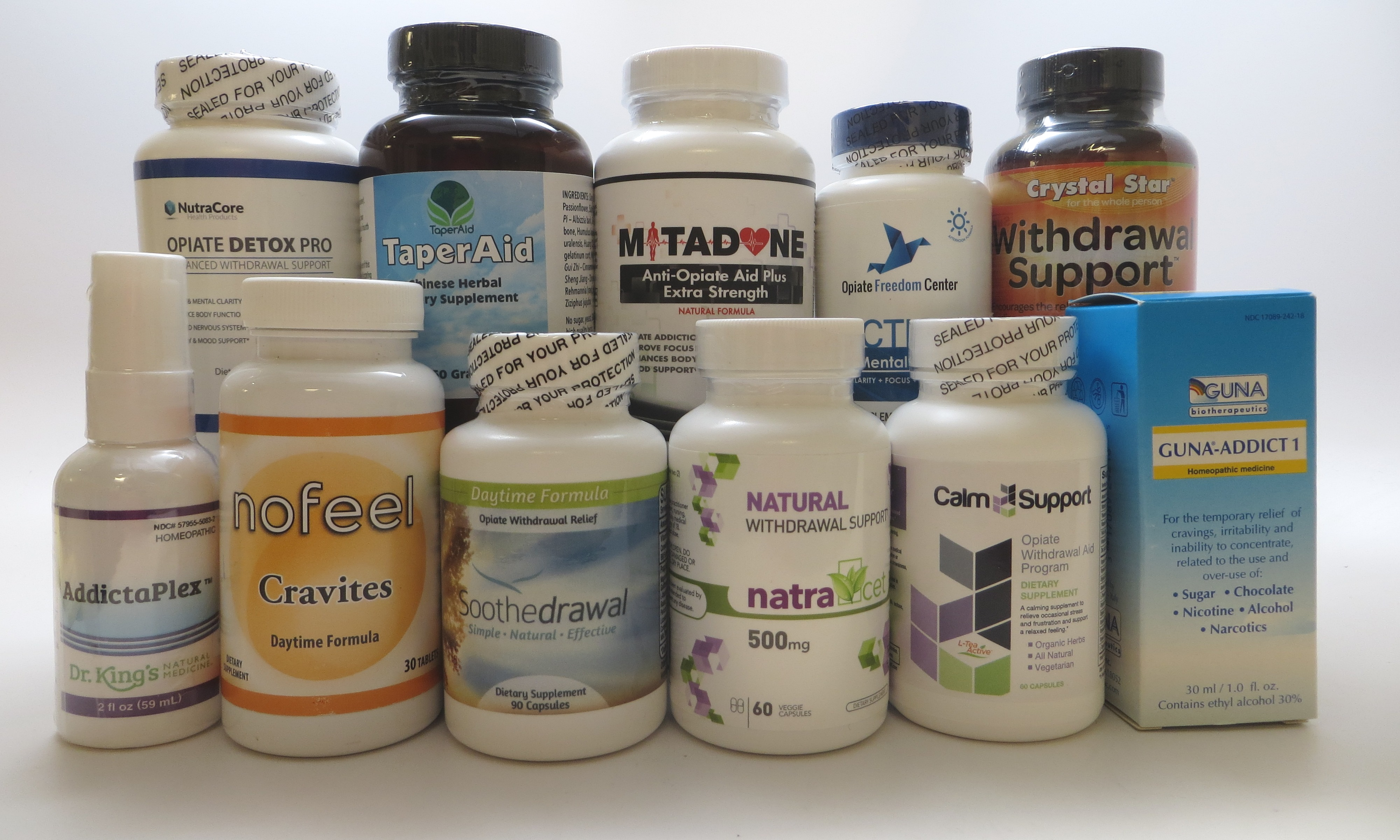
Various opioid cessation products discovered by the US FDA to make false and illegal claims

When a chronic prescription drug user suddenly ceases the use of an addictive drug, the person may experience unpleasant withdrawal symptoms depending on the drug type. A constant opioid user may experience withdrawal symptoms such as nausea and diarrhea. Detoxification is a procedure which treats addicts in withdrawal with low doses of a synthetic opiate drug which helps reduce the severity of their withdrawal symptoms. This type of pharmacotherapy with an opioid agonist or antagonist is adopted widely, together with adjunct psychotherapy to prevent relapse. Examples of medications include methadone, naltrexone and clonidine.

Currently, no FDA-approved medications are available for stimulants addiction. However, some agents including bupropion, naltrexone and mirtazapine have demonstrated positive effects in treating addiction to amphetamine-type stimulants. Acetylcholinesterase inhibitors have shown to be a potential treatment target.

Notably, benzodiazepines addiction often occurs as a result of polydrug abuse, most commonly with opioids. Medically supervised detoxification remains the first-line treatment for benzodiazepines addiction. The use of other medication to aid withdrawal has not been well-developed.

=== Behavioral therapies ===
Cognitive behavioral therapy and the Matrix model are treatment options for stimulant addicts that have been shown to be effective in preventing relapse, despite that patients addicted to opioid may not respond well to behavioral therapy.

== Prevention ==
Patients, healthcare providers, the government, pharmaceutical companies and a variety of stakeholders can contribute to the prevention of prescription drug misuse and its subsequent addiction.

=== Regulations regarding drug prescription ===
In addition to existing controlled substance scheduling systems, mandatory prescriber registration, education and training, many governments launched various initiatives and regulations to minimize misuse of prescription drugs.

For example, many healthcare providers are legally required to participate in local prescription-drug monitoring programs (PDMPs) to record patient drug use. Nationwide PDMPS are effective in reducing abuse and diversion of prescription medications, and promote safer prescribing practices for patients. PDMPs are effective against doctor shopping and incidents of over-prescription.

Furthermore, different regions established specialized agencies to oversee drug addiction and its related regulations. The European Monitoring Centre for Drugs and Drug Addiction (EMCDDA) and the French public interest group OFDT were established in 1993 to provide information concerning drug addiction and consequences. Similarly, the US government founded the National Institute on Drug Abuse (NIDA) directed toward reducing drug misuse and overdose in 1974. In 2016, the Centers for Disease Control and Prevention (CDC) published its CDC Guideline for Prescribing Opioids for Chronic Pain.

=== Screening for addiction ===
Addiction disorders affect 20 to 50 percent of hospitalized patients; therefore physicians must integrate basic screening questions into all histories and physical examinations. Some major evidence-based assessment tools include the Addictions Neuroclinical Assessment, the National Institute on Drug Use Screening Tool, the CRAFFT 2.0 questionnaire, and the Drug Abuse Screening Test (DAST-10).

There are many programs to assist addictive individuals in achieving abstinence. In countries like Brazil, the US and India, addictive patients may be referred to 12-step programs such as Alcoholic Anonymous, Narcotics Anonymous, and Pills Anonymous.

=== Optimize alternative treatments ===
Safer, non-controlled and non-addictive medications serve as an alternative to controlled substances. For example, abuse-deterrent formulations (ADF) are drug formulations that lower a drug's addictiveness and/or prevent misuse by snorting or injection. ADFs have shown to decrease the illicit value of drugs and effectively eradicate substance addiction.

Non-pharmacologic treatments with self-management strategies are highly recommended, such as behavioral treatments, relaxation techniques, physical therapy and psychotherapy.

=== Ensuring drug compliance ===
Pharmacists improve drug compliance by counselling patients on medication instructions, along with educating patients about potential side effects related to medications. Nevertheless, healthcare practitioners are responsible for recognizing problematic patterns in prescription drug use. They may also use prescription-drug monitoring programs (PDMPs) to track drug prescription and dispensing patterns in patients.

Patient-wise, some organizations have suggested ways to use prescription drugs properly. For example, the NIDA guideline recommends patients to:

- following the directions as explained on the label or by the pharmacist
- being aware of potential interactions with other drugs as well as alcohol
- never stopping or changing a dosing regimen without first discussing it with the doctor
- never using another person's prescription and never giving their prescription medications to others
- storing prescription stimulants, sedatives, and opioids safely.

Additionally, the U.S. Food and Drug Administration (FDA) provides a guideline for proper disposal of unused or expired medications.

== Epidemiology ==
Non-medical use of prescription opioids has been documented in many countries, most notably in West and North Africa, the Near and Middle East, and North America.

=== United States ===
In 2005, the US National Survey on Drug Use and Health (NSDUH) demonstrated that 6.4 million people aged 12 or older had used prescription drugs for non-medical reasons during the past month, including pain relievers, tranquillizers and stimulants.

From 2006 to 2016, the total weight of stimulants prescribed in the US nearly doubled; however, the trend of prescription stimulant misuse has been gradually declining since 2017.

In 2017, it was estimated that approximately 76 million adults in the US were prescribed with opioid drugs in the previous year, with 12 percent of them reporting prescription opioid misuse between 2016 and 2017. An estimate of more than 1 million Americans misused prescription stimulants, 2 million misused prescription analgesics, 1.5 million misused tranquillizers, and 271,000 misused sedatives for the first time within the past year.

=== United Kingdom ===
In the United Kingdom, deaths from Tramadol (a synthetic opioid painkiller) overdose have risen to 240 per annum as of 2014.

=== Europe ===
In Europe, methadone is the most widely prescribed opioid substitution medication, accounting for about 63 percent of substitution clients, followed by 35 percent of clients treated with buprenorphine-based medications. An average of 6 percent of students from the EU and Norway reported lifetime use of sedatives or tranquillizers without a doctor's prescription. In 2019, there was an increasing trend of prescription opioid addiction among Europe. Both amphetamines and methamphetamines are stimulant drugs commonly used in Europe, though amphetamines were more frequently prescribed. Methamphetamine use has traditionally been limited to the Czech Republic and Slovakia, although there were signs of increase in other European countries.

=== Asia ===
In comparison to the West, Asia-Pacific has a scarcity of data on prescription drug abuse. Still, the United Nations Office on Drugs and Crime stated that prescription drug abuse is a growing epidemic among recreational drug users in South Asia. Although relevant studies in China were limited, they revealed a similar prevalence of prescription drug misuse among adolescents and young adults, which was 5.9 percent and 25.9 percent, respectively. Most Asian studies, including those from Japan, Thailand, and Singapore, revealed the existence of prescription drug misuse in Asia, but their prevalence rates were found to be lower than that reported in Western developed countries. In 2019, there was an increasing trend of prescription opioid addiction in India.

=== South Africa ===
In comparison to the US, the prevalence of illicit drug use (including prescription drugs) in South Africa is relatively low. Prescription drug and over-the-counter (OTC) drug abuse together constitutes 2.6 percent of all primary illicit substances admitted to South African drug treatment facilities. However, lifetime illicit drug use for prescription or OTC medicines was highest among adolescents, at 16 percent prevalence rate, followed by inhalants, club drugs and others.

== See also ==
- Prescription drug
- Drug addiction
- Drug overdose
- Controlled Substances Act
- Harm reduction
- Polysubstance abuse
- Responsible drug use
- Drug policy
- Pharmacy (shop)
- Regulation of therapeutic goods
