= Lively, Texas =

- Unincorporated community
- Location within Texas Location within the United States
- Coordinates: 32°24′36″N 96°19′24″W
- Country: United States
- State: Texas
- County: Kaufman
- Elevation: 430 ft (130 m)
- Time zone: UTC-6 (Central (CST))
  - Summer (DST): UTC-5 (CDT)
- GNIS feature ID: 1378591

Lively is an unincorporated community in Kaufman County, Texas.

The community derives its name from lively dance socials.

Lively consists of mostly flat land and farms.

Lively is close to Cedar Creek Reservoir, and Route 175.
