= Bill Koch (businessman) =

American businessman and sailor

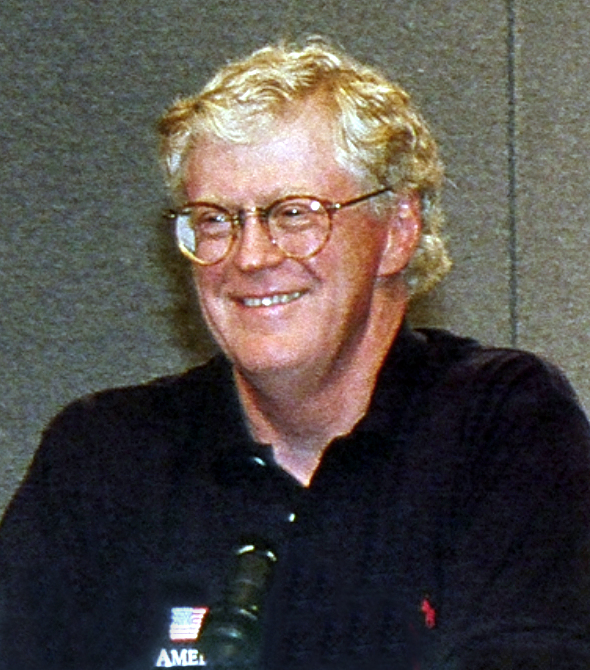
- Koch in 1992
- Born: William Ingraham Koch; May 3, 1940 (age 86); Wichita, Kansas, U.S.
- Education: Massachusetts Institute of Technology (BS, MS, PhD)
- Occupations: Businessman, sailor, and collector
- Spouses: Joan Granlund (m. 1994, divorced); Angela Browder Gauntt (m. 1996; div. 2000); Bridget Rooney (m. 2005)
- Children: 5
- Parents: Fred C. Koch; Mary Robinson
- Relatives: Frederick R. Koch (brother); Charles Koch (brother); David Koch (twin brother)

William Ingraham Koch (/koʊk/ KOHK; born May 3, 1940) is an American billionaire businessman, sailor, and collector. His boat was the winner of the America's Cup in 1992. Forbes estimated Koch's net worth at $1.8 billion in 2019, from oil and other investments.

== Early life and education ==
Koch attended Culver Military Academy in Culver, Indiana. He graduated with bachelor's, master's, and doctoral degrees in chemical engineering, all from the Massachusetts Institute of Technology. David Koch (1940–2019) was his twin brother. His other brothers are Frederick R. Koch (1933–2020) and Charles Koch (born 1935).

== Business career ==
Koch worked in his family's company. He and his eldest brother Frederick R. Koch had inherited Koch Industries stock. In 1980, after an unsuccessful attempt to take over the company from Charles, William was fired from the company. In 1983 the stock netted Frederick and William $800 million in a sale to their brothers, Charles and David.

Legal disputes against Charles and David lasted some two decades. Bill and his eldest brother, Frederick, sided with J. Howard Marshall III, J. Howard Marshall II's eldest son, against Charles and David at one point, in order to take over the company. In 2001, Koch reached a settlement where he had charged the company was taking oil from federal and Indian land. This settlement ended all litigation between the brothers. CBS News reported that Koch Industries settled for $25 million, and Bill received one-third of the settlement for bringing the suit.

After leaving Koch Industries, he became the founder and president of the Oxbow Group, an energy development holding company based in West Palm Beach, Florida. In 2011, Oxbow donated $750,000 to Restore Our Future, Inc., the "SuperPAC" supporting Mitt Romney's presidential campaign. In October 2016, Charles Middleton brought an IRS whistleblower complaint against Oxbow Carbon LLC for avoidance of taxes involving profits from selling petroleum coke, a residue from oil refining.

Koch co-chairs the Alliance to Protect Nantucket Sound, a group formed to fight the Cape Wind project to build an offshore wind farm of 130 turbines. In 2005, Koch contributed $500,000 in donations to the alliance directly and more than $1 million toward lobbyist efforts to defeat the project.

== America's Cup ==
Koch won the America's Cup in 1992 with the yacht America^{3}, defeating the Italian challenger Il Moro di Venezia. America 3's overall record, including trials, was 28–10. Koch reportedly spent around $65 million on his effort and though an amateur, sailed on the crew himself, assisted by veteran sailors like Buddy Melges.

In 1995, Koch financed another team to compete for the cup. This time the crew consisted entirely of women except for tactician David Dellenbaugh, on a yacht named Mighty Mary. However, the boat lost to Dennis Conner's Stars & Stripes in the trials.

Koch was inducted into the America's Cup Hall of Fame in 1993. Koch was inducted into the National Sailing Hall of Fame in 2018.

== Collector ==
Koch is a collector of art and wine. He has filed several high-profile suits against sellers of counterfeit wines, most notably a suit against Hardy Rodenstock for the sale of wine purported to have been owned by Thomas Jefferson. Koch also sued Rudy Kurniawan and the auction house Acker, Merrall & Condit, through whom Koch purchased Kurniawan's wine. Koch filed the suit against Renee Angove in 2009 and was reported to have reached a settlement for $3 million in July 2014.

Koch's collection of maritime memorabilia includes model ships, antique nautical instruments, and paintings of ships and seascapes. A 2005 show at the Museum of Fine Arts in Boston featured his collections, including the America 3 and the yacht it defeated, Il Moro di Venezia. The show was also criticized, however, for glamorizing Koch at the expense of the museum's educational function. Koch had helped finance the show, including paying the cost to move the boats from Rhode Island.

The boats were in Rhode Island because Koch had placed them with a small maritime museum there. Despite the considerable expense of building them, he said "they have absolutely no value" once their racing life is over. Koch, a native of Wichita, Kansas, donated the yacht he used in qualifying for the America's Cup races, Jayhawk, to the Wichita Boathouse. He also supplied money for the city to use in repairing the yacht.

In June 2011, he purchased a 130-year-old photo of the legendary outlaw Billy the Kid for the amount of $2.3 million at a Denver auction.

At his Colorado ranch, Koch has a collection of military vehicles, including an M42 Duster anti-aircraft gun.

In January 2026 his collection of Western art was auctioned at Christies and amounted $ 84,000,000.

== Activism ==
Koch donated "about $5 million" to Alliance to Protect Nantucket Sound.

Koch gave $2 million to Restore Our Future, a PAC created to support 2012 Republican Party Presidential candidate Mitt Romney.

== Personal life ==
In 1994, Koch married Joan Granlund, with whom he had a son, Wyatt. The marriage ended in divorce.

In 1995, he filed a lawsuit against his former lover, Catherine de Castelbajac, to evict her from his $2.5 million condominium at the Four Seasons Hotel in Boston. He said he had allowed her to move in the previous year so she could attend Simmons College, as he seldom used the apartment. When he tried to end the relationship, de Castelbajac refused to move out and claimed he had broken his promises to her. A jury ruled in Koch's favor after a trial that was noted for its disclosure of torrid letters and faxes between the two.

In 1996, he had a daughter with his girlfriend Marie Beard. Later that year, he married Angela Gauntt, with whom he had two children. They divorced in 2000.

In 2005, Koch married Bridget Rooney (b. 1962) at a ceremony in Colorado. The couple has one daughter, Kaitlin. Bridget Rooney Koch is the granddaughter of the original owner of the Pittsburgh Steelers football franchise, Art Rooney (1901–1988). The Kochs are part-time residents of Palm Beach, Florida.

In September 2021 Koch was inducted into the Sons of the American Revolution under Patriot William Burnett (b. 1730 d. 1791) who served as Surgeon General, Chief Physician of the Army's Eastern Department and of the hospital in New Jersey as well as a New Jersey Delegate to the First Continental Congress.
