= Koch, Inc. =

American conglomerate corporation

Coordinates: 37.7511°N 97.2874°W

- Type: Private
- Industry: Conglomerate
- Founded: February 8, 1940; 86 years ago
- Founder: Fred C. Koch
- Headquarters: Wichita, Kansas, U.S.
- Area served: Worldwide
- Key people: Charles Koch (chairman & co-CEO); Dave Robertson (co-CEO & vice chairman); Jim Hannan (president & COO)
- Products: Asphalt, chemicals, raw materials trading, energy, fibers, fertilizers, finance, minerals, natural gas, plastics, petroleum, pulp and paper, ranching
- Revenue: US$125 billion (2021)
- Owner: Charles Koch (42%); Heirs of David Koch (42%); Family trusts of Elaine, Preston, and Pierce Marshall Jr. (16%)
- Number of employees: 120,000 (2022)
- Subsidiaries: Georgia-Pacific; Guardian Industries; Flint Hills Resources; Invista; Molex; Koch Engineering Solutions; Infor; Matador Cattle Company
- Website: www.kochinc.com

Koch, Inc. (/koʊk/) is an American multinational conglomerate corporation based in Wichita, Kansas, and is the second-largest privately held company in the United States, after Cargill. Its subsidiaries are involved in the manufacturing, refining, and distribution of petroleum, chemicals, energy, fiber, intermediates and polymers, minerals, fertilizer, pulp and paper, chemical technology equipment, cloud computing, finance, raw materials trading, and investments. Koch owns Flint Hills Resources, Georgia-Pacific, Guardian Industries, Infor, Invista, KBX, Koch Ag & Energy Solutions, Koch Engineered Solutions, Koch Investments Group, Koch Minerals & Trading, and Molex. The firm employs 122,000 people in 60 countries, with about half of its business in the United States.

The company was founded by its namesake, Fred C. Koch, in 1940 after he developed an innovative crude oil refining process. Fred C. Koch died in 1967 and his majority interest in the company was split amongst his four sons. In June 1983, after a bitter legal and boardroom battle over the amount of dividends paid by the company, the stakes of Frederick R. Koch and William "Bill" Koch were bought out for $1.1 billion and Charles Koch and David Koch became majority owners in the company. Charles owns 42% of the company; trusts for the benefit of Elaine Tettemer Marshall (the daughter in-law of J. Howard Marshall) and Elaine's children, Preston Marshall and E. Pierce Marshall Jr., own 16% of the company. David Koch died on August 23, 2019, and his heirs own the remaining 42% balance of the corporation.

Charles Koch has stated that the company would go public "over my dead body" and that the company has used its freedom from the pressures of public markets to make long-term investments and concentrate on growth.

== History ==
=== Predecessor companies ===
In 1925, Fred C. Koch joined MIT classmate Lewis E. Winkler at an engineering firm in Wichita, Kansas, which was renamed the Winkler-Koch Engineering Company. In 1927, they developed a more efficient thermal cracking process for turning crude oil into gasoline. This process, which the company sold to many independent refineries in the United States, threatened the competitive advantage of established oil companies, which sued for patent infringement. Temporarily forced out of business in the United States, they turned to other markets, including the Soviet Union, where Winkler-Koch built 15 cracking units between 1929 and 1932. During this time, Koch came to despise communism and Joseph Stalin's regime. In his 1960 book, A Business Man Looks at Communism, Koch wrote that he found the USSR to be "a land of hunger, misery, and terror". According to Charles Koch, "Virtually every engineer he worked with [there] was purged."

In the 1930s Winkler-Koch built refineries in nine different countries across hundreds of projects. In 1933 when several American companies were doing business in Germany, in a joint venture with William Rhodes Davis, Koch assisted in the design and construction of the third-largest oil refinery in Germany at the time. It was also one of the few refineries capable of refining fuel for airplanes, and was later a strategic bombing target for Allied forces when World War II broke out. The project was stalled for some time as Davis sought approval, which was granted by the Nazi government. The war commenced six years after the refinery was completed. Koch’s business, and the Koch family, supported the American war effort against Adolf Hitler and his government.

In 1940, Koch joined new partners to create the Wood River Oil and Refining Company. In 1946, the firm acquired the Rock Island refinery and crude oil gathering system near Duncan, Oklahoma. Wood River was later renamed the Rock Island Oil & Refining Company. Charles Koch joined Rock Island in 1961, having started his career at the management consulting firm Arthur D. Little. He became president in 1966 and chairman at age 32, upon his father's death the following year.

=== Koch Industries ===
Wood River Oil and Refining Company was renamed Koch Industries in 1968 in honor of Fred Koch, the year after his death. At that time, it was primarily an engineering firm with a 35% interest in Great Northern Oil Company, which owned the Pine Bend Refinery in Minnesota, a crude oil-gathering system in Oklahoma, and some cattle ranches.

In 1968, Charles approached Union Oil of California about buying its 40% interest in Great Northern Oil Company but the discussions quickly stalled after Union asked for a large premium. In 1969, Koch merged his interest with the 15% interest owned by J. Howard Marshall, then owning a combined 50% of the company, preventing Union from assembling a controlling interest. They then acquired Union's interest. The Pine Bend Refinery produced chemicals, fibers, polymers, asphalt and other commodities such as petroleum coke and sulfur.

In 1970, Charles was joined at the family firm by his brother David Koch. Having started as a technical services manager, David became president of Koch Engineering in 1979.

In 1979, the company acquired 780 dealerships from Chrysler.

In June 1983, after a bitter legal and boardroom battle over the amount of dividends paid by the company, in a settlement, the stakes of William "Bill" Koch and Frederick R. Koch, who wanted the company to pay more dividends rather than reinvest in the business, were bought out for $620 million and $400 million, respectively, and Charles Koch and David Koch became majority owners in the company. In June 1985, William and Frederick sued their brothers claiming that they were underpaid for their stakes, but the suit was dismissed for lack of merit.

In September 2001, the company acquired KoSa. This company is considered the largest producer of polyester in the world.

In 2005, the company acquired Georgia-Pacific, one of the world's largest timber, forest products and paper companies.

In 2008, the company discovered that the French affiliate Koch-Glitsch had violated bribery laws allegedly securing contracts in Algeria, Egypt, India, Morocco, Nigeria and Saudi Arabia after an investigation by Ethics Compliance officer, Egorova-Farines. After Koch Industries' investigative team looked into her findings, the four employees involved were terminated. According to journalist Jennifer Rubin, Koch Industries' general counsel stated that Egorova-Farines failed to promptly share the findings, choosing instead to give the information to a manager at Koch-Glitsch who was later fired for bribery. According to Koch Industries' general counsel, "Egorova-Farines was not fired but instead ran into performance problems, left the company to go on leave and never returned." Egorova-Farines sued Koch-Glitsch for wrongful termination in France, lost, and "was ordered to pay costs for bringing a frivolous case".

In 2010, the company was among the first group of nearly 2,000 employers that applied for and were granted federal reimbursements from the U.S. Department of Health and Human Services, under the new Early Retiree Reinsurance Program established by the Patient Protection and Affordable Care Act, for providing health insurance to retirees too young to be eligible for Medicare.

In 2013, the company acquired Molex, a provider of electronic components, for $7.2 billion.

In September 2014, along with the private equity arm of Goldman Sachs, the company acquired Flint Group, a printing ink producer, for $3 billion.

In June 2014, the United Negro College Fund announced a $25 million grant from Koch Industries and the Charles Koch Foundation to go towards merit-based scholarships and general support of historically black colleges and universities.

In December 2014, the company acquired Oplink Communications, an optical networking device maker, for $445 million.

In 2015, the company joined the "Ban the Box" movement by removing questions about prior criminal convictions from its job application, making it easier for ex-offenders to find work.

In November 2015, the company "signed a Statement of Support with Employer Support of the Guard and Reserve (ESGR) that pledges Koch will provide supervisors with the tools to hire and support employees serving in the National Guard of the United States".

From 2017 to 2021, the company was featured in the Forbes' list of America's Best Employers by State.

In November 2017, Koch Disruptive Technologies was established, the corporation's venture arm, led by Chase Koch, son of Charles Koch.

In July 2019, the company sold its leases in the Athabasca oil sands.

In December 2021, Rupert Murdoch and his wife, Jerry Hall, acquired a 340,000 acres (1,400 km^{2}) ranch in Beaverhead County, Montana, from Matador Cattle Company, a subsidiary of the company, for $200 million. Matador was formed in 1951 by Fred Koch. It won the 2010 Lone Star Land Steward Award. The company also owns ranches in Kansas and Texas that are being marketed for sale.

In March 2023, Koch Industries announced a leadership restructuring wherein Charles Koch will remain chairman and serve as co-CEO alongside Dave Robertson, who will serve as vice chairman of the board. Jim Hannan was named President and COO. Chase Koch and Richard Dinkel were both named executive Vice President while maintaining their other roles. In addition, Ray Geoffroy and Mark Luetters were named senior vice presidents.

In 2024, the company announced a name change to Koch, Inc. to reflect its broadening scope.

== Subsidiaries ==
=== Infor ===
Koch invested $2 billion in Infor, which focuses on cloud computing, in November 2016, another $1.5 billion in January 2019, and acquired the remainder of the company in April 2020 in a $13 billion transaction.

=== Arteva Europe S.a.r.l. ===
Arteva Europe is an "internal bank" which is headquartered in Luxembourg and manages the European cash flows of Koch Industries.

=== Flint Hills Resources LP ===
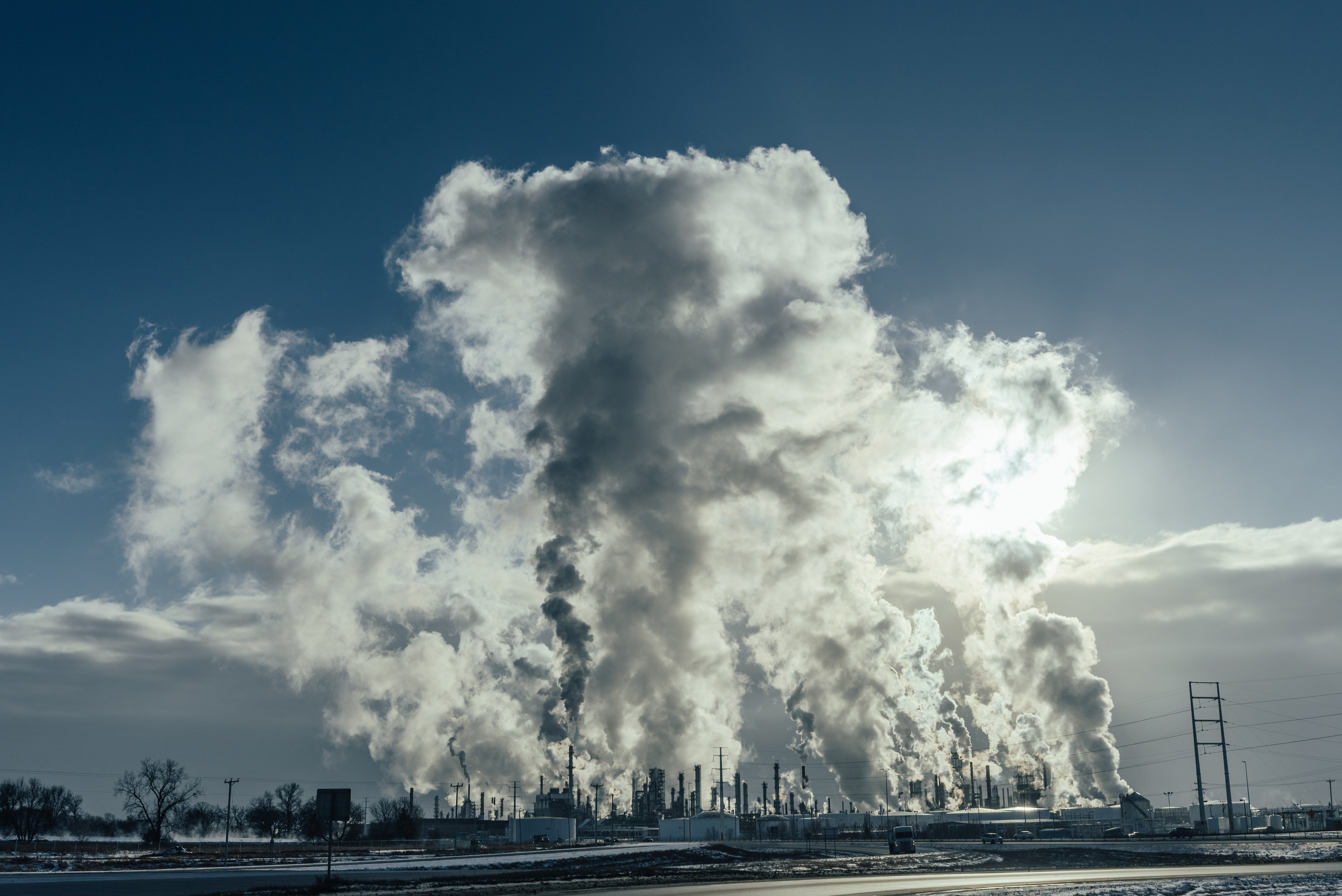
Plumes of steam rise above the Pine Bend oil refinery in Rosemount, Minnesota, run by Flint Hills Resources, a subsidiary of Koch Industries.

Flint Hills Resources LP (FHR), originally called Koch Petroleum Group, is a refining and chemicals company based in Wichita, Kansas. It sells gasoline, diesel, jet fuel, ethanol, polymers, intermediate chemicals, base oils and asphalt. It operates oil refineries in six states and chemical plants in Illinois, Texas and Michigan. The firm also manufactures asphalt used for paving and roofing applications at 13 asphalt terminals in six states including Alaska (2 terminals), Wisconsin (2), Iowa (3), Minnesota (4), Nebraska (1), and North Dakota (1). The firm manages the purchasing of domestic crude oil from Texas and Colorado offices, has five ethanol plants across Iowa and one in Nebraska, has a refinery terminal in Alaska, and operates refineries in Alaska, Texas, and Minnesota.

The Pine Bend Refinery in Minnesota can process 392,000 barrels (62,300 m^{3}) of crude oil per day, most of which comes from Alberta, Canada. It handles one quarter of all Canadian oil sands crude entering the U.S. It also operates 4 fuel terminals in Wisconsin, 6 in Texas, and one each in Iowa and Minnesota.

In 1981, it acquired a petroleum refinery in Corpus Christi, Texas, from Sunoco for $265 million.

In 1994, it acquired a 104,000 b/d petroleum refinery in Corpus Christi, Texas, from Kerr-McGee.

On July 16, 2014, Flint Hills Resources acquired PetroLogistics, a Houston-based manufacturer of chemical and polymer grade propylene.

==== Koch Pipeline Company LP ====
Koch Pipeline Company LP, a division of Flint Hills, owns and operates 4,000 miles (6,400 km) of pipeline used to transport petroleum, natural gas liquids, and chemicals. Its pipelines are located in Wisconsin, Minnesota, Texas, Missouri, Iowa, Oklahoma, Louisiana, and Alberta, Canada. The firm has offices in Wichita, Kansas, St. Paul, Minnesota, Corpus Christi, Texas, and Port Arthur, Texas.

In 1946, Wood River Oil Co. (a precursor company to Koch Industries) purchased Rock Island Oil and Refining Co. As a part of the transaction, it acquired a crude-oil pipeline in Oklahoma. As a result of construction and investments, Wood River acquired other pipelines in the US and Canada.

In 1992, it acquired United Gas Pipeline Co., owner of 9,271 miles of pipelines.

It owns the largest interest in the Colonial Pipeline.

=== Georgia-Pacific ===
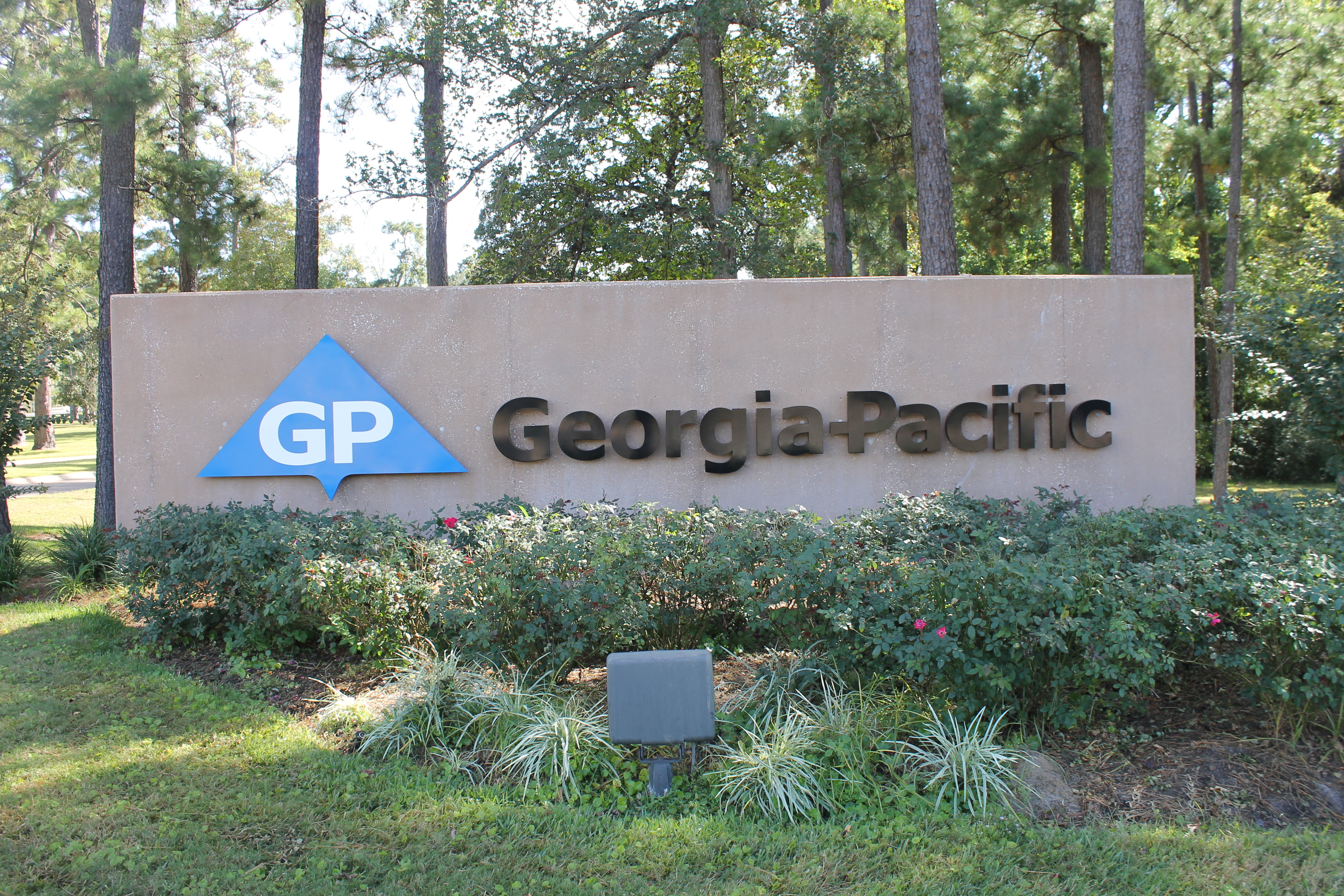
Signage at a Georgia-Pacific site

Georgia-Pacific (Georgia-Pacific LLC, aka: "GP") is one of America's largest forest products companies, specializing in pulp and paper and building materials (largely made from GP's own timber), based in Atlanta, Georgia.

GP is one of the America's largest manufacturers and distributors of tissue, pulp, paper, toilet and paper towel dispensers, packaging, building products and related chemicals, and other forest products.

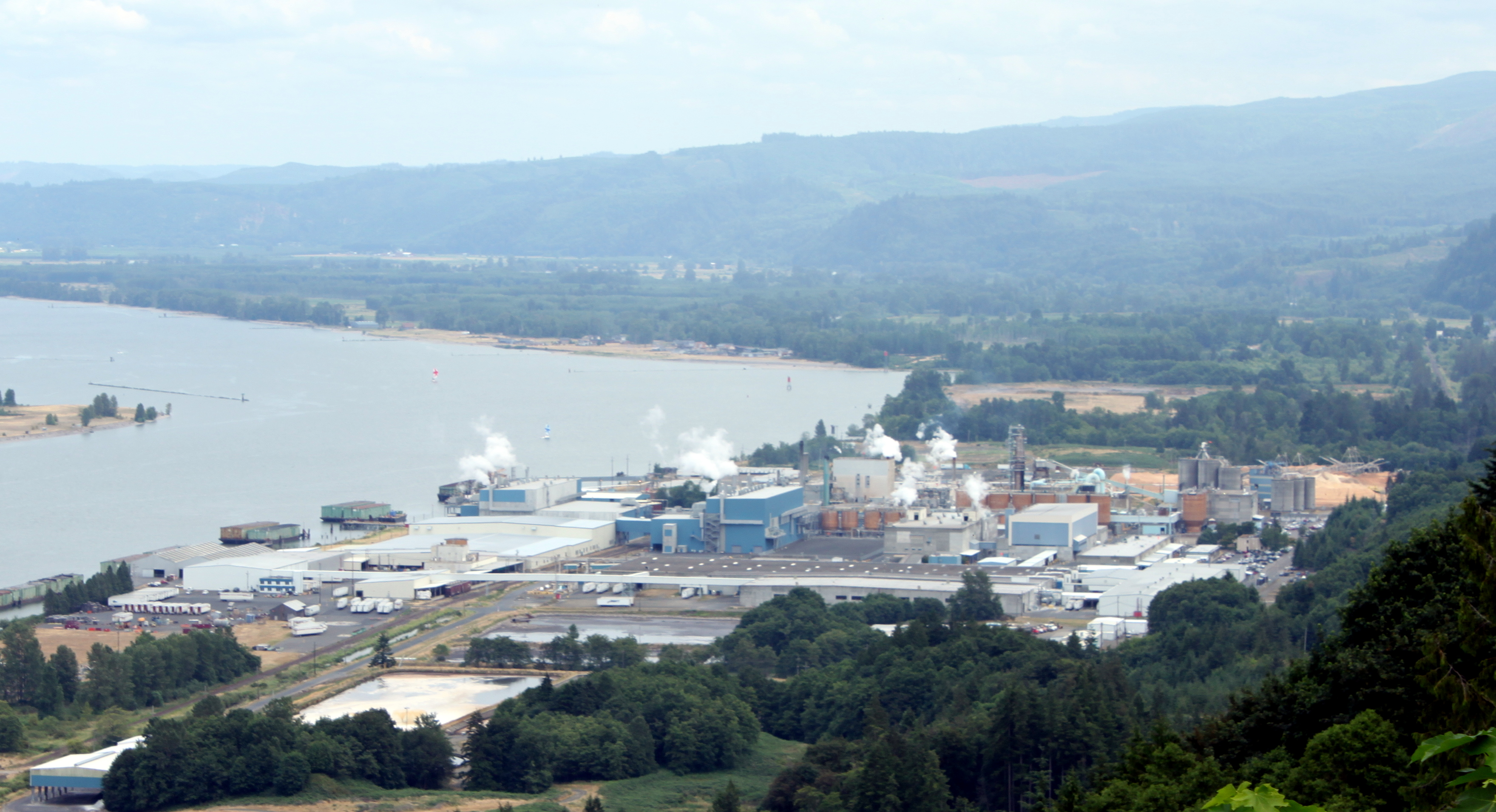
Georgia-Pacific paper mill in Wauna, Oregon from Bradley State Scenic Viewpoint

GP manufactures a wide variety of household products under the brand names Brawny, Angel Soft, Mardi Gras, Quilted Northern, Dixie, Sparkle, and Vanity Fair. The Atlanta-based company has operations in 27 states.

In 2005, after having already acquired parts of GP, Koch Industries began full acquisition of GP, which has since been an independently operated and managed Koch subsidiary.

=== Guardian Industries ===
Guardian Industries is an industrial manufacturer of glass, automotive, and building products based in Auburn Hills, Michigan. The company manufactures float glass, and fabricated glass products for commercial, residential and automotive applications. The company employs more than 18,000 people and has present activities in North and South America, Europe, Asia, Africa and the Middle East.

=== Invista ===
Acquired from DuPont, Invista is a polymer and fibers company that makes "Stainmaster" carpet products, amongst many others.

When the $4.4 billion deal was announced in 2003, Koch planned to make Invista a part of KoSa, its polyester business, which Koch became owner of as of November 14, 2001, after buying the 50 percent stake owned by IMASAB S.A. of Mexico.

The "Lycra" fiber brand was sold to Shandong Ruyi Investment Holding in 2019.

=== Koch Ag & Energy Solutions ===
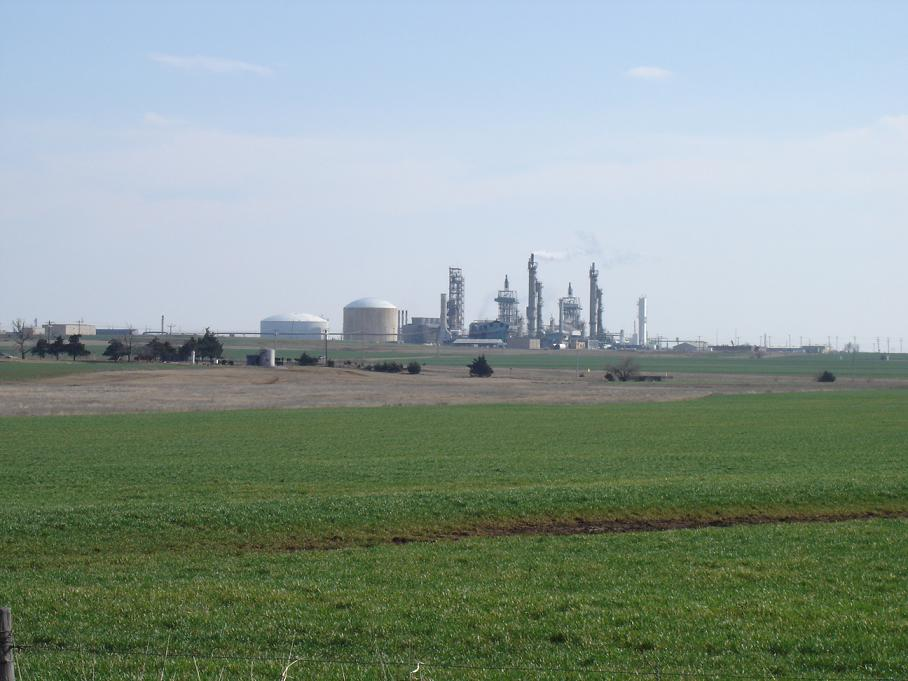
Koch Fertilizer plant in Enid, Oklahoma, US

Koch Ag & Energy Solutions, LLC and its subsidiaries, including Koch Fertilizer, LLC, Koch Agronomic Services, LLC, Koch Energy Services, LLC and Koch Methanol, LLC, globally provide products including fertilizer and other plant nutrients for agricultural turf and ornamental plant markets, as well as other enhanced efficiency products and technology for the energy and chemical markets.

Koch Fertilizer, LLC, is one of the world's largest makers of nitrogen fertilizers. Koch Fertilizer owns or has interests in fertilizer plants in the United States, Canada, Trinidad and Tobago, Venezuela, and Italy, among others.

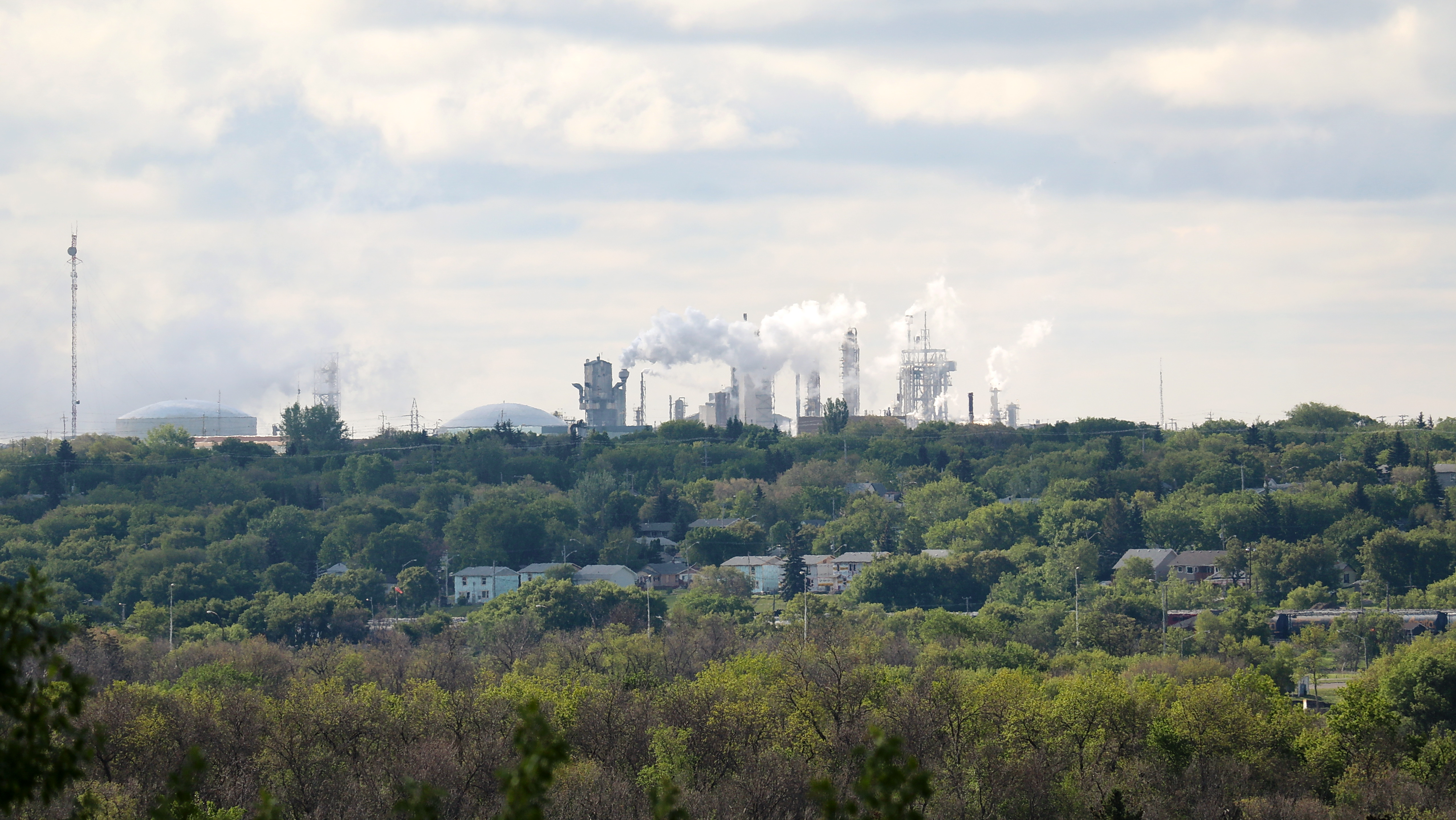
Koch Fertilizer, Richmond Ave, Brandon, Manitoba, Canada

Koch Fertilizer was formed in 1988 when the Koch companies purchased the Gulf Central Pipeline and ammonia terminals connected to the pipeline. The next year, the Koch Nitrogen Company was formed in order to market ammonia. The next few years saw purchases of various ammonia facilities in Louisiana, Canada, and elsewhere, and ammonia sales agreements with firms in Australia, the UK, and other countries. The year 2010 saw the founding of Koch Methanol, LLC, and Koch Agronomic Services, LLC. In October 2010, a plant in which Koch had a 35% stake was nationalized by the Venezuelan government.

In 2011, the firm acquired the British fertilizer firm J&H Bunn Limited. Koch Fertilizer has changed its name to Koch Ag and Energy Solutions (KAES).

=== Koch Chemical Technology Group ===
Koch Chemical Technology Group, Ltd. and its subsidiaries design, manufacture, install and service process and pollution control equipment, water purification and desalination equipment, and provide engineering services for various industrial applications and municipalities around the world.

=== Koch-Glitsch ===
Koch-Glitsch is an entity of Koch, Inc. Koch-Glitsch engineers mass transfer and mist elimination equipment for refineries and chemical plants around the world. As world leaders in process systems, Koch-Glitsch has two joint ventures under its umbrella: The Eta Process Plant and Koch Modular Process Systems.

Eta is the leading supplier of deaeration plants around the world, with over 400 plants worldwide. The majority of seawater deaeration plants supplied by Eta use vacuum stripping.

Koch Modular Process Systems specializes in modular mass transfer systems. Typical applications for these systems include chemical purification, solvent recovery, and liquid-liquid extraction. Koch Modular Process Systems also runs a state-of-the-art pilot plant.

=== Koch Minerals ===
Koch Minerals, LLC through its subsidiaries, is one of the world's largest managers of dry-bulk commodities and is also involved in oil and gas exploration and production, the production of oil field products, investments in steel and other markets.

=== Koch Supply & Trading ===
Koch Supply & Trading companies around the world trade crude oil, refined petroleum products, gas liquids, natural gas, liquefied natural gas, power, renewables, emissions, and metals.

=== Molex ===
Molex produces pin-and-socket Molex connectors, specialized connectors and sensors for equipment used in data transmission, telecommunication, industrial technology, solar power, automotive, aerospace and defense, health technology, and solid-state lighting.

== Environmental and safety record ==
Bloomberg reports that from 1999 to 2003, Koch, Inc. was assessed "more than $400 million in fines, penalties and judgements". The eight instances mentioned by Bloomberg include:

- In October 1994, a pipeline broke and discharged over 90,000 gallons of crude oil into Gum Hollow Creek, in Refugio County, Texas. Heavy rains carried the oil to the Nueces River and on into Nueces and Corpus Christi Bays. The discharge oiled terrestrial and aquatic wildlife. The criminal case was settled in March 2000.
- In 1996, an 8-inch-diameter steel LPG pipeline operated by Koch Pipeline Company ruptured near Lively, Texas, and began leaking butane gas. The vapor cloud ignited when two teenaged residents drove their pickup truck across a creek near the pipeline while on their way to a neighbor's house to call 9-1-1 and report the smell of gas. The two were killed in the explosion, and approximately 25 families were later evacuated from the neighborhood without injury. An investigation conducted by the NTSB found that the pipe section which failed had not been shown to have excessive corrosion in a 1995 inspection. In 1999, a Texas jury found that negligence had led to the rupture of the Koch pipeline and awarded the victims' families $296 million.
- In March 1999, Koch Petroleum Group acknowledged that it had negligently discharged hundreds of thousands of gallons of aviation fuel into wetlands from its refinery in Rosemount, Minnesota, and that it had illegally dumped a million gallons of high-ammonia wastewater onto the ground and into the Mississippi River. Koch Petroleum paid a $6 million fine and $2 million in remediation costs and was ordered to serve three years of probation.
- In 2000, as a result of 312 oil spills attributed to Koch and its subsidiaries across six states, Koch paid what was at the time the largest civil fine ever imposed on a company under any federal environmental law. Koch disputed the EPA figures, saying the EPA did not file claims in over half of the cases, and that "Many of these alleged spills are not even listed in the EPA's own oil spill data base." In a settlement with the U.S. Justice Department and the state of Texas the company agreed to pay a "$30 million civil penalty, improve its leak-prevention programs and spend $5 million on environmental projects".
- In September 2000, a federal grand jury returned a 97-count indictment against Koch Industries and four individual employees for alleged violations of the Clean Air Act and benzene emissions from a Corpus Christi, Texas, plant. In April 2001, Koch pleaded guilty to one count, regarding improper self-reporting related to wastewater. Koch Industries was fined $20 million.
- In December 2000, Koch Petroleum settled with the Justice Department and EPA by agreeing to spend $80 million on up-to-date pollution-control equipment at two refineries in Corpus Christi, Texas and one near St. Paul, Minnesota, and agreed to pay a $4.5 million penalty.
- In June 2003, the US Commerce Department settled with Flint Hills Resources for 40 violations of improper exporting of crude petroleum from the US to Canada for a civil penalty of $200,000.

According to the 2016 documentary, Company Town, improper waste disposal by a Georgia-Pacific mill in Crossett, Arkansas, caused a cluster of cancer incidents in the area around the mill.

In 2006, a Flint Hills Resources refinery in North Pole, Alaska was fined $16,000 by the EPA for 10 separate violations and was required to spend another $60,000 on safety equipment.

Workers at Georgia-Pacific, a corporate subsidiary of Koch, Inc., have claimed that they have developed mesothelioma caused by asbestos in Georgia-Pacific products.

Daniel Indiviglio in The Atlantic argues that the Bloomberg article is misleading, and that there are far more than only eight violations over the 63 years of the company's operation.

Koch, Inc. won the 2015 Conservation Education Award from the Wildlife Habitat Council and "has partnered with the company on conservation efforts for the past 15 years".

== Political activity ==
Fred C. Koch was a founder of the anti-communist John Birch Society in 1958. His son, Charles Koch, who has been co-owner, chairman, and chief executive officer of Koch, Inc., co-founded the Cato Institute. The company also funds the political action committee KochPAC.

According to OpenSecrets, many of Koch, Inc.'s contributions have gone toward achieving legislation on taxes, energy and nuclear power, defense appropriations and financial regulatory reform. Koch Industries has been criticized by the environmentalist group Greenpeace for the role the company played in affecting climate change policy in the United States.

Prior to 2008, a Canadian subsidiary of Koch, Inc. contributed to the Fraser Institute, a conservative Canadian public policy think tank, according to the Institute's founder.

The company has opposed the regulation of financial derivatives, limits on greenhouse gases, and sponsors free market foundations and causes. Koch, Inc. has also come out against Low Carbon Fuel Standards.

According to the watchdog group Documented, in 2020 Koch, Inc. contributed $375,000 to the Rule of Law Defense Fund, a fund-raising arm of the Republican Attorneys General Association.

As of August 2026, the organization spent $35 million in support of Republican candidates in the 2026 United States elections.

== See also ==
- Energy in the United States
- Koch family
- Koch family foundations
- List of largest companies by revenue
- Petrochemical industry
- Petroleum in the United States
