= List of wealthiest Americans by net worth =

This is a list of the wealthiest Americans ranked by net worth. It is based on an annual assessment of wealth and assets by Forbes and by data from the Bloomberg Billionaires Index.

The Forbes 400 Richest Americans list has been published annually since 1982. The combined net worth of the 2020 class of the 400 richest Americans was $3.2 trillion, up from $2.7 trillion in 2017. As of April 2025, there were 902 billionaires in the United States.

== Top 25 richest Americans ==
According to Forbes, as of December 2025, the 25 wealthiest people in the United States are as follows:

25 wealthiest people in the United States as of December 2025
Rank	2024 rank	Name	Net worth. Billions US$	Source of wealth	Age
1	1	Elon Musk	428	Tesla, SpaceX	54
2 ▲	4	Larry Ellison	276	Oracle	81
3	3	Mark Zuckerberg	253	Meta	41
4 ▼	2	Jeff Bezos	241	Amazon	61
5 ▲	6	Larry Page	179	Alphabet	52
6 ▲	7	Sergey Brin	166	Alphabet	52
7 ▲	8	Steve Ballmer	153	Microsoft	69
8 ▲	11	Jensen Huang	151	Nvidia	62
9 ▼	5	Warren Buffett	150	Berkshire Hathaway	95
10 ▲	12	Michael Dell	129	Dell	60
11 ▲	14	Rob Walton & family	118	Walmart	80
12 ▲	13	Jim Walton & family	115	Walmart	77
13 ▼	10	Michael Bloomberg	109	Bloomberg L.P.	83
14 ▼	9	Bill Gates	107	Microsoft	68
15	15	Alice Walton	106	Walmart	75
16	16	Julia Koch & family	81.2	Koch Industries	63
17	17	Charles Koch & family	73.8	Koch Industries	89
18 ▲	23	Thomas Peterffy	73.3	Interactive Brokers	80
19 ▼	18	Jeff Yass	65.7	Susquehanna International Group, TikTok	67
20 ▲	21	Stephen A. Schwarzman	51.9	Blackstone Group	78
21 ▲	22	Ken Griffin	50.4	Citadel LLC	56
22 ▼	19	Jacqueline Mars	42.2	Mars	85
22 ▼	19	John Mars	42.2	Mars	89
24 ▲	25	Lukas Walton	39.8	Walmart	38
25 ▲	NR	Miriam Adelson & family	37.9	Las Vegas Sands	79

== See also ==
- The World's Billionaires
- List of countries by the number of billionaires
