= Koch family =

American family engaged in business

The Koch family (/koʊk/ KOHK) is an American family engaged in business, best known for their political activities in the Koch network and their control of Koch Inc, the 2nd largest privately owned company in the United States (with 2019 revenues of $115 billion). The family business was started in 1940 by Fred C. Koch, who developed a new cracking method for the refinement of heavy crude oil into gasoline. Fred's four sons litigated against each other over their interests in the business during the 1980s and 1990s.

By 2019, Charles Koch and David Koch, commonly referred to as the Koch brothers, were the only two of Fred Koch's four sons still with Koch Industries. Charles and David Koch built a political network of libertarian and conservative donors, and the brothers funneled financial revenue into television and multi-media advertising. David Koch died in August 2019.

== Family members ==
- Fred C. Koch (1900–1967), American chemical engineer and entrepreneur who founded the oil refinery firm that later became Koch Industries and was one of the founding members of the John Birch Society.
- Mary Robinson Koch (1907–1990), wife of Fred C. and eponym of the company's namesake tanker vessel Mary R. Koch
- Four sons of Fred C. and Mary Robinson Koch:
  - Frederick R. Koch (1933–2020), collector
  - Charles Koch (born 1935), chairman of the board and chief executive officer of Koch Industries
    - Chase Koch (born 1977), president of Koch Disruptive Technologies
    - Elizabeth Koch (born 1976), publisher and writer
  - David Koch (1940–2019), executive vice president of Koch Industries
    - Julia Koch (born 1962), socialite and wife of David Koch
  - Bill Koch (born 1940), businessman, sailor, and collector

== Non-profit organizations ==
The Koch family foundations are a related group of non-profit organizations that began with the establishment of the Fred and Mary Koch Foundation in 1953, and now includes the Charles Koch Foundation, the David H. Koch Charitable Foundation and the Koch Cultural Trust. The organizations collectively have a stated goal of "advancing liberty and freedom" through the support of various causes which "further social progress and sustainable growth in prosperity". In addition to the direct action of the non-profits, the groups have also contributed financially to other organizations in the fields of research, libertarian solutions to public well-being, arts, and education, including contributions to think-tanks through organizations like the Cato Institute (formerly the Charles Koch Foundation).

== Political activities ==
While Bill Koch has also been active in conservative political causes (particularly opposing the Obama administration's climate change program), it is his brothers Charles and David who have become famous for their activity in American politics, beginning in at least 1980, when David Koch was the vice-presidential nominee for the Libertarian Party. Their political contributions began to attract widespread attention from media outlets in 2008, when, through their family foundations, the brothers contributed to 34 political and policy organizations, three of which they founded, and several of which they directed. They have since organized a network of an estimated 500 libertarian and conservative donors, candidates, think tanks, and other groups. As an example of their influence, investigative journalist Jane Mayer noted House Speaker John Boehner's appeal to David Koch in 2011 when Boehner needed votes to prevent a government shutdown.

The Koch brothers indicated that they intended to raise almost $880 million in support of candidates in the 2016 elections, and have given more than $100 million to conservative and libertarian policy and advocacy groups in the United States, including The Heritage Foundation and the Cato Institute, and more recently Americans for Prosperity.

A focus of their political activities has been the support of think tanks and institutions which deny or downplay man-made climate change or its impact.

Americans for Prosperity, founded by David Koch, has been reported by Kenneth P. Vogel of Politico to be one of the main nonprofit groups assisting the Tea Party movement; but in 2010, Koch spokeswoman Melissa Cohlmia distanced the Kochs from the tea parties and FreedomWorks saying that "no funding has been provided by Koch companies, the Koch foundations, Charles Koch or David Koch specifically to support the tea parties". According to the Koch Family Foundations and Philanthropy website, "the foundations and the individual giving of Koch family members" have financially supported organizations "fostering entrepreneurship, education, human services, at-risk youth, arts and culture, and medical research".

Former Republican congressman Joe Scarborough, co-host of MSNBC's Morning Joe, has pointed out that the Koch brothers have supported more than just what are generally considered conservative causes. They opposed George W. Bush on many issues, are pro-choice, support same sex marriage, and worked closely with the Obama White House for the Obama administration's criminal justice reform initiatives that aligned with their own.

In early 2018, political advocacy groups linked to the Koch family pledged to spend $400 million on the 2018 midterm elections, including $20 million to promote the H.R.1 – An Act to provide for reconciliation pursuant to titles II and V of the concurrent resolution on the budget for fiscal year 2018 to skeptical voters.

== Public policy ==
The Koch family funding apparatus has been funding conservative and libertarian groups through think tanks for over forty years. The Cato Institute, which Charles Koch helped create in 1974, is consistently ranked as among the top 25 U.S. think tanks overall in terms of influence on public policy in the United States. In 2015, the Kochs worked with the American Civil Liberties Union on criminal justice reform, specifically in the realm of civil asset forfeiture. The Kochs have also worked to push legislation aiming to adjust federal sentencing guidelines and reduce prison populations.

According to a report by American University's Investigative Reporting Workshop, the Koch brothers have built "what may be the best funded, multifaceted, public policy, political and educational presence in the nation today". Opposition to the government spending any money on climate change is among this network's activities. Anthropogenic climate change denier Willie Soon received more than $500,000 from the Charles G. Koch Charitable Foundation and a trust used by the Kochs. The primary recipients of Koch contributions, including Americans for Prosperity, The Heritage Foundation, and the Manhattan Institute, actively oppose clean energy and carbon legislation and who reject climate science. In fact, the Koch brothers were involved in the first known gathering of climate change deniers in 1991. Organized by the Cato Institute, the meeting shifted the position of the Republican Party on climate change. While George H. W. Bush had still supported research into global warming under the Global Change Research Act of 1990, acceptance of scientific evidence on climate change began to weaken due to the Koch family's influence.

== See also ==
- Charles Koch Arena
- David H. Koch Institute for Integrative Cancer Research
- David H. Koch Theater
- The Science of Success
- Climate change denial
- Lobbying
