= List of female billionaires =

Forbes magazine annually ranks the world's wealthiest female billionaires. This list uses the static rating published once a year by Forbes, usually in March or April. There were 481 women listed on the world's billionaires as of 10 March 2026, up from 406 in 2025. From 2025 to 2026 Alice Walton remained listed as the world's wealthiest woman.

According to a 2021 billionaire census, women make up 11.9% of the billionaire cohort, and "just over half of all female billionaires are heiresses, with an additional 30% having a combination of inherited and created wealth." In the overall female billionaire cohort, 16.9% of billionaires are self-made and 53.5% gained their wealth through a combination of inheritance and self-made wealth as of 2017.

== 2026 ==
The top 10 women billionaires, using the Forbes static ranking as of 10 March 2026, are:

No.	Name	Image	Birth date	Net worth US$ (billions)	Citizenship	Source	World rank
1	Alice Walton		7 October 1949 (age 77)	▲134	United States	Walmart	
2	Françoise Bettencourt Meyers		10 July 1953 (age 73)	▲100	France	L'Oréal	
3	Julia Koch		12 April 1962 (age 64)	▲81	United States	Koch, Inc.	
▲4	Iris Fontbona		1942 or 1943 (age 83–84)	▲52.6	Chile	Antofagasta	
▼5	Jacqueline Mars		10 October 1939 (age 87)	▲49.1	United States	Mars, Inc.	
▼6	Rafaela Aponte-Diamant		1944 or 1945 (age 81–82)	▲44.5	Italy / Switzerland	Mediterranean Shipping Company	
▼7	Savitri Jindal		20 March 1950 (age 76)	▲39.1	India	Jindal Group	
▲8	Miriam Adelson		10 October 1945 (age 81)	▲37.5	Israel / United States	Las Vegas Sands	
▼9	Abigail Johnson		19 December 1961 (age 64)	▲33.2	United States	Fidelity Investments	
▲10	Zheng Shuliang		1945 or 1946 (age 80–81)	▲33.2	China	Shandong Hongqiao	

== 2025 ==
The top 10 women billionaires, using the Forbes static ranking as of 1 April 2025, are:

No.	Name	Image	Birth date	Net worth US$ (billions)	Citizenship	Source	World rank
▲1	Alice Walton		7 October 1949 (age 77)	▲101	United States	Walmart	▲15
▼2	Françoise Bettencourt Meyers		10 July 1953 (age 73)	▼81.6	France	L'Oréal	▼20
▲3	Julia Koch		12 April 1962 (age 64)	▲74.2	United States	Koch, Inc.	▲21
4	Jacqueline Mars		10 October 1939 (age 87)	▲42.6	United States	Mars, Inc.	▲33
▲5	Rafaela Aponte-Diamant		1944 or 1945 (age 81–82)	▲37.7	Italy / Switzerland	Mediterranean Shipping Company	▲44
6	Savitri Jindal		20 March 1950 (age 76)	▲35.5	India	Jindal Group	▼48
▲7	Abigail Johnson		19 December 1961 (age 64)	▲32.7	United States	Fidelity Investments	▲55
▼8	Miriam Adelson		10 October 1945 (age 81)	▲32.1	Israel / United States	Las Vegas Sands	▼56
▲9	Marilyn Simons		1950 or 1951 (age 75–76)	▲31	United States	Renaissance Technologies	▲57
▲10	Melinda French Gates		15 August 1964 (age 62)	▲30.4	United States	Microsoft	▲58

== 2024 ==
The top 10 women billionaires, using the Forbes static ranking as of 4 April 2024, are:

No.	Name	Image	Birth date	Net worth US$ (billions)	Citizenship	Source	World rank
1	Françoise Bettencourt Meyers		10 July 1953 (age 73)	▲99.5	France	L'Oréal	▼15
▲2	Alice Walton		7 October 1949 (age 77)	▲72.3	United States	Walmart	21
▼3	Julia Koch		12 April 1962 (age 64)	▲64.3	United States	Koch industries	▼23
4	Jacqueline Mars		10 October 1939 (age 87)	▲38.5	United States	Mars, Inc.	▼35
▲5	MacKenzie Scott		7 April 1970 (age 56)	▲35.6	United States	Amazon.com	▲43
▲6	Savitri Jindal		20 March 1950 (age 76)	▲33.5	India	Jindal Group	▲46
▼7	Rafaela Aponte-Diamant		1944 or 1945 (age 81–82)	▲33.1	Italy / Switzerland	Mediterranean Shipping Company	▼48
▼8	Miriam Adelson		10 October 1945 (age 81)	▼32	Israel / United States	Las Vegas Sands	▼53
▼9	Gina Rinehart		9 February 1954 (age 72)	▲30.8	Australia	Hancock Prospecting	▼56
▲10	Abigail Johnson		19 December 1961 (age 64)	▲29	United States	Fidelity Investments	▲58

== 2023 ==
The top 10 women billionaires, using the Forbes static ranking as of 4 April 2023, are:

No.	Name	Image	Birth date	Net worth US$ (billions)	Citizenship	Source	World rank
1	Françoise Bettencourt Meyers		10 July 1953 (age 73)	▲74.8	France	L'Oréal	▲11
▲2	Julia Koch		12 April 1962 (age 64)	▼59	United States	Koch industries	▼17
▼3	Alice Walton		7 October 1949 (age 77)	▼56.7	United States	Walmart	▼21
▲4	Jacqueline Mars		10 October 1939 (age 87)	▲38.3	United States	Mars, Inc.	▲31
▲5	Miriam Adelson		10 October 1945 (age 81)	▲35	Israel / United States	Las Vegas Sands	▲35
▲6	Rafaela Aponte-Diamant		1944 or 1945 (age 81–82)	▲31.2	Italy	Mediterranean Shipping Company	▲43
▲7	Susanne Klatten		28 April 1962 (age 64)	▲27.4	Germany	Altana, BMW	▲51
▼8	Gina Rinehart		9 February 1954 (age 72)	▼27	Australia	Hancock Prospecting	▼52
▼9	MacKenzie Scott		7 April 1970 (age 56)	▼24.4	United States	Amazon.com	▼60
▼10	Iris Fontbona		1942 or 1943 (age 83–84)	▲23.1	Chile	Antofagasta plc	▲65

== 2022 ==
The top 10 women billionaires, using the Forbes static ranking as of 5 April 2022, are:

No.	Name	Image	Birth date	Net worth US$ (billions)	Citizenship	Source	World rank
1	Françoise Bettencourt Meyers		10 July 1953 (age 73)	▲74.8	France	L'Oréal	▼14
2	Alice Walton		7 October 1949 (age 77)	▲65.3	United States	Walmart	▼18
▲3	Julia Koch		12 April 1962 (age 64)	▲60	United States	Koch industries	▲21
▼4	MacKenzie Scott		7 April 1970 (age 56)	▼43.6	United States	Amazon.com	▼30
▲5	Jacqueline Mars		10 October 1939 (age 87)	▲31.7	United States	Mars, Inc.	▲41
▲6	Gina Rinehart		9 February 1954 (age 72)	▲30.2	Australia	Hancock Prospecting	▲46
▼7	Miriam Adelson		10 October 1945 (age 81)	▼27.5	Israel / United States	Las Vegas Sands	▼50
8	Susanne Klatten		28 April 1962 (age 64)	▼24.3	Germany	Altana, BMW	▼56
▲9	Iris Fontbona		1942 or 1943 (age 83–84)	▼22.8	United States	Antofagasta plc	▲67
▲10	Abigail Johnson		19 December 1961 (age 64)	▲21.2	United States	Fidelity Investments	▲75

== 2021 ==
The top 10 women billionaires, using the Forbes static ranking as of 17 March 2021, are:

No.	Name	Image	Birth date	Net worth US$ (billions)	Citizenship	Source	World rank
▲1	Françoise Bettencourt Meyers		10 July 1953 (age 73)	▲73.6	France	L'Oréal	▲12
▼2	Alice Walton		7 October 1949 (age 77)	▼61.8	United States	Walmart	▼17
3	MacKenzie Scott		7 April 1970 (age 56)	▼53	United States	Amazon.com	▼22
4	Julia Koch		12 April 1962 (age 64)	▲46.4	United States	Koch industries	▼27
▲5	Miriam Adelson		10 October 1945 (age 81)	▲38.2	Israel / United States	Las Vegas Sands	▲36
▼6	Jacqueline Mars		10 October 1939 (age 87)	▲31.3	United States	Mars, Inc.	▼48
▼7	Yang Huiyan		20 July 1981 (age 45)	▲29.6	Cyprus	Country Garden Holdings	▼50
▼8	Susanne Klatten		28 April 1962 (age 64)	▲27.7	Germany	Altana, BMW	▲53
▲9	Gina Rinehart		9 February 1954 (age 72)	▲23.6	Australia	Hancock Prospecting	▲70
▲10	Iris Fontbona		1942 or 1943 (age 83–84)	▲23.5	Chile	Antofagasta plc	▲74

== 2020 ==
The top 10 women billionaires, using the Forbes static ranking as of 18 March 2020, are:

No.	Name	Image	Birth date	Net worth US$ (billions)	Citizenship	Source	World rank
▲1	Alice Walton		7 October 1949 (age 77)	▲65.9	United States	Walmart	12
▼2	Françoise Bettencourt Meyers		10 July 1953 (age 73)	▲65.4	France	L'Oréal	13
▲3	MacKenzie Scott		7 April 1970 (age 56)	▲62.3	United States	Amazon	▼17
▲4	Julia Koch		12 April 1962 (age 64)	▲44.9	United States	Koch industries	▲24
▲5	Jacqueline Mars		10 October 1939 (age 87)	▲28.9	United States	Mars, Inc.	▲38
▼6	Yang Huiyan		July 20, 1981 (age 45)	▲27.3	Cyprus	Country Garden Holdings	▼43
▼7	Susanne Klatten		28 April 1962 (age 64)	▲23.9	Germany	Altana, BMW	▼54
▼8	Laurene Powell Jobs		6 November 1963 (age 63)	▲19.9	United States	Apple Inc., The Walt Disney Company	▼67
▲9	Zhong Huijuan		1961 (age 64–65)	▲18.8	China	Hansoh Pharmaceutical	▲70
▼10	Gina Rinehart		9 February 1954 (age 72)	▲16.1	Australia	Hancock Prospecting	▼103

== See also ==
- Forbes list of billionaires
- Forbes' list of The World's 100 Most Powerful Women
- The Giving Pledge
