= Wichita Collegiate School =

Private school in Wichita, Kansas, US

Location
- 9115 East 13th Street; Wichita, Sedgwick County, Kansas 67206; United States; 37.707248°N 97.230978°W

Information
- School type: Private, College preparatory
- Motto: Proba Te Dignum (Prove Yourself Worthy)
- Established: 1963
- CEEB code: 173210
- Head of school: Matthew Carolan
- Grades: Preschool to 12
- Average class size: 15
- Campus size: 42 acres
- Campus type: Suburban
- Colors: Royal Blue; Gold
- Song: Dear Collegiate
- Athletics: Class 3A
- Athletics conference: AVCTL III & IV
- Mascot: Sparty
- Team name: Wichita Collegiate Spartans
- Newspaper: The Spartan Voice
- Yearbook: The Collegian
- Website: www.wcsks.com

Wichita Collegiate School, known locally as Collegiate, is a private, co-educational, non-denominational, and non-profit college preparatory day school founded in 1963 currently enrolling 966 students from preschool through 12th grade located in Wichita, Kansas, United States. The Head of School is Nathan Washer, who was appointed in July 2019. The school motto is: "Proba te Dignum" (Latin for "Prove Yourself Worthy")

== History ==
Wichita Collegiate School was originally conceived in the 1950s as an alternative to Wichita public education. Its name was originally Wichita Independent Day School. The founder and first chairman of Wichita Collegiate, Robert Love, claimed in his book, How to Start Your Own School, that, "Traditional private and parochial schools either eagerly emulate public institutions or are coerced by the state into doing so through acceptance of government accreditation and certification regulations ... Collegiate was independent of both church and state from the beginning for practical reasons. All of us had already rejected state-run schools as being a restrictive, inefficient way to educate children. To be consistent, we decided against any association with the state in our new education venture. This meant no special legislative favors, no participation in government loan or grant programs, no state accreditation, and no requirement that we hire only certified teachers." Robert Love was a member of the National Council of the Libertarian John Birch Society but he parted ways with that organization over its support for the Vietnam War.

=== Contributions ===
In 2008, Wichita Collegiate was selected by the Malone Family Foundation to receive a $2 million endowment to help make the educational opportunities and experiences accessible to academically talented students entering grades 7-12 whose families demonstrate significant financial need.

== Academics ==
Wichita Collegiate School is one of 82 schools that are members of the Independent Schools Association of the Southwest (ISAS) and the only ISAS member in Kansas. Duke University's Talent Identification Program has designated Wichita Collegiate School as a local partner for its gifted program. The Kansas Board of Regents recognizes Wichita Collegiate School courses as meeting its Qualified Admissions requirements. Wichita Collegiate School has regularly taken 1st, 2nd or 3rd place statewide in the Science Olympiad for Kansas Division C small schools over a period of many years, although the program is now discontinued. The Wichita Collegiate School average enrollment is 60 students per graduating class with an average class size of 20 students; 100% of WCS seniors are accepted to college. The mean SAT test score in 2014 was 1828 compared to a national average in 2013 of 1498.

=== Faculty ===
The faculty at Wichita Collegiate School have received many honors. Some recent examples include the selection by The College Board of Science Department Chair Janice Crowley as National AP Teacher of the Year in 2008, and Kansas State Board of Education's official recognition of Wichita Collegiate teacher Jenifer Sinsel, the 2006 National Finalist in science at its July 2007 meeting. Sinsel has since left Collegiate. Sinsel is also the 2007 recipient of the National Science Teachers Association Sylvia Shugrue Award. Sinsel was one of only 20 teachers from throughout the United States to be selected by NASA to be in the first class in the Airspace Systems Education Cohort.

Wichita Collegiate School chemistry teacher Janice Crowley received the Milken Family Foundation Educator Pathfinder Award for leading her students in investigating a carcinogenic source of breast cancer in area fast food restaurants. Crowley also was named in Reader's Digest's "America's 100 Best" and has been designated Regional Outstanding Chemistry Teacher by the American Chemical Society.

== Extracurricular activities ==
=== Athletics ===
Wichita Collegiate School's teams, the Spartans, have numerous state titles. These include four boys' state baseball championships, six boys' state basketball championships, three boys' state football championships, twelve boys' state golf championships and seventeen boys' state tennis championships; as well as one girls' state basketball championship. The girls' tennis team has won seventeen of the state championships in the past eighteen years, missing only the year '99-'00. Collegiate was moved to 4A after winning almost every athletic state championship in 2009, except boys' baseball and girls' basketball, which placed third. They moved back down to 3A ahead of the 2014–2015 season. Girls' Soccer was added to the athletic sports group in the 2013 season.

=== State championships ===
State Championships
Season	Sport	Number of Championships	Year
Fall	Football	3	1994, 2000, 2009
Fall	Volleyball	1	2009
Fall	Tennis, Girls	28	1986, 1987, 1988, 1989, 1990, 1991, 1992, 1993, 1994, 1995, 1996, 1997, 1998, 2000, 2001, 2002, 2003, 2004, 2005, 2009, 2010, 2011, 2012, 2013, 2014, 2015, 2016, 2017
Winter	Basketball, Boys	7	1993, 1996, 2007, 2009, 2010, 2016, 2026
Winter	Basketball, Girls	2	2006, 2010
Spring	Golf, Boys	19	1990, 1992, 1994, 1996, 1998, 1999, 2000, 2001, 2002, 2003, 2006, 2007, 2008, 2009, 2010, 2011, 2013, 2014, 2026
Spring	Baseball	6	1994, 1995, 2000, 2001, 2022, 2023
Spring	Tennis, Boys	26	1989, 1991, 1992, 1993, 1994, 1995, 1996, 1997, 1998, 1999, 2000, 2001, 2002, 2006, 2008, 2009, 2010, 2011, 2012, 2013, 2014, 2016, 2017, 2019, 2021, 2023
Total	91		

== Notable alumni ==
- R. C. Buford, CEO of the San Antonio Spurs
- Tiffany Day, singer and songwriter
- Gradey Dick, professional basketball player for Toronto Raptors
- Maurice Evans, NBA player who played for the Washington Wizards, Atlanta Hawks, Los Angeles Lakers, Orlando Magic, Detroit Pistons, Sacramento Kings, and Minnesota Timberwolves
- Raj Goyle, State Representative and 2010 Democratic candidate for Kansas's 4th congressional district
- Robert Kelker-Kelly, former soap opera actor and current professional aircraft pilot
- Chase Koch, son of Charles Koch and President of Koch Fertilizer, a subsidiary of Koch Industries
- Elizabeth Koch, publisher and member of the Koch Family
- Katie Swan, professional tennis player

== See also ==
- Education in Kansas
- List of high schools in Kansas
- List of unified school districts in Kansas
