= Louise: Amended =

Memoir by Louise Krug

Louis: Amended
- Cover of Louis: Amended
- Author: Louise Krug
- Language: English
- Genre: Memoir
- Publisher: Black Balloon Publishing
- Publication date: April 24, 2012
- Publication place: United States
- Media type: Print (Paperback); Digital (EPUB)
- Pages: 200
- ISBN: 978-1-936-78701-2

Louise: Amended is a memoir by the American author Louise Krug, published on April 24, 2012 by Black Balloon Publishing. Publishers Weekly named it one of the best nonfiction books of 2012, calling it "an immediate, unsparing, and beautifully rendered account of loss and recovery." Author Mary Karr also called it "a page-turner in which a person's very soul deepens before your eyes."

At 22 years old, Kansas-born Krug travelled to California with her French boyfriend to pursue her dream of becoming a celebrity journalist. Weeks after they arrived, she fainted at a Santa Barbara Film Festival premiere, afterward suffering from numbness, headaches, double vision, vertigo and difficulty walking. A doctor later discovered that a cavernous angioma in Krug's brain had burst, causing the symptoms — many of which were irreversible.

In Louise: Amended, Krug recounts her dashed dreams, the details of her condition and the difficulties of her recovery. The book is a combination of traditional memoir interspersed with fictional chapters written from the perspective of her boyfriend, family and friends, examining how personal tragedies affect entire groups of people.
