= Maverick Jetpants in the City of Quality =

2012 novel by Bill Peters

- Cover of Maverick Jetpants in the City of Quality by Bill Peters
- Author: Bill Peters
- Language: English
- Genre: Literary fiction
- Publisher: Black Balloon Publishing
- Publication date: October 9, 2012
- Publication place: United States
- Media type: Print (Paperback); Digital (EPUB)
- Pages: 280
- ISBN: 978-1-936-78702-9

Maverick Jetpants in the City of Quality is a novel by American author Bill Peters, published on October 9, 2012, by Black Balloon Publishing.

== Synopsis ==
Set in Rochester, New York in 1999, Maverick Jetpants in the City of Quality revolves around narrator Nathan Gray coming to terms with adulthood while trying to catch an arsonist who is burning down his hometown. Nate struggles with securing full-time employment and forming meaningful relationships with family and romantic interests as his childhood friend, Necro, grows distant, becoming involved with local Neo-Nazis and possibly being responsible for the mysterious fires.

The story is told from Nate's point of view and in the idiosyncratic language he uses with his friends — a mixture of colloquialisms and inside jokes, which offer insight into the characters' histories, hopes and fears.

== Reception ==
The book was an editor's choice in The New York Times Sunday Book Review, which claimed "... Bill Peters belongs in the ranks of serious literary artists." The book was also praised by Publishers Weekly as "by turns funny and moving ... richly captures life in a decaying American city."
