= Gianluigi Aponte =

Italian businessman (born 1940)

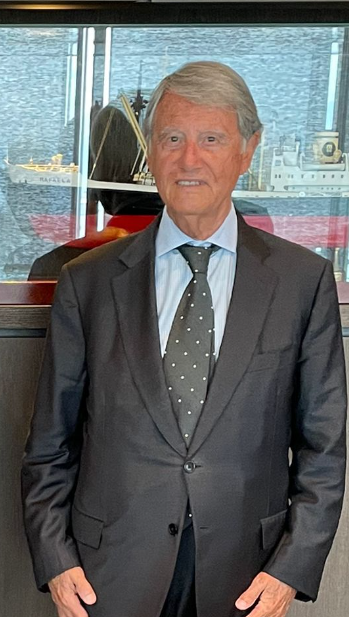
- Aponte in 2022 with a model of MSC's second vessel, MV Rafaela
- Born: 27 June 1940 (age 86); Sant'Agnello, Kingdom of Italy
- Education: Istituto Tecnico Nautico Statale Nino Bixio
- Occupations: Founder, Mediterranean Shipping Company
- Spouse: Rafaela Aponte-Diamant
- Children: 2

Gianluigi Aponte (Italian pronunciation: [dʒanluˈiːdʒi aˈponte]; born 27 June 1940) is an Italian billionaire businessman, and the co-founder, and chairman of Mediterranean Shipping Company (MSC).

In 2026, Forbes estimated Aponte's net worth at $44.5 billion, ranking him as the 43rd-richest person in the world.

== Early life ==
Gianluigi Aponte was born in Sant'Agnello, Italy, on 27 June 1940. His family had long been active in ferry operations on the Bay of Naples, and he trained as a ship's captain.

== Career ==
While overseeing a Naples–Capri ferry in 1960 Aponte met his wife, Rafaela Diamant. He left seafaring to work for several years at the Bank of International Credit, Geneva. In 1970 he and Aponte-Diamant founded MSC with a single vessel, MV Patricia, that shipped cargo between Europe and Africa.

In 1987, after the acquisition of the cruise company Starlauro, a subsidiary cruise line, MSC Crociere, was founded. In 1995, the entrepreneur also acquired the shipping company SNAV, a hydrofoil and ferry company engaged in connections with the main Italian islands.

In 2008, Forbes reported his fortune of $2.8 billion, making him the 412th richest man in the world. In 2009, he became one of the shareholders of CAI-Compagnia Aerea Italiana following the privatisation ordered by the Italian government. In the same year, he left the shareholding structure, selling his stake to the Riva Group.

In October 2010 he acquired 50% of the shares of the shipping company Grandi Navi Veloci to which he contributed three ships and the Naples-Palermo line formerly belonging to SNAV, a company of the MSC group. In November 2011 he acquired 51% share of Bluvacanze and Cisalpina Tour. In July 2015, he bought Caremar.

In 2014, he retired from the position of CEO and president in favour of his son Diego Aponte, assuming the role of executive chairman within MSC.

In April 2025, Aponte was reported to have been personally involved in brokering a $19 billion port deal with Hong Kong tycoon Li Ka-shing.

In April 2026, it was announced that the Aponte family had completed a transfer of ownership of the company from founder Gianluigi Aponte to his two children, Diego Aponte and Alexa Aponte Vago, with Gianluigi Aponte remaining as Executive Chairman.

== Honours ==
In 2009, at the Teatro di San Carlo of Naples, he received, along with Fabio Cannavaro, Ambra Vallo and others, a prize for "Neapolitan Excellence in the World" from then-Italian prime minister Silvio Berlusconi.

In 2012, he won the Cruise International Lifetime Achievement Award in recognition of his long term activity in the industry.

In October 2013, he received Containerisation International's Lifetime Achievement Award, as well as a knighthood, the Order of Merit for Labour, from Italian President Giorgio Napolitano. The Aponte family have featured prominently in the Lloyd's List Top 100 most influential people in the shipping industry, named in the top 10 in 2014 and in position 16 in 2018.

== Personal life ==
He is married to Rafaela Aponte-Diamant, a Swiss woman of Israeli origin, and daughter of a Geneva banker, he met when she was a passenger on a boat of which he was the captain. They have two children, Diego Aponte, who is group president of MSC and was the company's CEO from 2014 until November 2019, and Alexa Aponte Vago, who is CFO of MSC. The Apontes reside in Switzerland.
