= Forbes List =

Forbes List can refer to one of the lists published annually by the American magazine Forbes, including:

- the Forbes 400 list of the wealthiest people in the United States.
- The World's Billionaires, a list of all the people with a net worth over US$1 billion.
- During the Pandemic, as the Global Economy was in turmoil, Forbes created the Forbes NEXT 1000 initiative to shine a light on entrepreneurial heroes. This year-round initiative showcases the ambitious sole proprietors, self-funded shops and pre-revenue startups in every region of the country.
