= Good Profit =

2015 book by Charles G. Koch

Good Profit: How Creating Value for Others Built One of the World's Most Successful Companies
- Author: Charles G. Koch
- Language: English
- Genre: Management
- Publisher: Crown Publishing Group; Piatkus
- Publication date: October 13, 2015
- Pages: 288
- ISBN: 9781101904138

Good Profit: How Creating Value for Others Built One of the World's Most Successful Companies is a 2015 book by Charles G. Koch. It was published in the United States by Crown Business, an imprint of the Crown Publishing Group, a division of Penguin Random House LLC. It was published in the United Kingdom by Piatkus.

It is a follow-up to a 2007 book by Koch called The Science of Success.

== Book summary ==
In the book, Koch explains the business strategy behind the remarkable success of his family-owned firm, Koch Industries, which is the second largest privately owned company in the United States. Koch is the firm's co-owner, CEO, and chairman of the board.

This strategy, or "management framework," is called "Market-Based Management," or "MBM." Koch says that his book is meant for all business readers who desire to move beyond "anecdotes, buzzwords, and laundry lists" to apply MBM methods to generate profit for themselves, their business, and to improve society as a whole.

In explaining MBM, Koch writes that it involves analyzing "business through a win-win mind-set." This strategy, he maintains, has enabled the firm to deal with dramatic geopolitical, economic, and technological changes, and at the same time to earn what he describes as "good profits." By this, he means profits that result from treating customers with respect and placing their values first. By contrast, "bad profit" involves "disrespecting customers by making them subsidize our business with their tax dollars and higher prices, siphoning away the good profit other companies could have earned.”

The book argues, then, for a free market, liberated from the distortions of corporate welfare. Koch calls for the elimination of government "distortions," such as ethanol mandates and import tariffs. Although Koch Industries profits "short term from these market distortions," states Koch, they "don't lead to good profit" and thus "leave virtually everyone worse off long term, including us.”

Koch explains that he has willingly shared MBM principles with other firms and organizations, since he is confident that the success of others will not diminish his own. "On the contrary, MBM is win-win" Koch has stated, revealing his view that there are no zero-sum scenarios.

== Dimensions of Market-Based Management ==
=== Vision ===
Koch underscores that to achieve long-term success a business cannot rely on short-term profits but must accept the necessity of what economist Joseph Schumpeter calls "creative destruction." This means that a firm must innovate at least as quickly as its most effective competitor. Koch also cites Adam Smith's maxim that "Consumption is the sole end and purpose of production; and the interests of the producer ought to be attended to only so far as it may be necessary for promoting that of the consumer." Building on these insights, Koch explains that at the heart of MBM is the understanding that the role of business "is to help people improve their lives by providing products and services they value more highly than their alternatives, and to do so while consuming fewer resources.”

=== Virtue and Talents ===
Koch explains that the most important attribute his firm looks for in potential employees is "good character and compatible values." The company has a list of ten "Guiding Principles," which include integrity, compliance, value creation, humility, and respect. Koch elaborates at length on each of the characteristics he seeks out in job applicants and outlines the process by which his firm seeks to develop good hires into optimal employees. He offers many observations that might surprise some readers, noting, for example, that while some firms favor Ivy League graduates, "Koch has enjoyed much better results hiring from Wichita State or Kansas State than from Harvard.”

=== Knowledge Processes ===
Koch discusses what he calls "disruptive innovation," which involves "creating, acquiring, sharing, and applying knowledge." It is important, he underlines, for a business to be informed immediately about developments occurring all around the world, and to adjust its operations accordingly. He reflects on the advantages and disadvantages of hiring consultants, discusses how to convert information into results, and expands on the insight that "Knowing why something is profitable is often as valuable as knowing what is profitable." He also discusses such procedures as "benchmarking," which involves "identifying, understanding, and adopting superior practices from anywhere in the world.”

=== Decision Rights ===
The fourth dimension of MBM is "decision rights," which, Koch explains, "should reflect an employee's demonstrated comparative advantages." For example, a top salesperson's time should be devoted time to making sales, while analysis of those sales should be left to a technically qualified sales analyst. Such a division of labor, explains Koch, leads to greater value creation. The bestowal of decision rights upon an individual, moreover, should not be predicated upon that individual's position in the corporate hierarchy. Some decisions, Koch further observes, need to be centralized, while a change in circumstances can make it necessary to transfer decision rights from one person, department, or level to another. Koch also outlines his firm's "Decision Making Framework," an eight-step procedure that stresses the importance of using "no more steps or complexity than is necessary to make a sound decision.”

=== Incentives ===
“MBM," writes Koch, "eschews limits on what employees can earn." Providing incentives is important, although he distinguishes between "beneficial incentives and perverse incentives." The former are incentives that "reward creating the most value in society," while the latter "motivate employees to do the wrong things." Beneficial incentives are characteristic of prosperous societies; perverse incentives are found in societies, including Communist societies that suffer from poverty, waste, and corruption.

=== Case studies and conclusion ===
Toward the end of his book, Koch recounts four case studies in MBM from the corporate history of Koch Industries, specifying the ways in which the five dimensions of MBM came into play in each instance. In his conclusion, he stresses the importance of grasping MBM as a "holistic" strategy and lists several mistakes to avoid when implementing MBM.

== Supportive responses ==
In his review of Good Profit for the Financial Times, Ed Crooks described it as "invaluable as a window on the thinking of a hugely important US figure who is uneasy in the public eye."

Reviewing the book in the Wall Street Journal, Joseph Maciariello, professor emeritus of social science and management at Claremont Graduate University, wrote: “C. William Pollard, chief executive emeritus of ServiceMaster, has posed the question: 'Can the business firm make money, create wealth, and also be a moral community for the development of human character and social concern?' In Good Profit, Mr. Koch not only makes a strong argument in the affirmative but also provides a systematic framework—aimed at honing the vision and talent of executives and employees—for how it can be done.”

F.H. Buckley, writing in the American Spectator, suggested that Good Profit was “written for two different kinds of readers”: ambitious entrepreneurs and those who are curious “to know how a company that forswears crony capitalism can thrive, as Koch Industries did." Koch, explained Buckley, believes in "a system of government and of laws that permits people to flourish – a system that clearly defines and protects property rights, that enforces bargains, and that allows people to speak freely." Noting that this view has put Koch "at odds with the progressive Left," Buckley concluded: “We’ve had countless novels and plays about how wealth is built on crime, about the evils of capitalism, from people like F. Scott Fitzgerald and Arthur Miller, people who had not the faintest idea about success in business or in life. How refreshing it is to get the real story!"

In his review of Good Profit for National Review, William Bennett, noting the left's attacks on the Koch brothers, argued that Charles Koch “should be applauded, not vilified,” for he “aims to revive our belief in entrepreneurship, labor, the joys of work, and the ability of a free people to prosper, innovate, and create value for themselves and others.” Bennett pointed out that “Koch’s philosophy is not to maximize short-term profit, but rather to create and sustain value for his customers over time and to do so in an ethical manner.” Good Profit, stated Bennett, “is as much a course in ethics as one in business management, and Koch is a business icon with the soul and inclination of a philosopher” – an icon, moreover, who offers “the uplifting vision of entrepreneurship and work that America needs right now.”

Good Profit has been praised by John Mackey, co-founder and Co-CEO of Whole Foods Market, who said that it "helps show you the way to good profit – whether you work for an international supermarket chain, a medium-sized regional business, or your own start-up." General Richard B. Myers, former Chairman of the Joint Chiefs of Staff, called it "The ultimate 'how to' book on running a successful business.... A must read for those who want to take their enterprise to the next level." John Schnatter, CEO of Papa John's Pizza, called Koch "a genuine patriot" whose "lifelong mission is to make America as strong and free as she can be" and who "believes the principles of economic opportunity that have guided America are worth protecting." Charles R. Schwab described the book as "a clear example of the American dream and how our country benefits when successful entrepreneurs create new jobs (and more taxes for government services) while providing the golden egg for philanthropic efforts."
