= David Koch =

American businessman and philanthropist (1940–2019)

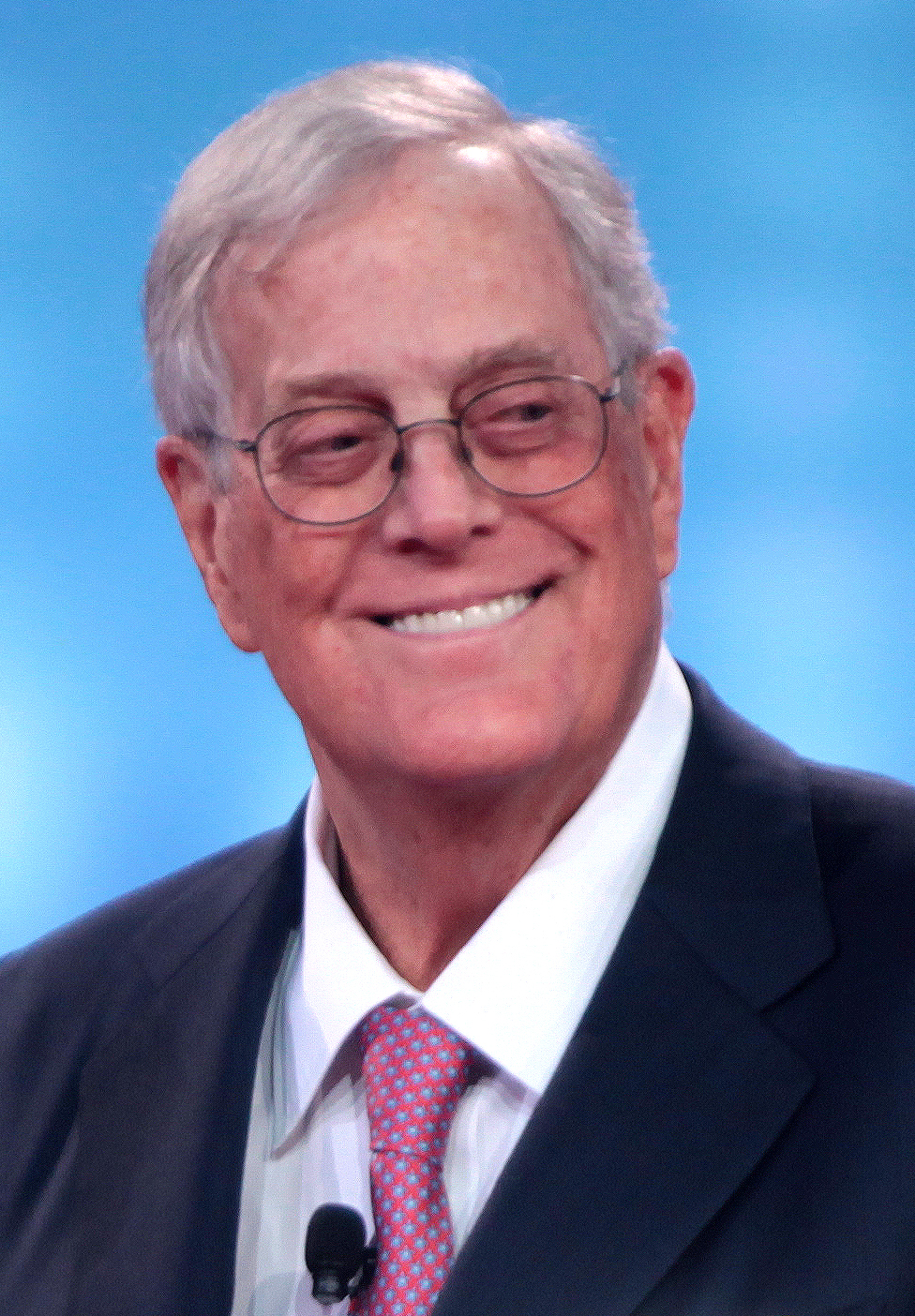
- Koch in 2015
- Born: David Hamilton Koch; May 3, 1940; Wichita, Kansas, U.S.
- Died: August 23, 2019 (aged 79); Southampton, New York, U.S.
- Education: Massachusetts Institute of Technology (BS, MS)
- Known for: Support of libertarian and conservative causes Philanthropy to cultural and medical institutions
- Title: Executive Vice President of Koch Industries
- Political party: Libertarian (before 1984); Republican (1984–2019)
- Board member of: Aspen Institute, Cato Institute, Reason Foundation, Americans for Prosperity Foundation, WGBH, Massachusetts Institute of Technology, Smithsonian National Museum of Natural History, Metropolitan Museum of Art, American Ballet Theatre, Lincoln Center for the Performing Arts, Deerfield Academy, New York–Presbyterian Hospital, Memorial Sloan Kettering Cancer Center, American Museum of Natural History
- Spouse: Julia Flesher (m. 1996)
- Children: 3
- Father: Fred C. Koch
- Relatives: Frederick R. Koch (brother); Charles Koch (brother); Bill Koch (twin brother)

David Hamilton Koch (/koʊk/ KOHK; May 3, 1940 – August 23, 2019) was an American businessman, philanthropist, limited government advocate and chemical engineer. In 1970, he joined the family business: Koch Industries, the second-largest privately held company in the United States. He became president of the subsidiary Koch Engineering in 1979 and became a co-owner of Koch Industries (along with elder brother Charles) in 1983. Koch served as an executive vice president of Koch Industries until he retired due to health issues in 2018.

Koch was a libertarian. He was the 1980 Libertarian candidate for Vice President of the United States and helped finance the campaign. He founded Citizens for a Sound Economy and donated to advocacy groups and political campaigns, the majority of which were Republican. Koch became a Republican in 1984; in 2012, he spent over $100 million in a failed bid to oppose the re-election of President Barack Obama.

As of 2012, Koch was the fourth-richest person in the United States, and as of 2013 the wealthiest resident of New York City. As of June 2019, Koch was ranked as the 11th-richest person in the world (tied with his brother Charles), with a net worth of $50.5 billion. Koch contributed to the Lincoln Center, Sloan Kettering, NewYork–Presbyterian Hospital, and the Dinosaur Wing at the American Museum of Natural History. The New York State Theater at Lincoln Center, home of the New York City Ballet, was renamed the David H. Koch Theater in 2008 following Koch's gift of $100 million for the renovation of the theater.

== Early life and education ==
Koch was born in Wichita, Kansas, the son of Mary Clementine (née Robinson) and Fred Chase Koch, a chemical engineer. David's paternal grandfather, Harry Koch, was a Dutch immigrant who founded the Quanah Tribune-Chief newspaper and was a founding shareholder of the Quanah, Acme and Pacific Railway. David was the third of four sons, with elder brothers Frederick, Charles, and nineteen-minute-younger twin Bill. His maternal ancestors included William Ingraham Kip, an Episcopal bishop; and Elizabeth Clementine Stedman, a writer.

Koch attended the Deerfield Academy prep school in Massachusetts, graduating in 1959. He attended Massachusetts Institute of Technology (MIT), earning both a bachelor's (1962) and a master's degree (1963) in chemical engineering. He was a member of the Beta Theta Pi fraternity. Koch played basketball at MIT, averaging 21 points per game at MIT over three years, a school record. He also held the single-game scoring record of 41 points from 1962 until 2009, when it was eclipsed by Jimmy Bartolotta.

== Role at Koch Industries ==
In 1970, Koch joined Koch Industries under his brother Charles, to work as a technical-services manager. He founded the company's New York City office and in 1979 he became the president of his own division, Koch Engineering, renamed Chemical Technology Group. David's brothers Frederick and Bill had inherited stock in Koch Industries. In June 1983, after a bitter legal and boardroom battle, the stakes of Frederick and Bill were bought out for $1.1 billion and Charles Koch and David Koch became majority owners in the company. Legal disputes against Charles and David lasted roughly two decades. Frederick and Bill sided with J. Howard Marshall III, J. Howard Marshall II's eldest son, against Charles and David at one point, in order to take over the company. In 2001, Bill reached a settlement in a lawsuit where he had charged the company was taking oil from federal and Indian land; that settlement ended all litigation between the brothers. CBS News reported that Koch Industries settled for $25 million.

As of 2010, David Koch owned 42 percent of Koch Industries, as did his brother Charles. He held four U.S. patents. Koch served as an executive vice president of Koch Industries until retiring due to health issues in 2018. His retirement was announced on June 5, 2018.

== Political involvement ==
=== Campaigns ===
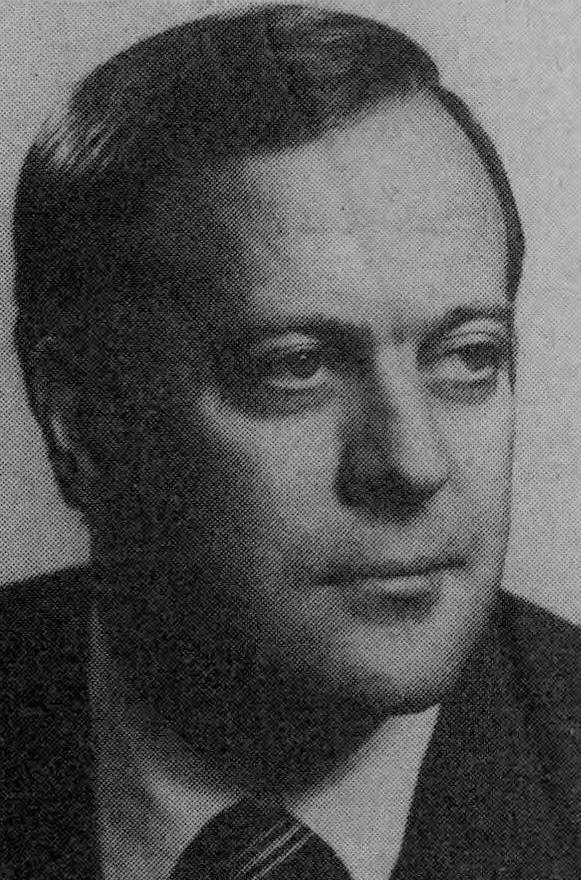
Koch in 1980

Koch was the Libertarian Party's vice-presidential candidate in the 1980 presidential election, sharing the party ticket with presidential candidate Ed Clark. The Clark–Koch ticket proposed downsizing the government through the elimination of various federal laws and departments. These included abolishing Social Security, the Federal Reserve Board, welfare, minimum-wage laws, corporate taxes, all price supports and subsidies for agriculture and business, and U.S. Federal agencies including the SEC, EPA, ICC, FTC, OSHA, FBI, CIA, and DOE. Their platform proposed privatizing all transportation and inland waterways. The ticket received 921,128 votes, 1% of the total nationwide vote. This was the Libertarian Party national ticket's best showing until 2016 in terms of percentage and its best showing in terms of raw votes until the 2012 presidential election, although that number was surpassed again in 2016. "Compared to what [the Libertarians had] gotten before," Charles said, "and where we were as a movement or as a political/ideological point of view, that was pretty remarkable, to get 1 percent of the vote."

After the bid, according to journalist Brian Doherty's Radicals for Capitalism, Koch viewed politicians as "actors playing out a script".

Koch credited the 1976 presidential campaign of Roger MacBride as his inspiration for getting involved in politics:

Here was a great guy, advocating all the things I believed in. He wanted less government and taxes, and was talking about repealing all these victimless crime laws that accumulated on the books. I have friends who smoke pot. I know many homosexuals. It's ridiculous to treat them as criminals — and here was someone running for president, saying just that.

Koch gave his own vice presidential campaign $100,000 a month after being chosen as Ed Clark's running mate. "We'd like to abolish the Federal Election Commission and all the limits on campaign spending anyway," Koch said in 1980. When asked why he ran, he replied: "Lord knows I didn't need a job, but I believe in what the Libertarians are saying. I suppose if they hadn't come along, I could have been a big Republican from Wichita. But hell — everybody from Kansas is a Republican."

In 1984, Koch broke with the Libertarian Party when it supported eliminating all taxes; in a letter to David Bergland, the Libertarian candidate for the 1984 presidential election, Koch referred to Bergland's platform as "extreme", predicting that the country would be thrown into "utter chaos" if it was implemented. Subsequently, Koch shifted the bulk of his financial support to the Republican Party, though he continued to contribute to several Libertarian campaigns in local races. Koch donated to various political campaigns, most of which were Republican. In February 2012, during the Wisconsin gubernatorial recall election, Koch said of Wisconsin governor Scott Walker, "We're helping him, as we should. We've gotten pretty good at this over the years. We've spent a lot of money in Wisconsin. We're going to spend more," and said that by "we" he meant Americans for Prosperity.

In 2012, Koch spent over $100 million in a failed bid to oppose the re-election of President Barack Obama.

=== Views ===
Koch supported policies that promoted smaller government and lower taxes. He was against the Patient Protection and Affordable Care Act and the Dodd–Frank Wall Street Reform and Consumer Protection Act. Koch said he wasn't sure if global warming was anthropogenic, and thought a warmer planet would be "good", with lengthened growing seasons mitigating problems caused by disappearing coastlines and mass migrations. "Earth will be able to support enormously more people, because a far greater land area will be available to produce food". Koch opposed the Iraq War, saying that the war has "cost a lot of money and it's taken so many American lives", and "I question whether that was the right thing to do. In hindsight that looks like it was not a good policy." In an impromptu interview with the blog ThinkProgress, he was quoted as saying he would like the new, 2011 Republican Congress to "cut the hell out of spending, balance the budget, reduce regulations, and support business". Koch considered himself a social liberal who supported women's right to choose, gay rights, same-sex marriage, and stem-cell research. He opposed the war on drugs.

Koch opposed several of President Barack Obama's policies. An article from the Weekly Standard, detailing the "left's obsession" with the Koch brothers, quotes Koch stating that Obama is "the most radical president we've ever had as a nation ... and has done more damage to the free enterprise system and long-term prosperity than any president we've ever had". Koch said that Obama's father's economic socialism, practiced in Kenya, explains why Obama has "sort of antibusiness and anti-free enterprise" influences. Koch said that Obama is "scary", a "hardcore socialist" who is "marvelous at pretending to be something other than that". Koch contributed almost entirely to Republican candidates in 2012.

=== Advocacy ===
Koch donated funds to various advocacy groups. In 1984, he founded Citizens for a Sound Economy (CSE). He served as its chairman of the board of directors and donated funds to it. Richard H. Fink served as its first president. Koch was the chairman of the board and gave initial funding to the Americans for Prosperity Foundation and to a related advocacy organization, Americans for Prosperity. A Koch Industries spokesperson issued a press release stating "No funding has been provided by Koch companies, the Koch foundations, or Charles Koch or David Koch specifically to support the tea parties." Koch was the top initial funder of the Americans for Prosperity Foundation at $850,000. Koch said that he sympathized with the Tea Party movement, but denied directly supporting it, having stated that: "I've never been to a tea party event. No one representing the tea party has ever even approached me."

Koch sat on the board of the libertarian Cato Institute and Reason Foundation and donated to both organizations. The Koch brothers have been involved in blocking regulations and legislation to confront climate change since 1991, when the Cato Institute held the "Global Environmental Crisis: Science or Politics?" According to NPR, the Koch brothers gave "over $145 million to climate-change denying think tanks and advocacy groups between 1997 and 2018."

In August 2010, Jane Mayer wrote an article in The New Yorker on the political spending of David and Charles Koch. It stated: "As their fortunes grew, Charles and David Koch became the primary underwriters of hard-line libertarian politics in America." An opinion piece by journalist Yasha Levine in The New York Observer said Mayer's article had failed to mention that the Kochs' "free market philanthropy belies the immense profit they have made from corporate welfare".

In 2011, 2014, and 2015 Time magazine included Charles and David Koch among the Time 100 of the year, for their involvement in supporting the Tea Party movement and the criticism they received.

==== Prison reform ====
In July 2015, David and Charles Koch were commended by both President Obama and activist Anthony Van Jones for their bipartisan efforts to reform the prison system in the United States. For nearly 10 years, the Kochs advocated for several reforms within the criminal justice system which include reducing recidivism rates, simplifying the employment process for the rehabilitated, and defending private property from government seizures through asset forfeiture. Allying with groups such as the ACLU, the Center for American Progress, Families Against Mandatory Minimums, the Coalition for Public Safety, and the MacArthur Foundation, the Kochs maintained that current prison system unfairly targeted low-income and minority communities at the expense of the public budget.

The Koch brothers' advocacy has also attracted scrutiny and criticism. Michelle Chen, writing in The Nation, and William C. Anderson, writing in The Guardian, caution that the Kochs' efforts reflect broader interests in further privatizing the criminal justice system. In 2015, The Intercept reported that the Kochs' philanthropic efforts exist alongside continued funding of "tough-on-crime" political candidates and committees pushing for harsher sentencing. Writing in Political Research Associates, Kay Whitlock argues that the Kochs' avid support for measures such as mens rea or "criminal intent" reform exemplify "an agenda of deregulation and relief for 'overcriminalized' corporations and executives" rather than concern for individual rights of the accused.

== Philanthropy ==
Koch established the David H. Koch Charitable Foundation. Beginning in 2006, the Chronicle of Philanthropy listed Koch as one of the world's top 50 philanthropists. He sat on the Board of Trustees of NewYork–Presbyterian Hospital from 1988 until his death in 2019.

Overall, Koch donated more than $1.3 billion to philanthropic causes.

=== Arts ===
Koch had a lifelong interest in the arts, which he attributed to his mother's role in introducing him to opera and ballet during his childhood. In July 2008, Koch pledged $100 million over 10 years to renovate the New York State Theater in the Lincoln Center for the Performing Arts; the Theater is the home of the New York City Ballet. According to The New York Times, Koch's gift was "transformative, enabling a full-scale renovation of the stage" that included "an enlarged orchestra pit that mechanically rises". The theater was renamed the David H. Koch Theater. Koch also pledged $10 million to renovate fountains outside the Metropolitan Museum of Art. He was elected to the Board of Trustees of The Metropolitan Museum of Art in 2008.

Koch was the longest-serving trustee of the American Ballet Theatre, serving on its board for 25 years and contributing more than $6 million to the theater. He was also a member of the Board of Trustees of WGBH-TV.

=== Education ===
From 1982 to 2013, Koch contributed $18.6 million to WGBH Educational Foundation, including $10 million to the Public Broadcasting Service (PBS) show Nova. Koch was a contributor to the Smithsonian Institution in Washington, D.C., including a $20 million gift to the American Museum of Natural History (AMNH), creating the David H. Koch Dinosaur Wing and a contribution of $15 million to the National Museum of Natural History to create the new David H. Koch Hall of Human Origins, which opened on the museum's 100th anniversary of its location on the National Mall on March 17, 2010. Koch served on the advisory council for the Smithsonian and the board of the AMNH. He also served on the executive board of the Institute of Human Origins. In 2012, Koch contributed US$35 million to the Smithsonian to build a new dinosaur exhibition hall at the National Museum of Natural History.

Koch was also a benefactor of the Deerfield Academy, his alma mater. The academy's natatorium, science center, and field house are named after him. Koch was named the academy's first Lifetime Trustee. He contributed $70 million to the boarding school.

=== Medical research ===
Koch said his biggest contributions go toward a "moon shot" campaign to finding the cure for cancer, according to his profile on Forbes. Between 1998 and 2012, Koch contributed at least $395 million to medical research causes and institutions.

Koch has sat on the Board of Trustees of NewYork–Presbyterian Hospital since 1987. In 2007 he donated $15 million to NewYork–Presbyterian. In 2013, he gave $100 million to NewYork–Presbyterian Hospital, the then-largest philanthropic donation in its history, beginning a $2 billion campaign, to conclude in 2019, for a new ambulatory care center and renovation of the infrastructure of the hospital's five sites.

Koch was a member of the board of directors of the Prostate Cancer Foundation and contributed $41 million to the foundation, including $5 million to a collaborative project in the field of nanotechnology. An eponym of the David H. Koch Chair of the Prostate Cancer Foundation, the position is held by Dr. Jonathan Simons.

In 2006, Koch gave $20 million to Johns Hopkins University School of Medicine in Baltimore for cancer research. The building he financed was named the David H. Koch Cancer Research Building.

In 2007, he contributed $100 million to the Massachusetts Institute of Technology for the construction of a new 350,000-square-foot (33,000 m^{2}) research and technology facility to serve as the home of the David H. Koch Institute for Integrative Cancer Research. From the time he joined the MIT Corporation in 1988, Koch has given at least $185 million to MIT, and $30 million to the Memorial Sloan Kettering Cancer Center in New York City. The same year, he donated $25 million to the University of Texas M. D. Anderson Cancer Center in Houston to establish the David Koch Center for Applied Research in Genitourinary Cancers.

In 2011 Koch gave $5 million to the House Ear Institute, in Los Angeles, to create a center for hearing restoration, and $25 million to the Hospital for Special Surgery in New York City

In 2015, he committed $150 million to Memorial Sloan Kettering Cancer Center in New York City to build the David H. Koch Center for Cancer Care, which will be housed in a 23-story building in development between East 73rd and 74th Streets overlooking the FDR Drive. The center will combine state-of-the-art cancer treatment in an environment that supports patients, families, and caregivers. The building will include flexible personal and community spaces, educational offerings, and opportunities for physical exercise. Koch also donated $10 million to the Cold Spring Harbor Laboratory for biomathematics research.

== Wealth ==
Koch was the fourth-richest person in the United States in 2012 and was the wealthiest resident of New York City in 2013. As of June 2019, Koch was ranked as the 11th-richest person in the world (tied with his brother Charles), with a fortune of $50.5 billion.

== Personal life ==
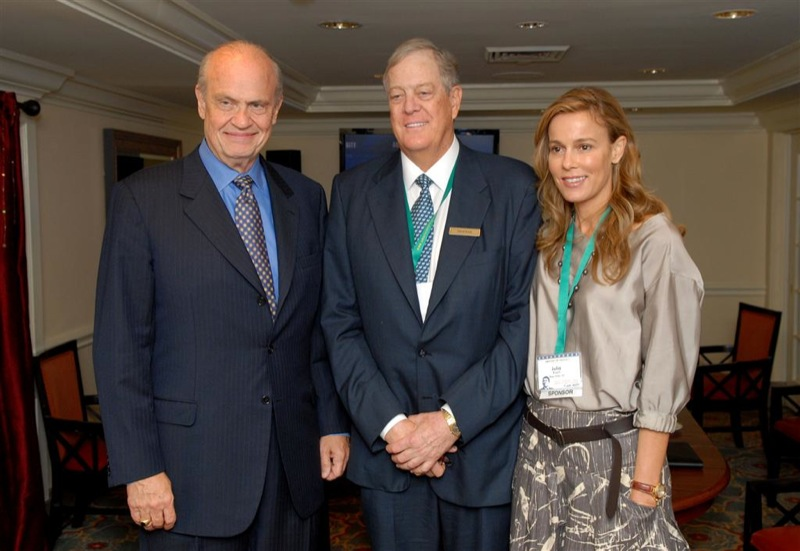
Fred Thompson poses with David Koch and his wife Julia Koch.

In February 1991, Koch was seriously injured as a passenger on board USAir Flight 1493 when it collided with another aircraft on a runway at Los Angeles International Airport, killing 35 people. Koch survived and said in an interview in 2014 that it helped change his life and prompted him to become "tremendously philanthropic."

When he was named lifetime trustee at Deerfield Academy in 2010, he said: “I would like to be known in the future as someone who is not just a wealthy, successful businessman but someone who really cared about the well-being of others—did his darndest to be charitable and help others.”

Following Jacqueline Kennedy Onassis' death in 1994, Koch purchased her 15-room apartment at 1040 Fifth Avenue. In 1996 he married Julia Flesher. The apartment "wasn't roomy enough" after the birth of their third child, so Koch sold it to billionaire Glenn Dubin in 2006 and moved with his family to 740 Park Avenue. They had three children together; David Jr., Mary Julia, and John. Mary Julia is an associate opinion editor at The Wall Street Journal and formerly was a staff reporter for The New York Sun and editor-in-chief of The Harvard Independent.

=== Health and death ===
In 1992, Koch was diagnosed with prostate cancer. He underwent radiation, surgery, and hormone therapy, but the cancer repeatedly returned. Koch said he believed his experience with cancer encouraged him to fund medical research.

Koch died at his home in Southampton, New York, on August 23, 2019, at the age of 79. Koch's wife, Julia Koch, and their three children inherited a 42% stake in Koch Industries from Koch upon his death.

== See also ==
- Koch family
- Koch Brothers Exposed (2012)

Party political offices
Preceded by David Bergland	Libertarian nominee for Vice President of the United States; 1980	Succeeded by Jim Lewis
