= Market-Based Management Institute =

American non-profit organisation

- Founded: 2005
- Founder: Charles G. Koch
- Type: 501(c)(3) charitable educational organization
- Purpose: Management strategy
- Location: Wichita, Kansas, U.S.
- Region served: Worldwide
- Method: Education, Industry benchmarking, Conferences and Seminars
- Key people: Tony Woodlief, Research Fellow Abel Winn, Director of Experimental Economics; Alastair Walling, Research Fellow; Ben Pratt, Senior Fellow Becky Gray, Office Manager
- Website: https://www.charleskochinstitute.org

The Market-Based Management Institute (MBM) is a non-profit organization based in Wichita, Kansas which researches management strategies to educate students, educators, community leaders, non-profit organizations and government leaders in the concepts and methods of management that their research has developed.

== History ==
The MBM Institute was founded in 2005 by Charles G. Koch, chairman and CEO of Koch Industries, and author of The Science of Success, in which he introduced his concept of "Market-Based Management." Koch developed his idea of MBM after some study into the nature of free market economies, likely influenced, in part, by his father's experiences.

His father (and co-founder of Koch Industries), Fred C. Koch, had spent time developing petroleum cracking units in the Soviet Union under Joseph Stalin's regime between 1929 and 1932, and came back with a deep disdain for the communist regime's totalitarianism. He described the nation as "a land of hunger, misery, and terror," and later, lamented the fact that many of the engineers he had worked with there had been purged by Stalin's regime, along with a great many other "intellectuals".

The Kochs saw the necessity of freedom to the success of societies, and translated that into their business practices—this is the basis of Market-Based Management; the implementation of which was a major factor in allowing Koch Industries to grow to become the second largest privately held company in the United States.

== Market-Based Management approach ==
MBM challenges traditional American business practices, and encourages a relatively flat hierarchical structure, with the free flow of ideas between all levels of an organization. Employees are encouraged to approach their work from an entrepreneurial perspective, and be rewarded based on the value that they bring to the company, rather than only the amount of time that they spend at work. This encourages workers to use their own deductive powers to overcome obstacles and be creative in their decision-making, rather than waiting for orders from higher-ups. Problem solving, the theory contends, is best carried out by those closest to the problem - the workers. This, they say, is the best way to utilize the "collective brainpower" of the entire organization, rather than just that of the few top decision-makers. Research fellow Tony Woodlief explains:

At the biggest level, essentially what we’re talking about is helping the owner or the manager transition from being somebody who makes all the decisions and has to deal with all the problems, into being a coach and a leader on a team of people who can use their own brains. And that, I think, not only leads to a more successful company because you’ve got more brains involved, but it also allows the manager to be the person that he probably envisioned being when he first got into management, instead of a prison warden or a babysitter or somebody who has to solve problems that common sense ought to be able to solve.

Woodlief goes on to note, however, that this is not always the best system for organizations to implement immediately, as it puts a lot of responsibility on individual employees to make decisions on their own, and consequently be held accountable for them, and it can also be difficult for managers to adjust to their role to "coach and lead" employees rather than the broad decision-making roles they are more accustomed to.

== Operations of the MBM Institute ==
=== Training ===
The MBM Institute has conducted training and consultation for businesses and other organizations in the implementation of Marked-Based Management. Among them are several other non-profit organizations such as the Youth Entrepreneurs of Kansas, the Bill of Rights Institute, and the Wichita Non-profit Chamber. They have also supported through teaching and mentoring the Charles G. Koch Charitable Foundation's Associate Program, a year-long program for college graduates to learn how to apply market-based management.

=== Research ===
Through a partnership with Wichita State University(WSU), in 2007, the MBM Institute opened an experimental economics laboratory based in the university's W. Frank Barton School of Business, the first of its kind in the nation. The laboratory uses human participants who respond to sets of experimental situations in ways to maximize their efficiency. Their success is rewarded with cash awards that vary based on their success, creating a more realistic experimental environment in which to test new ideas. The efficient concepts learned can then be applied in real-world situations to measure their efficacy.

=== Teaching ===
Staff from the institute teach classes at the W. Frank Barton School of Business, also through their partnership with WSU. The classes are in experimental economics, as well as a course called "Economic Thinking Inside an Organization," a multidisciplinary survey of how MBM is implemented and its real-world applications.
