= Stephen M. Badger =

American Mars, Inc. heir, businessman and film producer

- Born: Stephen Mills Badger II; September 18, 1968 (age 57)
- Occupations: Businessman, producer
- Employer: The March Group
- Title: General Partner
- Family: Mars family

Stephen Mills Badger II (born September 18, 1968) is an American businessman, venture capitalist and documentary producer. He is currently a General Partner at The March Group, a food, health and sustainability venture capital firm based in Davis, California and Hong Kong.

== Early life ==
Stephen Mills Badger is a member of the Mars family, His mother is Mars heiress Jacqueline Mars. His father was David H. Badger. His maternal great-grandfather, Franklin Clarence Mars, was the founder of Mars, Incorporated.

== Career ==
Badger is currently a General Partner at The March Group. He also serves on the Board of Directors of Mars, Inc, his family business. In 2007, he spoke on behalf of Seeds of Change, a manufacturer of organic food acquired by Mars, Inc. In November 2014, he attended the third annual Global Action Summit in Nashville, Tennessee, where he accepted the Global Shared Value Award on behalf of the company.

Additionally, Badger serves on the Board of Directors of Island Press, a publisher of books on ecology and conservation.

In 2012 and 2013, Badger produced Muscle Shoals, a documentary film about FAME Studios and Muscle Shoals Sound Studio in Muscle Shoals, Alabama.

== Personal life ==
He resides in Santa Fe, New Mexico.
