= Ambra Vallo =

Italian classical ballet dancer

Ambra Vallo is an Italian classical ballet dancer. Born in Naples, Italy, she was a principal dancer with the Birmingham Royal Ballet.

== Biography and career ==
She trained at the Royal Ballet School of Flanders. At seventeen she was invited as a guest artist by Vladimir Vasiliev to inaugurate the ballet season of the Teatro dell'Opera di Roma. Already soloist of the Ballet royal de Wallonie and after of the Royal Ballet of Flanders, she has been senior soloist of the English National Ballet since 1993. At the Royal Festival Hall in 1995 Vallo was Juliet and received the personal congratulations of Lady Diana.

Sha danced at the Metropolitan Opera House of New York City in a reconstruction of ballets of Frederick Ashton

From 2001 to 2013 she was as a principal of the Birmingham Royal Ballet before her retirement.

== Awards ==
She won first prize at the Luxemburg International Grand Prix, and the silver medal at Houlgate, France.

In Italy, she won prizes at Danza e Danza (Best dancer, 2004), Positano (Prize of the critic, 1991 and 2002), Rieti (gold medal). In 2009, at the Teatro di San Carlo of Naples, she received with Fabio Cannavaro and Gianluigi Aponte the prize "Neapolitan excellence in the world" by the President Silvio Berlusconi.

== Roles and repertory ==
She has created roles for ballets, including: Bintley's Titania in The Shakespeare Suite, Annunciation in The Protecting Veil, Wild Girl in the Beauty and the Beast, Kim Brandstrup's Pimpinella in Pulcinella, Lila York's Sanctum, Stanton Welch's Powder and Luciano Cannito's Te voglio bene assaje.

Her principal repertory: Giselle (title role), Romeo and Juliet (Juliet), the Sleeping Beauty (Aurora), Swan Lake (Odette/Odile), the Nutcracker (Sugar Plum Fairy), Coppélia (Swanilda), Don Quixote (Kitri), la Fille mal gardée (Lise), Cinderella (title role), Bournonville's Napoli (title role), le Corsaire, Diana and Actaeon pas de deux, Paquita, la Bayadère, Études (leading role), Graduation Ball, Elite Syncopations ('Calliope Rag'), Solitaire (Polka Girl), The Two Pigeons (Young Girl), Voices of Spring, The Walk to the Paradise Garden, Enigma Variations (Dorabella), Apollo (Polyhymnia), Symphonic Variations, Serenade, Symphony in Three Movements, The Four Temperaments (Sanguine Variation), Concerto barocco, Square Dance, Tchaikovsky pas de deux, Tarantella, Western Symphony, Bintley's Far from the Madding Crowd (Bathsheba), Edward II (Isabella), Arthur (Guinevere), Beauty and the Beast (Belle), Hobson's Choice (Vickey Hobson, Salvation Army), Carmina burana (Lover Girl), Choros, Dance House, The Seasons ('Spring'), Twyla Tharp's In the Upper Room and van Manen's Five Tangos.
