= Mary R. Koch =

History
- Name: Main Ore (1985–1996); Mary R. Koch (1975–1985)
- Owner: VALECO tankers Corp.; First Trust Co of Saint Paul; Mansfield Sg Co Ltd
- Operator: Dorian Hellas SA (1979–1985)
- Port of registry: Liberia (1975–1985); Saint Vincent and the Grenadines (1985–1996)
- Builder: Uljanik, Brodogradiliste l Tvornica Dizel Motora; Pula, Yugoslavia, (now Croatia)
- Yard number: 303
- Launched: 17 November 1974
- Completed: April 1975
- Out of service: 1996
- Identification: DNV ID: IMO number: 7391458
- Fate: Scrapped at Alang 9 June 1997

General characteristics
- Tonnage: 136,991 GT; 120,376 NT; 264,999 DWT
- Displacement: 274.330 long tons full load
- Length: 335.0 m (1,099 ft 1 in)
- Beam: 52.20 m (171 ft 3 in)
- Draught: 21.794 m (71 ft 6.0 in)
- Depth: 28.00 m (91 ft 10 in)
- Installed power: 29,422 kW (39,456 hp)
- Propulsion: Burmeister & Wain
- Speed: 16.5 knots (30.6 km/h; 19.0 mph)

Mary R. Koch was a 274.330-metric-ton (269.997-long-ton; 302.397-short-ton) combined ore carrier and oil tanker. The ship was named after Mary Robinson Koch, wife of American industrialist Fred C. Koch.

Mary R. Koch was built at the Uljanik, Brodogradiliste l Tvornica Dizel Motora shipyard in Pula in Socialist Federal Republic of Yugoslavia, (now Croatia). Her two sister ships, Tafala and Torne were delivered to the Swedish company Trafikaktiebolaget Grengesberg in 1974. A further sister ship named Kanchenjunga was built as a pure oil carrier with no ore capability.

Under Greek management Mary R. Koch (callsign A8QU) was time-chartered to Exxon for three years from going into service. Subsequently she made spot voyages arranged by the oil-trading division of Koch Industries. Around 1980 Koch Shipping was created and Mary R. Koch was managed directly from Wichita, with officers and crew being supplied by an agency in Piraeus. Due to severe corrosion problems with piping in the 'void space' double bottom the ship transferred to the bulk-ore trade in the early 1980s.

The four ships of this design were built to prove the practicality of the KaMeWa variable pitch propeller system in high SHP applications. Although the system did function well the high initial and subsequent maintenance costs associated with having two 20,000 hp (15,000 kW) B&W diesel engines, together with the inferior steel used for the cargo piping, compounded by the depressed tanker market at the time, meant that they were never viable economically.
