= Bill of Rights Institute =

Nonprofit organization in the U.S.

- Founded: September 1999
- Founder: Charles G. Koch and the Charles G. Koch Charitable Foundation
- Type: Nonprofit
- Tax ID no.: 48-0891418
- Location(s): 1310 North Courthouse Road; Arlington, Virginia 22203
- Coordinates: 38.8720°N 77.1036°W
- Region served: United States
- Key people: David Bobb (president)
- Revenue: $9.75 million (2024)
- Expenses: $9.69 million (2024)
- Website: www.billofrightsinstitute.org

The Bill of Rights Institute (BRI) is a nonprofit educational organization based in Arlington, Virginia, that develops educational resources on American history and government, provides professional development opportunities and grants to teachers, and runs student programs and scholarship contests. BRI also administers an annual National Civics Teacher of the Year award recognizing excellence in civics education.

== History ==
The Bill of Rights Institute was founded in September 1999 by industrialist Charles Koch and the Charles G. Koch Charitable Foundation.

Koch has explained that he became concerned with education in the field of constitutional law after he saw that many high school teachers had inadequate resources to develop educational materials on the principles, institutions, and ideas upon which the United States was founded. Critics have stated that BRI promotes a conservative/libertarian view of the United States Constitution.

=== Leadership ===
The nonprofit's first president, Victoria Hughes, was a teacher who had previously held executive roles in other non-profit organizations. Hughes led the organization for a decade until her departure, after which Tony Woodlief filled her position as president.

David Bobb, a former Hillsdale College professor and head of its Allan P. Kirby, Jr. Center for Constitutional Studies and Citizenship, became BRI's president in December 2013.

== Activities ==
=== Professional development ===
BRI runs educational programs for teachers around the country. BRI conducted 64 constitutional seminars in the 2010–2011 school year, often held at historic sites such as George Washington's Mount Vernon or James Madison's Montpelier. Seminars include instruction from a university professor and training by a BRI master teacher. BRI professors include BRI board member and professor of law at George Mason University Todd Zywicki; author and professor of public policy at Pepperdine University Dr. Gordon Lloyd; University of Texas School of Law and Professor Dr. H.W. Perry Jr.

=== Online educational resources ===
In August 2014, Bill of Rights Institute launched Documents of Freedom, a free digital course on history, government, and economics. The course builds on excerpts from over 100 primary sources, including the Federalist and Anti-Federalist papers, presidential speeches, Supreme Court cases, and the Founding documents; and it offers an extensive set of original essays, focusing on principles such as federalism, separation of powers, limited government, checks and balances, republican government, consent of the governed, natural rights, rule of law, and due process, as well as virtues like self-governance, humility, integrity, justice, perseverance, respect, contribution, and responsibility.

=== Student programs ===
==== Essay contest ====
In 2006, BRI began a high school essay contest which asks students to reflect on civic values. Individuals who have taken part in the awards weekend include Supreme Court Justices Sandra Day O'Connor and Clarence Thomas, journalist John Stossel, journalist and political analyst Juan Williams, Judge Andrew Napolitano, and NBA player Antawn Jamison.

==== Constitutional Academy ====
Other student programs run by BRI include the Constitutional Academy, which provides students with a six-week study of the Constitution in Washington, D.C. In 2011 the Ford Motor Company Fund provided scholarships to eleven students to attend the Constitutional Academy.

==== MyImpact Challenge ====
BRI hosts the MyImpact Challenge, a civic engagement contest open to U.S. citizens and U.S.-based young people who are between the ages of 13 and 19 and enrolled in middle or high school.

=== BRI National Civics Teacher of the Year ===
BRI presents an annual National Civics Teacher of the Year award to one civics teacher in the United States. Nominations begin in the spring and the award recipient is announced in the fall.

The 2025 National Civics Teacher of the Year was awarded to Veronica Pitts, a high school teacher in Selma, Alabama. Pitts was awarded with $5,000 for use in her classroom and a scholarship to attend the National Council of Social Studies annual conference in Washington, D.C. U.S. Representative Terri Sewell (D-Selma), congratulated Pitts for winning the award on the House Floor.

== Funding ==
In September 2025, BRI was awarded a two-year Carnegie grant for $750,000 to create free civic skills resources for teachers to use in the classroom.
