= Caremar =

Italian shipping company

Caremar S.p.A.
- House flag
- Industry: Passenger transportation
- Founded: November 5, 1975
- Headquarters: Naples, Campania, Italy
- Area served: Tyrrhenian Sea
- Key people: Gianluigi Aponte; Roberto Liguori
- Website: https://mobile.caremar.it/it/

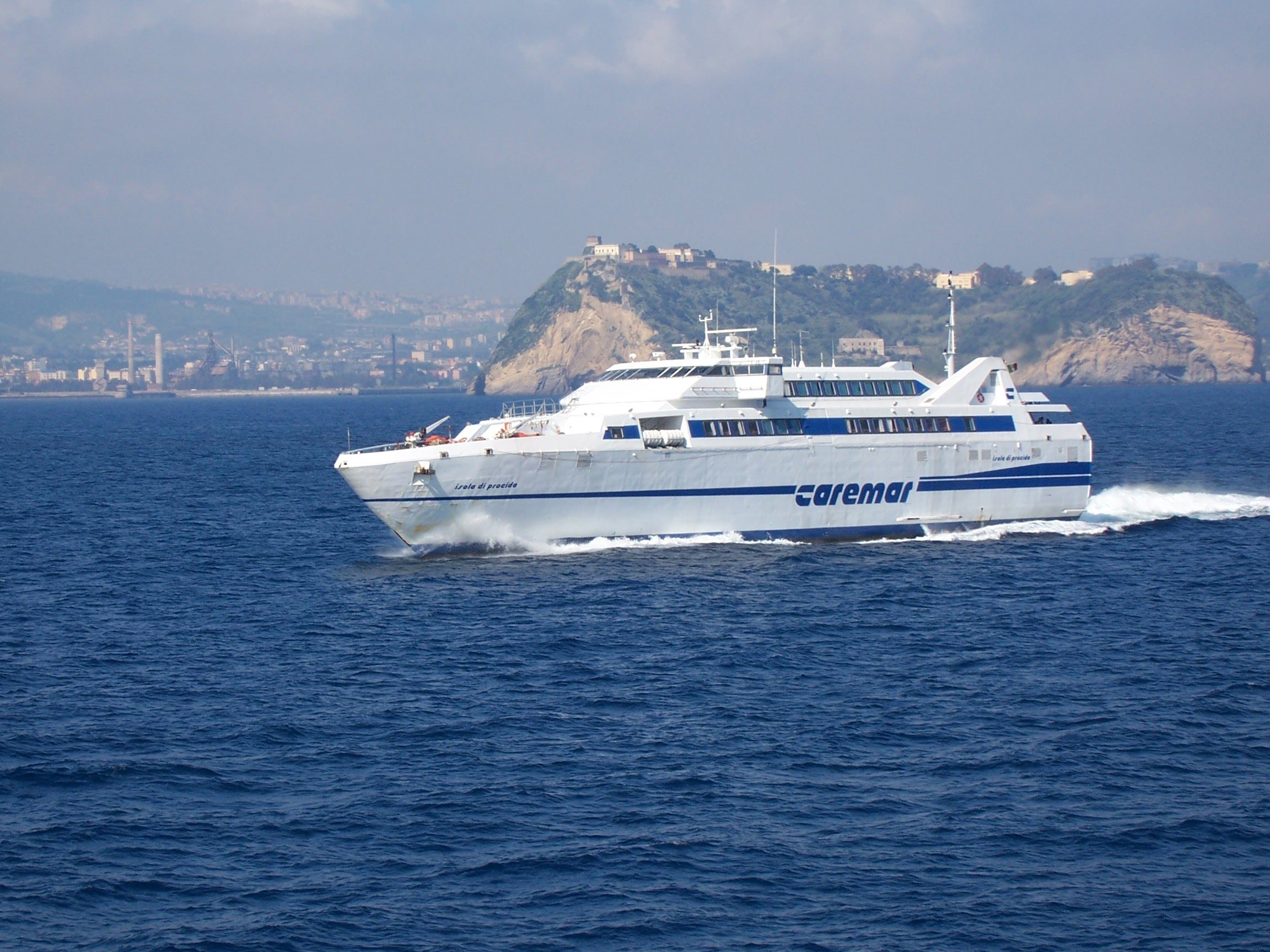
Isola di Procida fast ferry.

Caremar (Campania Regionale Marittima) is an Italian shipping company, a subdivision of state-owned Tirrenia di Navigazione until 2009, when it was transferred to the Campania regional government and later in 2012 to the Mediterranean Shipping Company. It operates in routes from Campania to Capri, Ischia, Procida.

== Fleet ==
Name	Tonnage	Passengers	Car capacity / l.m.	Speed Knots	Type
Fauno	1,390	1,000	60	20	Ferry
Naiade	1,500	1,250	60	18	Ferry
Driade	1,390	1,000	60	17	Ferry
Adeona	1,500	1,250	60	17	Ferry
Nereide Ex Posidonia	1,500	1,250	75	17	Ferry Actually rental at Medmar company of gulf of Naples
Isola di Capraia	1900	620	57	28	Fast Ferry
Isola di Procida	1900	620	57	28	Fast ferry
Isola di Capri	1900	620	57	28	Fast ferry
Isola di San Pietro	383	350	N.D	31	Fast Passenger Monohull
Achernar	624	440	N.D	30	Fast Passenger Catamaran
Shaula	233	196	N.D	35	Fast Passenger DSC Afo160

== Routes ==
- Ischia↔Procida
- Naples↔Casamicciola Terme
- Naples↔Ischia
- Naples↔Procida
- Pozzuoli↔Casamicciola Terme
- Pozzuoli↔Ischia
- Pozzuoli↔Procida
- Capri↔Sorrento
