= Chase Koch =

American businessman

- Born: June 15, 1977 (age 49); Wichita, Kansas, U.S.
- Education: Texas A&M University (BS)
- Occupation: Businessman
- Title: President of Koch Fertilizer
- Spouse: Annie Breitenbach (m. 2010; div. 2020)
- Children: 3
- Father: Charles Koch
- Relatives: Elizabeth Koch (sister)

Charles Chase Koch (/koʊk/ KOHK; born June 15, 1977), is an American businessman and the son of Charles Koch, the co-owner, CEO, and chairman of Koch Industries. Koch directs the venture capital company Koch Disruptive Technologies, and is a leading figure in Koch Industries and the family's philanthropic activities.

== Early life and education ==
Koch, who is named after his grandfather and father, was born on June 15, 1977 and raised in Wichita, Kansas, by his parents, Charles and Liz. Every Sunday, Charles Koch would educate Chase and his sister Elizabeth about his value system, libertarian economics, and philosophy. According to a 2018 profile in Politico, Chase's interest in education is rooted in that childhood tutoring, which involved listening to recordings of F.A. Hayek and Milton Friedman and discussing “values like courage and equal rights.”

Chase played basketball at the local YMCA and attended Wichita Collegiate School. In his teens, he worked on his family's ranches. His first job, at age 15, was at Koch's feed yard in Syracuse, Kansas, where he spent the summer digging post holes and shoveling bovine ordure. He later said that although "I hated Koch Industries at the time," the experience taught him "a critical life lesson about the importance of hard work."

In September 1993, at age 16, Koch ran a red light, hitting twelve-year-old Zachary Seibert with his car. Seibert died shortly thereafter at a local hospital. Chase pled guilty to a charge of misdemeanor vehicular homicide and was sentenced to 100 hours of community service and 18 months of probation.

Koch graduated from Texas A&M University with a B.S. in marketing. Koch has spoken of his upbringing in a variety of public speeches.

After graduating, he played in a band that covered songs by Led Zeppelin, Phish, and the Grateful Dead while trying to navigate his way into Austin's tech startup scene without exploiting his family connections. He told an audience in 2015 that he had seriously considered not pursuing a career in the family business.

== Business career ==
At age 25 or 26, Koch returned to Wichita, where he began to work for Koch Industries. During the next few years, he worked in a series of high-level positions at the company.

In 2006, Koch began working for Koch Nitrogen Company, working as a regional manager and in global supply. He was appointed president of Koch Fertilizer in 2013 and later named executive vice president of Koch Agronomic Services. As of 2016, he was president of Koch Agronomic Services.

In 2018, he became president of the newly founded Koch Disruptive Technologies, Koch Industries' venture-capital arm. Under his management, according to Bloomberg News, KDT has invested in sectors outside of Koch's traditional areas of expertise; among the firms in which he has invested is InSightec Ltd., which manufactures surgical tools that employ ultrasound. In a January 2019 interview on CNBC, he discussed KDT's interest in investing in "principled entrepreneurs" and in seeking out technologies that can transform methods of production.

Throughout his career at Koch, he has chosen to work in Wichita and not at the firm's Washington-area headquarters.

== Philanthropy ==
Since working at the family firm, Koch has become increasingly involved in his father's and uncle's political activities. He was present in 2003 when his father held a get-together at Chicago's Peninsula Hotel that marked the beginnings of what would later be known as the Koch network.

Koch has organized a philanthropic network, consisting of the adult children of Koch network members, to replace their aging parents and grandparents. When working with this network, reported Politico in 2018, Koch aims at nonpartisanship and avoids "the hard-charging political gamesmanship" often identified with the Kochs. Koch told Politico that, rather than becoming involved in political conflict, he preferred to find things that he and his philanthropic collaborators can agree on. His aim, he said, is "to be a bridge-builder and an innovator focused on civil society." In 2015, for example, he was involved in an antipoverty initiative that instructed nonprofits in the principles that helped Koch Industries to thrive. He has expressed concern about urban violence and police shootings and has lent his support to a nonprofit called Urban Specialists.

In January 2019, he told an interviewer that his public activities were guided by the aims of improving as many lives as possible and unlocking people's potential. He added that he eschewed partisanship and believed in forming coalitions across the political spectrum. He noted that he was working with people like Van Jones on issues like prison reform.

== Board memberships ==
Since 2013 he has been a member of the board of Koch Industries. He is also on the board of the Charles Koch Foundation and chairman of New Leaders.

== Personal life ==
In 2010, Koch married Annie Breitenbach, a former neonatal nurse. They lived on a 70-acre property in Wichita that Koch purchased for $3 million in 2010 and have three children. Their oldest son, Charles, was born in 2012. They divorced in 2020.

With Zach Lahn, a former Koch network fundraiser, Breitenbach opened Wonder, a private Montessori-style preschool and grade school on the campus of Wichita State University.

== Sources ==
- Leonard, Christopher (2019). "The Education of Chase Koch". Kochland: The Secret History of Koch Industries and Corporate Power in America. New York: Simon & Schuster. pp. 486–512. ISBN 978-1-4767-7538-8.
