= Jonathan Simons =

American oncologist

Jonathan W. Simons
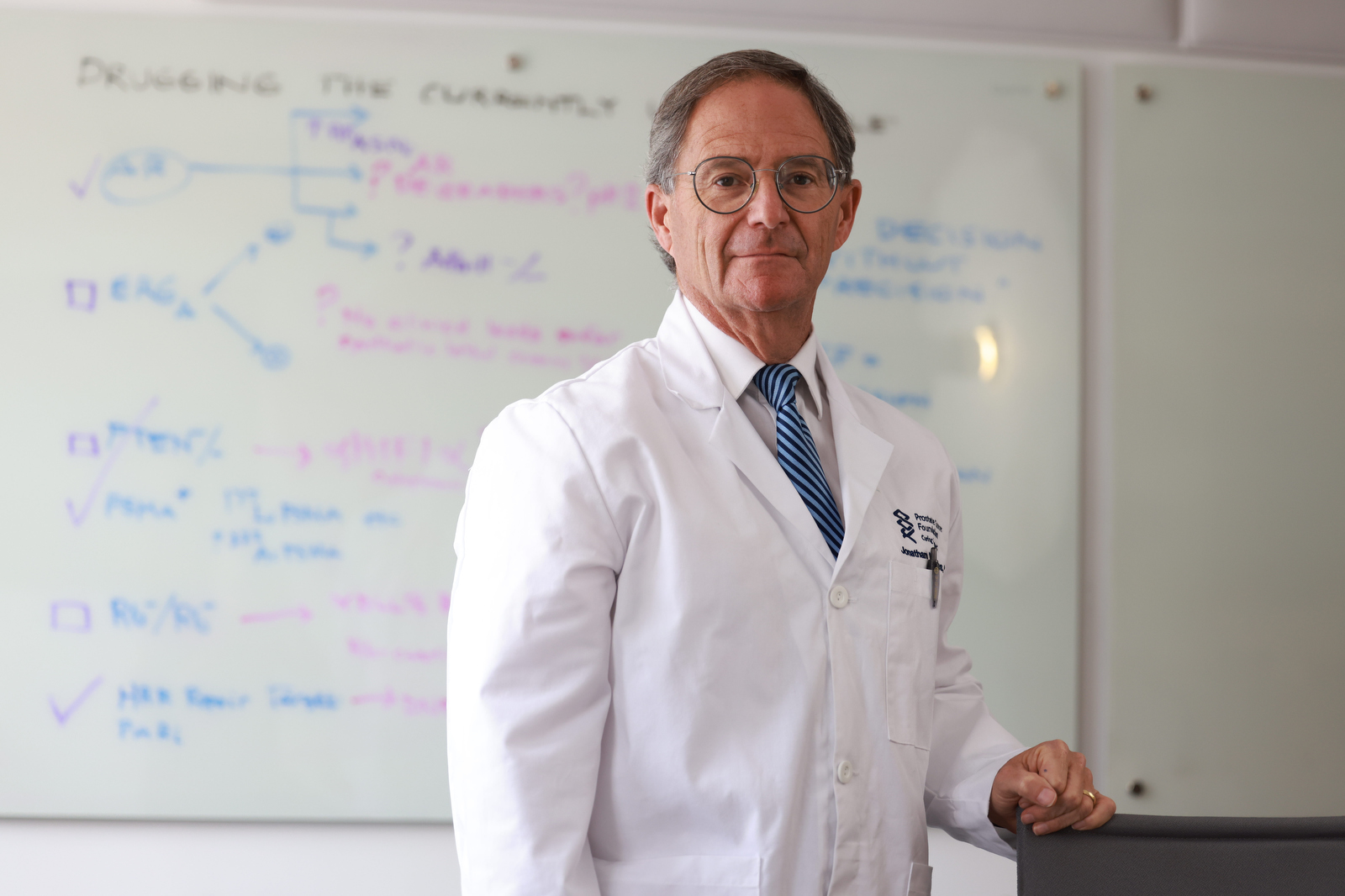
- Born: Washington, D.C., U.S.
- Education: Princeton University; Johns Hopkins School of Medicine
- Scientific career
- Workplaces: Johns Hopkins University School of Medicine; Emory University School of Medicine; Georgia Institute of Technology College of Engineering; Prostate Cancer Foundation
- Medical career
- Profession: Physician-scientist
- Sub-specialties: Oncologist
- Research: Prostate cancer

Jonathan W. Simons is an American physician-scientist, medical oncologist, and leader in prostate cancer research. In August 2021, Simons was appointed the medical director and Chief Science Officer of the Marcus Foundation. Prior to joining the Marcus Foundation, he served a 14-year tenure as the President and chief executive officer of the Prostate Cancer Foundation. Simons’ laboratories, partly funded by the Prostate Cancer Foundation, at Johns Hopkins University and Emory University made original contributions to understanding the molecular biology of prostate cancer metastasis and principles of “broken immune tolerance” via T cell based immunotherapy for prostate cancer. The Simons lab invented GM-CSF genetically engineered vaccines for prostate cancer in rodents and humans for these studies, and subsequently Simons’ clinical team took the biotechnology into the world’s first human gene therapy clinical trials for advanced prostate cancer at Johns Hopkins.

== Early life and education ==
Simons was raised in Ithaca, New York. He is the husband, son, and grandson of cancer survivors. Simons’ father, David M. Simons, a professor at Cornell University, was among the first thousand patients cured of relapsed Hodgkin’s Lymphoma as a part of participation in National Cancer Institute clinical trials. Simons is the grandson of M.L. Wilson, who served as the Under Secretary of Agriculture under President Franklin Roosevelt. A 1976 graduate of Ithaca High School, Simons graduated magna cum laude from Princeton University with an A.B. in biochemistry in 1980. Before entering medical school, Simons had a concentration in the Shakespeare Canon as a Rotary International Postgraduate Fellow in the Humanities at the University of Kent in Canterbury, England; subsequently he had a Nuffield Foundation research scholarship in the Department of Biochemistry at the University of Cambridge in 1981.

Simons received an MD degree from the Johns Hopkins University School of Medicine in 1985. He completed his residency in internal medicine at Massachusetts General Hospital and a clinical fellowship in medical oncology at the Johns Hopkins Oncology Center.

== Cancer research career ==
Simons is board-certified in internal medicine and medical oncology. At Johns Hopkins, Simons completed a post-doctoral fellowship under Bert Vogelstein in human cancer molecular genetics prior to being appointed to the Hopkins medical school faculty in oncology and urology in 1991. On the Hopkins faculty, Simons chaired the Hopkins medical school Curriculum Committee for Oncology from 1990 to 2000. Simons' first independent laboratory research grant was from the Prostate Cancer Foundation (formerly known as CaPCure) in the Foundation’s first year of existence in 1993.

Simons was recruited by Georgia Governor Roy Barnes, and the Robert W. Woodruff Foundation of Atlanta to be the Founding Director of the Winship Cancer Institute at Emory University and Chair of Hematology and Oncology at the Emory Clinic. Simons led the creation of the Georgia State Cancer Plan, Georgia’s tobacco settlement investment in cancer research and new faculty recruitment programs within the Georgia Cancer Coalition. Simons co-directed with Shuming Nie the National Cancer Institute Center for Cancer Nanotechnology Excellence at Emory and Georgia Institute of Technology. From 2000 to 2006, Simons was a Distinguished Service Professor of Hematology and Oncology at the Emory University School of Medicine, and Professor of Materials Sciences Engineering at the Georgia Institute of Technology.

With Michael Milken, chairman of the board of FasterCures, Simons created the strategic plan and served as the interim chief science officer for the launch of the Melanoma Research Alliance. The Melanoma Research Alliance was founded by Debra and Leon Black in 2007.

In 2011, Simons was inducted into the Johns Hopkins University Society of Scholars. The society inducts former postdoctoral fellows, postdoctoral degree recipients, house staff and junior or visiting faculty who have served at least a year at Johns Hopkins and thereafter gained marked distinction elsewhere in their fields.

Simons received the Johns Hopkins University Distinguished Alumni Award in 2020 from the Johns Hopkins University School of Medicine.

=== Prostate Cancer Foundation ===
Simons has led the expansion of PCF’s Research Awards globally to over 800 research awards in 22 countries including $590.0 million invested in peer-reviewed funding to 240 teams of scientists working on human genetics, molecular oncology, genomic medicines, molecular imaging, and "precision immunotherapy". In total, funding from the PCF Research Enterprise has propelled 14 FDA approvals in prostate cancer.

In 2008, 2011, and 2012, Simons launched new peer-reviewed research programs in the United Kingdom, China, and Ireland. The Prostate Cancer Foundation also increased its support for cancer researchers in Australia, Canada, and Greece through the PCF Hellenic Fund. In 2020, the PCF Global Research Enterprise extended to award investigators in 22 countries.

When Simons joined the Prostate Cancer Foundation in 2007, he launched the “PCF 100”, with the goal of securing support for 100 Young Investigators. Each Young Investigator receives a three-year award and total grant amount of $225,000, which is matched dollar-for-dollar by his or her university. PCF has invested more than $70 million to support 314 young investigators since 2007.

In 2016, as a part of Vice President Biden's Cancer Moonshot initiative, Simons announced a 5-year, Foundation-Government partnership with the Department of Veterans Affairs for a precision oncology clinical research and care program for every US veteran with prostate cancer in the VA.

In 2020, Simons launched the Prostate Cancer Theranostics and Imaging Centre of Excellence (ProsTIC) at the Peter MacCallum Cancer Centre in Melbourne, Australia.
