= Rafaela Aponte-Diamant =

Swiss Israeli businesswoman

- רפאלה אפונטה-דיאמנט
- Born: Rafaela Diamant; 26 March 1945 (age 81); Haifa, Mandatory Palestine
- Citizenship: Italian
- Occupations: Founder, Mediterranean Shipping Company
- Spouse: Gianluigi Aponte
- Children: 2

Rafaela Aponte-Diamant (Hebrew: רפאלה אפונטה-דיאמנט) is an Italian-Israeli billionaire and a co-founder of the Mediterranean Shipping Company (MSC) Group, along with her husband, Gianluigi Aponte.

As of 2026, Forbes estimated Aponte-Diamant's net worth at $44.5 billion, ranking her as the 42nd-richest person in the world.

== Early life ==
Aponte-Diamant was born in Haifa, Mandatory Palestine. As a child, she and her parents then immigrated to Switzerland, where her father worked as an executive banker in Geneva, Switzerland.

== Personal life ==
Aponte-Diamant is married to Gianluigi Aponte, an Italian businessman. They met when she was a passenger on a boat of which he was the captain. They have two children, Diego Aponte, who is group president of MSC and was the company's CEO from 2014 until November 2019, and Alexa Aponte Vago, who is CFO of MSC. The Apontes reside in Switzerland.

In April 2026, it was announced that the Aponte family had completed a transfer of ownership of the company to their two children, Diego Aponte and Alexa Aponte Vago.
