= Jacqueline Mars =

American billionaire and philanthropist (born 1939)

- Born: October 10, 1939 (age 86)
- Education: Bryn Mawr College (BA)
- Known for: Mars, Inc. fortune
- Spouses: David Badger (m. 1961; div. 1984); Hank Vogel (m. 1986; div. 1994)
- Family: Mars family

Jacqueline Mars (born October 10, 1939) is an American heiress and investor. She is the daughter of Audrey Ruth (Meyer) and Forrest Mars Sr., and the granddaughter of Franklin Clarence Mars, founders of the American candy company Mars Inc. As of November 2023, the Bloomberg Billionaires Index estimated her net worth at US$46.6 billion, ranking her the 23rd-richest person in the world. In the annual ranking of the richest women in the world in 2023, Forbes estimated her fortune at $38.3 billion and placed her in fourth place.

== Early life ==
Jacqueline Mars was born on October 10, 1939. She graduated from Miss Hall's School in Pittsfield, Massachusetts. Mars participated as an equestrian in many horse shows during her youth. She is a 1961 graduate of Bryn Mawr College and her degree is in anthropology.

== Career ==
Mars is an heiress among the members of the Mars family that founded and owns Mars Incorporated, holding shares in the company. As a member of the family, her shares of Mars, Inc. and other assets were estimated by Forbes magazine in April 2024 to be worth $38.5 billion, making her the 19th richest American, and #34 on its list of "The World's Billionaires". Mars was active in Mars, Inc. from 1982, when she joined the company as food product group president. She spent the majority of her time working for the Mars Foundation, a philanthropic nonprofit supported by the company. She retired in 2001. In June 2019, Forbes listed her as the wealthiest resident living in Virginia, with an estimated $28.1 billion net worth.

== Personal life ==
Mars married David H. Badger in 1961. They had three children: Alexandra Badger born 1966 or 1967 (age 59–60), Stephen M. Badger born c.1969 (age 56–57), and Christa M. Badger born c.1975 (age 50–51). She divorced Badger in 1984.

She married Harold 'Hank' Vogel in 1986, with whom she resided in Bedminster, New Jersey. They divorced in 1994.

Mars, like her siblings, is known for living frugally and avoiding the public eye.

Mars is a trustee of the U.S. Equestrian Team. She owns a working organic farm that is protected in perpetuity by the Land Trust of Virginia.

=== 2013 automobile crash ===
On October 4, 2013, at the age of 74, Mars was involved in a car crash on U.S. Route 50 in Aldie, near her home in The Plains in Northern Virginia.Her vehicle crossed the highway center line and struck a Chrysler minivan carrying six passengers. One person died at the scene and another, who was pregnant, subsequently miscarried. Mars was charged with reckless driving. She told a witness after the crash that she had fallen asleep at the wheel. Mars subsequently pleaded guilty to the misdemeanor charge of reckless driving, with tests having revealed no drugs, alcohol, or medications in her system that could have caused a blackout.

== Philanthropy ==
Mars is the Chairman Emeritus of the board of directors for the Washington National Opera and is on the board of the National Sporting Library and Fine Arts Museum. Mars also sits on the National Advisory Council of the Journey through Hallowed Ground, a foundation promoting American heritage in the region stretching from Gettysburg, Pennsylvania to Monticello, the home of Thomas Jefferson that is situated just outside Charlottesville, Virginia.

Mars is a routine donor to the League of Conservation Voters. She has also donated to the National Air and Space Museum, the Washington Performing Arts Society. In 2011, she received the inaugural Heritage Award granted by the Foundation for the National Archives.

In 2021, she made a $1.25 million donation to help house "Angels Unawares", a sculpture by Timothy Schmalz, at The Catholic University of America.

In March 2026, Mars gifted $10 million towards undergraduate scholarships at her alma mater, Bryn Mawr College. Mars stated: “Bryn Mawr has long been a place where talented students thrive… I hope this gift helps ensure that financial need is never a barrier to that opportunity.”
