= The Science of Success =

The Science of Success: How Market Based Management Built the World's Largest Private Company
- Author: Charles G. Koch
- Language: English
- Genre: Management
- Publisher: John Wiley & Sons
- Publication date: 2 March 2007
- Pages: 208
- ISBN: 978-0-470-13988-2
- OCLC: 85821632
- Dewey Decimal: 658.4/09 22
- LC Class: HD31 .K598214 2007

The Science of Success: How Market-Based Management Built the World's Largest Private Company is a book written by Charles Koch in which he delineates his philosophy of Market Based Management (MBM). Koch, the CEO of Koch Industries, Inc., wrote it in 2007. While many similarly-titled books by other authors exist, T. Boone Pickens argues that Koch's immense personal business success lends credibility to the book's concept.

== Purpose ==
Koch has said that he initially wrote the book after the 2004 acquisition of Invista with the intent of using it as a sort of training manual to give a comprehensive picture of Koch Industries' business philosophy and to explain the principles of MBM to the new employees; Koch had initially conducted much of the training of new employees, but as the company grew, it soon became an impossible task, and necessitated the implementation of some other training method. He was later convinced to expand the "training manual" to share his philosophies with a wider audience.

Koch credits much of the success of Koch Industries to effective implementation of Market Based Management (MBM), but indicates that it still has not been fully implemented throughout all of the conglomerate's subsidiaries. The book, however, will continue to serve as a means of spreading his philosophy within the company, and Koch's hope is that it will continue to improve business practices and create value for his companies, as well as for society at large.

The principles of Koch's MBM are taught to students, educators, community leaders and government officials by the Market-Based Management Institute, an educational non-profit, through their partnership with the Wichita State University (WSU).

== Influences ==
Koch credits two books with helping his intellectual formation: F.A. Harper's Why Wages Rise and Ludwig von Mises' Human Action. He also credits several thinkers in his book with influencing his own thinking; most notably: W. Edwards Deming, Michael Polanyi, and his father, Fred C. Koch.

After being unable to find contracts in the U.S., his father had spent time developing petroleum cracking plants in the Soviet Union in the 1920s under the communist regime of Joseph Stalin. He came back from his experience with great contempt for the totalitarian regime, having found the USSR to be "a land of hunger, misery, and terror."

== Overview ==
Koch describes himself as a scientist and uses his self-proclaimed vast knowledge of wide-ranging topics such as history, politics, government, economics, psychology, human action and technology by demonstrating the ways that each affects business management, decision making, and profitability.

The publisher lists the five dimensions of MBM, each rooted in what it calls "the Science of Human Action":

1. Vision – Determining where and how the organization can create the greatest long-term value
2. Virtue and Talents – Helping ensure that people with the right values, skills and capabilities are hired, retained and developed
3. Knowledge Processes – Creating, acquiring, sharing and applying relevant knowledge, and measuring and tracking profitability
4. Decision Rights – Ensuring the right people are in the right roles with the right authority to make decisions and holding them accountable
5. Incentives – Rewarding people according to the value they create for the organization

In addition to describing the principles of MBM, Koch also gives an inside look into some of the important decisions that Koch Industries has made, and analysis of its successes and failures.

The book itself is not so much a how-to on running a business, but rather a philosophical treatise on effective management practices; "a way of thinking—of looking at the world and making decisions based on specific principles." One Forbes magazine reviewer noted that, "Readers expecting a recipe book for business success will be disappointed, but those of a more philosophical bent will find Koch's observations fascinating."
