= Julia Koch =

American socialite and philanthropist (born 1962)

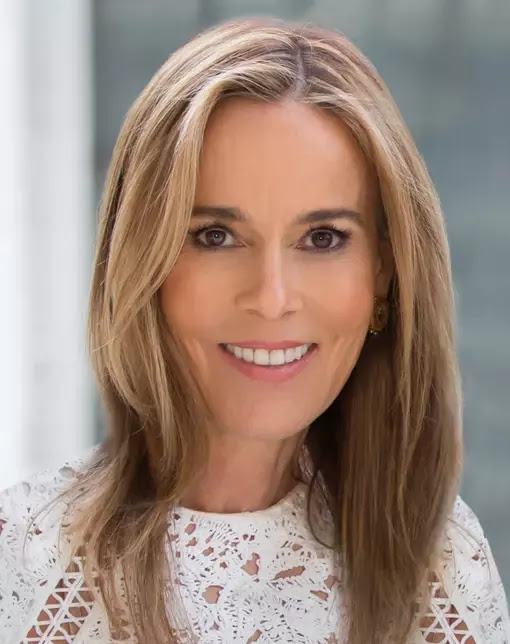
- Koch in 2017
- Born: Julia Margaret Flesher; April 12, 1962 (age 64); Des Moines, Iowa, U.S.
- Education: University of Central Arkansas
- Occupations: Socialite; philanthropist
- Title: President of David H. Koch Foundation
- Spouse: David Koch (m. 1996; died 2019)
- Children: 3
- Website: juliakoch.com

Julia Margaret Flesher Koch (born April 12, 1962) is an American socialite and philanthropist who is one of the richest women in the world. As of August 2026, her fortune was estimated at $81.2 billion. She inherited her fortune from her husband, David Koch, who died in 2019.

== Life ==
Julia Margaret Flesher was born in Des Moines, Iowa, on April 12, 1962. Her family came from a farming background, but when she was born, her parents, Margaret and Frederic Flesher, owned a furniture store called Flesher's. She spent her early childhood in Indianola, Iowa, then when she was eight years old her family moved to Conway, Arkansas, where her parents started a clothing store called Peggy Frederic's, which she considered "a beautiful, beautiful shop". By 1998, her mother still lived in Conway but her father had moved back to Indianola.

After graduating from the University of Central Arkansas and working as a model, Flesher moved to New York City in 1984, where she worked as fashion designer Adolfo's assistant and did fittings for Nancy Reagan.

She met David Koch on a blind date in January 1991, although they did not continue dating at the time. She later described her reaction: "I'm glad I met that man because now I know I never want to go out with him". However, the two met again at a party later that year and started dating. She stopped working in 1993, and they got married in May 1996 at David Koch's house on Meadow Lane in Southampton.

In December 1997, she made what the New York Times called her "New York society debut" at the Met Gala. She was co-chairwoman of the gala that year, along with Anna Wintour and Patrick McCarthy. McCarthy said she was "one of those people who occur in New York every few years...she's beautiful, she loves fashion, she knows how to entertain, she's married to an extraordinarily rich man."

Julia and David Koch had three children, David Jr., Mary Julia and John. Mary Julia is associate opinion editor at The Wall Street Journal.

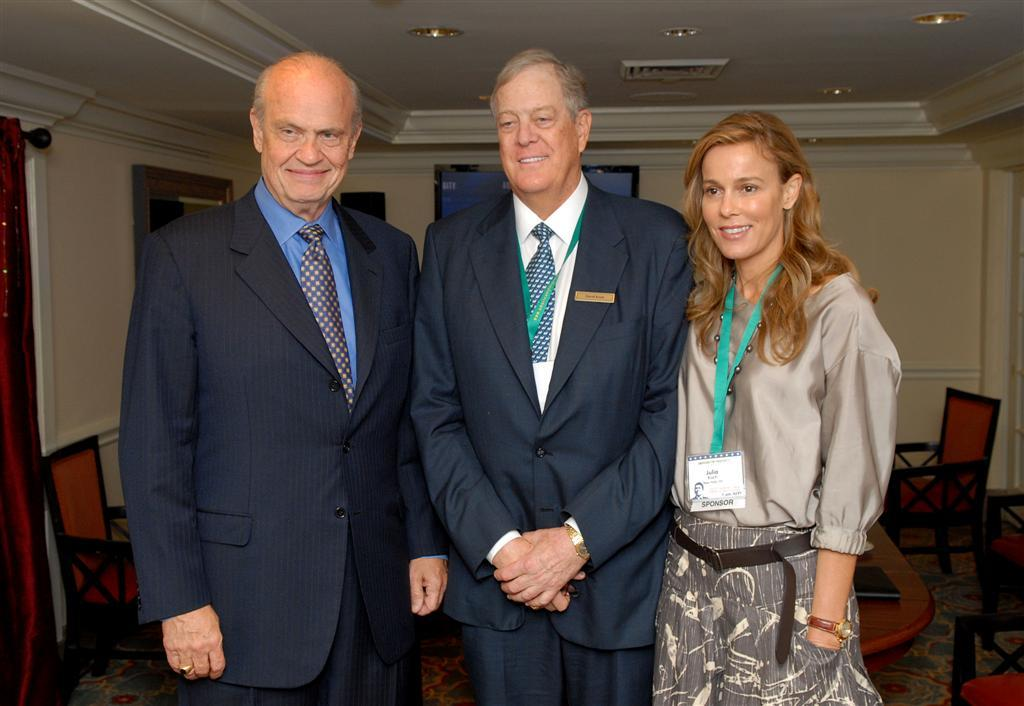
Fred Thompson (left), David Koch (center), and Julia Koch in 2007

Julia and David Koch spent years living in an apartment at 1040 Fifth Avenue, but in 2004 they moved to an 18-room duplex at 740 Park Avenue. According to 740 Park: The Story of the World's Richest Apartment Building, David Koch bought the apartment for about $17 million from the Japanese government, which previously used it to house their permanent representative to the United Nations. In 2018, the couple also bought an eight-bedroom townhouse in Manhattan from investor Joseph Chetrit for $40.25 million.

David Koch died in August 2019, and Julia Koch and their three children inherited 42% of Koch Industries. As a result, she was listed by Bloomberg as the richest woman in the world and was included on Forbes' list of the 10 richest women in the world in 2020.

In 2022, Koch put the apartment at 740 Park Avenue on the market; a spokesperson said that she wanted to sell it because she was spending more time at houses in Southampton and Palm Beach.

Koch is on the board of directors of Koch Industries. She tends not to seek public attention.

In June 2024, she and her family bought a 15% interest in BSE Global, the owner of the Brooklyn Nets, New York Liberty and Barclays Center, for an estimated $900 million. In October 2025, they bought a 10% interest in the New York Giants football team, an investment that valued the team at $10 billion.

== Philanthropy ==
Koch is president of the David H. Koch Foundation, which says it has given over $200 million to causes related to science and medical research, education and the arts as of 2022. She also established the Julia Koch Family Foundation, which donates to healthcare, educational and cultural organizations. Between 2007 and 2017, Koch and her spouse donated an average of $63 million annually, including donations to the arts and medical research.

During her husband's lifetime, they donated $1.2 billion to various causes such as the Lincoln Center, the Metropolitan Museum of Art, the Smithsonian Museum of Natural History, the Memorial Sloan Kettering Cancer Center and the NewYork-Presbyterian Hospital.

In 2020 the David H. Koch fund donated about $1 million to Duke University, in 2021 it donated about $1 million to Columbia University, and around 2023 it gave $5 million to the Cox Science Center and Aquarium in Palm Beach, Florida. From David Koch's death to the beginning of 2023, the fund did not receive any additional revenue.

In 2012, Koch made a $10 million gift to the Mount Sinai Medical Center in New York City, creating the David H. and Julia Koch Research Program in Food Allergy Therapeutics within its Jaffe Food Allergy Institute. In 2016, she donated $10 million to establish the David & Julia Koch research clinic for allergy and asthma at the Lucile Packard Children's Hospital at Stanford University.

Koch has also given to LSA Family Health Services and NYU Langone, establishing the Julia Koch Endowed Scholarship. Roy I. Davidovitch is the current Julia Koch Associate Professor of Orthopedic Surgery and director of NYU Langone's Hip Center.

In 2024, she donated $75 million to NYU Langone through the Julia Koch Family Foundation for the construction of the Julia Koch Family Ambulatory Care Center, a medical office tower in West Palm Beach, Florida.

Koch is a member of Memorial Sloan Kettering Cancer Center's Board of Trustees, the Metropolitan Museum of Art’s Board of Trustees, and the Venetian Heritage Foundation's Board of Directors.

She was formerly on the board of directors of the School of American Ballet.
