= Forbes 400 =

Annual list of wealthiest Americans

400 Richest Americans
- List of 400 US citizens, ranked in order of net worth

Publication details
- Publisher: Whale Media Investments; Forbes family
- Publication: Forbes
- First published: 1982 by Malcolm Forbes
- Latest publication: September 2026

Published list details (September 2022)
- Wealthiest: Elon Musk
- Net worth (1st): US$251 billion
- Entry point: ▲US$2.9 billion
- Total list net worth value: ▲US$4.5 trillion
- Average net worth: US$11.25 billion (approx)

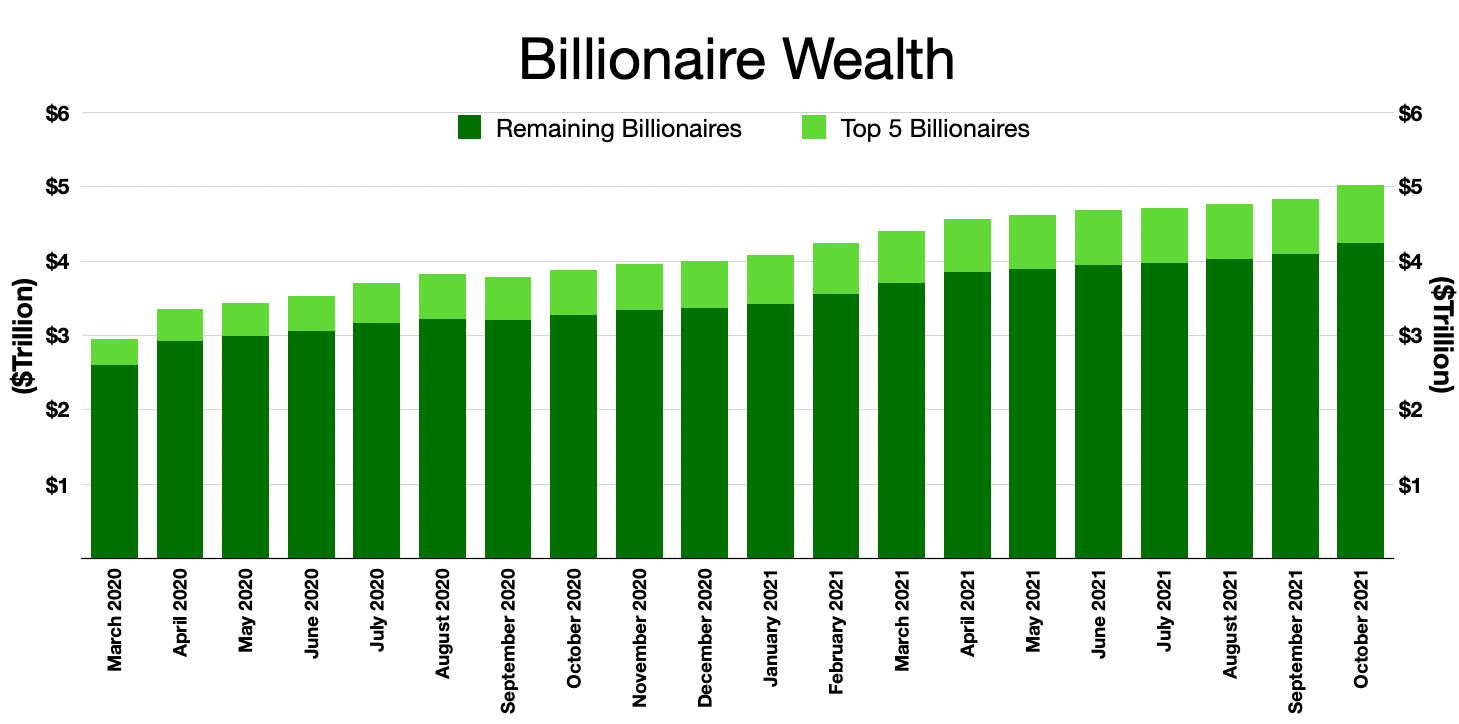
Billionaire wealth

The Forbes 400 or 400 Richest Americans is a list published by Forbes magazine of the wealthiest 400 American citizens who own assets in the U.S., ranked by net worth. The 400 was started by Malcolm Forbes in 1982 and the list is published annually around September. Peter W. Bernstein and Annalyn Swan describe the Forbes 400 as capturing "a period of extraordinary individual and entrepreneurial energy, a time unlike the extended postwar years, from 1945 to 1982, when American society emphasized the power of corporations." Bernstein and Swan also describe it as representing "a powerful argument – and sometimes a dream – about the social value of wealth in contemporary America."

Since 2014, Forbes has published a "self-made score" alongside the list, indicating the degree to which each Forbes 400 member is responsible for their own wealth.

== Criteria ==
The Forbes 400 is a report of who has the most wealth in the United States. They annually create a list of the richest people in America to exhibit the shape of the economy. The magazine displays the story of someone's rise to fame, their company, age, industrial residence, and education. The list portrays the financial shift of trends, leadership positions, and growing philanthropy intentions.

== History ==
=== First list (1982) ===
In the first Forbes 400 list, there were only 13 billionaires, and a net worth of US$75 million secured a spot on the list. The 1982 list represented 2.8% of the Gross Domestic Product of the United States. The 1982 Forbes 400 had 22.8% of the list composed of oil fortunes, with 15.3% from manufacturing, 9% from finance and only 3% from technology-driven fortunes. The state of New York had the most representation on the list with 77 members, followed by California with 48.

=== 2000 ===
In the year 2000, Forbes 400 saw the highest percent of the gross domestic product represented by the list at 12.2% driven by the internet boom.

=== 2021 ===
By 2021, calculated using stock prices from September 3, 2021, the minimum net worth to make the Forbes 400 was $2.9 billion; the top billionaire on the list, Jeff Bezos, was worth over $200 billion; and the collective fortunes of the 400 reached $4.5 trillion. In the 39 years since the first list, the minimum net worth to make the list had increased over 38-fold, or 3866% (from $75 million to $2.9 billion), while basic consumer price inflation had risen less than 300% (or less than 3-fold).

=== Controversies ===
In April 2018, an ex-Forbes reporter Jonathan Greenberg alleged that Donald Trump had inflated his actual wealth in order to be included on the Forbes 400 listing. Greenberg provided original audio recordings of his 1984 exchange with "John Barron", one of the pseudonyms used by Donald Trump, and eventually included Trump at the end of the Forbes 400 list at $100 million, one fifth of the $500 million which "Barron" was claiming as Donald Trump's net worth. This figure was later corrected and, following civil proceedings years later, Trump admitted the name was fabricated.

== Self-made score ==
Forbes' self-made score rates each member of the list on a scale of 1 to 10. A score of 1 is given to those who inherited their fortune and have not worked to increase or manage it. A score of 10 is given to those who both grew up poor and overcame significant obstacles. Forbes characterizes members with a rating of 6 or above as "self-made". For the 2022 edition, this places slightly over two-thirds of the members in the self-made category.

The self-made score has been invoked in discussions about inherited wealth, economic mobility, and related subjects, with some commentators supporting Forbes' characterization of the list's members, and others challenging it. In September 2012, the Institute for Policy Studies claimed that "over 60 percent" of the Forbes richest 400 Americans "grew up in substantial privilege". They note that wealthy parents can bestow their children with privileges other than a large inheritance, such as paying for expensive tuition. In contrast, the Chicago Booth endorses the claim that most of the Forbes 400 are self-made, while emphasizing that the list's share of entrepreneurs has increased from 40% in 1982 to 69% in 2014.

== Demographics ==
A few articles draw on the Forbes 400 to test an evolutionary hypothesis called the Trivers–Willard hypothesis. This hypothesis predicts that parents of high socioeconomic status produce more male offspring than parents of lower socioeconomic status. Whereas a 2009 study using data on the Forbes 400 shows a strong effect for U.S. billionaires that is consistent with the Trivers–Willard hypothesis, a 2013 study shows some caveats: First, the result is only consistent for male, but not female, billionaires. Second, it can only be found among heirs and not self-made billionaires.

This has to do with the timing of wealth accumulation: some self-made billionaires had their children before they were rich, but heirs, by definition, were rich before ever becoming parents (see also). Third, the size of the effect was largely overestimated, given that the male offspring of billionaires as compared to female offspring is easier to find on the Web: Women sometimes change their last name upon marriage which makes some harder to find. Therefore, earlier reports on the male bias among billionaire offspring were partially an artifact of sample selection.

In 2010, a Business Insider ethnic-demographic breakdown of the Forbes 400 richest Americans found three gay people, four Asian Indians, six (non-Indian) Asians, and 34 women on the list. American Jews made up as many as 30% of the richest 100, and (in 2009) 139 of the Forbes 400. In 2017, just two African Americans made the Forbes 400: media proprietor Oprah Winfrey and tech investor Robert Smith; only five of the Forbes 400 have Latino backgrounds.

== See also ==
- 40 Under 40 (Fortune magazine)
- Sunday Times Rich List
- List of Americans by net worth
- List of richest Americans in history
