= Charles Koch =

American businessman and philanthropist (born 1935)

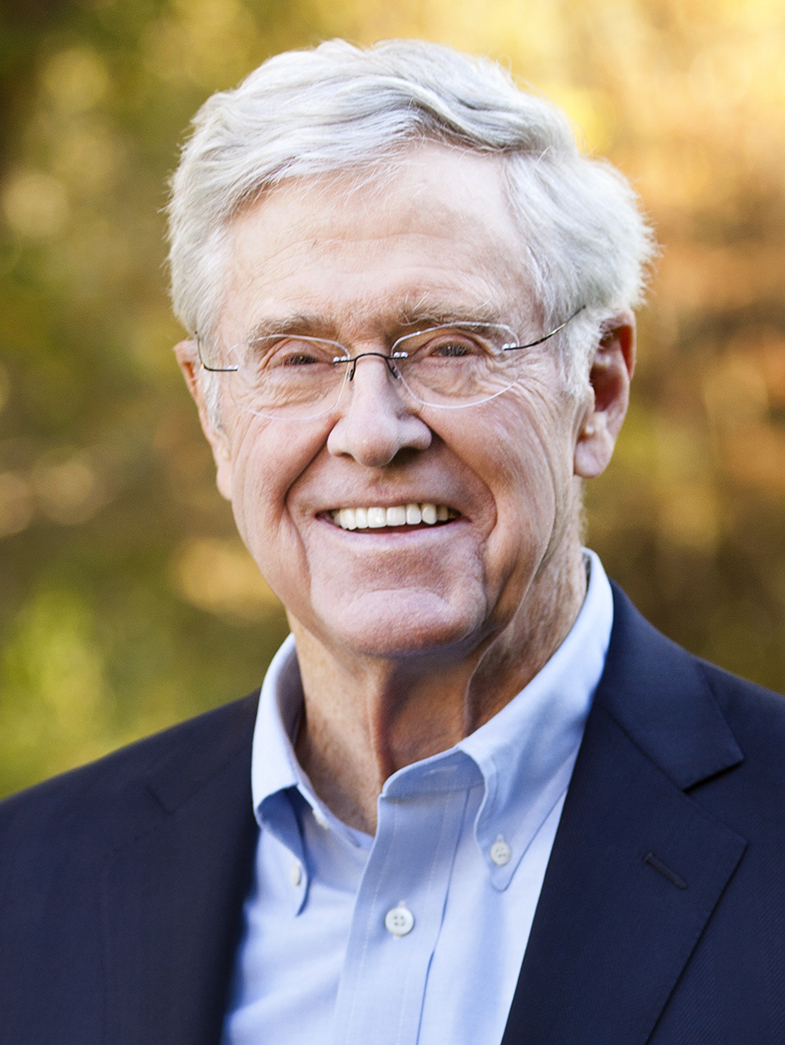
- Koch in 2019
- Born: Charles de Ganahl Koch; November 1, 1935 (age 91); Wichita, Kansas, U.S.
- Education: Massachusetts Institute of Technology (BS, MS)
- Occupations: Businessman; engineer; philanthropist
- Employer: Koch Industries
- Title: Chairman and CEO of Koch Industries
- Political party: Libertarian
- Spouse: Liz Koch (m. 1972)
- Children: Chase; Elizabeth
- Father: Fred C. Koch
- Relatives: Frederick R. Koch (brother); David Koch (brother); Bill Koch (brother)

Charles de Ganahl Koch (/koʊk/ KOHK; born November 1, 1935) is an American businessman, engineer, and philanthropist. As of May 2025, he is ranked as the 22nd richest man in the world on the Bloomberg Billionaires Index, with an estimated net worth of US$71.4 billion. Koch has been co-owner, chairman, and chief executive officer of Koch Industries since 1967, while his late brother David Koch was executive vice president. Charles and David each owned 42% of the conglomerate. The brothers inherited the business from their father, Fred C. Koch, then expanded the business. Koch Industries is the largest privately held company by revenue in the United States, according to Forbes.

Koch supports a number of libertarian think tanks, including the Institute for Humane Studies, the Cato Institute, the Ayn Rand Institute, and the Mercatus Center at George Mason University. He also contributes to the Republican Party and candidates, and to libertarian groups, and various charitable and cultural institutions. He co-founded the Washington, D.C.–based Cato Institute. Along with his brother, Koch has been an important funder of think tanks that lobby to oppose environmental regulation. Koch has published four books detailing his business philosophy: Market Based Management (2006), The Science of Success (2007), Good Profit (2015), and Believe in People (2020).

== Early life and education ==
Koch was born and lives in Wichita, Kansas, one of four sons of Clementine Mary (née Robinson) and Fred Chase Koch. Koch's grandfather, Harry Koch, was a Dutch immigrant who settled in West Texas, founded the Quanah Tribune-Chief newspaper and was a founding shareholder of Quanah, Acme and Pacific Railway. Among his maternal great-great-grandparents were William Ingraham Kip, an Episcopal bishop, and Elizabeth Clementine Stedman, a writer.

In a 2016 interview, Koch said that as a child he did not live a privileged lifestyle despite growing up in a wealthy family. After attending several private high schools, Koch was educated at the Massachusetts Institute of Technology. He is a member of the Beta Theta Pi fraternity. He received a Bachelor of Science (B.S.) in general engineering in 1957, a Master of Science (M.S.) in nuclear engineering in 1958, and a second M.S. in chemical engineering in 1959. His focus was on ways to refine oil.

After college, Koch started work at Arthur D. Little, Inc.

== Career ==
In 1961 he moved back to Wichita to join his father's business, Rock Island Oil & Refining Company (now known as Koch Industries). In 1967, he became president of the business, which was then a medium-sized oil firm. In the same year, he renamed the firm Koch Industries in honor of his father. Charles's brothers Frederick and Bill inherited stock in Koch Industries. In June 1983, after a legal and boardroom battle, the stakes of Frederick and Bill were bought out for $1.1 billion and Charles and his younger brother David became majority owners in the company. Despite the settlement, legal disputes continued until May 2001. CBS News reported that Koch Industries settled for $25 million.

In 2006, Koch Industries generated $90 billion in revenue, a growth of 2000 times over, which represents an annual compounded return of 18%. As of 2014, Koch was worth approximately US$41.3 billion (in 2013 $36 billion) according to the Forbes 400 list. Koch would routinely work 12-hour days at the office (and then spent more time working at home), weekends, and expected executives at Koch Industries to work weekends as well.

Koch has been a director of INTRUST Financial Corp. since 1982 and director of Koch Industries Inc. since 1982. He is director of resin and fiber company Invista and director of Georgia-Pacific LLC, paper and pulp products. Koch founded or helped found several organizations, including the Cato Institute, the Institute for Humane Studies and the Mercatus Center at George Mason University, the Bill of Rights Institute, and the Market-Based Management Institute. He is a member of the Mont Pelerin Society.

== Political and economic views ==
Charles Koch describes himself as a classical liberal and has formerly identified as a libertarian. He is opposed to corporate welfare and told the National Journal, "My overall concept is to minimize the role of government and to maximize the role of private economy and to maximize personal freedoms." He has expressed concern about too much government regulation in the U.S., stating, "We could be facing the greatest loss of liberty and prosperity since the 1930s." In addition, he has warned that drastic government overspending and a decline of the free enterprise system will prove detrimental to long-term social and economic prosperity.

According to Stephen Moore, influences on Koch include Alexis de Tocqueville, Adam Smith, Michael Polanyi, Joseph Schumpeter, Julian Simon, Paul Johnson, Thomas Sowell, Charles Murray, Leonard Read, and F. A. Harper. The presidents he most admires include George Washington, Grover Cleveland, and Calvin Coolidge. In an interview with the American Journal of Business, Koch said he owes "a huge debt of gratitude to the giants who created the Austrian School [of economics]. They developed principles that enabled me to gain an understanding of how the world works, and these ideas were a catalyst in the development of Market-Based Management." In particular, he expresses admiration for Ludwig von Mises' book Human Action, as well as the writings of Friedrich Hayek. Koch said "the short-term infatuation with quarterly earnings on Wall Street restricts the earnings potential of Fortune 500 publicly traded firms." He also considers public firms to be "feeding grounds for lawyers and lawsuits," with regulations like Sarbanes–Oxley only increasing the earnings potential of privately held companies.

Koch disdains "big government" and the "political class." He believes billionaires Warren Buffett and George Soros, who fund organizations with different ideologies, "simply haven't been sufficiently exposed to the ideas of liberty." Koch claimed "prosperity is under attack" by the Obama administration and sought to warn "of policies that threaten to erode our economic freedom and transfer vast sums of money to the state."

Koch supports cannabis legalization. As of 2021, Koch is "actively funding efforts to end federal marijuana prohibition." He cited his belief in individual liberty and economic freedom as his reasons for doing so.

In an April 2011 Wall Street Journal op-ed, Koch wrote:

Government spending on business only aggravates the problem. Too many businesses have successfully lobbied for special favors and treatment by seeking mandates for their products, subsidies (in the form of cash payments from the government), and regulations and tariffs to keep more efficient competitors at bay. Crony capitalism is much easier than competing in an open market. But it erodes our overall standard of living and stifles entrepreneurs by rewarding the politically favored rather than those who provide what consumers want.

His opposition to corporate welfare includes lobbying for an end to ethanol subsidies. He has maintained his commitment to free-market principles even though Koch Industries is a major ethanol producer. He is quoted as saying, "The first thing we've got to get rid of is business welfare and entitlements."

In an April 2014 Wall Street Journal op-ed, Koch wrote, "the fundamental concepts of dignity, respect, equality before the law and personal freedom are under attack by the nation's own government." He criticized the Obama administration, saying that its "central belief and fatal conceit" is that people are not capable of running their own lives. "This is the essence of big government and collectivism," he wrote. He cited the "current healthcare debacle" as an example of disastrous government control. He complained that he had been the victim of "character assassination."

=== Market-based management ===
Koch's business philosophy, "market-based management" (MBM), is described in his 2007 book The Science of Success. In an interview with the Wichita Eagle, he said that he was motivated to write the book by Koch Industries' 2004 acquisition of Invista so he could give new employees a "comprehensive picture" of MBM. According to the website of the Market-Based Management Institute, which Koch founded in 2005, MBM is "based on rules of just conduct, economic thinking, and sound mental models", harnessing the dispersed knowledge of employees just as markets harness knowledge in society. "It is organized in and interpreted through five dimensions: vision, virtue and talents, decision rights, incentives, and knowledge processes." In the book, Koch attempts to apply Friedrich Hayek's spontaneous order theory and Austrian entrepreneurial theory, such as that of Mises and Israel Kirzner, to organizational management.

== Political activities ==
=== Libertarianism ===
Koch funds and supports libertarian and free-enterprise policy and advocacy organizations. Two works that have been especially influential upon Koch's philosophy are Ludwig Von Mises' Human Action and F. A. Harper's Why Wages Rise. After reading Harper's book, Koch became involved with Harper's Institute for Humane Studies, of which he became a principal supporter. He has been on the board of IHS since 1966. Since the 1980s, IHS has been increasingly interested in aiding the careers of aspiring educators, journalists, and policy professionals with an interest in classical liberal thought. Among other projects, the IHS runs the Charles G. Koch Summer Fellow Program, which "has supported more than 900 students during eight-week internships at public policy organizations, both in D.C. and around the country." In addition, almost 200 institutions of higher education in the U.S. are funded by the Charles G. Koch Foundation. What all the Koch-funded programs have in common is an interest in studying free societies with an eye to understanding the mechanisms behind the assumption that economic freedom benefits humanity.

In 1977 he co-founded the Cato Institute with Edward H. Crane and Murray Rothbard.

In 2008, Koch was included in Businessweek's list of top 50 American givers. Between 2004 and 2008, Koch gave $246 million, focusing on "libertarian causes, giving money for academic and public policy research and social welfare." Koch was awarded an Honorary Doctorate from George Mason University in recognition of his financial support "through scholarships, faculty recruitment, and research grants".

In June 2019, the Charles Koch Foundation announced the foundation of anti-war think tank Quincy Institute for Responsible Statecraft, cosponsored by George Soros' Open Society Foundations. He is a board member at the Mercatus Center, a market-oriented research think tank at George Mason University.

Koch's philanthropic activities have focused on research, policy, and educational projects intended to advance free-market views. He has underwritten scholarships and financed the research of economists James Buchanan and Friedrich Hayek. Koch has given money to support public policy research focused on "developing voluntary, market-based solutions to social problems." He has given to the Bill of Rights Institute. He has also given to the Youth Entrepreneurs, an organization that teaches business skills to at-risk youth in Kansas schools.

=== Climate change ===
Koch acknowledges anthropogenic climate change, but opposes top-down government regulation as a solution. Rather, he favors bottom-up technological innovation from private entities, saying they can lower emissions while improving efficiency and lowering costs.

He has heavily funded organizations and politicians who deny or downplay climate change and environmental regulations that observers say is due to his business interests in the fossil fuel industry. A leaked 2012 fundraising plan indicated that the Charles G. Koch Charitable Foundation contributed $25,000 in 2011 to the Heartland Institute, an American conservative and libertarian public policy think tank known for climate change denial. Koch has also supported the Berkeley Earth Surface Temperature project, a scientific effort to compile an open database of the Earth's surface temperature records.

The Pacific Legal Foundation, funded by Koch, has litigated against increased environmental regulation. The American Enterprise Institute received $2.1 million over two decades from the Charles Koch Foundation for its climate change denialist activities. Together with ExxonMobil's, Koch's wealth was also supplied to the Independent Institute, another think-tank known for lobby in favor of climate change denial. Koch has also given money to the American Institute for Economic Research, a right-wing libertarian think tank which also lobbies against climate science. Koch-backed Americans for Prosperity has fought efforts by the Environmental Protection Agency to regulate carbon emissions. The Republican Trump administration adopted environmental policies similar to those advocated for by Koch-funded groups. Koch has backed the Competitive Enterprise Institute and the CO_{2} Coalition, both of which also supported former President Donald Trump's 2017 withdrawal from the Paris climate agreement.

In 2022, Koch was named one of the US' top 'climate villains' by The Guardian. As of 2023, his company has received awards from the EPA for three consecutive years.

=== COVID-19 pandemic ===
Koch has also given money to the American Institute for Economic Research, the right-wing libertarian think tank which sponsored the Great Barrington Declaration, which was described by the American Public Health Association and other public-health groups as "not grounded in science" and "dangerous". His Charles Koch Foundation gave $68,100 in 2018. The declaration's sponsor employed Emergent Order, a public relations firm which itself receives funding from Koch's Foundation, registered as $1.4 million between 2014 and 2019.

=== Political campaigns ===
Koch supported his brother's candidacy for vice president on the Libertarian Party ticket in 1980. After the bid, Koch told a reporter that conventional politics "tends to be a nasty, corrupting business ... I'm interested in advancing libertarian ideas". In addition to funding think tanks, Charles and David supported libertarian academics and Koch funds the Charles G. Koch Summer Fellow Program through the Institute for Humane Studies which recruits and mentors young libertarians. Koch also organizes twice yearly meetings of Republican donors.

Koch supported the Tea Party movement. "The way it's grown, the passion, and the intensity, was beyond what I had anticipated," he told an interviewer. He funded groups opposed to Barack Obama's administration.

In 2011, Koch was awarded the William E. Simon Prize for Philanthropic Leadership. The award honors "the ideals and principles which guided William E. Simon's giving, including personal responsibility, resourcefulness, volunteerism, scholarship, individual freedom, faith in God, and helping people to help themselves."

In July 2015 Charles Koch and his brother were praised by President Obama and Anthony Van Jones for their bipartisan efforts to reform the criminal justice system. For roughly a decade Koch has been advocating for several reforms within the prison system, including the reduction of recidivist criminals, easing the employment process for rehabilitated persons, and the defense of private property from asset forfeiture. Aligning with groups such as the ACLU, the Center for American Progress, Families Against Mandatory Minimums, the Coalition for Public Safety, and the MacArthur Foundation, Koch believes the current system has unfairly targeted low-income and minority communities all while wasting substantial government resources.

In February 2016, Koch penned an opinion piece in The Washington Post, where he said he agreed with presidential candidate Bernie Sanders about the unfairness of corporate welfare and mass incarceration in the United States.

In 2020, Koch's Koch Industries donated $2.8 million to Republican Party causes through a political action committee. Koch Industries donated $221,000 to Democratic Party causes.

On November 13, 2020, reports in several media published statements made during an interview with The Wall Street Journal by Koch about his regret that he had contributed significantly to the development of hyper-partisanship in the United States. Koch added that he intended to work with Democrats, moderate Republicans, and liberals to facilitate bipartisanship.

== Philanthropy ==
=== Sports and culture ===
In 2002, Koch Industries donated $6 million to renovate the Wichita State University basketball arena. The gift was given in honor of Koch, and the arena was subsequently renamed the Charles Koch Arena. Koch has continued to be a major donor to both the university and its athletic program. In December 2014, Koch Industries and the Koch family foundation donated $11.25 million to the university, the largest one-time gift in school history, with $4.5 million of that going toward a plan to renovate the arena and expand the athletic program's academic support center. Several months later, when men's basketball head coach Gregg Marshall was considering an offer to become head coach at the University of Alabama, Koch led a group of local business leaders and WSU boosters that raised Marshall's annual salary from $1.85 million to $3 million and kept him at the school. The raise was seen as an unprecedented move for a school outside the Power Five conferences, and likely to make Marshall among the 10 highest-paid college basketball coaches.

== Personal life ==
Koch has been married to his wife Liz since 1972. He has two children, Chase Koch and Elizabeth Koch. Charles and his three brothers have all suffered from prostate cancer. According to the Wichita Eagle, Koch "rarely grants media interviews and prefers to keep a low profile". Time magazine included Charles and David Koch among the most influential people of 2011. According to the magazine, the list includes "activists, reformers and researchers, heads of state and captains of industry." The article describes the brothers' commitment to free-market principles, the growth and development of their business, and their support for Tea Party organizations and political candidates. Koch lives in Wichita, Kansas, and has homes in Indian Wells, California, and Aspen, Colorado. Koch is irreligious.

== Awards ==
Koch has received various awards and honors, including:

- Honorary Doctor of Science, from George Mason University, for his continued support of the economics program at GMU
- Honorary Doctor of Commerce from Washburn University
- Honorary Doctor of Laws from Babson College
- The 2011 Defender of Justice award from the National Association of Criminal Defense Lawyers
- In 2022, Ellis Island Honors Society presented Charles Koch with the Ellis Island Medal of Honor.
- In 2025, Koch received the Milton Friedman Prize for Advancing Liberty.

== See also ==
- Charles Koch Institute
- The World's Billionaires
- Quincy Institute for Responsible Statecraft
- Koch Brothers Exposed (2012)
