= Elizabeth Koch (publisher) =

American publisher and writer (born 1976)

Elizabeth Robinson Koch
- Born: 1976 (age 49–50); Wichita, Kansas, U.S.
- Education: Princeton University (BA); Syracuse University (MFA)
- Occupation: Nonprofit founder
- Parents: Charles Koch (father); Liz Koch (mother)
- Relatives: Chase Koch (brother)

Elizabeth Robinson Koch (/koʊk/ KOHK; born 1976) is an American publisher, writer, and nonprofit founder. The daughter of billionaire businessman Charles Koch, she founded the publishing company Catapult in 2015. Koch has founded and donated to multiple organizations involved in the research and popular study of consciousness, self-perception, and psychedelic therapy.

== Early life and education ==
Koch is the daughter of the American businessman Charles Koch and Liz Koch. She has a brother, Chase Koch. Koch grew up in Wichita, Kansas, and is a graduate of Wichita Collegiate School. She earned a B.A. in English literature from Princeton University and an M.F.A. in creative writing from Syracuse University.

== Career ==
Koch has worked in journalism, book editing, and periodicals, including at Opium Magazine. She co-founded the Literary Death Match reading series and Black Balloon Publishing. Koch was an executive producer for the films Beasts of No Nation (2015) and Harriet (2019).

=== Catapult ===
In 2015, Koch and Andy Hunter launched Catapult, a publishing venture that combined book publishing, an online magazine, and writing classes. Hunter was publisher and Koch was CEO.

In 2016, Catapult and Counterpoint Press finalized a merger agreement that included the Counterpoint and Soft Skull Press imprints. Publishers Weekly later described the arrangement as bringing Counterpoint and Soft Skull under Catapult.

Hunter stepped down as publisher of Catapult, Counterpoint, and Soft Skull Press in February 2022. In 2023, Catapult announced that it would close its online magazine and writing classes program to focus on book publishing.

The book-publishing operation continued as Catapult Book Group, whose imprints include Catapult, Counterpoint Press, Soft Skull Press, and Hawthorne Books.

In October 2026, it was reported that the Catapult Book Group would be sold and that operations would shut down shortly thereafter.

=== Nonprofit work ===
In 2014, Koch founded Tiny Blue Dot Foundation, a neuroscience research foundation focused on consciousness and self-perception. In 2018, she founded Unlikely Collaborators, a nonprofit focused on self-investigation.

In 2018, Koch underwent MDMA-assisted therapy and later became a donor to the Multidisciplinary Association for Psychedelic Studies.

== Personal life ==
Koch married Jason Kakoyiannis in 2012. They divorced in 2023. She has stated that she is "apolitical".
