= Don Lavoie =

American economist (1951–2001)

- Born: April 4, 1951
- Died: November 6, 2001 (aged 50)

Academic background
- Education: Worcester Polytechnic Institute; New York University

Academic work
- School or tradition: Austrian School

Donald Charles Lavoie (April 4, 1951 – November 6, 2001) was an American economist of the Austrian School. He was influenced by Friedrich Hayek, Hans-Georg Gadamer, Michael Polanyi and Ludwig Lachmann. He wrote two books on the problem of economic calculation. His first book on this subject was Rivalry and Central Planning (Cambridge University Press 1985). This book stressed the importance of the process of competitive rivalry in markets. His second book was National Economic Planning: What Is Left? (Cambridge, Massachusetts: Ballinger Publishing Company, 1985). This book dealt with the problem of non-comprehensive planning.

== Early life and education ==
Lavoie earned a BS in computer science in 1973 from Worcester Polytechnic Institute. He then earned a PhD in economics in 1981 from New York University under Israel Kirzner. His thesis was entitled Rivalry and central planning: a re-examination of the debate over economic calculation under socialism.

== Career ==
Don Lavoie joined the faculty of the economics department of George Mason University as an assistant professor in 1981. He was co-founder of the interdisciplinary unit known as the Program on Social & Organizational Learning at George Mason University.

As a young professor, he worked on the philosophy and practice of electronically mediated discourse. He knew the importance for organizations of new ways of cultivating interactive learning environments (groupware and hypertext software environments) in order to enhance communicative processes. He showed the fundamental nature of social learning processes, whether in market exchanges, in verbal conversations, or in hypertext-based dialogue.

As a scholar, he studied the philosophy of the social sciences (especially the application of hermeneutics to economics) and Comparative economic systems (especially Marxian theories of socialism). Along with Richard Ebeling and others, Lavoie pioneered the attempt to merge Austrian Economics with philosophical hermeneutics in the late 1980s, and in particular with the hermeneutics of Hans-Georg Gadamer. His effort drew criticism from several members of the Austrian School associated with the Mises Institute, especially Murray Rothbard and Hans-Hermann Hoppe.

In the book Culture and Enterprise: The Development, Representation and Morality of Business (New York: Routledge, 2000) written with Emily Chamlee-Wright, they take into account the important role of culture in a nation's economic development.

He also worked at the Cato Institute.

=== Books ===
- Lavoie, Don (1985). Rivalry and central planning: the socialist calculation debate reconsidered. Cambridge: Cambridge University Press. ISBN 0-521-26449-9. OCLC 11113886.
- Lavoie, Don (1985). National economic planning: what is left?. Cambridge, Mass.: Ballinger Pub. Co. ISBN 0-88730-055-3. OCLC 11971952.

=== Students ===
Among his students, there are a number of "contemporary Austrian" economists: Peter Boettke, David Prychitko, Steven Horwitz, Thomas Rustici, Mark Gilbert, Ralph Rector, Emily Chamlee-Wright, Howie Baetjer and Virgil Storr.

== Death and legacy ==
Lavoie was diagnosed with pancreatic cancer in the spring of 2001. He died of a stroke later that year. A conference was held in his honor after his death as well as a book of essays.
