= Richard Fink =

American businessman and academic

- Born: Richard Harold Fink; May 31, 1951 (age 75); New Jersey, U.S.
- Education: Economics
- Alma mater: Rutgers University; University of California, Los Angeles; New York University
- Occupation: Executive vice president Koch Industries
- Employer: Koch Industries
- Board member of: Americans for Prosperity Foundation, Institute for Humane Studies, Mercatus Center at George Mason University

Richard Harold Fink (born May 31, 1951) is an American businessman and academic. He is the former executive vice president of Koch Industries, the second largest privately held company in the U.S.

== Education and academic career ==
Fink received a B.A. in economics from Rutgers University, an M.A. in economics from the University of California, Los Angeles, and a Ph.D. in economics from New York University. Between 1980 and 1986, Fink was on the economics faculty at George Mason University, where he was the founder and director of the Center for Market Processes, which later became the Mercatus Center. Under his leadership, during the 1980s, George Mason was a center of Austrian Economics.

== Relationship with Charles Koch ==
In the late 1970s, Fink met Charles Koch, in Wichita, Kansas, to discuss founding a research center devoted to teaching Austrian economics thought at Rutgers. They planned what became the Mercatus Center in 1999.

== Koch Industries ==
Fink served as an executive vice president of Koch Industries, Inc. He was also chairman and CEO of Koch Companies Public Sector, LLC, which provides legal and government and public affairs services to Koch Industries and its affiliate. He was on the board of directors of Koch Industries Inc., Georgia-Pacific and Flint Hills Resources, LLC.

== Koch Family Foundations ==
Fink was a member of the boards of directors and President of the Charles G. Koch Charitable Foundation and the Claude R. Lambe Charitable Foundation. He was also on the board of the Fred C. and Mary R. Koch Foundation.

== Board memberships ==
Fink served on the board of trustees of the Democratic Leadership Council.

Fink co-founded Citizens for a Sound Economy, where he served as president, and co-founded the Citizens for a Sound Economy Foundation, which is now the Americans for Prosperity Foundation. He also sat on the board of the Institute for Humane Studies, and the Mercatus Center at George Mason University. He previously served on the Consumer Advisory Council of the Federal Reserve Board and the Commission on Privatization.

Fink was a member of the boards of directors of the Charles Koch Foundation, the Claude R. Lambe Charitable Foundation, the Fred C. and Mary R. Koch Foundation, the Institute for Humane Studies, the Market-Based Management Institute, and Americans for Prosperity Foundation.
