= Steven Horwitz =

American economist (1964–2021)

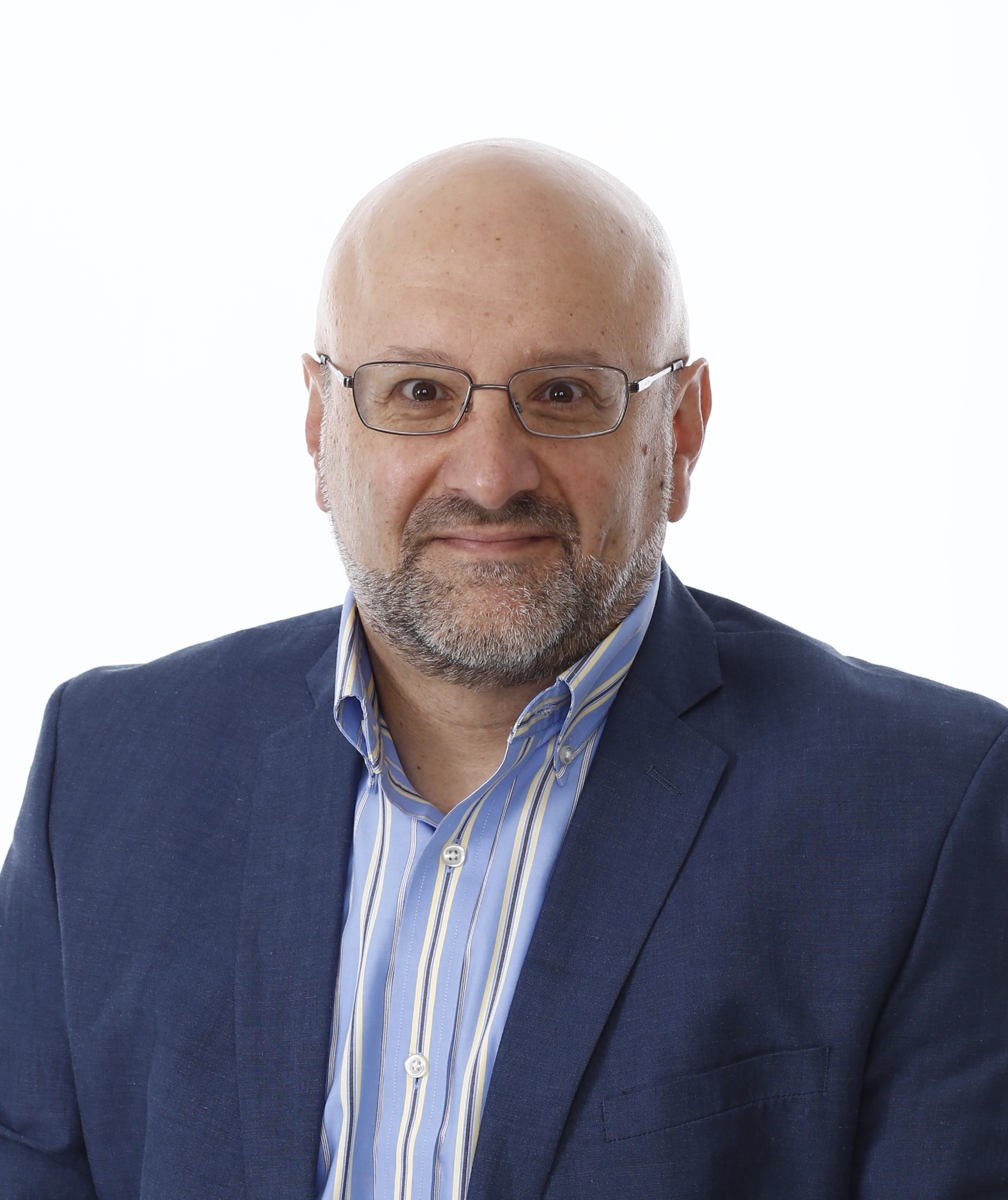
- Horwitz in 2017
- Born: February 7, 1964; Detroit, Michigan, U.S.
- Died: June 27, 2021 (aged 57); Indianapolis, Indiana, U.S.
- Spouse: Sarah Skwire

Academic background
- Education: University of Michigan

Academic work
- School or tradition: Austrian School; Bleeding-heart libertarianism

Steven G. Horwitz (February 7, 1964 – June 27, 2021) was an American economist of the Austrian School. Horwitz was the Distinguished Professor of Free Enterprise in the department of economics in the Miller College of Business at Ball State University in Muncie, Indiana. In 2017, he retired as the Dana Professor of Economics Emeritus at St. Lawrence University.

== Early life and education ==
Horwitz was born in Detroit, Michigan, to Ronald and Carol Horwitz. He was raised in Oak Park, Michigan, and graduated from Berkley High School in Berkley, Michigan, in 1981. He graduated cum laude with an A.B. in economics and philosophy from the University of Michigan in 1985, where he was also active with several libertarian student groups and where he wrote and performed with the Sunday Funnies/Comedy Company sketch comedy group.

He received his M.A. (1987) and Ph.D. (1990) in economics from George Mason University in Fairfax, Virginia. At George Mason, he studied with Don Lavoie (who chaired his dissertation committee), George Selgin, Karen Vaughn, James M. Buchanan, Don Boudreaux, and Richard E. Wagner.

== Professional history ==
In 1989, Horwitz joined the economics department of St. Lawrence University in Canton, New York. In 1993, he was appointed the inaugural Flora Irene Eggleston Chair in Economics. He was promoted to associate professor with tenure in 1995 and to full professor in 2002. In 1999, he was awarded the annual Frank Piskor Lectureship, and in 2003 he was the recipient of the J. Calvin Keene award, which recognizes high standards of personal scholarship, effective teaching and moral concern. In 2007, Horwitz was elected by the faculty to one of six campus-wide Charles A. Dana Professorships.

At St. Lawrence, Horwitz served as the associate dean of the first year from 2001 to 2007, overseeing the university's First Year Program. He consulted with other schools on living-learning programs and on teaching research and communication skills to first-year students. He was also interim director of the Center for Teaching and Learning in 2003–04.

In fall 2017, Horwitz joined the department of economics at Ball State University as distinguished professor of free enterprise. He was also the director of the Institute for the Study of Political Economy.

Horwitz was a long-time faculty member at the summer seminars of the Institute for Humane Studies and the Foundation for Economic Education. In summer 2007, he was a visiting scholar at the Social Philosophy and Policy Center at Bowling Green State University in Bowling Green, Ohio. Horwitz was a senior affiliated scholar of the Mercatus Center at George Mason University in Arlington, Virginia, where he had conducted research on the role of Wal-Mart and the Coast Guard in the response to Hurricane Katrina. He was also a senior fellow of the Fraser Institute in Canada and had been a member of the Mont Pelerin Society since 1996.

Horwitz was the 2020 recipient of the Julian L. Simon Memorial Award from the Competitive Enterprise Institute, honoring his work documenting human progress and the importance of liberal institutions. In 2019, he received the Prometheus Award for the Promotion of Economic Literacy from the Greek think tank KEFiM.

Most of Horwitz's professional work was in the area of monetary theory and macroeconomics from an Austrian school perspective, with his 2000 book Microfoundations and Macroeconomics: An Austrian Perspective best summarizing that work. He had also contributed to Austrian economics and the history of economic thought, as well as the social thought of F. A. Hayek. After that book, he explored the economics and social theory of the family, including his book Hayek's Modern Family: Classical Liberalism and the evolution of Social Institutions. His "Open Letter to My Friends on the Left" in September 2008 was a widely read libertarian analysis of the mortgage crisis and has been translated into five languages. He was a frequent op-ed contributor to major newspapers and appeared on numerous radio shows as well as TV appearances on Stossel, Freedom Watch, and Smerconish on CNN.

Horwitz identified himself as a bleeding-heart libertarian and was a regular contributor to the Bleeding Heart Libertarians weblog. He also contributed to Coordination Problem.

== Personal life ==
Outside of his professional interests, Horwitz was a fan of hockey, especially the Detroit Red Wings, and classic rock, especially Rush. He wrote two scholarly articles on Rush in 2003.

Horwitz was diagnosed with multiple myeloma in 2017. He was public about his treatment and raised funds for multiple myeloma research on social media and in interviews. He died on June 27, 2021.

He was married to Sarah Skwire, a senior fellow and director of communications at Liberty Fund, and they resided in Fishers, Indiana, with her two daughters. He had two children, Andrew and Rachel, from a previous marriage. Horwitz was Jewish.

== Books and monographs ==
- Monetary Evolution, Free Banking, and Economic Order, (Westview Press, 1992) ISBN 0-8133-8514-8.
- 'Of Human Action but not Human Design': Liberalism in the Tradition of the Scottish Enlightenment, 1999 Annual Frank P. Piskor Lecture, (St. Lawrence University, 2000) ASIN: B0006RFQ0G.
- Microfoundations and Macroeconomics: An Austrian Perspective, (Routledge, 2000) ISBN 0-415-19762-7. Co-winner of the 2001 Smith Prize in Austrian Economics for the best contribution to Austrian economics published in the previous three years.
- Hayek's Modern Family: Classical Liberalism and the Evolution of Social Institutions, (Palgrave, 2015) ISBN 978-1-137-44822-4
- Austrian Economics: An Introduction, (Cato Institute, 2020) ISBN 978-1948647953.

== Selected articles ==
=== As author or co-author ===
- In Natural Disasters, Companies Operate Like Neighbors, Wall Street Journal.
- "Beyond Equilibrium Economics: Reflections on the Uniqueness of the Austrian Tradition," (with Peter J. Boettke and David L. Prychitko), Market Process, 4 (2), Fall 1986, pp. 6–9, 20–25.
- "Competitive Currencies, Legal Restrictions, and the Origins of the Fed: Some Evidence from the Panic of 1907," Southern Economic Journal, 56 (3), January 1990, pp. 639–49.
- "Monetary Exchange as an Extra-Linguistic Social Communication Process," Review of Social Economy, 50 (2), Summer 1992, pp. 193–214.
- "Money, Money Prices, and the Socialist Calculation Debate," Advances in Austrian Economics, 3, 1996, pp. 59–77.
- "Capital Theory, Inflation, and Deflation: The Austrians and Monetary Disequilibrium Theory Compared," Journal of the History of Economic Thought, 18 (2), Fall 1996, pp. 287–308.
- "Monetary Calculation and Mises's Critique of Planning," History of Political Economy, 30 (3), Fall 1998, pp. 427–50.
- "From The Sensory Order to the Liberal Order: Hayek's Non-rationalist Liberalism," The Review of Austrian Economics, 13 (1), March 2000, pp. 23–40.
- "From Smith to Menger to Hayek: Liberalism in the Spontaneous Order Tradition," The Independent Review, 6 (1), Summer 2001, pp 81–97.
- "The Costs of Inflation Revisited," The Review of Austrian Economics, 16 (1), March 2003, pp. 77–95.
- "The Functions of the Family in the Great Society," Cambridge Journal of Economics, 29 (5), September 2005, pp. 669–684.
- "Heterogeneous Human Capital, Uncertainty, and the Structure of Plans: A Market Process Approach to Marriage and Divorce" (with Peter Lewin), The Review of Austrian Economics, 21 (1), March 2008, pp. 1–21.
- "Making Hurricane Response More Effective: Lessons from the Private Sector and the Coast Guard During Katrina" Policy Comment #17, Mercatus Center, Washington, DC, March 19, 2008.
- Horwitz, Steven (2008). "Hoover's Economic Policies". In David R. Henderson (ed.). Concise Encyclopedia of Economics (2nd ed.). Indianapolis: Library of Economics and Liberty. ISBN 978-0865976658. OCLC 237794267.
- "The Empirics of Austrian Economics" Cato Unbound, Cato, Washington, DC, September 5, 2012.
