= Sautet =

Sautet is a surname. Notable people with the surname include:

- Claude Sautet (1924–2000), French author and film director
- Frédéric Sautet (born 1968), French economist
- Marc Sautet (1947–1998), French writer, teacher, translator, and philosopher
- Philippe Sautet (born 1961), French chemist
