= Roger Ream =

American nonprofit executive

- Born: November 12, 1954 (age 70); Neenah, Wisconsin, United States

Roger R. Ream (born November 12, 1954, in Neenah, Wisconsin, United States) is the president of The Fund for American Studies (TFAS), a nonprofit organization with a mission to "develop courageous leaders inspired and equipped to protect and advance the ideas of individual liberty, personal responsibility, and economic freedom in their communities and throughout the world."

== Education ==
Ream received his bachelor's degree from Vanderbilt University in 1977. He also did graduate work in economics at George Mason University.

While at Vanderbilt, Ream received a Barry M. Goldwater Scholarship to attend The Fund for American Studies Institute on Political and Economic Systems at Georgetown University in Washington, D.C., during the summer of 1976. He was named John and Virginia Engalitcheff Outstanding Young American at the program. During the summer he interned for Congressman Philip M. Crane (R-Ill).

== Early career ==
Upon graduation from college, Ream returned to Washington to work for the American Conservative Union. He joined the Phil Crane for president committee in 1978. He then became a senior staff member and served as director of seminars for the Foundation for Economic Education in Irvington, New York. Returning to Washington in 1982, Ream joined the staff of Rep. Ron Paul, handling tax and budget policy issues. In 1984, Ream helped found and served as vice president for development at Citizens for a Sound Economy, an economic policy organization in Washington, D.C.

== The Fund for American Studies ==
In 1991, he joined The Fund for American Studies as executive vice president and was named president and chief operating officer in 1998. Ream is the host of The Fund for American Studies' Liberty + Leadership podcast.

Ream was a founding member of the Frank S. Meyer Society and serves as its secretary. He served as the chairman of the Board of the Foundation for Economic Education and the U.S. Air Force Academy Foundation. He is a past president of the Philadelphia Society and a member of the advisory board of Talent Market.

Ream is the recipient of the Bradley Foundation's Bradley Prize and a member of the Citizens' Stamp Advisory Committee.

== Personal life ==
Ream was born to Rev. Norman S. Ream and Muriel Ream on November 12, 1954, in Neenah, Wisconsin. He grew up just outside Milwaukee, Wisconsin, in the suburb of Wauwatosa. He and his wife, Mary Kay, had three daughters. Mary Kay died of progressive supranuclear palsy in 2023.
