= Hans Sennholz =

Austrian School economist (1922–2007)

Hans F. Sennholz
- Born: 3 February 1922; Bergkamen, Unna, Germany
- Died: 23 June 2007 (aged 85); Grove City, Pennsylvania, US
- Resting place: Saint Johns Union Cemetery, Farmers Mills, Pennsylvania

Academic background
- Education: New York University (PhD) 1955; University of Cologne (Dr. rer. pol.) 1949; University of Marburg (M.A.) 1948; University of Texas
- Influences: Ludwig von Mises

Academic work
- Discipline: macroeconomics, political science
- School or tradition: Austrian School
- Institutions: Foundation for Economic Education (1992–1996); Grove City College (1956–1992); Iona College (1954–1955)

Hans F. Sennholz (/ˈzɛnhɔːlts/; German: [ˈzɛnhɔlts]; 3 February 1922 – 23 June 2007) was a German-born American Austrian School economist and prolific author who studied under Ludwig von Mises. A Luftwaffe pilot during World War II, he was shot down over North Africa on 31 August 1942, and spent the remainder of the war in a POW camp in the United States.

After returning to Germany, Sennholz took degrees at the universities of Marburg in 1948 and Köln in 1949. He returned to the United States to study for a Ph.D. at New York University where he became Mises' first Ph.D. student in the United States. He taught economics at Grove City College, 1956–1992. After he retired, he became president of the Foundation for Economic Education, 1992–1997.

== Early life ==
=== World War II ===
He was drafted into the Luftwaffe during World War II and became the pilot of a Messerschmitt Bf 109, earning the Iron Cross for valor from his engagements in Norway, France, and Russia. He was shot down over North Africa on August 31, 1942, at a time when the battle for north Africa was intensifying, and spent the remainder of the war in a POW camp in the United States, ultimately located to a POW camp in Wilson, Arkansas, where he worked from 1945 to 1946 at the Wilson dairy farm "milking 20 cows twice a day".

==== Wartime diary ====
During his stay in Arkansas, he maintained a journal of his time as a POW. When he was released to Germany in 1946, he gave the journal to a trusted guard. "Please send this to my home when the time comes." But the journal never arrived.

In 1964, William Harrison, a factory worker in Jonesboro, Arkansas, found the journal on the bank of Bay Ditch, a drainage artery bordering 'old' Highway 63. In November 1985, Harrison took the journal to Scott Darwin, a professor of German at Arkansas State University. Harrison was told that the obsolete German script could not be translated by anyone on staff. Its translation would come by Erika Cohen, having attended German schools in the 1930s when the style was in use. She was the German-born wife of Robert S. Cohen, M.D.; they married while he was serving in the U.S. Army Medical Corps.

The journal told the story of its unidentified author's life as a Luftwaffe pilot, being shot down in north Africa and his subsequent time as a German POW in Arkansas. This, perhaps, was intentional, as POWs were not allowed personal possessions.

In 1988, Harrison published the story, "Who Wrote the Diary", in Die Welt, a large-circulation German newspaper. Willie Weischhoff read the story, which mentioned him by name, and wrote to his friend and fellow German POW, Hans Sennholz, a professor of economics at Grove City College. On October 20, 1988, Harrison received a letter from Sennholz stating: "I am the POW author you have been looking for."

== Post-war education and career ==
After returning to Germany, Sennholz took degrees at the universities of Marburg in 1948 and Köln in 1949. He then moved to the United States to study for a Ph.D. at New York University. He was Ludwig von Mises' first PhD student in the United States. He taught economics at Grove City College, 1956–1992, having been hired as department chair upon arrival. After he retired, he became president of the Foundation for Economic Education, 1992–1997. Calvinist Political Philosopher, John W. Robbins, pointed out in a book printed in honor of Sennholz shortly after his death that "Sennholz, ... rests his defense of a free society on revelation."

Fellow Austrian School economist Joseph Salerno, praised Sennholz as an under-appreciated member of the Austrian School who "writes so clearly on such a broad range of topics that he is in danger of suffering the same fate as Say and Bastiat. As Joseph Schumpeter pointed out, these two brilliant nineteenth-century French economists, who were also masters of economic rhetoric, wrote with such clarity and style that their work was misjudged by their British inferiors as 'shallow' and 'superficial'."

== Sennholz's influence ==
2008 U.S. presidential candidate, Ron Paul, credits his interest in economics to meeting Sennholz and getting to know him well. Peter Boettke, Director of the F. A. Hayek Program for Advanced Study in Philosophy, Politics, and Economics at the Mercatus Center at George Mason University, first learned economics from Sennholz as a student at Grove City College.

== Bibliography ==
=== Articles ===
- "Forecasting." Freeman, vol. 20, no. 1 (January 1970): 11-15.
- "What We Can Know About the World." Freeman, vol. 20 (1970): 443.
- "Omnipotent Government." Freeman, vol. 20 (1970): 440–442.
- "The Great Depression". Freeman (October 1969)
- "The Crisis in International Economic Relations." imprimis, vol. 2, no. 3 (March 1973): 1-6.

=== Book reviews ===
- Review of Omnipotent Government: The Rise of the Total State and Total War by Ludwig von Mises. Freeman, vol. 20 (1970): 440–442. Full audio.

=== Books ===
==== Authored ====
- Divided Europe. New York (1955)
- How Can Europe Survive? New York: D. Van Nostrand Company (1955)
- Moneda y libertad. Buenos Aires, Argentina (1961)
- The Great Depression. Lansing, MI (1969)
- Inflation or Gold Standard. Lansing, MI (1973)
- Death and Taxes. Washington, D.C. (1976) [2nd ed. 1982]
- Problemas económicas de actualidad. Buenos Aires, Argentina (1977)
- Age of Inflation. Belmont, MA (1977)
- The Underground Economy. Auburn, AL: Ludwig von Mises Institute (1984)
- Money and Freedom. Grove City, PA: Libertarian Press (1985)
- The Politics of Unemployment. Spring Mills, PA (1987)
- Debts and Deficits. Spring Mills, PA (1987)
- The Great Depression: Will We Repeat It?. Spring Mills, PA (1988)
- The Savings and Loan Bailout. Spring Mills, PA (1989)
- Three Economic Commandments. Spring Mills, PA (1990)
- The First Eighty Years of Grove City College. Grove City, PA (1993)
- Reflection and Remembrance. Irvington, NY (1997)
- Sowing the Wind. Grove City, PA (2004)
- Age of Inflation Continued. Grove City, PA (2006)

==== Edited ====
- Gold is Money. Westport, Conn: Greenwood Press (1975)
- Free to Try. Irvington-on-Hudson, New York: Foundation for Economic Education (1995)
