= Richard Ebeling =

American economist (born 1950)

- Born: Richard M. Ebeling; January 30, 1950 (age 76); New York City, U.S.

Academic work
- Discipline: Austrian economics
- School or tradition: Austrian School

Richard M. Ebeling (/ˈɛbəlɪŋ/; born January 30, 1950) is an American libertarian author who was the president of the Foundation for Economic Education (FEE) from 2003 to 2008. Ebeling is currently the BB&T Distinguished Professor of Ethics and Free Enterprise Leadership at The Citadel in Charleston, South Carolina.

Ebeling is a supporter of the Austrian School of Economics and written extensively on the subject, particularly as inspired by the works of Friedrich Hayek, Israel Kirzner, Ludwig Lachmann, and Ludwig von Mises. Much of his career has focused on Ludwig von Mises, for whom he posthumously published a trove of writings that had been looted by the Nazis from his Vienna apartment in 1938 and subsequently captured by the Soviet Army at the end of World War II. Following the documents' discovery and translation, Ebeling edited and published the three volume series Selected Writings of Ludwig von Mises.

Ebeling's most recent works include Political Economy, Public Policy, and Monetary Economics: Ludwig von Mises and the Austrian Tradition (Routledge, 2010), Austrian Economics and the Political Economy of Freedom (Edward Elgar, 2003), Monetary Central Planning and the State (The Future of Freedom Foundation, 2015) and For a New Liberalism (American Institute for Economic Research, 2019). He was a co-author and co-editor of In Defense of Capitalism in 5 volumes.

== Biography ==
Ebeling received his B.A. degree in economics from California State University, Sacramento, his M.A. degree in economics from Rutgers University and a Ph.D. in economics from Middlesex University in London.

Ebeling served as a lecturer at University College Cork, Ireland from 1981 to 1983 as an assistant professor at the University of Dallas from 1984 to 1988 and then as the Ludwig von Mises Professor of Economics at Hillsdale College from 1988 to 2003. From 1989 to 2003, he also served as vice president of academic affairs for the Future of Freedom Foundation. Ebeling was named president of Foundation for Economic Education (FEE) in May 2003 and announced in April 2008 that he was resigning his position to return to teaching. From 2004 to 2005, Ebeling served as an adjunct professor at The King's College in New York City. He also serves as an adjunct scholar at the Ludwig von Mises Institute in Auburn, Alabama.

Ebeling was the Shelby C. Davis Visiting Professor in American Economic History and Entrepreneurship at Trinity College in Hartford, Connecticut (2008–2009) and a senior fellow at the American Institute for Economic Research (AIER) in Great Barrington, Massachusetts (2008–2009). Ebeling was a professor of economics at Northwood University (2009–2014) in Midland, Michigan.

Ebeling received the Franz Cuhel Award for Excellence in Free Market Education presented by the Liberální Institut (Prague, 2007) and the "Liberty in Theory: Lifetime Award" presented by Libertarian Alliance/Libertarian International (London, 2005). He has also twice been a Hayek Fellow at the Institute for Humane Studies (1975, 1977).
