= Institute for Humane Studies =

American libertarian non-profit organization

Coordinates: 38.8844°N 77.1009°W

- Founded: 1961
- Founder: F. A. Harper
- Type: 501(c)(3) public charity
- Tax ID no.: 941623852
- Purpose: Classical liberalism
- Location: Arlington, Virginia
- Region served: United States
- Method: Education
- Key people: President and CEO Emily Chamlee-Wright
- Revenue: $21.1 million (2025)
- Expenses: $20.4 million (2025)
- Staff: 110 (2025)
- Website: theihs.org

The Institute for Humane Studies (IHS) is a non-profit organization that promotes the teaching and research of classical liberalism in higher education in the United States. IHS offers funding opportunities, programs, and events for faculty and graduate students seeking careers in academia as well as various fellowships.

Founded by F. A. "Baldy" Harper in 1961, the organization later began an association with George Mason University and in 1985 moved to Fairfax, Virginia. The institute is currently located at 3434 Washington Blvd. on the Arlington campus of George Mason University. It is partially funded by the Charles Koch Foundation.

== History ==
The Institute for Humane Studies was founded in 1961 in Menlo Park, California, by F. A. Harper in order to promote peace, prosperity, and social harmony by fostering a greater understanding of human affairs and freedom. Initially serving as the secretary and treasurer, Harper became the institute's president in 1966, a position he held until his death in 1973. Murray Rothbard played a key role as speaker at IHS conferences in the 1970s, promoting Austrian economics. On May 18, 1999, the 100th anniversary of the birth of Nobel Prize-winning economist Friedrich A. Hayek, who had been "instrumental in helping F.A. "Baldy" Harper found the Institute in 1961", IHS staff and friends gathered to honor Hayek. Following Harper in the role of president were Louis M. Spadaro and Leonard Liggio, who served as president from 1980 to 1989. From 1998 to 2000, Stanford graduate David C. Nott, now with the Reason Foundation, led the organization as president. The current president and CEO, Emily Chamlee-Wright, served as provost and dean at Washington College from 2012 to 2016 and was previously the Elbert H. Neese Professor of Economics and associate dean at Beloit College. Her predecessor, Marty Zupan, served as president and CEO from 2001 to 2016 after serving as editor of Reason magazine.

After beginning an association with George Mason University, Liggio, Walter Grinder, and John Blundell moved the institute to Fairfax, Virginia, in 1985. The organization is currently located on the George Mason University Arlington campus, along with sister organization the Mercatus Center.

== Organization and funding ==
The institute's board of directors includes Christopher Coyne, Tyler Cowen, Charles G. Koch (chairman emeritus), Brian Hooks, Art Pope, Virgil Storr, Ryan Stowers (chairman), and Todd Zywicki.

IHS has received funding from a number of foundations, including the Sarah Scaife Foundation, the John Templeton Foundation, the F.M. Kirby Foundation, the Marcus Foundation, the John William Pope Foundation, the Ed Uihlein Family Foundation, the Ralph Smeed Private Memorial Foundation, the Koch Family Foundations, the Searle Freedom Trust, the E.L. Craig Foundation, and the Lynde and Harry Bradley Foundation.

In March 2012, in the midst of a legal dispute between Charles Koch and the Cato Institute that caused renewed scrutiny of Koch's political philanthropy, IHS's chief financial officer told the New York Times that Koch is "a longtime and generous supporter of ours, but we're not involved as a political organization." Charles Koch donated a total of $12.4 million to the organization from 2008 to 2012. The John William Pope Foundation has donated $2.1 million to the Institute since 1986.

IHS fundraising appeals have been targeted to specific projects in the past. In 2011, Rand Paul signed a 10-page fundraising letter seeking gifts for the institute's Learn Liberty project, which IHS describes as a "resource for exploring the ideas of a free society." Learn Liberty was acquired by Students for Liberty in 2019.

== Programs ==
=== Seminars ===
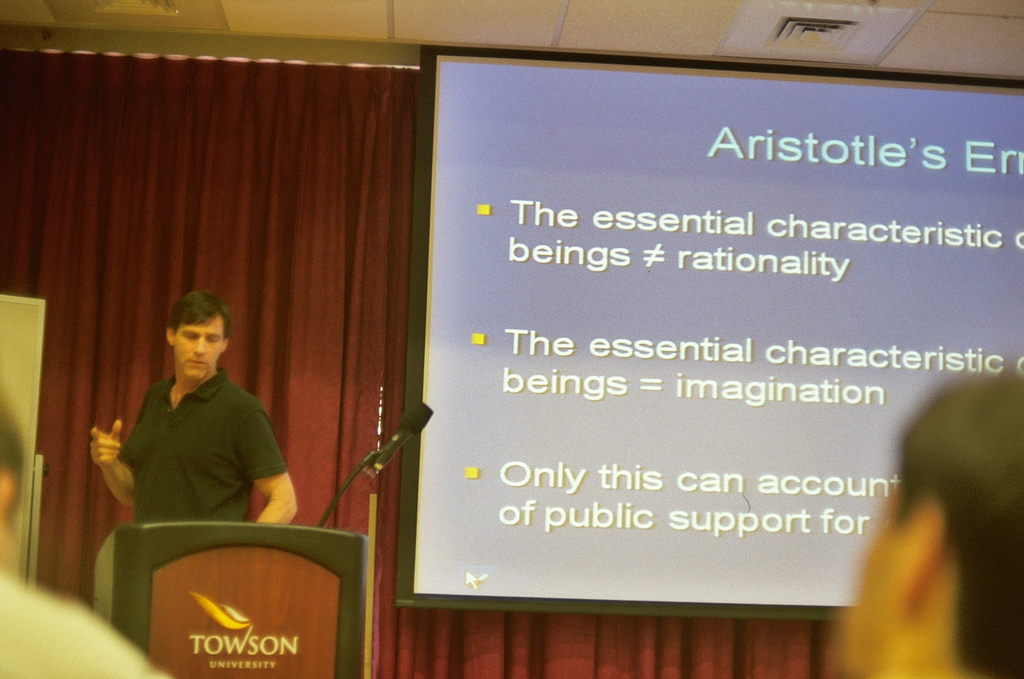
John Hasnas lecturing at Towson University

Each summer, IHS runs several free, weekend-long summer seminars for university students from around the world. Seminars are interdisciplinary and include lectures on history, economics, philosophy, law, and political science. Seminar themes include the value of property rights, limited government, peace, natural rights, free trade, individual autonomy, and free markets. There are introductory and advanced seminars. IHS also runs weekend on-campus seminars during the academic year. IHS and Liberty Fund co-sponsor the Advanced Topics in Liberty program, which is an invitation-only, discussion-based weekend conference series.

For graduate students pursuing academic careers, IHS sponsors an annual research colloquium, policy research seminars and invitation-only Career Development Seminars designed to help students "land a job in academia, gain tenure, and contribute to the academic and intellectual conversation."

=== Scholarships and grants ===
Each year IHS awards over $1 million in scholarships to students from universities around the world. Through its Humane Studies Fellowship program, IHS awards up to $15,000 in scholarships to graduate students embarking on "liberty-advancing careers in ideas." Each summer, through the Summer Graduate Research Fellowship, IHS gives $5,000 stipends to young academics "to refine and complete a publishable scholarly article or thesis chapter that engages ideas within the classical liberal tradition." The IHS PhD Scholarship awards $1,500 to "students dedicated to developing, teaching, and applying the principles of a free society." Other various grants are awarded to graduate students and junior faculty to aid in their ability to present research or interview at academic or professional conferences.

=== Online projects ===
In 2010, IHS launched LearnLiberty.org, a website producing educational videos on libertarian ideas. The site's stated goals are "to provide a starting point for conversations on important questions: What is the nature of man and society? What are the best ways to organize human society? What is the proper role for government?" Notable guest lecturers featured on Learn Liberty include David Schmidtz of the University of Arizona and Jeffrey Miron of Harvard University.

=== Internships ===
Each summer, for more than 20 years, IHS hosted the Charles G. Koch Summer Fellow Program. The program is now hosted by the Charles Koch Institute. The program ran for 10 weeks and included a paid public policy internship with two career and policy seminars. Fellows were placed at partner think tanks and policy organizations across the United States. IHS also ran a year-round journalism internship program that placed aspiring journalists at media companies and non-profit newsrooms, but both the journalism and policy internship programs have been discontinued.

=== Awards ===
Each year, IHS awards an alumnus of its programs with the Charles G. Koch Outstanding IHS Alum Award. The award is given in recognition of "significant contributions to advancing liberty." Past award winners include libertarian legal theorist and law professor Randy Barnett; Kris Mauren, co-founder of the Acton Institute; law professor Todd Zywicki; Kristina Kendall, executive producer for John Stossel; political science professor John Tomasi; Scott Bullock, senior attorney at the Institute for Justice; economist Peter Boettke; John Hood, president of the John Locke Foundation; and David Schmidtz, a professor of philosophy and economics.
