= Social progressivism =

Left-wing political philosophy

A Progress Flag, based on Daniel Quasar's 2018 design combining elements of the Philadelphia flag and the trans pride flag, and brown and black. The flag is closely associated with social progressivism.

Social progressivism (Note: Also known as cultural progressivism or identity liberalism.) is a political philosophy and a variety of progressivism that places emphasis on the evolution of society's moral values. While closely related to cultural liberalism and coming from that tradition, social progressivism noticeably moves the focus from purely individual choice to collective justice, structural power dynamics, and group representation, seeing societal progress as requiring systemic intervention on behalf of marginalized groups to correct historical or social inequalities. These social correctives may come through public norms, institutional reform, or cultural reeducation. The more active or hands-on role for the government in social progressivism differs from other variants of cultural liberalism, such as the more hands-off cultural libertarianism.

== History and definition ==
While the term "liberal" gained political currency in the early 19th century, the underlying principles of individual liberty and tolerance have roots in the Enlightenment and movements like the Protestant Reformation, which emphasized individual conscience. Economist Emily Chamlee-Wright has written that cultural liberalism is one of the "Four Corners of Liberalism" (the other three being economic, epistemic, and political), describing cultural liberalism as "encourag[ing] us to experiment with different ways of living. It allows us to learn that peaceful coexistence in a pluralistic society is possible. And it helps to ensure that minority communities are considered full-fledged participants in the social order." Chamlee-Wright noted a special interchange between political liberality and cultural progressivism, pointing to Jonathan Rauch's contention that "the legalization of gay marriage would not have happened without free speech, which drove cultural progress. But that cultural progress arguably accelerated change that favored a politically liberal outcome." Particularly in the United States, some scholars have noted that one of the largest differences between the progressivism of the Progressive Era and contemporary U.S. progressivism comes down to cultural politics. Princeton economics professor Thomas C. Leonard described historical progressivism in The American Conservative as being "[a]t a glance, ... not [having] much here for 21st-century progressives to claim kinship with. Today's progressives emphasize racial equality and minority rights, decry U.S. imperialism, shun biological ideas in social science, and have little use for piety or proselytizing."

== Application and reception of term ==
Progress Pride and Trans Pride flags flying on the walls of Cardiff Castle for Pride Month 2025

In the United States, social liberalism describes progress-oriented moral and social values or stances on socio-cultural issues such as abortion and same-sex marriage as opposed to cultural or social conservatism. A social conservative or a social liberal in this sense may hold either more conservative or progressive views on fiscal policy. Cultural progressives may be economically centrist, conservative, or progressive. For instance, the Czech Pirate Party is classified as a culturally progressive party, and it calls itself "economically centrist and socially liberal."

The phrase "social justice warrior" originated in the late 20th century as a neutral or positive term for people engaged in social progressive activism. In 2011, when the term first appeared on Twitter, it changed from a primarily positive term to having a negative connotation. Social justice warrior or SJW is a generally pejorative term mostly used for an individual who promotes socially progressive views, especially regarding cultural topics.

According to The Economist, as the term woke and the #Staywoke hashtag began to spread online, the term "began to signify a progressive outlook on a host of issues as well as on race". By 2019, opponents of progressive social movements were using the term mockingly or sarcastically, implying that "wokeness" was an insincere form of performative activism. A 2025 study in Research & Politics found general agreement among members of the U.S. Democratic and Republican parties about what broadly constitutes “woke,” associating it with progressive positions on race and gender. However, Democrats associated the term with a larger range of racially and gender-progressive positions, while Republicans associated it more strongly with positions that they perceive as Democratic beliefs. Writer and activist Chloé Valdary has expressed concern about the association of "woke" with social progressivism as a "double-edged sword" which "alert[s]...systemic injustice" while simultaneously being "an aggressive, performative take on progressive politics".

== See also ==
- Civil and political rights
- Cultural liberalism
- Egalitarianism
- Gender and politics
- Identity politics
- Positive liberty
- Radical feminism
- Woke
