= F. A. Harper =

American economist (1905–1973)

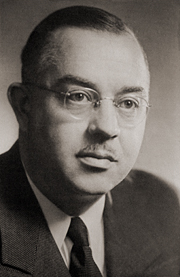
- Born: February 7, 1905; Middleville, Michigan
- Died: April 21, 1973 (aged 68)

Academic background
- Education: Michigan State University; Cornell University
- Influences: Herbert J. Davenport; Leo Tolstoy

Academic work
- School or tradition: Austrian School

Floyd Arthur "Baldy" Harper (February 7, 1905 – April 21, 1973) was an American academic, economist, and writer who was best known for founding the Institute for Humane Studies in 1961.

== Personal life ==
Baldy Harper was born and raised in Middleville, Michigan, and graduated from Michigan State University. He went on to obtain a doctorate in agricultural economics from Cornell University. Economist Herbert J. Davenport was influential to Harper during his time at Cornell.

In 1930, Harper married Marguerite Kaechele. The couple had four children: Barbara, Harriet, Helen, and Larry.

== Career ==
The Federal Farm Board employed Harper as a research field agent in 1930 and 1931. He worked as a business analyst for the Farm Credit Association in 1934. In academia Harper spent 19 years as a professor of marketing at Cornell University and in 1937 was appointed acting head of the Department of Agricultural economics at the University of Puerto Rico. He left Cornell in 1946 after university officials decided that he should not be assigning readings of Austrian economist Friedrich Hayek's work. In 1946, Harper helped Leonard Read start the Foundation for Economic Education. A member of the Mont Pelerin Society, Harper was present at the group's first meeting in 1947 along with Friedrich Hayek, Ludwig Von Mises, Milton Friedman, and Karl Popper. Harper served on the staff of the Foundation for Economic Education until 1958, when he became a co-director of the William Volker Fund, a position he held until 1961. In the early 1960s, Harper served as a visiting professor of moral philosophy at Wabash College. Harper is best known for founding the Institute for Humane Studies. Initially he served as the institute's secretary and treasurer. In 1965 he became the institute's president, a position he held until his death in 1973.

== Institute for Humane Studies ==
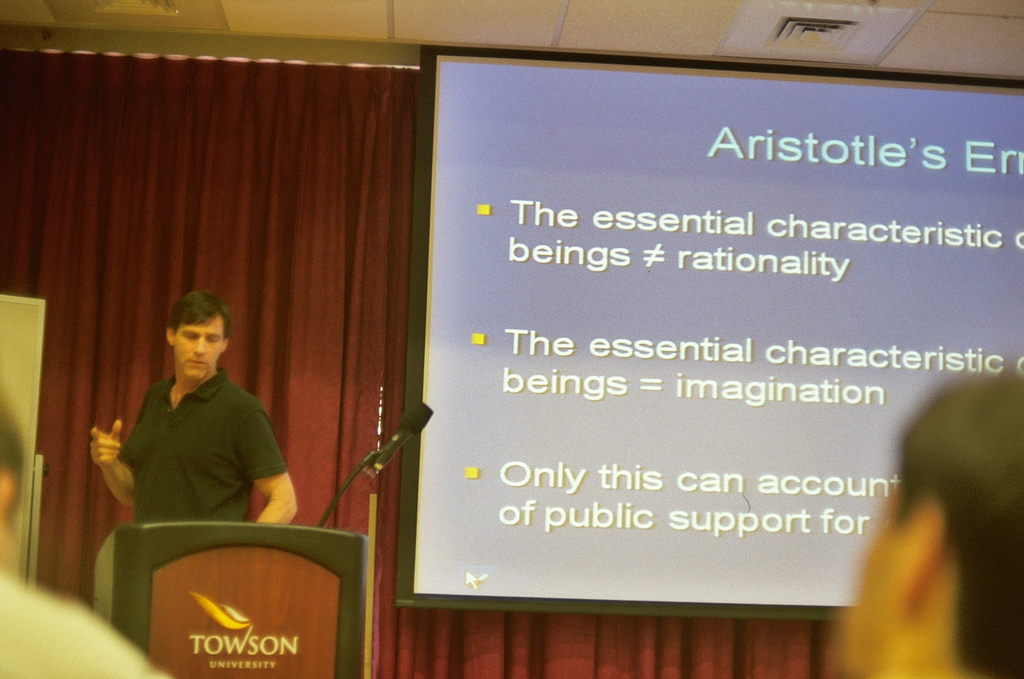
John Hasnas lecturing at Towson University during an Institute for Humane Studies seminar

Harper founded the Institute for Humane Studies in 1961 in Menlo Park, California. The institute, which began in Harper's garage, is a non-profit organization that offers educational and career programs. The educational programs include seminars, scholarships to undergraduate and graduate students, an archive of recorded lectures, and an interactive website based on a multi-axis model of political thought. The career assistance programs include paid internships for students and recent graduates, a networking website for classical liberal academics, and recognition of alumni accomplishments. Initially serving as the secretary and treasurer, Harper became the institute's president in 1966, a position he held until his death in 1973. After beginning an association with George Mason University, Leonard Liggio, Walter Grinder, and John Blundell moved the institute to Fairfax, Virginia, in 1985. The organization is currently located at 3434 Washington Blvd. on the George Mason University Arlington campus.

== Legacy ==
Mentoring a network of classical liberal scholars, building institutions, encouraging scholarship, and laying out strategy and practice for the libertarian movement is where Harper's influence is visible today. Current Institute for Humane Studies chairman of the board Charles Koch said that Harper's book, Why Wages Rise, influenced his philosophical framework. In 1978 and 1979 the Institute for Humane Studies published The Writings of F. A. Harper. Koch wrote the tribute section, saying, "Of all the teachers of liberty, none was as well-beloved as Baldy, for it was he who taught the teachers and, in teaching, taught them humility and gentleness."

The Mercatus Center at George Mason University established the F.A. Harper Professorship in Economics, a position currently held by Christopher Coyne. In October 2011, Coyne co-authored an article entitled War and Liberty: Wisdom From Leonard E. Read and F. A. 'Baldy' Harper. The article reviews the main themes of Harper's anti-war pamphlet In Search of Peace and argues that Harper's ideas are as important and relevant today as they were in 1950.

== Works ==
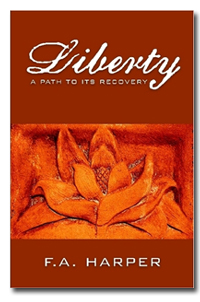
Harper's magnum opus Liberty, A Path to Its Recovery explains his philosophy of libertarianism.

- Harper, F A; C W Vaughn (November 1927). "Machines for Handling Statistics". American Mathematical Monthly. 34 (9): 446–453. JSTOR 2300220.
- Harper, F A (1939). Reasons for Differences in the Price of Apples Received by Ulster County Growers, 1937 Crop ... Ithaca, NY: Dept. of Agricultural Economics and Farm Management Cornell University.
- Harper, F A (May 1, 1937). "Using Economic Information in Building an Annual Farm Program: Discussion". Journal of Farm Economics. 19 (2): 422–424. doi:10.2307/1230944. ISSN 1071-1031. JSTOR 1230944.
- Harper, F A; F F Hill (May 1944). "Have We Food Enough for All?". American Journal of Nursing. 44 (5): 523. doi:10.1097/00000446-194405000-00060.
- Harper, F A (November 1, 1944). "The Importance of Storage Costs in Accumulating Food Stocks". Journal of Farm Economics. 26 (4): 794–800. doi:10.2307/1232125. ISSN 1071-1031. JSTOR 1232125.
- Harper, F A; Pearson, Frank (1945). The World's Hunger. Ithaca, NY: Cornell University Press. p. 90.
- Harper, F A (May 1, 1948). "The Government's Agricultural Policy and Inflation". Proceedings of the Academy of Political Science. 23 (1): 30–36. doi:10.2307/1172885. ISSN 0065-0684. JSTOR 1172885.
- Harper, F A (1948). High Prices. Irvington, NY: Foundation for Economic Education. p. 71.
- Harper, F A (1957). Why Wages Rise. Foundation for Economic Education. ISBN 978-0910614054. Archived from the original on November 4, 2011.
- Harper, F A (July 19, 1968). "Federal Funds Mean Federal Control". Science. 161 (3838): 220. Bibcode:1968Sci...161..220H. doi:10.1126/science.161.3838.220. PMID 5657323.
- Harper, F A (1969). The Crisis of the Free Market. Chicago: Johnson. p. 83. ISBN 978-4829112151.
- Harper, F A (1979). The Writings of F A Harper. Arlington, VA: Institute for Humane Studies. ISBN 978-0896170001. v1 v2
- Harper, F A (1931). F. A. Harper Papers. Stanford, CA: Hoover Institution Archives.
