= Brian Hooks (nonprofit leader) =

American non-profit executive

Brian Hooks is an American nonprofit executive who is CEO and chairman of Stand Together. He is also the president of the Charles Koch Foundation and president of the Stand Together Fellowship.

Hooks is currently on the boards of the Mercatus Center, the Cosmos Institute, the Economic Policy Innovation Center, the Institute for Humane Studies, the Reason Foundation, the Just Trust, Believe in People, and Movement Musick.

== Early life and education ==
He attended the University of Michigan from 1996 to 2000, graduating with a B.A. in political science.

== Career ==
Hooks was chief operating officer and executive director of the Mercatus Center at George Mason University from 2006 until 2014 when he became president of the Charles Koch Foundation.

In July 2018, Hooks was named chairman and CEO of Stand Together, which describes itself as "a philanthropic community that helps America’s boldest changemakers tackle the root causes of our country’s biggest problems, from education to the economy, broken communities, and toxic division, among dozens of other pressing issues."

In recent years, Hooks has emphasized partnerships in philanthropy and bridging divides. His work has included bipartisan efforts on criminal justice reform which brought together Van Jones and the ACLU together with Senate Republicans and The Heritage Foundation to pass the First Step Act in 2018. He was a co-signer to a 2023 opinion piece in The Chronicle of Philanthropy titled "We Disagree on Many Things, but We Speak with One Voice in Support of Philanthropic Pluralism" along with prominent philanthropists Heather Templeton Dill, Kathleen Enright, Sam Gill, Darren Walker, and Elise Westhoff.

Hooks was named to the TIME 100 Next list in 2021.

== Personal life ==
Hooks lives in Virginia with his wife and daughter.
