= Stand Together Fellowship =

Libertarian-oriented public policy research organization

- Named after: Charles Koch
- Predecessor: Charles Koch Institute
- Formation: 2011; 15 years ago
- Type: 501(c)3
- Tax ID no.: 27-4967732
- Headquarters: Arlington, Virginia, United States
- Region served: United States
- Chairman: Charles Koch
- President: Brian Hooks
- Revenue: $8.33 million (2024)
- Expenses: $2.98 million (2024)
- Endowment: $446 million
- Website: www.charleskochinstitute.org

Stand Together Fellowship, formerly known as the Charles Koch Institute is a libertarian-oriented public policy research, programming, grant-making, and fellowship-funding organization based in Virginia. Charles Koch is the group's founder and primary financier. Stand Together Fellowship pursues free market economic policies and a non-interventionist foreign policy that has been characterized as anti-neoconservative.

== History ==
The Charles Koch Institute was established in 2011 and housed in a building shared with the Charles Koch Foundation. According to Charles Koch, the institute is the beneficiary of a majority of his personal political donations, or those separate from what originates from Koch Industries.

== Governance ==
The institute is governed by a board of directors composed of Charles Koch, Chase Koch, Elizabeth Koch, and Richard Fink. Its president is Brian Hooks.

=== Domestic policy ===
According to the organization, it funds "research that furthers an understanding of how cronyism and corporate welfare affect individual and societal well-being".

In 2015, the organization partnered with the American Civil Liberties Union to study the implications of legislation limiting asset forfeiture in New Mexico. The institute has also developed a Prison Entrepreneurship Program that sponsors business classes and a business plan competition for U.S. prison inmates.

=== Foreign policy ===
The institute finances research, forums, and speaking tours regarding U.S. foreign policy, describing its worldview as one that "emphasizes the need to defend our territorial integrity from aggression, promote free trade, peacefully engage with the world, and serve as an exemplar of liberal values".

In 2016, The Intercept described the institute's foreign policy agenda as emblematic of "how foreign policy no longer neatly aligns with party politics", observing one event the organization hosted that appeared more like "a left-wing anti-war rally than a gathering hosted by a longtime right-wing institution". The same year it hosted a conference headlined by Chas Freeman, Stephen Walt, and John Mearsheimer.

=== Professional education ===
According to the organization, it underwrites several professional education programs, including the Koch Associate Program, a fellowship which funds the placement of selected applicants into management positions at partner organizations, which include the Acton Institute, the Regulatory Studies Center at George Washington University, the James Madison Institute, and others.
