= Stand Together =

Philanthropic organization

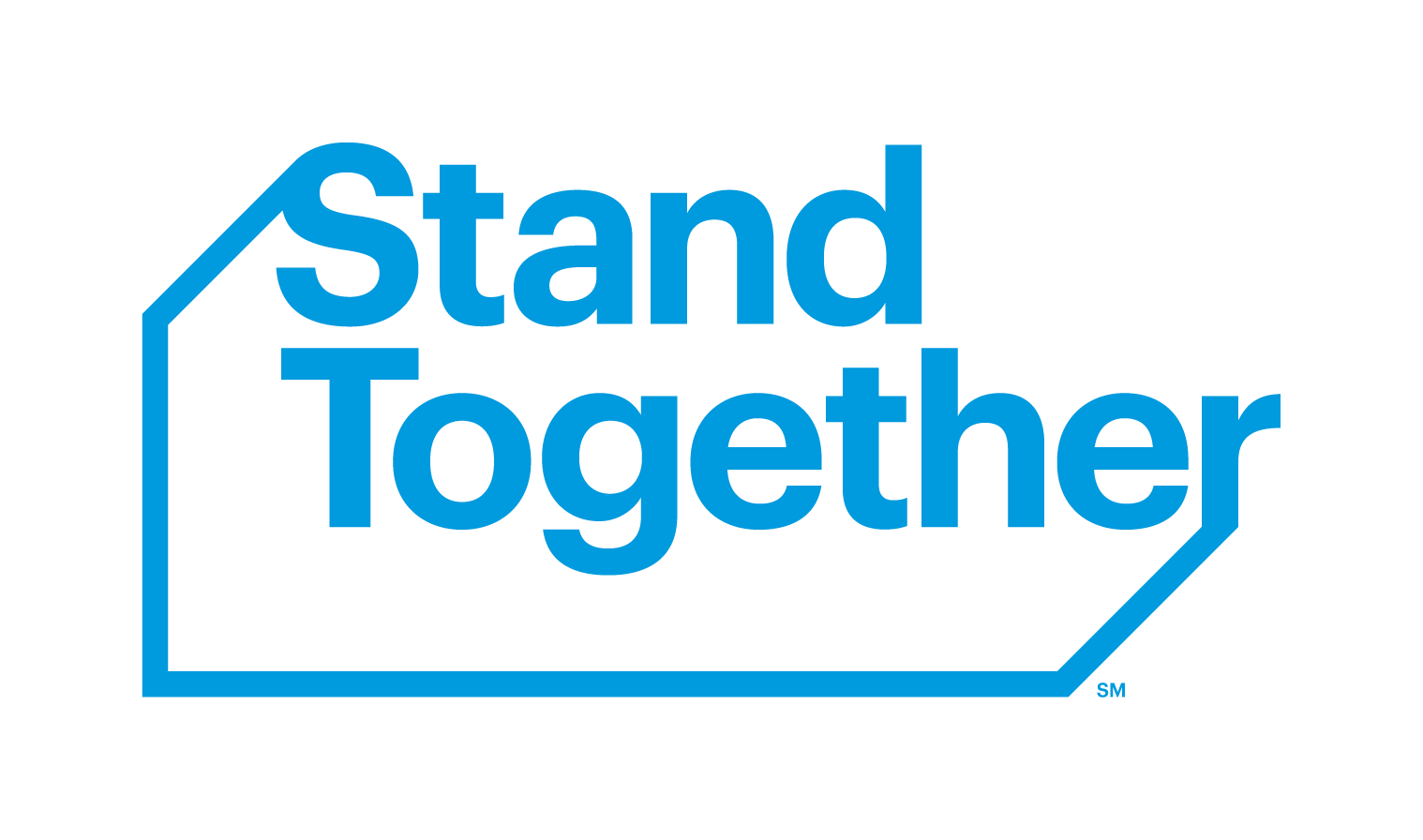
- Formation: 2003; 23 years ago
- Founder: Charles Koch
- Type: Nonprofit
- Tax ID no.: 27-3197768
- Headquarters: Arlington, Virginia, U.S.
- Revenue: $432.6 million (2024)
- Website: standtogether.org
- Formerly called: The Seminar Network

Stand Together is an American philanthropic organization that was first established in 2003 to promote civil society across the United States. It is a 501(c)(3) nonprofit organization based in Arlington, Virginia, and was founded by Charles Koch to assist philanthropic activities across the United States. Formerly known as the Seminar Network, its renaming as Stand Together was announced on May 20, 2019 and is considered to be informally part of the Koch network. The founding CEO is Brian Hooks.

== Founding and history ==
In 2003, Charles Koch began hosting annual meetings of business leaders and philanthropists to support various education and policy initiatives. From these seminars grew a philanthropic community of organizations working to address issues such as poverty, addiction, recidivism, gang violence and homelessness. In 2019, this advocacy organization became the Stand Together Foundation. Stand Together seeks to identify and mentor organizations addressing what it deems as society's biggest challenges. In a speech in January 2019 in Palm Springs, Charles Koch signaled he would shift away from partisan politics and focus on goals that cut across ideologies.

Brian Hooks is the current chairman and CEO. He previously served as executive director of the Mercatus Center at George Mason University and is also president of the Charles Koch Foundation. Other leadership members include Evan Feinberg, Amy Pelletier, and Kevin Lavelle.

== Operations ==
Hooks has explained the goal of Stand Together is to seek non-partisan, bottom-up solutions to societal issues. Founder Charles Koch has admitted that a political approach his organizations had taken in prior years proved unsuccessful and divisive. In recent years, leaders of affiliated organizations have stated an intention to endorse policies and candidates regardless of political party. Despite this aim, some organization within the Stand Together community engage in policy and politics. Stand Together works on issues including education, poverty, criminal justice, immigration, free expression, trade, foreign policy, economic opportunity, technology and business.

Stand Together was involved in a bipartisan coalition on criminal justice reform in 2018 during the Trump administration to pass the First Step Act. Stand Together has cited this approach as a key to its effectiveness and continues to bridge divides on this issue and many others like foreign policy and immigration. In January 2026, Stand Together launched the "Be the People" campaign that hopes to unite Americans regardless of political affiliation to solve issues affecting the country as a whole, with the stated aim of restoring a sense of civic duty in the country.
