= Paul Heyne =

American economist (1931–2000)

- Born: Paul Theodore Heyne; November 2, 1931; St. Louis, Missouri, US
- Died: April 9, 2000 (aged 68); Seattle, Washington, US

Academic background
- Education: Concordia Seminary; Washington University in St. Louis; University of Chicago

Academic work
- Discipline: Economics

Paul Theodore Heyne (November 2, 1931 – April 9, 2000) was an American economist and academic who lectured on economics at the University of Washington in Seattle.

Heyne received two divinity degrees from Concordia Seminary in St. Louis, took his master's degree at Washington University and his PhD in ethics and society at the University of Chicago. He came to the UW in 1976 and reportedly turned down a tenured position to become a senior lecturer because of his interest in teaching undergraduates.

Heyne promoted economics through his interests with religion, social issues, justice and free-market economies. His best-known work was his critically acclaimed introductory textbook The Economic Way of Thinking, which sold 200,000 copies in Russia alone and has been translated in Bulgarian, Czech, Hungarian, Romanian and other languages. Heyne was largely committed to undergraduate education.

Heyne, a native of St. Louis, Missouri, died in Seattle, aged 68.

== Selected bibliography ==
- 1976. Paul T. Heyne, Thomas Johnson. Toward Economic Understanding. ISBN 9780574192554. Science Research Associates.
- 2000. Paul Heyne A Student's Guide to Economics: Volume 3 of ISI Guides to the Major Disciplines. ISBN 978-1882926442. Intercollegiate Studies Institute.
- 2008. Paul T. Heyne, Geoffrey Brennan, A. M. C. Waterman. "Are Economists Basically Immoral?": And Other Essays on Economics, Ethics, and Religion. ISBN 9780865977136. Liberty Fund.
- 2013. Paul L. Heyne, Peter J. Boettke, David L. Prychitko.The Economic Way of Thinking: Pearson New International Edition. ISBN 9781292053608. Pearson Education.

== See also ==
- Geoffrey Brennan
