= Youth Entrepreneurs Kansas =

U.S. non-profit educational organization

Youth Entrepreneurs
- Official Youth Entrepreneurs logo
- Founded: 1991
- Founder: The Charles G. Koch Charitable Foundation
- Type: Charitable educational organization
- Tax ID no.: 48-1187886
- Purpose: Education of "at-risk" students
- Location(s): 4111 E. 37th St. Wichita, KS 67220
- Coordinates: 37.7515°N 97.2861°W
- Region served: United States
- Method: offering specialized classes for high school credit
- Owner: Independent
- Key people: Kylie Stupka, Executive Director; Phoebe Bachura, Development Director; Jill Engstrom, Development Coordinator
- Website: YE official website
- Formerly called: Youth Entrepreneurs Kansas

Based in Wichita, Kansas, Youth Entrepreneurs (YE) is a 501(c)(3) official non-profit educational organization. They state that their goal is to provide entrepreneurship education to students in middle school and high school.

== Origin ==
In 1991, Liz and Charles Koch founded Youth Entrepreneurs, originally an eight-week course at a Wichita high school. By 2019, the organization had grown to a presence in over 126 schools throughout the United States.

== Goals and operations ==
Youth Entrepreneurs states that their major objective is to provide high school students, particularly at-risk students, with business and entrepreneurial education.

Currently, the organization offers year-round high school classes about economics with an emphasis on "free market principles" and practical business skills.

After 2010, the organization began offering YA students college credits through the organization's partnership with Butler Community College and other higher learning institutions, in the hopes of helping students to "get a head start on their college career". Like the high school classes, these college-level courses are aimed at providing business training.

Classes that run through the school year are supplemented by summer camps. The summer camp at Dodge City High School in Dodge City, Kansas, for example, aims to provide students with an interactive and a way to practice business principles, including by competing for cash prizes and receiving feedback for business ideas that students present.

In 2011, YE awarded $100,000 in scholarship money to YE alumni to pursue 4-year degrees. YE also supports alumni through mentorship programs, ensuring that they have a support structure including continuing education and networking to aid them in breaking into the business world.

== Controversy ==
The YE program has been criticized for being a platform to disseminate the Koch philosophy. Charles and his brother David Koch were longtime supporters of the Libertarian Party before becoming Republican kingpins. In 1980 and at the beginning of the Reagan era, the Libertarian platform proposed a drastic revision of the American education system: "We advocate the complete separation of education and state. Government schools lead to the indoctrination of children and interfere with the free choice of individuals. Government ownership, operation, regulation, and subsidy of schools and colleges should be ended."

YE High School posters target predominantly poor students with the premise of receiving generous financial incentives including startup capital and scholarships after graduation. YE classes are disguised as typical high school business courses, taught in public schools by a certified teacher. But they are actually guided by Youth Entrepreneurs, with lesson plans and class materials promoting the Koch Industries free-market Libertarian ideology. Course information includes: The minimum wage hurts workers and slows economic growth. Low taxes and less regulation allow people to prosper. Public assistance harms the poor. Government, in short, is the enemy of liberty.
