= Foundation for Economic Education =

Libertarian education organization

- Founded: March 7, 1946; 80 years ago
- Founder: Leonard E. Read
- Type: Educational foundation IRS 501(c)(3) tax exempt
- Tax ID no.: 136006960
- Purpose: Economics, libertarianism
- Location: Atlanta, Georgia, U.S.
- Coordinates: 33°48′04″N 84°23′36″W
- Region served: United States
- Method: literature, lecture, conferences, online courses, multimedia, academic scholarship
- Budget: Revenue: $6.74 million Expenses: $6.95 million (FYE 2025)
- Endowment: $2.44 million (2025)
- Employees: 48(2024)
- Website: fee.org

The Foundation for Economic Education (FEE) is an American conservative, libertarian economic think tank. Founded in 1946 in New York City, FEE is now headquartered in Atlanta, Georgia. It is a member of the State Policy Network.

FEE offers publications, lectures, and student workshops promoting free market principles. FEE was ranked the 55th top think tank in the United States by the 2020 Global Go To Think Tank Index Report.

== Views ==
FEE states that its mission is to promote principles of "individual liberty, free-market economics, entrepreneurship, private property, high moral character, and limited government." Friedrich Hayek described FEE's goal as "nothing more nor less than the defense of our civilization against intellectual error."

== History ==
FEE, founded in 1946, is considered the oldest free-market think tank in the United States. An early aim was challenge and reverse elements of the New Deal. FEE opposed the Marshall Plan, Social Security, and minimum wages, reflecting its broader skepticism toward government intervention in social and economic policy

Its founding by Leonard E. Read, (Note: Read was the Los Angeles Chamber of Commerce executive director, from 1938 to 1945.) Henry Hazlitt, (Note: of the New York Times) David Goodrich, (Note: of B. F. Goodrich) Donaldson Brown, (Note: of General Motors Corporation) Leo Wolman, (Note: of Columbia University) Fred Rogers Fairchild, (Note: of Yale University) Claude E. Robinson, (Note: of Opinion Research Corporation) and Jasper Crane (Note: of duPont) followed a capital campaign started in 1945 by Crane, who was a DuPont executive, and Alfred Kohlberg. Early contributors included J. Howard Pew, Inland Steel, Quaker Oats, and Sears. As an "intellectual lighthouse", in Read's words, FEE distinguished itself from other business-supported groups by building up the intellectual framework for laissez-faire capitalism as an ideology.

Read served as president from 1946 until his death in 1983. Perry E. Gresham was an interim president in 1983. The presidency of FEE from 1983 to 1984 was held by John Sparks Sr., from 1984 to 1985 by Bob Love, from 1985 to 1988 by a series of acting presidents, then from 1988 to 1992 by Bruce Evans. After retiring from Grove City College where he taught economics, Hans Sennholz served as president from 1992 to 1997. Donald J. Boudreaux served as president from 1997 to 2001, before moving on to chair the Department of Economics at George Mason University. Economist Mark Skousen served as president from 2001 to 2002. Author and professor Richard Ebeling served as president from 2003 to 2008. From 2008 to 2019, FEE's president was economist, author, and professor Lawrence W. Reed.

=== Location ===
FEE first occupied two rooms in New York City's Equitable Building in 1946. Soon after, the organization moved to a residential property in Irvington, New York, purchased in 1946 and which served as its headquarters for the next 68 years. The Foundation sold the Irvington headquarters after the transfer of its operations to Atlanta, Georgia.

=== Impact ===
Murray Rothbard was influenced by FEE economist Baldy Harper and credited FEE with creating a "crucial open center" for a libertarian movement. Friedrich Hayek saw FEE as part of the inspiration for the formation of the Mont Pelerin Society in 1947, and FEE also provided a financial subsidy to the society. Hayek encouraged Antony Fisher to found the Institute of Economic Affairs after visiting FEE in 1952. Ludwig von Mises had a "long-term association with the Foundation for Economic Education."

According to the 2020 Global Go To Think Tank Index Report (Think Tanks and Civil Societies Program, University of Pennsylvania), FEE is number 55 in the "Top Think Tanks in the United States" (Table 7 – out of 110).

== Leadership ==
Diogo Costa became the 12th president of FEE in 2024.

Lawrence W. Reed serves as FEE's President Emeritus. He is the author of Was Jesus a Socialist?.

Jon Miltimore is the managing editor at FEE. Kerry McDonald, an education policy writer, serves as a FEE senior fellow.

In 2019, Zilvinas Silenas became the president of FEE. He is one of the "most quoted opinion leader[s]" in Lithuania, previously serving as president of the Lithuanian Free Market Institute and expanding its teachings within Lithuanian high schools. The textbook Economics In 31 Hours, co-authored by Silenas, is now read by 80 percent of high school students in Lithuania.

== Programs ==
FEE offers a variety of programs for high school students, undergraduates, and graduate students. It is known for free summer seminars.

Since 1946, FEE has sponsored public lectures by figures including Ludwig von Mises, F.A. Hayek, Henry Hazlitt, Milton Friedman, James M. Buchanan, Vernon Smith, Walter Williams, F.A. "Baldy" Harper, and William F. Buckley Jr.

The Leonard E. Read Distinguished Alumni Award recognizes FEE alumni whom the alumni board considers to have demonstrated "an exceptional dedication to liberty." Notable recipients have included:

- Matt Kibbe (2018), founder of Free the People, a non-profit organization promoting libertarian ideals
- Edwin Feulner, founder and former president of The Heritage Foundation
- Venkatesh Geriti, social entrepreneur
- Jack Kemp, former vice presidential candidate
- Charles Koch, chairman of Koch Industries
- Ron Paul, author, physician, and former Congressman
- Roger Ream, president of The Fund for American Studies
- Robert Sirico, founder of Acton Institute

== Publications ==
FEE published The Freeman magazine from 1954 to 2016. (Note: ISSN 0016-0652; OCLC 1570149) FEE was the original publisher of the essay "I, Pencil", which explored how markets coordinate the disparate activities necessary for economic cooperation.

FEE publishes books, articles, and pamphlets both on paper and digitally that the foundation considers classic works on liberty. These include I, Pencil: My Family Tree by Read, The Law by Bastiat, Anything That's Peaceful by Read, Planned Chaos by Mises, Industry-Wide Bargaining by Wolman, Up from Poverty: Reflections on the Ills of Public Assistance by Sennholz, and The Virtue of Liberty by Machan.

== See also ==
- The Foundation for Harmony and Prosperity
- Atlas Network
- Free to Choose Network
