= Donald J. Boudreaux =

American economist (born 1958)

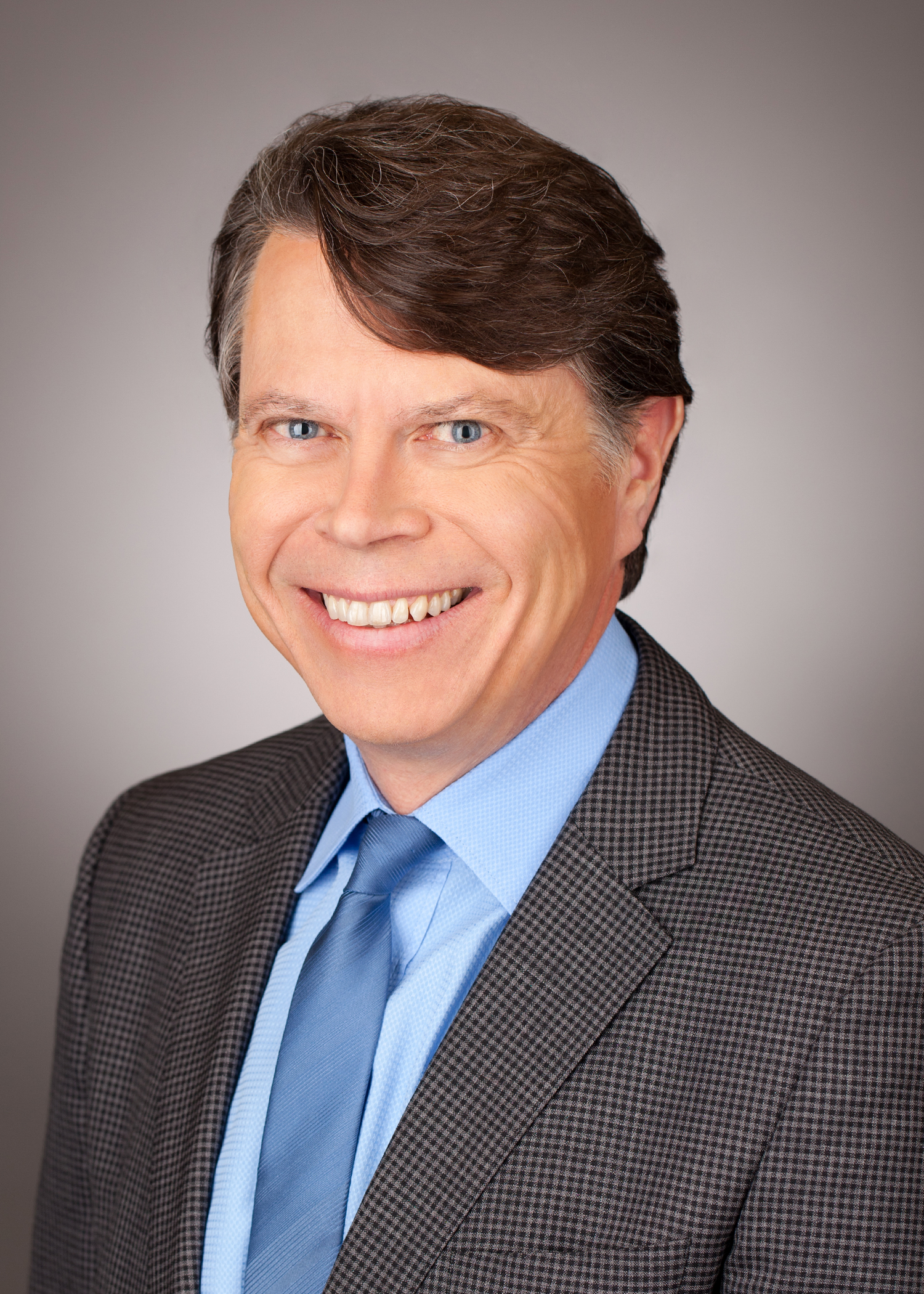
- Born: September 10, 1958 (age 68); New Orleans, Louisiana, U.S.
- Spouse: Karol Ceplo Boudreaux

Academic background
- Education: Nicholls State University (BA); New York University (MA); University of Virginia (JD); Auburn University (PhD)
- Influences: Friedrich Hayek, James M. Buchanan, Adam Smith, Deirdre McCloskey

Academic work
- Discipline: Austrian economics, competition law, international trade, law and economics
- School or tradition: Austrian School, public choice
- Institutions: Clemson University; Cornell University; George Mason University

Donald Joseph Boudreaux (born September 10, 1958) is a libertarian American economist, author, professor, and co-director of the Program on the American Economy and Globalization at the Mercatus Center at George Mason University in Fairfax, Virginia.

== Early life and education ==
Boudreaux received a Ph.D. in economics from Auburn University in 1986 with a thesis on "Contracting, Organization, and Monetary Instability: Studies in the Theory of the Firm". He received a J.D. from the University of Virginia School of Law in 1992.

== Academic career ==
Boudreaux was an assistant professor of economics at George Mason University, from 1985 to 1989. He was an associate professor of legal studies and economics at Clemson University, from 1992 to 1997, and president of the Foundation for Economic Education, from 1997 to 2001. He is now professor of economics at George Mason University, where he served as chairman of the economics department, from 2001 to 2009.

During the spring 1996 semester, he was an Olin Visiting Fellow in Law and Economics at Cornell Law School. Boudreaux is an adjunct scholar at the Cato Institute, a Washington, D.C.–based think tank.

== Writings ==
He is the author of the 2007 and 2012 books Globalization and Hypocrites and Half-Wits, respectively.

He regularly contributes a column to the Pittsburgh Tribune-Review and contributes to the Cafe Hayek blog.

== Other activities ==
Boudreaux has lectured in Europe, North America and South America on topics including the nature of law, competition law and economics, and international trade.

He spoke at an Institute for Economic Studies seminar on Europe & Liberty in Deva, Romania, in 2007.

He spoke at the Freedom Summit in 2001 and 2010.

== Views and opinions ==
Boudreaux has criticized Nobel Memorial Prize in Economic Sciences laureate Paul Krugman, stating that Krugman frequently "commits elementary errors" when discussing economics.

Boudreaux argued in October 2009 that insider trading "is impossible to police and helpful to markets and investors... Far from being so injurious to the economy that its practice must be criminalized, insiders buying and selling stocks based on their knowledge play a critical role in keeping asset prices honest—in keeping prices from lying to the public about corporate realities."

In a January 2013 article for The Wall Street Journal, Boudreaux and Mark Perry argued that the "progressive trope... that America's middle class has stagnated economically since the 1970s" is "spectacularly wrong". In a similar vein Boudreaux and Liya Palagashvili published an article in The Wall Street Journal in March 2014 discussing recent scholarship which shows that, contrary to what had been reported before by, wages have not decoupled from productivity in the US and Britain.

== Books ==
- Globalization (Greenwood Guides to Business and Economics), 2007
- Hypocrites & Half-Wits: A Daily Dose of Sanity from Cafe Hayek, 2012
- The Essential Hayek, 2015 free on kindle

== Op-eds ==
- "Trade Is Not a Job Killer," The New York Times, 3/28/2018.
- "'Price Gouging' After a Disaster Is Good for the Public," The Wall Street Journal, 10/3/2017.
- "Working Overtime to Avoid the Truth," The Wall Street Journal, 4/7/16.
- "The Myth of the Great Wages Decoupling," The Wall Street Journal, 3/6/14.
- "The Myth of a Stagnant Middle Class," The Wall Street Journal, 1/23/13.
