= The Fund for American Studies =

Non-profit organization in the USA

- Established: 1967; 59 years ago
- President: Roger Ream
- Chair: Randal C. Teague
- Address: 1706 New Hampshire Ave., NW, Washington, D.C. 20009
- Location: Washington, D.C., U.S.
- Coordinates: 38.9130°N 77.0408°W
- Interactive map of The Fund for American Studies
- Website: tfas.org

The Fund for American Studies (TFAS) is a non-profit organization based in Washington, D.C. Founded in 1967, the organization's mission is to educate students and young adults about leadership, the principles of limited government, and free-market economics. TFAS is a member of the State Policy Network. As of 2023, the president of TFAS is Roger Ream.

== History ==
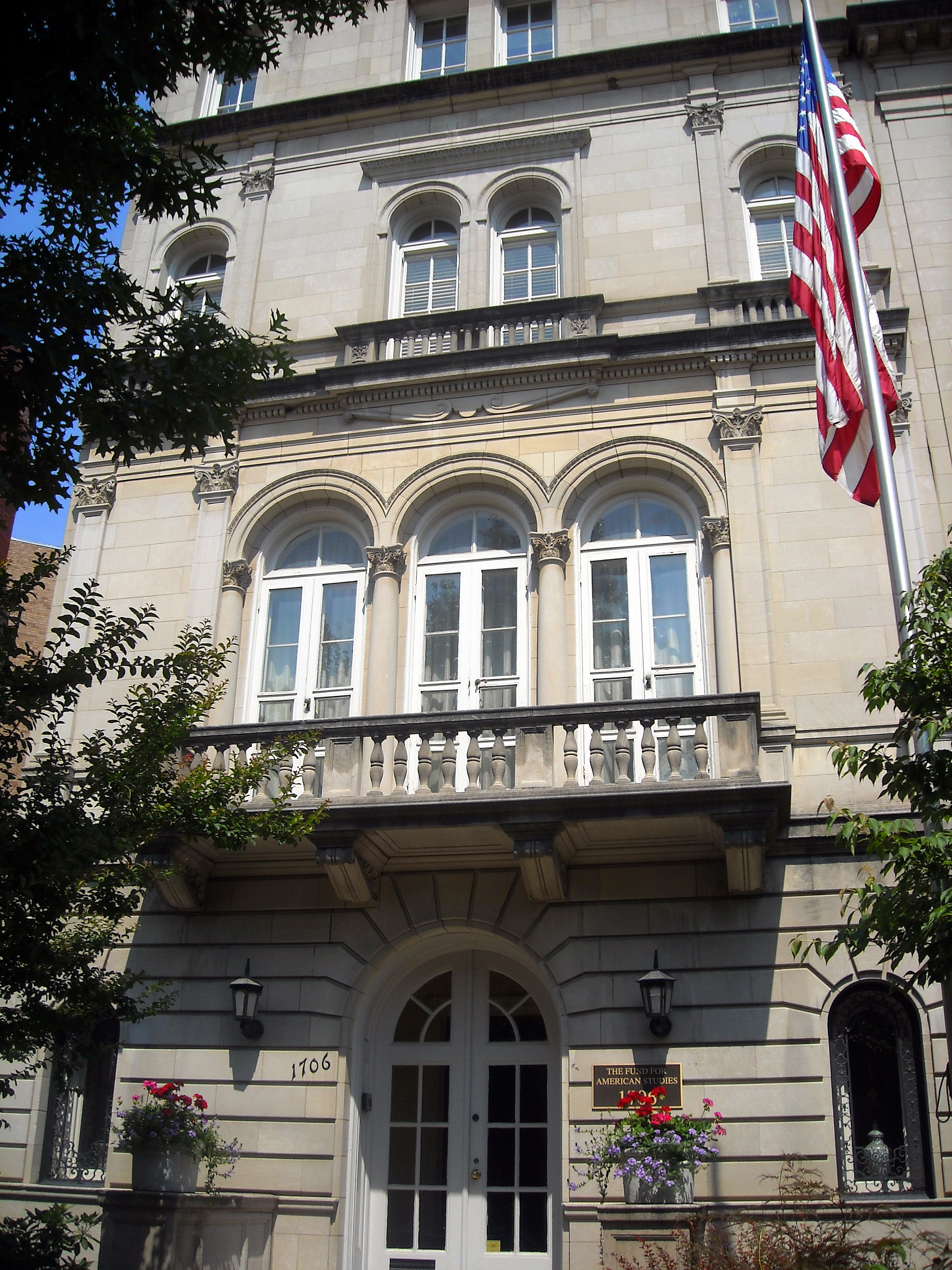
The Fund for American Studies headquarters in the Dupont Circle neighborhood of Washington, D.C.

The Fund for American Studies was founded by Charles Edison in 1967. Concerned about an eroding confidence in the American system of government, Edison recruited Walter H. Judd, David R. Jones, Marvin Liebman, and William F. Buckley Jr. to build a program that would educate college students about American government, politics, and economics.

On February 6, 1967, the group incorporated the Charles Edison Youth Fund. In 1969, Edison died suddenly. To honor him and carry on his mission, the organization was renamed the Charles Edison Memorial Youth Fund. In 1985, the organization was renamed again to its present-day title, The Fund for American Studies.

In the summer of 1970, the Edison Fund organized the inaugural Institute on Comparative Political and Economic Systems. Fifty-seven students attended the first Institute.

In 1993, The Fund for American Studies established overseas institutes in Prague, Chile, and Hong Kong.

== Walter Judd Freedom Award ==
The Walter Judd Freedom Award, in cooperation with the Center for International Relations, is presented annually to individuals who work to advance the cause of freedom in the United States.
