= Koch family foundations =

Philanthropy of Charles and David H. Koch

The Koch family foundations are a group of charitable foundations in the United States associated with the family of Fred C. Koch. The most prominent of these are the Charles Koch Foundation and the David H. Koch Charitable Foundation, created by Charles Koch and David Koch, two sons of Fred C. Koch who own the majority of Koch Industries, an oil, gas, paper, and chemical conglomerate which is the US's second-largest privately held company. Charles' and David's foundations have provided millions of dollars to a variety of organizations, including libertarian and conservative think tanks. Areas of funding include think tanks, political advocacy, climate change denial, higher education scholarships, cancer research, arts, and science.

The Koch family foundations began in 1953 with the establishment of the Fred C. and Mary R. Koch Foundation. The Fred C. and Mary R. Koch Foundation was established to support non-profits in Kansas, focusing on "arts, environmental stewardship, human services, enablement of at-risk youth, and education" through the funding of diversity programs at Kansas State University; the program Youth Entrepreneurs, a high-school level entrepreneurial and business program; the Gilder Lehrman Institute of American History, which develops programs to enhance the schools' history curricula; and the Bill of Rights Institute, an organization that holds seminars and workshops for teachers and administrators to provide "educational resources on America's Founding documents and principles" to enhance the learning experience for students.

In May 2019, the Kochs announced a major restructuring of their philanthropic efforts. Going forward, the Koch network will operate under the umbrella of Stand Together, a nonprofit focused on supporting community groups. The stated priorities of the restructured Koch network include efforts aimed at "increasing employment, addressing poverty and addiction, ensuring excellent education, building a stronger economy, and bridging divides and building respect".

== Foundations ==
=== Fred C. and Mary R. Koch Foundation ===
The Koch family foundations began in 1953 with the establishment of the Fred C. and Mary R. Koch Foundation. The Fred C. and Mary R. Koch Foundation was established to support non-profits in Kansas focusing on "arts, environmental stewardship, human services, enablement of at-risk youth, and education" through the funding of diversity programs at Kansas State University; the program Youth Entrepreneurs, a high-school level entrepreneurial and business program; the Gilder Lehrman Institute of American History, which develops programs to enhance the schools' history curricula; and the Bill of Rights Institute, an organization that holds seminars and workshops for teachers and administrators to provide "educational resources on America's Founding documents and principles" to enhance the learning experience for students. The foundation's environmental aid includes support for science education, and donations to organizations such as The Nature Conservancy to help preserve the Tallgrass Prairie National Preserve, as well as the creation of the Koch Wetlands Exhibit in the Cheyenne Bottoms wetlands in Kansas.

=== Charles G. Koch Charitable Foundation ===
The Charles G. Koch Charitable Foundation was established in 1980 by Charles Koch. The Charles G. Koch Charitable Foundation was established with the stated purpose of advancing social progress and well-being through the development, application and dissemination of "the Science of Liberty".

The Charles G. Koch Charitable Foundation funded college study groups called Koch Scholars who gather and read "an assortment of select books, movies, and podcasts surrounding the principles of a free society." Such groups exist at the Jon M. Huntsman School of Business at Utah State University and the University of Alaska Fairbanks.

The Charles G. Koch Charitable Foundation granted Willie Soon, a researcher at the Harvard-Smithsonian Centre for Astrophysics who says that most global warming is driven by the sun, at least $230,000 over 14 years, according to documents obtained by Greenpeace under the US Freedom of Information Act.

In 2011, the Charles G. Koch Charitable Foundation granted $25,000 to the Heartland Institute, an American conservative and libertarian public policy think tank based in Chicago, a prominent supporter of global warming deniers.

In 2011, the Charles G. Koch Charitable Foundation split into the Charles Koch Institute and the Charles Koch Foundation.

=== Charles Koch Institute ===
The Charles Koch Institute was established in 2011, and is active in the area of professional education, research and training programs for careers in advancing economic freedom. It runs the Koch Internship Program, the Koch Associate Program, and Liberty@Work.

The Charles Koch Institute has advocated bipartisan criminal justice reforms. Among the planned reforms are reducing recidivism rates, lower barriers into the workforce for the rehabilitated, and eliminate the systemic overcriminalization and overincarceration of persons from generally low-income minority communities. The reforms would also put an end to asset forfeiture by law enforcement, which deprives the incarcerated of, very often, the majority of their private property.

The institute, steered by the Koch family, has worked closely with the Obama administration, the ACLU, the Center for American Progress, Families Against Mandatory Minimums, the Coalition for Public Safety, the MacArthur Foundation and other left-leaning organizations to promote these reforms. Both President Barack Obama and Anthony Van Jones have applauded the commitment to progress over party.

=== Charles Koch Foundation ===
The Charles Koch Foundation was established in 2011, and is focused on grants and supporting higher education programs that analyze how free societies advance the well-being of mankind. It supports the Koch Institute's programs. As of 2014, the Charles Koch Foundation has given grants to almost 300 colleges and universities, according to their website. Brian Hooks, who formerly led the Mercatus Center, has served as the foundation's president since 2014.

In 2014, Koch Industries Inc. and the Charles Koch Foundation granted $25 million to the United Negro College Fund (UNCF). In protest of the Kochs, the American Federation of State, County and Municipal Employees, a major labor union, ended its annual $50,000–$60,000 support for the UNCF, saying that the UNCF's involvement with the Charles Koch Foundation was 'a betrayal of everything the UNCF stands for' because, they said, the Koch brothers were 'the single most prominent funders of efforts to prevent African-Americans from voting'.

A student campaign, spearheaded by Greenpeace, Forecast the Facts, and the American Federation of Teachers, called UnKochMyCampus claimed the Charles Koch Foundation at Florida State University stipulated final approval of hiring economics professors in return for their donation. Kimberley A Strassel criticized UnKochMyCampus in her March 27, 2015 Potomac Watch column of The Wall Street Journal. Strassel wrote that the campaigns' website directs student activists to a list of universities Koch foundations have donated to and provides instructions for how to "expose and undermine" any college thought that works against "progressive values."

Between 2011 and 2018, the foundation gave $300,000 to the online magazine Spiked, which has written articles against those in opposition to Koch brothers' interests.

=== David H. Koch Charitable Foundation ===
David H. Koch established the David H. Koch Charitable Foundation, which, according to its website, "has given nearly $200 million to support diverse causes nationwide including science and medical research, education, the arts, and more". The foundation has funded cancer research and a number of arts and science organizations, including the American Ballet Theatre, New York City Ballet, Lincoln Center for the Performing Arts, the Metropolitan Museum of Art, and the American Museum of Natural History. In 2015, an open letter to museums from 36 members of the scientific community demanded that the Smithsonian and other museums cut any ties with the Kochs, because of worries that they would remove information on climate change. The Smithsonian countered by stating both exhibits in question did examine in great detail the impacts of climate change. The Koch Foundation responded they "have pledged or contributed more than $1.2 billion dollars to educational institutions and cultural institutions, cancer research, medical centers, and to assist public policy organizations."

David Koch donated $35 million in 2012 to the Smithsonian's National Museum of Natural History and $20 million to the American Museum of Natural History in New York City. Joe Romm of ThinkProgress stated "David Koch did not personally intervene to affect the exhibit". David Koch was a member of the board of trustees of the American Museum of Natural History in New York and the Smithsonian National Museum of Natural History in Washington.

The David H. Koch Charitable Foundation is a significant funder of Americans for Prosperity, a libertarian/conservative political advocacy group. David H. Koch chaired the board of directors of the associated AFP Foundation.

=== Koch Cultural Trust ===
The Koch Cultural Trust was founded 1986 as the Kansas Cultural Trust and renamed in 2008 as the Koch Cultural Trust closed January 2013 and filed termination with the IRS February 2014.

=== Frederick R. Koch foundations ===
Another of Fred Koch's sons, Frederick R. Koch, is associated with the Frederick R. Koch Foundation and the Sutton Place Foundation, which are involved in supporting art and other cultural activities.

== Other beneficiaries ==
=== American Legislative Exchange Council (ALEC) ===
Between 2005 and 2011, the American Legislative Exchange Council (ALEC), a nonprofit organization of conservative state legislators and private sector representatives that drafts and shares model state-level legislation for distribution among state governments in the United States, was granted $348,858 from the Charles G. Koch Charitable Foundation, according to Greenpeace, a non-governmental environmental organization.

=== Citizens for a Sound Economy ===
Between 1986 and 1990, the Charles G. Koch Charitable Foundation, and the David H. Koch Charitable Foundation, granted a combined $4.8 million to the Citizens for a Sound Economy, a conservative political group.

=== Competitive Enterprise Institute ===
The Charles G. Koch Charitable Foundation, and David H. Koch Charitable Foundation, were among the funders of the Competitive Enterprise Institute, a non-profit, libertarian think tank.

=== Americans for Prosperity Foundation ===
David H. Koch Charitable Foundation granted $1 million in 2008 and the Charles G. Koch Charitable Foundation granted $67,556 in 2009 to the Americans for Prosperity Foundation.

== See also ==
- Donors Trust
