= Peter Boettke =

American economist (born 1960)

- Born: January 3, 1960 (age 66); Rahway, New Jersey, U.S.

Academic background
- Education: George Mason University (Ph.D., 1989)
- Influences: Ludwig von Mises, Friedrich Hayek, Hans Sennholz Adam Smith, Jean-Baptiste Say, Frédéric Bastiat, Israel Kirzner, Murray Rothbard, Kenneth E. Boulding, Richard Cornuelle, James M. Buchanan, Ronald Coase, Vernon L. Smith, Elinor Ostrom

Academic work
- Discipline: Market process theory, comparative political economy, history of economic thought, economic development, economic methodology, political economy, informal institutions
- School or tradition: Austrian school
- Website: Information at IDEAS / RePEc

Peter Joseph Boettke (/ˈbɛtki/; born January 3, 1960) is an American economist of the Austrian school. He is currently a professor of economics and philosophy at George Mason University; the BB&T Professor for the Study of Capitalism, vice president for research, and director of the F.A. Hayek Program for Advanced Study in Philosophy, Politics, and Economics at the Mercatus Center at George Mason University.

== Early life and education ==
Boettke was born and raised in Rahway, New Jersey, to Fred and Elinor Boettke. In high school and college, he played for the school basketball and tennis teams.

He attended Thiel College in Greenville, Pennsylvania and later Grove City College in nearby Grove City, Pennsylvania. At Grove City, he became interested in economics when he took a course taught by Hans Sennholz, and there he developed his religious convictions. After completing a B.A. (1983) in economics at Grove City, Boettke attended George Mason University where he earned an M.A. (1987) and a Ph.D. (1989) in economics. His thesis was The political economy of Soviet socialism, 1918–1928 under the supervision of Don Lavoie.

== Career ==
After receiving his doctoral degree, Boettke taught at several institutions, including Oakland University, Manhattan College and New York University. In 1998, he returned to George Mason University as a faculty member. In 2004, he was named a Hayek Fellow at the London School of Economics. He has also been a Faculty Fellow at the Charles University/Georgetown University American Institute for Political and Economic Studies in Prague and a visiting scholar at the Hoover Institution on War, Revolution and Peace at Stanford University. He has also been made an affiliated member of the Philosophy Department at George Mason University and, in 2012, he was awarded a doctorate honoris causa in social sciences from Universidad Francisco Marroquín.

In addition to his academic positions, he is vice president for research at Mercatus Center and director of the F.A. Hayek Program for Advanced Study in Philosophy, Politics, and Economics. Until 2007, Boettke held the position of director of graduate studies for the Ph.D. program in economics at George Mason. He is the editor of George Mason University's Review of Austrian Economics and as vice president of the Mont Pelerin Society for the 2018–2020 term. He was the society's president from 2016 to 2018.

== Analytical anarchism ==
Analytical anarchism is the name given by Boettke to the positive political economy of anarchism, or anarchism from the economic point of view, in the libertarian tradition of Murray Rothbard's For a New Liberty (1973) and David Friedman's The Machinery of Freedom (1973). Boettke claims that analytical anarchism has developed out of this tradition and is currently being pursued by economists such as Peter Leeson, Edward Stringham and Christopher Coyne.

== Publications ==
Books

- Living Economics: Yesterday, Today, and Tomorrow (Independent Institute and Universidad Francisco Marroquin 2012) ISBN 978-1-59813-072-0.
- Context Matters: Institutions and Entrepreneurship (co-authored with Christopher Coyne (professor)) (Now Publishers, 2009) ISBN 978-1601982063
- The Battle of Ideas: Economics and the Struggle for a Better World
- Is an Independent Non-Profit Sector Prone to Failure? (co-authored with David Prychitko)
- The Political Economy of Soviet Socialism: The Formative Years, 1918–1928 (Kluwer, 1990) ISBN 0-7923-9100-4.
- Why Perestroika Failed: The Politics and Economics of Socialist Transformation. London: Routledge. 1993. ISBN 0-415-08514-4 – via Internet Archive..
- Calculation and Coordination: Essays on Socialism and Transitional Political Economy (Routledge, 2001) ISBN 0-415-77109-9.
- The Economic Way of Thinking with Paul Heyne and David Prychitko (Pearson, 2014) ISBN 978-0-13-299129-2.
- Aligica, Paul Dragos; Boettke, Peter (2009). Challenging Institutional Analysis and Development: The Bloomington School. Routledge. ISBN 978-0-415-77820-6.

Books as editor

- Market Process: Essays in Contemporary Austrian Economics with David Prychitko. Edward Elgar, 1994.
- The Collapse of Development Planning. New York University Press, 1994.
- The Elgar Companion to Austrian Economics. Elgar, 1994
- The Market Process, 2 volumes, with David Prychitko. Elgar, 1998
- The Legacy of F. A. Hayek: Politics, Philosophy, Economics, 3 volumes. Edward Elgar, 1999
- Socialism and the Market: The Socialist Calculation Debate Revisited, 9 volumes. Routledge, 2000.
- The Legacy of Ludwig von Mises: Theory and History, ed. with Peter Leeson. 2 vols. Aldershot: Edward Elgar, 2006. ISBN 978-1-84064-402-9
- The Economic Point of View, the first volume of Israel Kirzner's Collected Works, edited with Frederic Sautet and published by Liberty Fund, December 2009.
- Handbook On Contemporary Austrian Economics, Edward Elgar, 2010.
- Market Theory and the Price System, the second volume of Israel Kirzner's Collected Works, edited with Frederic Sautet and published by Liberty Fund, May 2011.
- Essays on Capital, the third volume of Israel Kirzner's Collected Works, edited with Frederic Sautet and published by Liberty Fund, 2012.
- The Oxford Handbook of Austrian Economics, with Christopher Coyne. October 2015.
- The Economic Role of the State (ed. with Peter Leeson). Cheltenham: Edward Elgar, 2015.

Articles

- Boettke, Peter J. (2008). "Austrian School of Economics". In Henderson, David R. (ed.). The Concise Encyclopedia of Economics. Library of Economics and Liberty (2nd ed.). Liberty Fund. pp. 23–27. ISBN 978-0865976665.
- Boettke, Peter J.; Candela, Rosolino A. (2018). "Part I: Libertarianism and other Theories; Ch. 7: Liberal Libertarianism". In Brennan, Jason; van der Vossen, Bas; Schmidtz, David (eds.). The Routledge Handbook of Libertarianism. London and New York: Taylor & Francis Group. pp. 92–107. ISBN 978-0367870591.

== Personal life ==
Boettke resides in Fairfax, Virginia, with his wife and two sons.
