= The Foundation for Harmony and Prosperity =

Libertarian education organization

- Founded: December 24, 2007; 18 years ago
- Founder: Chris J. Rufer
- Type: Philanthropy / Private Operating foundation IRS 501(c)(3) tax exempt
- Tax ID no.: 94-3326027
- Purpose: Philosophy of Human Respect, social philosophy
- Headquarters: Sacramento, CA
- Location: Sacramento, California, U.S.
- Region served: United States
- Method: literature, video, multimedia
- Key people: Chris J. Rufer (Founder and Chairman); Emily Henkel (President)
- Website: harmonyandprosperity.org

The Foundation for Harmony and Prosperity is an American nonprofit organization based in Sacramento, CA that espouses and promotes awareness pertaining to what it calls "the Philosophy of Human Respect." This philosophy, according to the foundation, states that, "Initiated violence and theft always cause a decline in happiness, harmony, and prosperity."

== History ==
The Foundation for Harmony and Prosperity was founded in 2007 with funding provided primarily by Chris J. Rufer who developed the "Principles of Human Respect" and the resulting philosophy. Rufer had applied these principles to the operation of the company that he founded and leads, the Morning Star Company, a tomato processing company based in California. The foundation also works to put its material in front of student audiences.

== Assets ==
As of 2020, the Foundation for Harmony and Prosperity had an annual revenue of $1,500,050, and assets of $516,347.
