= Emily Chamlee-Wright =

American economist (born 1966)

- Born: Emily Laureen Chamlee; July 7, 1966 (age 60)
- Education: George Mason University
- Occupations: Economist, nonprofit executive

Emily Chamlee-Wright (born July 7, 1966) is an American economist who serves as president and CEO of the Institute for Humane Studies. From 2012 through 2016, she was the Provost and Dean of Washington College. She taught economics at Beloit College from 1993 to 2012, where she held the Elbert H. Neese Jr. Professorship in Economics and served as associate dean from 2010 to 2012. She was one of three principal investigators with the Mercatus Center researching Gulf Coast recovery efforts in the aftermath of Hurricane Katrina.

== Bibliography ==
- The Cultural Foundations of Economic Development: Urban Female Entrepreneurship in Ghana (Routledge 1997)
- Culture and Enterprise: The Development, Representation and Morality of Business (with Don Lavoie, Routledge 2000)
- The Cultural and Political Economy of Recovery: Social Learning in a Post-disaster Environment (Routledge 2010)
- Political Economy of Hurricane Katrina and Community Rebound (with Virgil Storr, Edward Elgar 2010)
- How We Came Back (with Nona Martin Storr and Virgil Storr, Mercatus Center 2015)
- Liberal Learning and the Art of Self-Governance (editor, Routledge 2015)
