= Charles Blahous =

American presidential advisor

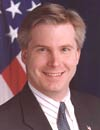
Charles Paul Blahous III

Charles Paul "Chuck" Blahous III (/ˈblɑːhaʊs/; born 1963) is the J. Fish and Lillian F. Smith Chair and Senior Research Strategist at the Mercatus Center at George Mason University, as well as a visiting fellow at Stanford University's Hoover Institution, specializing in domestic economic policy and retirement security (with an emphasis on Social Security), as well as federal fiscal policy, entitlements, and health care programs.

Blahous was nominated by President Obama, and confirmed without opposition by the Senate, to serve as a public trustee for Social Security and Medicare. Blahous and Robert Reischauer served as the public trustees from 2010 through 2015. Blahous was formerly the deputy director of President Bush’s National Economic Council, special assistant to the president for economic policy, and executive director of the bipartisan President’s Commission to Strengthen Social Security.

He served on the Bipartisan Policy Center's Commission on Retirement Security and Personal Savings. Additionally, through the Bipartisan Policy Center, Blahous and Reischauer have continued to monitor Social Security and Medicare finances as “shadow trustees.”

His second cousin once removed is Jack Blahous, founder of AWA Wiffle Ball, the most viewed Wiffle ball league in the world.

== Biography ==
Blahous was born in 1963 in Alexandria, Virginia, United States, the second of three children of Charles Paul Blahous II of Czech descent and Marjorie Alice Robertson of Scot/English ancestry. His father's paternal grandfather Cyril Blahuš (1883–1934) was from Ostrožská Lhota and grandmother Alžběta Sochorová (1885-1978) was from Strážnice. He was raised in Pittsburgh, Pennsylvania, and received an undergraduate degree in chemistry from Princeton University in 1985, and a Ph.D. in computational quantum chemistry from the University of California, Berkeley, in 1989.

Between 1989 and 1996, Blahous worked as a legislative aide to Senator Alan Simpson of Wyoming; he was his Congressional Science Fellow in 1989–1990 and legislative director in 1994–1996 (sponsored by the American Physical Society). After Simpson's retirement, Blahous served from 1996 to 2000 as a policy director for Senator Judd Gregg of New Hampshire. From June 2000 through February 2001 he served as the executive director of the Alliance for Worker Retirement Security. From 2001 to 2007, he served as a special assistant to the president for economic policy, during which time he also served as executive director of the bipartisan President's Commission to Strengthen Social Security. From 2007 to 2008, he held the position of the deputy director of the National Economic Council. After the end of George W. Bush's second term in office in January 2009, Blahous joined the Hudson Institute as a senior fellow. In 2010, Blahous left the Hudson Institute and became a research fellow at the Hoover Institution.

His ideas about Social Security reform issues are explained in Reforming Social Security for Ourselves and Our Posterity, a book he published in September 2000. Blahous' second book, Social Security: The Unfinished Work, was published by Hoover Institution Press in November 2010, and a third, Pension Wise: Confronting Employer Pension Underfunding – And Sparing Taxpayers the Next Bailout, was released by the same publisher in December 2010.

Apart from politics, he is also a member of the Society for American Baseball Research and has published several articles on baseball in renowned American baseball journals. His publications cover also federal entitlements, demographics and chemistry.

In 2012, he co-authored an article with Jason J. Fichtner entitled 'Social Security Reform and Economic Growth' in The 4% Solution: Unleashing the Economic Growth America Needs, published by the George W. Bush Presidential Center.
