= Christopher Coyne (professor) =

American economics professor

Christopher J. Coyne
- Born: 1977 (age 48–49)

Academic background
- Education: Manhattan University; George Mason University
- Influences: Peter Boettke; Tyler Cowen

Academic work
- School or tradition: Austrian school
- Institutions: George Mason University
- Awards: Hayek Fellow – London School of Economics
- Website: Information at IDEAS / RePEc

Christopher J. Coyne (born 1977) is an educator, researcher, and author. He is the F.A. Harper Professor of Economics at George Mason University and the associate director of the F. A. Hayek Program for Advanced Study in Philosophy, Politics, and Economics at the Mercatus Center. He has published a number of books in areas such as Austrian economics, economic development, and political economy.

== Education ==
After graduating in 1999 with a B.S. from Manhattan College, Coyne received his M.A. (2003) and Ph.D. (2005) in economics from George Mason University, where he studied with Peter Boettke and Tyler Cowen.

== Career in economics ==
After graduating from George Mason University in 2005, Coyne accepted a position as assistant professor of economics at Hampden-Sydney College. In 2007, he left Hampden-Sydney to accept a position as assistant professor of economics at West Virginia University. He joined the department of economics at George Mason University in 2010.

Besides his position at George Mason University, Coyne is the co-editor of The Review of Austrian Economics, the co-editor of The Independent Review, and the book review editor of Public Choice. He is also a member of the editorial board of the Journal of Private Enterprise, the Journal of Entrepreneurship & Public Policy, and Studies in Emergent Orders. He is also a research fellow at The Independent Institute, a member of the Board of Scholars for the Virginia Institute for Public Policy, and a member of the advisory board of The Cobden Centre.

The Fund for the Study of Spontaneous Orders, which is administered by the Atlas Economic Research Foundation, awarded Coyne its Hayek Prize in 2007 for:

...a series of related articles on the influence of institutional arrangements on entrepreneurship and international development; and on weak and failed states and the problem of nation building. In these articles Coyne applies an Austrian economics perspective to argue that just as successful economies and polities can not be built from whole cloth according to rational constructivist principles, there are limits to what even well-intentioned governments can do to build free markets and free political orders elsewhere

In 2008, he was named the Hayek Fellow at the London School of Economics. In 2010, he was a visiting scholar at the Social Philosophy and Policy Center at Bowling Green State University.

== Research ==
Coyne has numerous publications including academic journal articles, book chapters, policy papers, and book reviews. His primary areas of research include Austrian economics, economic development, and political economy.

His first book, After War: The Political Economy of Exporting Democracy, was published by Stanford University Press in November 2007 (ISBN 080475439X; paperback ISBN 0804754403). After War employs the tools of economics to analyze the ability of the U.S. to export democracy abroad. The central argument is that continued efforts to export democracy through military occupation and reconstruction are more likely to fail than to succeed because of an array of constraints facing occupiers and policymakers. In the book, Coyne contends that failure is due to the inability of foreign governments to centrally plan the complex array of institutions which underpin liberal democracy. Coyne provides a new vision of U.S. foreign policy including principled nonintervention and a commitment to free trade in goods, ideas and cultural products. He presented his book at the Cato Institute in November 2007. In his review of After War in the Financial Times, Samuel Brittan concluded by noting that,

Prof Coyne is obviously a dove rather than a hawk. But he accepts the case for occasional intervention for humanitarian reasons or to protect US citizens. His main suggestions are to avoid nation-building types of intervention and adopt free trade, if necessary unilaterally by the US. It is perhaps déformation professionelle for economists to overrate the spillover benefits of the latter. But peace and welfare may depend on how far the next US president accepts the main lines of his analysis – a subject even more important than the current credit crunch.

In, Media, Development, and Institutional Change, (Edward Elgar Publishing, 2009, ISBN 1847204783) Coyne and Peter Leeson investigate mass media's ability to affect institutional change and economic development. They analyze media's role in enabling and inhibiting political-economic reforms that promote development. The book explores how media can constrain government, how governments manipulate media to entrench their power, and how private and public media ownership affects a country's ability to prosper. Coyne and Leeson identify specific media-related policies that governments of underdeveloped countries should adopt if they want to grow. They also illustrate why media freedom is a critical ingredient in the recipe of economic development and why even the best-intentioned state involvement in media is more likely to slow prosperity than to enhance it.

Coyne is the co-editor, with Rachel Mathers, of The Handbook on the Political Economy of War (Edward Elgar Publishing, 2010).

His third authored book, Doing Bad by Doing Good: Why Humanitarian Action Fails, (Stanford University Press, 2013, ISBN 978-0804772280) builds on After War, which excluded broader notions of state-led humanitarianism (short and long-term aid and assistance, peacekeeping and security) to assist and protect those in need. Doing Bad by Doing Good argues that epistemic constraints and perverse political incentives contribute to the ongoing failure of state-led efforts to alleviate suffering. The dilemma facing proponents of state-led humanitarian action is that the incentives inherent in political institutions encourage the expansion of humanitarian action beyond what can be realistically accomplished. The result is overly ambitious efforts which are likely to fail and impose significant costs on innocent people. In place of the dominant approach to state-led humanitarian action, Coyne argues for the importance of establishing an environment of economic freedom. In increasing the range of alternative choices open to people around the world, such an environment empowers individuals to improve their own lives, and the lives of others, through a process of experimentation and discovery.

His fourth book, Tyranny Comes Home: The Domestic Fate of U.S. Militarism (Stanford University Press, 2018, ISBN 978-1503605275), co-authored with Abigail R. Hall, examines the domestic consequences of foreign interventions. Specifically, the book tracks the consequences of unchecked government behavior overseas that would not be permissible within national borders. Emboldened by the relative weakness of governance abroad, the U.S. government is able to experiment with a broader range of social controls. Under certain conditions, these policies, tactics, and technologies are then re-imported to America, changing the national landscape and increasing the extent to which we live in a police state. Coyne and Hall call the pattern of domestic adoption of tactics applied abroad, due to limited constraints, "the boomerang effect." They consider a variety of rich cases that include the rise of state surveillance, the militarization of domestic law enforcement, the expanding use of drones, and torture in U.S. prisons.

In his fifth book, Manufacturing Militarism: U.S. Government Propaganda in the War on Terror, (Stanford University Press, 2021, ISBN 978-1503628366) also co-authored with Abigail R. Hall, they explain how propaganda operates in democratic politics and why it matters for citizens of democratic countries. They specifically focus on government-produced propaganda targeting the domestic populace within the United States in the post-9/11 period. They show that the U.S. government has purposefully provided partial or misleading information about the actual threats to the security of U.S. persons while contributing to a broader culture of militarism. Towards the end of the book, they offer potential institutional reforms that would limit the extent to which propaganda can distort the ability of the citizenry to form informed opinions.
