= Frédéric Sautet =

French economist

Frédéric E. Sautet
- Born: 1968 (age 57–58)

Academic work
- School or tradition: Austrian economics
- Institutions: George Mason University

Frédéric E. Sautet (French: [sotɛ]; born in 1968), is a French-American economist. He currently teaches at The Catholic University of America in Washington D.C.

== Biography ==
After studying at the Institut d’études politiques de Paris, Sautet received his doctorate in economics from the University of Paris (advisor: Pascal Salin). He pursued his postdoctoral studies at New York University under the auspices of Peter Boettke, Israel Kirzner and Mario Rizzo.

He has lecturered at the University of Paris, New York University, George Mason University, and is teaching at The Catholic University of America where he was the cofounder of the Ciocca Center for Principled Entrepreneurship and the academic director of the strategy and management area. He is now the academic director of the Political Economy program. He also founded and is the current director of the Röpke-Wojtyła Fellowship.

== Work and publications ==
Sautet's research comprises entrepreneurship theory and the market process, cluster theory, economic development, and institutional economics. He is the author of An Entrepreneurial Theory of the Firm, published by Routledge in 2000. He is the co-editor with Peter Boettke of the Collected Works of Israel Kirzner in ten volumes published by Liberty Fund.
