= Israel Kirzner =

American economist (born 1930)

Rabbi Israel Kirzner
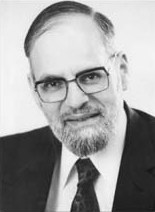
- Born: February 13, 1930 (age 96); London, England
- Children: 17

Academic background
- Doctoral advisor: Ludwig von Mises
- Influences: Wieser, Mises, Hayek

Academic work
- Discipline: Economics; Economic history
- School or tradition: Austrian School

Israel Meir Kirzner (also Yisroel Mayer Kirzner /ˈkɜːrznər/; born February 13, 1930) is a British-born American economist, historian, rabbi, and Talmudist closely identified with the Austrian School. Kirzner is known for his work on entrepreneurial economics, particularly the role of the entrepreneur as an alert arbitrageur and agent of economic discovery in the market process.

== Early life and education ==
The son of a well-known rabbi and Talmudist, Kirzner was born in London to a Jewish family and reached the United States by way of South Africa.

After studying at the University of Cape Town, South Africa in 1947–48, and with the University of London External Programme in 1950–51, Kirzner received his B.A. summa cum laude from Brooklyn College in 1954, and an MBA in 1955 and Ph.D. in 1957 from New York University, where he studied under Ludwig von Mises.

== Economics ==
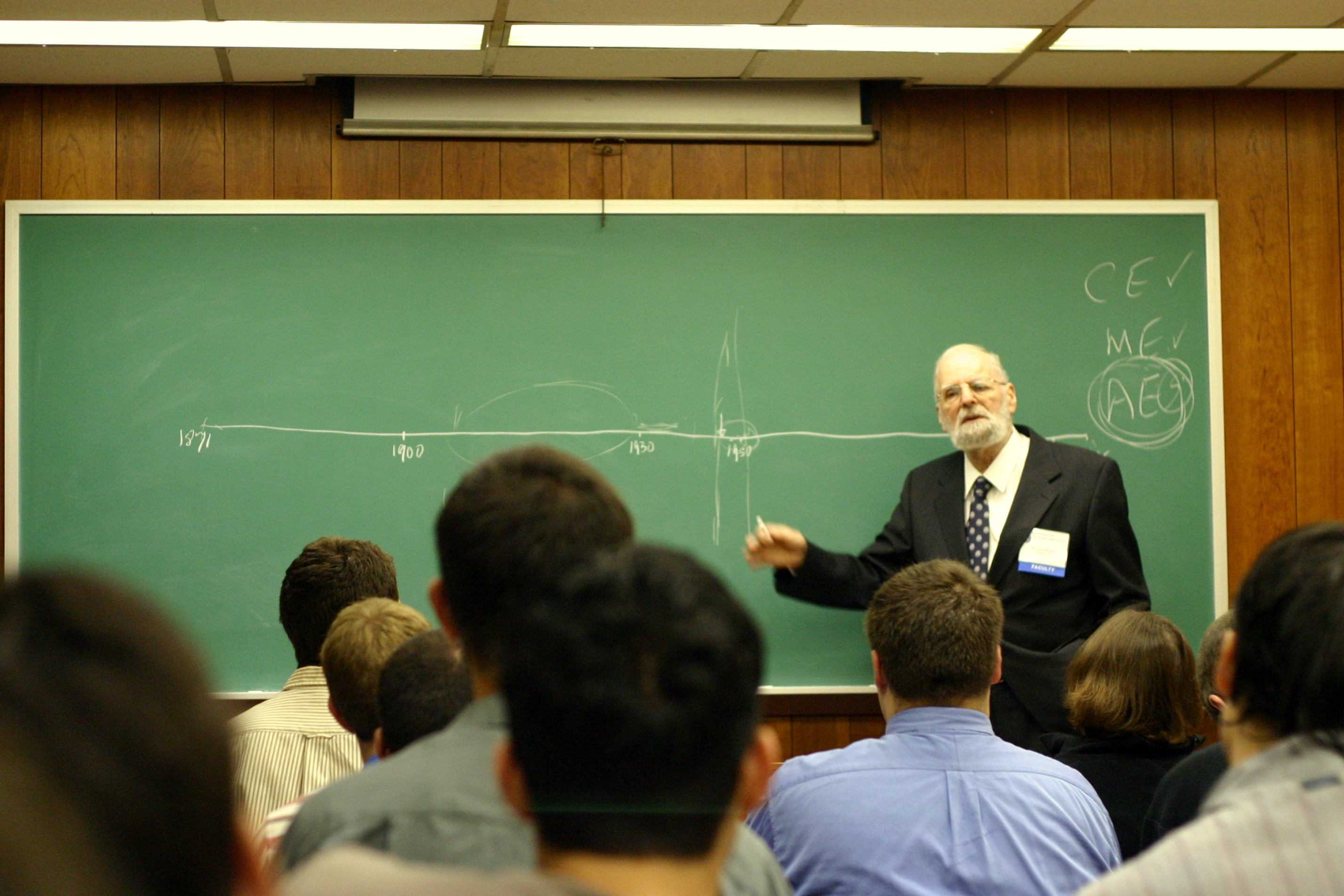
Lecture for the Foundation for Economic Education on July 28, 2006

Kirzner is emeritus professor of economics at New York University and a leading authority on Ludwig von Mises's thinking and methodology in economics. Kirzner's research on entrepreneurship economics is also widely recognized. His book, Competition and Entrepreneurship criticizes neoclassical theory for its preoccupation with the model of perfect competition, which neglects the important role of the entrepreneur in economic life. Kirzner's work integrating entrepreneurial action into neoclassical economics has been more widely accepted than nearly any other Austrian idea of the late twentieth century.

In 2006, Kirzner received the Global Award for Entrepreneurship Research "for developing the economic theory emphasizing the importance of the entrepreneur for economic growth and the functioning of the capitalist process." While Kirzner's ideas have greatly impacted the field of entrepreneurship studies, he has mainly been associated with the opportunity discovery view. However, a careful reading of Kirzner's work would suggest that his work on entrepreneurship can be split into two camps, one focusing on discovery and the other on creation.

Like Joseph Schumpeter, Kirzner's work can arguably be divided into Kirzner Mark I and Kirzner Mark II. Kirzner's major work is in the economics of knowledge and entrepreneurship and the ethics of markets. Kirzner has said that he agrees with Roger Garrison's statement that Kirzner's work takes the middle ground, as opposed to the recent, more extreme position of some Austrian School economists who deny the relevance of market equilibrium.

Universidad Francisco Marroquín granted him an Honorary Doctorate Degree for his contributions to economic theory. Honorary Doctoral Degrees at Universidad Francisco Marroquín UFM also named its Kirzner Entrepreneurship Center in his honor.

== Publications ==
Liberty Fund is currently publishing Israel Kizner's Collected Works in ten volumes under the supervision of Peter Boettke and Frederic Sautet. The first volume, The Economic Point of View, came out in December 2009, the second volume, Market Theory and the Price System, in May 2011 and the third volume, Essays on Capital, in June 2012. The fourth volume, Competition and Entrepreneurship, came out in 2013, which will also be the year of the 40th anniversary of the publication of the book.

Some of his works on economics include:

Books

- The Economic Point of View: An Essay in the History of Economic Thought. Kansas City: Sheed and Ward, 1960.
- Market Theory and the Price System. Van Nostrand, 1963.
- An Essay on Capital. A.M. Kelley, 1966.
- Competition and Entrepreneurship. Chicago, 1973. ISBN 0226437760.
- Perception, Opportunity and Profit: Studies in the Theory of Entrepreneurship. Chicago, 1979.
- Discovery and the Capitalist Process. University of Chicago Press, 1985. ISBN 0226437779.
- Discovery, Capitalism and Distributive Justice. Basil Blackwell, 1989.
- The Meaning of Market Process. Routledge, 1992. ISBN 0415137381, 0415068665.
- The Driving Force of the Market. Routledge, 2000. ISBN 0415228239.

Articles

- "Fifty Years of FEE – Fifty Years of Progress in Austrian Economics". The Freeman, Vol. 46, No. 5, May 1996. Archived from the original. Full issue available.
- "Reflections on the Misesian Legacy in Economics". The Review of Austrian Economics, Vol. 9, No. 2, 1996, pp. 143–154. doi:10.1007/BF01103334. ISSN 0889-3047. S2CID 144925158.
- "Entrepreneurial Discovery and The Competitive Market Process: An Austrian Approach". Journal of Economic Literature, Vol. 35, No. 1, March 1997, pp. 60–85. JSTOR 2729693.
- "Human Action, 1949: A Dramatic Episode in Intellectual History". The Freeman, Vol. 59, No. 7, September 2009, pp. 8–11. Archived from the original. Full issue available.

== Judaic scholar ==
Kirzner is also an ordained rabbi and Talmudic scholar and serves as the rabbi of the congregation once headed by his father in Brooklyn, New York. He is one of the most famous disciples of Rabbi Isaac Hutner, the late dean of the Yeshiva Rabbi Chaim Berlin, where he studied for many years during the same time that he obtained his academic training. Kirzner is an authority on Hutner's writings and is one of the few official editors of all sources that Hutner quotes.

== See also ==
- Milton Friedman
