= Citizens for a Sound Economy =

Conservative and libertarian think tank (1984–2004)

- Abbreviation: CSE
- Successor: FreedomWorks; Americans For Prosperity
- Formation: 1984
- Dissolved: 2004
- Legal status: 501(c)(4)
- Headquarters: Washington, D.C.
- Founders: Charles Koch and David Koch
- Chairman: Ron Paul (first); Dick Armey (last)
- Affiliations: Koch family foundations

Citizens for a Sound Economy (CSE) (1984–2004) was a conservative political group operating in the United States. It was established in 1984 by Charles and David Koch of Koch Industries. Ron Paul was appointed as the first chairman of the organization.

In 2002, the CSE designed its Tea Party movement website, though the movement did not take off until 2009. In 2003, Dick Armey became the chairman of CSE after retiring from Congress. In 2004, Citizens for a Sound Economy split into two new organizations, with Citizens for a Sound Economy being renamed as FreedomWorks, and Citizens for a Sound Economy Foundation becoming Americans for Prosperity. Both organizations played key roles in the Tea Party movement beginning in 2009.

== History ==
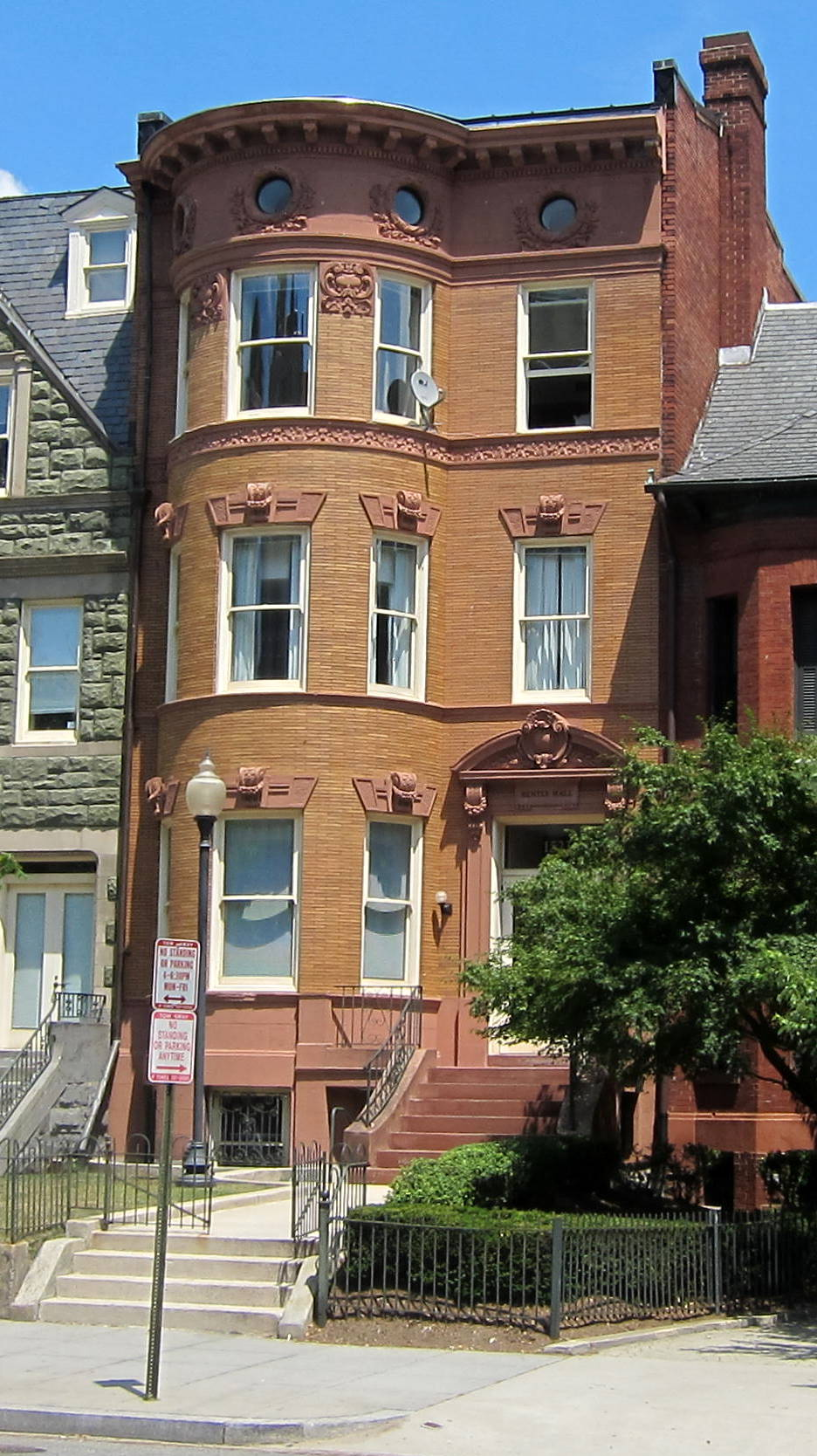
CSE's former headquarters in Washington, D.C.

Between 1986 and 1990, the Koch family foundations the Charles G. Koch Charitable Foundation, the David H. Koch Charitable Foundation, and the Claude R. Lambe Charitable Foundation granted a combined $4.8 million to the CSE.

The CSE was one of several organizations that was connected with non-profit organizations that the tobacco industry and other corporate interests worked with and provided funding for after the 1971 Powell Memorandum. The CSE was mainly funded by the tobacco, oil, energy and sugar industries, including Phillip Morris, General Electric, and Exxon. Other contributors included Microsoft and Hertz. The CSE "received almost $5 million from various Koch foundations between 1986 and 1990, and David Koch and several Koch Industries employees serve[d] as directors of CSE and the CSE Foundation."

CSE briefly assumed control of the financially troubled Tax Foundation and operated it as a subsidiary from CSE's offices until the split in 2000. Beginning in 1990, the Tax Foundation "operate[d] as a separate unit" of Citizens for a Sound Economy. By July 1991, the Tax Foundation was again operating as "an independent 501(c)(3) organization".

OpenSecrets has no contributions listed to CSE after 2000, when it received a total of about $35,000, and zero contributions in 1998.

In 2002, CSE designed and made public a "tea party" website. The website stated "our US Tea Party is a national event, hosted continuously online and open to all Americans who feel our taxes are too high and the tax code is too complicated". In 2003, Dick Armey became the chairman of CSE after retiring from Congress.

In 2004, Citizens for a Sound Economy split into FreedomWorks and Americans for Prosperity, according to the British newspaper The Guardian. Dick Armey stayed as chairman of FreedomWorks, while David Koch stayed as chairman of Americans for Prosperity.

On July 23, 2006, The Washington Post reported on the organization's tactics in signing up as members people who did not know about the organization, by enrolling them as members during unrelated insurance transactions in order to boost membership numbers. The group obtained about $638,000 and 16,000 members through the sale of insurance policies in this way, according to the report. When someone signed up for insurance through "Medical Savings Insurance Company", they were also automatically signed up for Citizens for a Sound Economy without their knowledge, the report asserted. Their information is subject to be rented out as the Medical Savings Insurance Company deemed fit, which is not uncommon for many groups who obtain client contact information. Critics suggested the effort as a way for this group to inflate their membership rosters, and more exactly, by taking dues from people with no interest in the groups' politics.

== Activity ==
The group produced more than 100 policy papers each year in its run, delivering them to many congressional offices, sending out thousands of pieces of mail, and getting coverage of its viewpoints in thousands of news articles around the United States. The group's representatives appeared on hundreds of radio and television shows and published hundreds op-ed articles arguing that "environmental conservation requires a commonsense approach that limits the scope of government," acid rain is a "so-called threat [that] is largely nonexistent," and global warming is "a verdict in search of evidence."

According to the conservative magazine Weekly Standard, CSE's greatest political success came in 1993 when it opposed Bill Clinton's proposal for a BTU energy tax. In addition to fighting tobacco taxes and healthcare reform, the CSE was a member organization of the Cooler Heads Coalition.

During the 2004 presidential election campaign, CNN reported that Oregon Citizens for a Sound Economy were urging George W. Bush supporters to help get Ralph Nader on the ballot in Oregon.
