= Mercatus Center =

American free-market-oriented think tank

- Founder: Richard Fink
- Established: 1980; 46 years ago
- Director: Benjamin Klutsey
- Staff: 233 (2024)
- Budget: Revenue: $48.3 million (2025); Expenses: $40.9 million (2025)
- Formerly called: Center for the Study of Market Processes
- Address: 3434 Washington Blvd., 4th Floor Arlington, Virginia 22201
- Coordinates: 38.8857°N 77.1018°W
- Interactive map of Mercatus Center
- Website: www.mercatus.org

The Mercatus Center is an American libertarian, free-market-oriented non-profit think tank. It is located at the George Mason University campus, but is privately funded and its employees are independent of the university. It is directed by Benjamin Klutsey and its board is chaired by American economist Tyler Cowen.

The center works with policy experts, lobbyists, and government officials to connect academic learning with real-world practice. Taking its name from the Latin word for market, the center advocates free-market approaches to public policy. The center supports deregulation on the federal level and has supported initiatives to reduce the number of federal regulations.

According to the 2017 Global Go To Think Tank Index Report (Think Tanks and Civil Societies Program, University of Pennsylvania), Mercatus is number 39 in the "Top Think Tanks in the United States" and number 18 of the "Best University Affiliated Think Tanks". The Koch family has been a major financial supporter of the organization since the mid-1980s. Charles Koch is an emeritus member of the group's board of directors.

== History ==
The Mercatus Center was founded by Richard Fink as the Center for the Study of Market Processes at Rutgers University. After the Koch family gave more than $30 million to George Mason University, the center moved there in the mid-1980s. It took its current name in 1999.

In 2001, the Office of Management and Budget asked for public input on which regulations should be revised or killed. Mercatus submitted 44 of the 71 proposals the OMB received.

In 2010, the center collaborated with EconStories to produce a parody rap video about the conflict of ideas between F. A. Hayek and John Maynard Keynes. A sequel, "Fight of the Century", was produced in 2011.

In 2012, Mercatus scholar Charles Blahous released a study saying that the Patient Protection and Affordable Care Act (PPACA) would worsen the federal deficit, contrary to the official Congressional Budget Office forecast. The study was generally criticized by supporters of the PPACA. Jeanne Lambrew, deputy assistant to the president for health policy, wrote, "This new math fits the old pattern of mischaracterizations about the Affordable Care Act when official estimates show the health care law reduces the deficit." Blahous defended the findings of his research.

Later that year, the Mercatus Center established the F.A. Hayek Program for Advanced Study in Philosophy, Politics, and Economics run under the supervision of Peter Boettke and Christopher Coyne and launched Marginal Revolution University, an online platform for teaching economics, run by Tyler Cowen and Alex Tabarrok.

In 2015, Mercatus launched its annual Ranking of the 50 States by Fiscal Conditions and started its Program on Monetary Policy.

In 2016, Mercatus launched its Program on the American Economy and Globalization, run by Daniel Griswold, which aims to help "the public and policymakers understand the benefits of an economy free from protectionist barriers against the international movement of goods, services, capital, ideas, and people."

In 2018, Mercatus announced that it "sponsored the development of a futures market based on [nominal gross domestic product] contracts with Hypermind, a UK-based consulting firm." As explained in the announcement: "Mercatus Center's Scott Sumner and David Beckworth have made the case that an alternative monetary policy approach, nominal gross domestic product (NGDP) level targeting, is superior to inflation targeting. NGDP is essentially the nation's total income. According to Sumner and Beckworth, instead of targeting inflation (general prices), the Federal Reserve's monetary policy should target the rate at which the nation's total income is expected to grow. NGDP level targeting will ensure that the right amount of money supply is provided to meet the economy's needs."

== Mission ==
The organization describes itself as "the world's premier university source for market-oriented ideas" and says it aims to bridge "the gap between academic ideas and real-world problems." By advancing knowledge about how markets can work to improve lives and individual freedoms, by training graduate students, conducting research, and applying economic principles, they hope to offer solutions to society's most pressing problems.

Mercatus currently runs the following research programs: The Project for the Study of American Capitalism; Technology Policy Project; State and Local Policy Project; Spending and Budget Initiative; Program on the American Economy and Globalization; Program on Monetary Policy; Program on Financial Regulation; and Program for Economic Research on Regulation.

Rob Stein, a Democratic strategist, has called Mercatus "ground zero for deregulation policy in Washington." The Wall Street Journal has called the Mercatus Center "the most important think tank you've never heard of".

The Mercatus Center is a 501(c)(3) non-profit and does not receive support from George Mason University or any federal, state, or local governments.

== Organizational structure ==
The Mercatus Center is located on George Mason University's Arlington Campus, and is affiliated with GMU's economics department. The provost of George Mason University has the power to appoint a faculty director to head the Mercatus Center.

=== Board of directors ===
Members of the board of directors include:

- Tyler Cowen, economist
- Donald J. Boudreaux, economist and professor
- Emily Chamlee-Wright, president and CEO of the Institute for Humane Studies
- Salen Churi, co-founder of Trust Ventures
- Richard Fink, former executive vice president of Koch Industries
- Brian Hooks, CEO and chairman of Stand Together
- Manuel H. Johnson, economist
- Charles G. Koch, co-owner, chairman and CEO of Koch Industries (emeritus)
- Vernon L. Smith, 2002 winner of the Nobel Memorial Prize in Economic Sciences
- Katherine Boyle, General Partner at Andreessen Horowitz
- Sam Bowman
- Virgil Storr

== Publications ==
Scholars affiliated with the Mercatus Center have published hundreds of journal articles and research papers, with topics including government transparency, subsidies, taxation, regulation, corruption, and Austrian School economics. They have also provided more than 100 testimonies to Congress. Notable studies performed and books published include:

- "Tyranny Comes Home," published in 2018, assesses how, under certain conditions, U.S. policies, tactics, and technologies deployed abroad via military interventions "are re-imported to America, changing the national landscape and increasing the extent to which we live in a police state." The authors "examine this pattern―which they dub 'the boomerang effect'―considering a variety of rich cases that include the rise of state surveillance, the militarization of domestic law enforcement, the expanding use of drones, and torture in U.S. prisons."
- "Permissionless Innovation," a book by scholar Adam Thierer, which argues that if "the precautionary principle," trumps "permissionless innovation" with regards to government's approach to technological innovation, then "the result will be fewer services, lower-quality goods, higher prices, diminished economic growth, and a decline in the overall standard of living."
- "How Are Small Banks Faring under Dodd-Frank?," a 2015 survey of approximately 200 small U.S. banks serving mostly rural and small metropolitan markets. The survey "included questions about specific regulatory and compliance activities, interactions with regulators, effects of particular regulations, changes in fees and revenue, and business strategy decisions since the passage of Dodd–Frank."
- "Annual Performance Report Scorecard" (2000–2009): Produced by the Mercatus Center's Government Accountability Project, these publications assess the annual reports released by the 24 federal agencies covered by the Chief Financial Officers Act. The reports, required by the Government Performance and Results Act of 1993 are rated for their demonstration of "transparency, public benefits, and leadership." The most recent publication, covering the 2008 fiscal year, ranked the reports from Labor, Veterans Affairs, and Transportation departments as the best, and those from SBA, Defense, and HUD as the worst. Only 13 of the departments' reports received a "satisfactory" score in this 2009 publication, which notes that agencies "whose policy views were evaluated as more liberal ... seem to score slightly better."
- "Freedom in the 50 States: An Index of Personal and Economic Freedom" ranks states according to how well they meet the center's ideals of personal and economic freedom. The 2011 rankings regarded New Hampshire, South Dakota, and Indiana as the freest, and New York, New Jersey, and California as the most restrictive. The 2013 rankings regarded North Dakota, South Dakota, and Tennessee as the freest, and New York, California, and New Jersey as the most restrictive. This index was later transferred to the Cato Institute.

== Scholars ==
Notable scholars at Mercatus include:

- Charles Blahous
- Peter Boettke
- Donald J. Boudreaux
- Bryan Caplan
- Tyler Cowen
- Christopher Coyne
- Steven Horwitz
- Arnold Kling
- Peter Leeson
- Maurice McTigue
- Russ Roberts
- Scott Sumner
- Alex Tabarrok
- Lawrence H. White
- Bruce Yandle
- Todd Zywicki

== Alumni ==
Notable former Mercatus scholars, students, and employees include:

- Brian Blase, former Special Assistant to the President for Healthcare Policy
- Susan Dudley
- Hester Peirce

== See also ==
- Good government organizations in the United States
