= Peter Leeson =

American economist (born 1979)

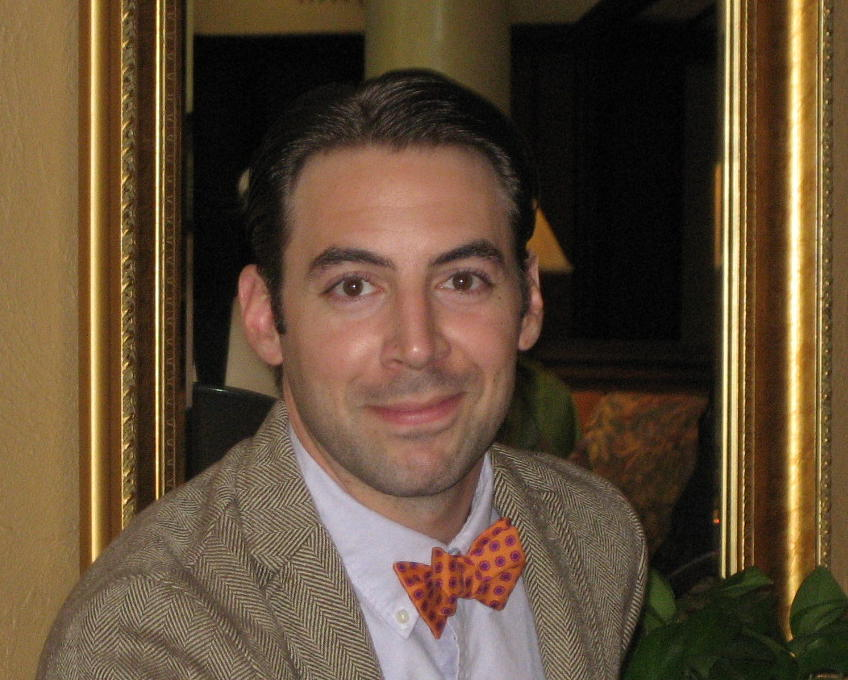
- Born: July 29, 1979 (age 47)
- Spouse: Ania Leeson

Academic background
- Education: Hillsdale College; George Mason University
- Influences: Gary Becker, Ludwig von Mises, George Stigler, Gordon Tullock

Academic work
- Discipline: Economics
- Institutions: University of Chicago (2009–2010); George Mason University (2007–present); West Virginia University (2005–2007)
- Notable ideas: The Invisible Hook
- Website: Information at IDEAS / RePEc

Peter T. Leeson (born July 29, 1979) is an American economist and the Duncan Black Professor of Economics and Law at George Mason University. In 2012 Big Think listed him among "Eight of the World's Top Young Economists". He is a Fellow of the Royal Society of Arts.

Leeson is known for extending rational choice theory into unusual domains, such as to the study of bizarre rituals and superstitions, and to the behavior of Caribbean pirates. As Freakonomics coauthor Steven Levitt put it, "the amazing thing about Pete Leeson is that he takes these crazy topics and through a brilliant mix of meticulous historical research, data gathering, and creative economic thinking he shows that these seemingly nonsensical practices actually make a whole lot of sense... I can't think of another economist whose work has so consistently blown my mind." According to the American Institute for Economic Research's Art Carden, "to the extent that the economics profession has an heir to Gary Becker in the sense of pushing economic analysis as far as we think it will go and then discovering it will go a little farther, it's Leeson."

In 2022 Leeson received the Adam Smith Award, previously given to Nobel Laureates Douglass North, James M. Buchanan, Vernon L. Smith, and Elinor Ostrom.

Formerly, he held faculty positions at West Virginia University and the University of Chicago.

== Life and education ==
Leeson began writing about economics as a teenager:

In 1997, Mackinac Center for Public Policy President Lawrence W. Reed read an articulate letter to the editor...that scolded a previous writer for poor economic analysis of a public policy issue. Reed contacted the writer, assuming that he was a professor of some sort. In fact, the author was a 17-year-old Dow High School student, Peter Leeson.

As an 18-year-old, Leeson was invited by an economics professor at Northwood University to lecture in his course.

Leeson earned a B.A. in economics at Hillsdale College in 2001. He received his Ph.D. in economics at George Mason University in 2005 under the direction of Peter Boettke. In 2003–2004, he was a visiting fellow in political economy and government at Harvard University. In 2005, he was the F.A. Hayek Fellow at the London School of Economics.

Leeson proposed marriage to his now-wife, Ania, in the preface of his book The Invisible Hook: The Hidden Economics of Pirates. Ania also appears as one of the characters in his book WTF?! An Economic Tour of the Weird. Leeson has a tattoo of a supply and demand curve on his right biceps and is an avid cigar smoker. He illustrated his book WTF?!

== Work ==
=== Economics of piracy ===
Leeson's Invisible Hook argues that Caribbean pirates developed an early form of constitutional democracy and engaged in behaviors such as flying the Jolly Roger because doing so maximized their profit.

In the wake of the Maersk Alabama hijacking, his work on piracy drew substantial media attention. In an article published by National Public Radio, he said that "early 18th century pirates, men like Blackbeard, Bartholomew Roberts, and John Rackham, were not only thieves. They were also early experimenters with some of the modern world's most cherished values, such as liberty, democracy, and equality."

Although Leeson is careful to note that he does not praise the criminal actions of pirates, he argues that their self-organization is a useful illustration of how even criminal conduct is based on rational self-interest. In an interview published by The New York Times, Leeson summarized his thesis:

The idea of the invisible hook is that pirates, though they're criminals, are still driven by their self-interest. So they were driven to build systems of government and social structures that allowed them to better pursue their criminal ends.... The reason that the criminality is driving these structures is because they can't rely on the state to provide those structures for them. So pirates, more than anyone else, needed to figure out some system of law and order to make it possible for them to remain together long enough to be successful at stealing.

CGP Grey's two-video animated YouTube adaptation of Leeson's Invisible Hook has been viewed more than 10 million times.

=== Economics of bizarre rituals and superstitions ===
Leeson's book WTF?! argues that practices which seem senseless, such as trial by ordeal, trial by combat, and oracular divination, are in fact clever solutions devised by people to overcome social problems. A recurrent theme in his work is that "people—all of them, regardless of time or place, religion or culture, wealth, poverty, or anything else—are rational." Similarly, he maintains that all institutions, including those "that seem obviously inefficient—and, indeed, sometimes downright absurd—are in fact, on closer inspection, efficient and not so absurd after all."

Steven Levitt has described Leeson's book as "Freakonomics on steroids" and described Leeson as "one of the most creative young economists around." Tim Harford called Leeson's WTF?! "one of the most original books I've ever read."

=== Economics of anarchy ===
Leeson has written extensively on what he describes as "the economics of anarchy" and has suggested that "self-governance works better than you think." Avinash Dixit described Leeson's book Anarchy Unbound: Why Self-Governance Works Better Than You Think as "an eye-opener," and Robert Ellickson described it as "masterly." According to Leeson:

[T]he case for anarchy derives its strength from empirical evidence, not theory.... Despite... significant arenas of anarchy we do not observe perpetual world war in the absence of global government, shriveling international commerce in the absence of supranational commercial law, or even deteriorating standards of living in Somalia. On the contrary, peace overwhelmingly prevails between the world's countries, international trade is flourishing, and Somali development has improved under statelessness.

The Atlas Economic Research Foundation's Fund for the Study of Spontaneous Orders awarded Leeson its Hayek Prize in 2006, noting of his scholarship that:

Leeson has concentrated on the study of the problem of order where no formal law exists, showing how in such diverse situations as trade among strangers, banditry in colonial West Central Africa and modern Somalia, and life in pirate societies over the ages often informal rules emerge that allow order to be preserved without heavy-handed government control.

== Views ==
Leeson stated in a column regarding Ronald Reagan and foreign policy, "Reagan's foreign policy was predicated on the use of military intervention to achieve the political and economic outcomes his administration was after in foreign countries. I am advocating precisely the opposite—that no such intervention would be desirable."

== Books ==
- Legal Systems Very Different from Ours. (with D. Friedman and D. Skarbek). Independently published, 2019. ISBN 978-1793386724
- WTF?! An Economic Tour of the Weird. Stanford: Stanford University Press, 2017. ISBN 978-1503600911
- The Economic Role of the State. (ed. with P. Boettke). Cheltenham: Edward Elgar, 2015.
- Anarchy Unbound: Why Self-Governance Works Better Than You Think. Cambridge: Cambridge University Press, 2014. ISBN 978-1107025806
- The Secrets of Pirate Management. Princeton: Princeton Shorts, 2012. ISBN 978-1400843169
- The Invisible Hook: The Hidden Economics of Pirates. Princeton: Princeton University Press, 2009. ISBN 978-0-691-13747-6
- Media, Institutional Change, and Economic Development. (with C. Coyne). Cheltenham: Edward Elgar, 2009.
- The Legacy of Ludwig von Mises: Theory and History. (ed. with P. Boettke). 2 vols. Aldershot: Edward Elgar, 2006. ISBN 978-1-84064-402-9
