= Lawrence Reed =

American economist (born 1953)

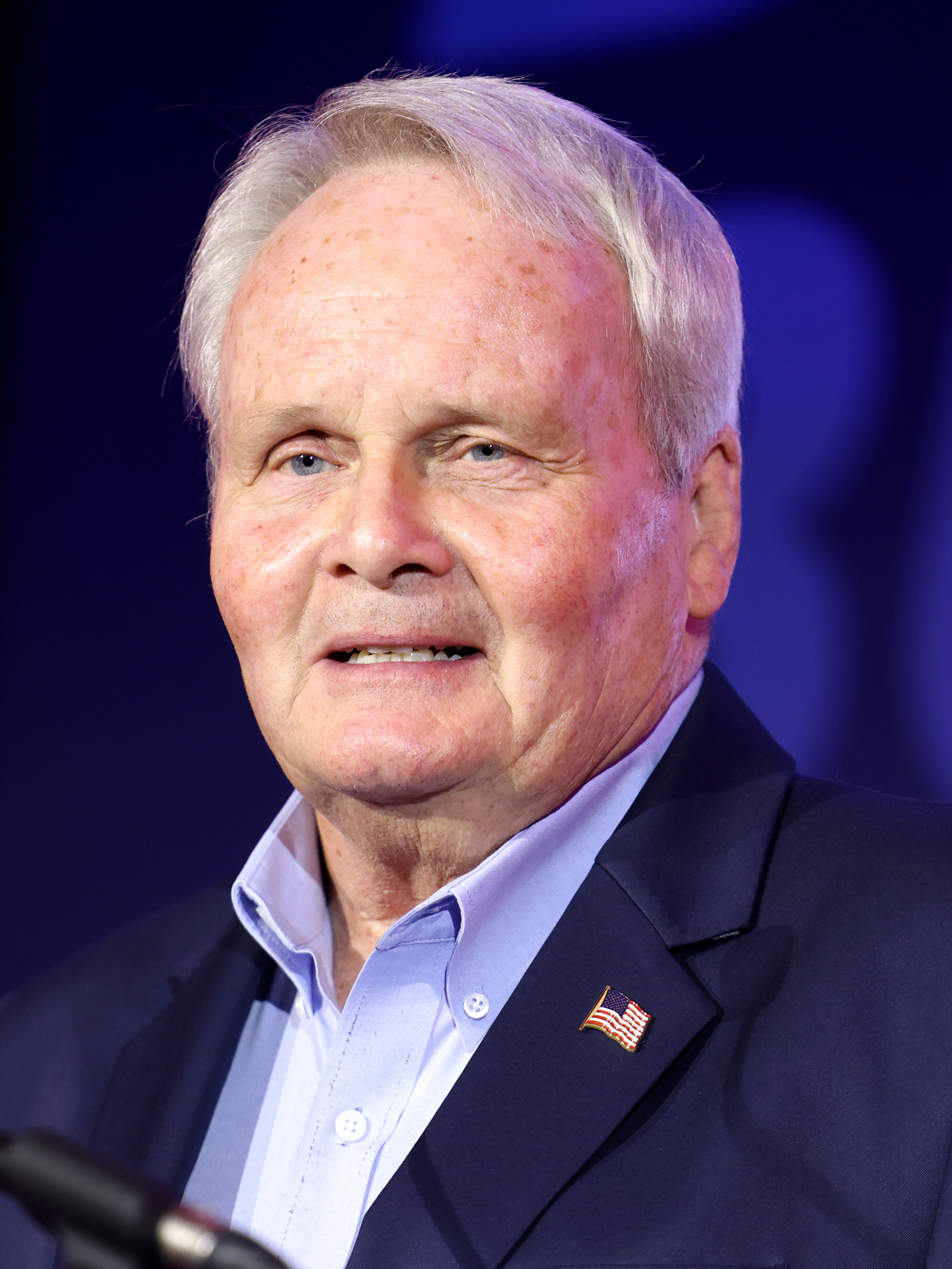
- Reed in 2026
- Born: September 29, 1953 (age 73); Pennsylvania, U.S.

Academic background
- Education: Grove City College; Slippery Rock University of Pennsylvania
- Influences: Friedrich Hayek; Ludwig von Mises; Henry Hazlitt; Frédéric Bastiat

Academic work
- Discipline: Public policy, libertarianism
- School or tradition: Austrian School
- Institutions: Northwood University; Mackinac Center for Public Policy; Foundation for Economic Education
- Website: www.lawrencewreed.com

Lawrence W. Reed (born September 29, 1953), also known as Larry Reed, is an American author, economist of the Austrian school, and an advocate of the free-market. He is the president emeritus of the conservative libertarian think tank The Foundation for Economic Education (FEE), where he served as president from 2008 to 2019. Reed was the founding president of the Mackinac Center for Public Policy, leading it from 1987 to 2008 and chaired the economics department at Northwood University in Michigan from 1982 to 1984.

Reed received the Order of Merit of the Republic of Poland, the highest distinction Poland bestows upon a foreigner, for his decades of support for the Polish anti-communist cause, including his crucial assistance to the anti-communist underground in the 1980s.

== Early life and education ==
Reed was born and raised in Pennsylvania, United States.

Reed has cited the 1968 event between the Czechs and the Soviets known as the "Prague Spring" as the genesis for his interest in liberty, and has referred to the Czech cause as a "flowering of liberty". As a result of interactions with FEE in his teen years, Reed became exposed to the ideas of Friedrich Hayek, Ludwig von Mises, and others from the Austrian school of economics.

Reed holds a Bachelor of Arts degree in economics from Grove City College (1975) and a Master of Arts degree in history from Slippery Rock University of Pennsylvania (1978).

== Career ==
=== Academics and politics (1977–1984) ===
From 1977 to 1984, Reed taught economics at Midland, Michigan's Northwood University, serving as chairman of the Department of Economics from 1982 to 1984. While at Northwood, Reed designed the university's dual major in economics and business management and founded its annual "Freedom Seminar".

In 1982, he was the Republican candidate for U. S. Congress in Michigan's 10th district.

Reed's interests in political and economic affairs have taken him as a freelance journalist to 81 countries on six continents since 1985. Over the past twenty-five years, he has reported on hyperinflation in South America, black markets from behind the Iron Curtain, reforms and repression in China and Cambodia, and civil war inside Nicaragua and Mozambique. Additionally, he spent time with the Contra rebels during the Nicaraguan civil war; and lived for two weeks with Mozambique rebel forces at their bush headquarters in 1991, while the country was engaged at the height of their guerrilla conflict. Among many foreign experiences, Reed visited Cambodia in 1989 with his late friend, Academy Award winner Haing S. Ngor.

In 1986, while traveling with the Polish anti-communist underground, Reed was arrested and detained by border police. Reed's articles have appeared in The Wall Street Journal, Christian Science Monitor, Baltimore Sun, Detroit News, Detroit Free Press and USA Today, and others.

=== Mackinac Center for Public Policy (1987–2008) ===
From 1987 to 2008, Reed served as the president of the Mackinac Center for Public Policy. According to The New York Times, under his leadership, the Mackinac Center emerged as one of the largest and most influential state-level policy institutes in the United States. The concept of the Overton window was developed during the time that Reed was president of the Mackinac Center. The "Overton window" refers to the range of ideas which are considered culturally and politically fringe to mainstream, and when a subject matter moves along this spectrum it is considered to have changed its status along the "Overton window". According to the Mackinac Center, "The Overton Window was developed in the mid-1990s by the late Joseph P. Overton, who was senior vice president at the Mackinac Center for Public Policy at the time of his death in 2003."

Long active in Michigan policy, Reed was appointed in 1993 by the state's then-Governor John Engler (R) to the Headlee Amendment Blue Ribbon Commission. The commission was established as part of the state's 1978 "Headlee amendment" for the purpose of limiting local and state government spending. It was officially abolished in 2004 by former Michigan Governor Jennifer Granholm.

In 1994, Reed was named to the Secchia Commission on Total Quality Government, a task force charged by Governor Engler to streamline Michigan state government. Engler and many of his administration's officials frequently cited the work of the Mackinac Center as influential in shaping administration policies.

During a 2003 address on the floor of the House of Representatives, Congressman Ron Paul paid tribute to Reed, acknowledging him as "one of America's leading advocates for liberty", and remarked that Reed's writings "reflect his unswerving commitment to limited government and the free market as the best way to promote human happiness."

In December 2007, the Heritage Foundation named Reed as a visiting senior fellow.

=== Foundation for Economic Education (since 2008) ===
On September 1, 2008, Reed became president of the Foundation for Economic Education (FEE). FEE, founded in 1946 by Leonard Read, has been recognized as the first not-for-profit organization of its kind, familiarizing people with free-market economics. As president, Reed hoped to reassert FEE's position as a "mothership" for the freedom movement at large. According to Reed, "FEE believes a free society is not only possible, it is imperative because there is no acceptable alternative for a civilized people. Our vision for the future is that through education, men and women will understand the moral, philosophic and economic principles that undergird a free society. They will appreciate the direct connection between those principles and their material and spiritual welfare. They will strive to pass those principles on from one generation to the next."

== Writing ==
In 1981, he published the short Great Myths of the Great Depression, which criticized various conceptions about the American Great Depression.

In 2012, he published A Republic – If We Can Keep It, is a collection of essays by Reed and historian Burton W. Folsom, Jr. that surveys the economic history of the United States and the modern world.

In 2019, he published Striking the Root: Essays on Liberty, a bundling of works on the topic of government use of force previously published in the former magazine of FEE, The Freeman.

In 2020, he published Was Jesus a Socialist?, where he argued Jesus's teachings, his support for personal choice and charity and opposition to forced redistribution do not align with socialism and Biblical stroies like Parable of the Workers support voluntary contracts and private property.

Reed's other books include Lessons from the Past: The Silver Panic of 1893, and Private Cures for Public Ills: The Promise of Privatization, both published by the Foundation for Economic Education, and When We Are Free, with Dale M. Haywood.

== Honors ==
Reed was awarded an honorary Doctorate of Public Administration from Central Michigan University in 1994, and an honorary Doctorate of Laws from Northwood University in 2008. Reed is also the recipient of the Grove City College Distinguished Alumni Award.

Reed received the Order of Merit of the Republic of Poland, the highest distinction Poland bestows upon a foreigner, from then-president of Poland Andrzej Duda⁣ in 2023⁣⁣⁣. The award recognized Reed's decades of support for the Polish anti-communist cause, including his crucial assistance to the anti-communist underground in the 1980s and his efforts to promote free-market ideas in Poland.
