= Richard D. McLellan =

Lawyer and professor at Michigan State University

Richard McLellan
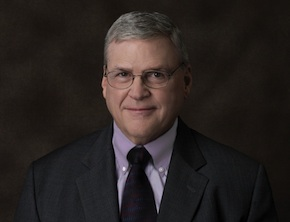
- Born: Paw Paw, Michigan
- Education: Michigan State University University of Michigan
- Occupation: Attorney
- Website: richardmclellan.com

Richard D. McLellan is a lawyer at McLellan Law Offices PLLC. He has served as Chairman of the Michigan Law Revision Commission since 1986. He argued on the side of the appellee in the United States Supreme Court case Austin v. Michigan Chamber of Commerce, 494 U.S. 652 (1990).

== Education ==
McLellan received his Bachelor of Arts in 1964 from Michigan State University Honors College with a degree in advertising. He received his law degree from the University of Michigan Law School in 1967.

== Government career ==
McLellan began his professional career as an administrative assistant to Michigan Governor William Milliken and as acting director of the Michigan Office of Drug Abuse. President Gerald Ford appointed him as an advisor to the Commissioner of the Food and Drug Administration as a member of the National Advisory Food and Drug Committee of the U.S. Department of Health, Education and Welfare. In 1990, he served as Transition Director to then Michigan Governor-elect John Engler. In 2007, he was selected by the Secretary of Defense to participate in a tour of the United States Pacific Command as part of the Joint Civilian Orientation Conference ("JCOC"). In 2010, McLellan served as Chairman of the Transition Team for the newly elected Michigan Attorney General Bill Schuette.

McLellan has been appointed by the Governor of Michigan to the following positions:

- Chair, Michigan Film Advisory Commission
- Chairman, Michigan Corrections Commission
- Designated as an Emergency Interim Successor to the Governor (1991-2002)
- Governor's Representative, Upper Great Lakes Regional Economic Development Commission
- Governor's Representative, State Safety Commission
- Member, Governor's Victimless Crimes Task Force
- Member, Michigan Jobs Commission
- Member, Michigan Export Development Authority
- Member, Michigan International Trade Authority
- Member, McPherson Commission On Charter Schools
- Acting Director, Michigan Office of Drug Abuse
- McLellan was named by Supreme Court Chief Justice Maura Corrigan to the Underground Economy Task Force.

== Education policy ==
McLellan has been active in public education and school choice. He has served as legal counsel to TEACH Michigan, a school choice organization, and in that capacity assisted in drafting Michigan's charter school law. He assisted in implementing the law and successfully defended its constitutionality in front of the Michigan Supreme Court. He was a co-author of the study "The Universal Tuition Tax Credit: A Proposal to Advance Parental Choice in Education," published by the Mackinac Center for Public Policy. McLellan has been a supporter of allowing parents to choose the kind of education their child receives. He helped draft the Kids First Yes! ballot proposal. This proposal would have allowed school vouchers for students who are in "failing" school districts.

In 2011 and 2012, McLellan served as a volunteer education advisor to Michigan Governor Rick Snyder and was involved in drafting legislation to implement the Governor's proposed education reforms. He was asked to undertake a rewrite of Michigan's School Aid Act of 1979 and submitted a new forms of schools amendment to the School Code, 300+ page draft school financing bill, and confidential report to the Governor. Both the legislative proposals were highly controversial among traditional school interests. During the process, McLellan engaged in an online debate with John Austin, president of State Board of Education.

McLellan has also been active in encouraging the use of technology in public education. He formerly served on the board of the Michigan Information Technology Network (MITN). In 2012, he encouraged the creation of and arranged financing for an Education Reform Advisory Team designed as "volunteer challenge to design a wholly new public education experience that bundles the most advanced technology tools for learning to apply, in the public education space, concepts that are being applied throughout society – using technology to both reduce unit costs and increase quality and performance at the same time." State Board of Education President John Austin, however, decried that effort, calling it: "an ideological and political agenda to create a for-profit marketplace for schools and to diminish and replace the existing public education system." The MEA and other education groups opposed the idea, calling it a secret "skunk works" project. Subsequently, Governor Snyder the governor asked state superintendent Mike Flanagan to take over the project, and to focus on using technology to make schools less costly and more efficient. The new effort is named the Education Technology Work Group.

McLellan serves as member of the Board of Trustees of the Michigan Council on Economic Education.

While serving as an administrative assistant to Michigan Governor William G. Milliken, he directed signature gathering for an educational reform ballot proposal and later represented the Michigan Education Association (MEA) in drafting another education funding constitutional amendment.

== Higher education ==
McLellan is an Adjunct Associate Professor at Michigan State University College of Communication Arts and Sciences. He formerly served as adjunct professor of international studies at MSU. He is a member of the advisory board for the James H. and Mary B. Quello Center for Telecommunication Management and Law, a research facility at Michigan State University. He was a member of the board of the Imagine Fund (IFund), a scholarship granting organization, is to ensure access and expand equal opportunity to higher education for students based on their race, color, sex, ethnicity, national origin, and/or other cultural characteristics.

At the request of Michigan Gov. John Engler, McLellan helped establish and served as President of the Michigan Japan Foundation, established to provide private support for the Japan Center for Michigan Universities (JCMU), a program established in Japan by Michigan's 15 public universities.

He also served on the University Investment Commission, and the Michigan Information Technology Network (MITN).

McLellan was the Michigan State University's College of Law commencement speaker for the Spring 2010 graduating class.

McLellan serves with three public interest law firms established by the Mackinac Center, the Native Nations Foundation, and the Oxford Foundation.

== Elections and campaign finance ==
In 1990, McLellan was appointed by President George H. W. Bush as a Presidential Observer to the elections in the People's Republic of Bulgaria. These were the first free elections in the country after 45 years of communist control. Again, in 1996, he acted as an observer for the Bulgarian National elections. In February 1999, he also served as an observer for the Nigerian National elections with the International Republic Institute Delegation headed by the then retired General Colin Powell. McLellan has been active in Republican Party politics for many years, starting as chairman of the MSU Romney Volunteers in 1962. In addition, his legal practice has included extensive representation of political candidates, political action committees, ballot question campaigns, SuperPACS, and 501(c)(4) organizations. In 2008, he served on the National Steering Committee of Lawyers for McCain and he served as Chairman of the Michigan Lawyers for Bush-Cheney in 2000 and 2004. In 2010 he served as the Lead Negotiator for the Michigan Republican Party Debate Commission. In 2012, McLellan served as an officer of the ballot committee opposing Proposal 2, the labor union-sponsored collective bargaining proposal rejected by the voters.

== Professional experience and leadership ==
McLellan started practicing law in the office of Joseph C. Cox in Fowlerville, Michigan, and served briefly as assistant prosecuting attorney in Livingston County, Michigan. In 1973, following four years on the Michigan Governor's staff, McLellan started a private law practice, McLellan, Schlaybaugh and Whitbeck, in Lansing, Michigan. The firm combined practices with Dykema, Gossett, Spencer, Goodnow & Trigg (Dykema Gossett PLLC) in 1982. McLellan remained a partner there until he retired in 2007. While at Dykema, he was the head of the firm's Government Policy and Practice Group and the Managing Member of the firm's Lansing Office. During this time he also served one term on the firm's Executive Committee. He served as a legislative consultant to the Campaign for Justice promoting indigent criminal defense funding. He is a former member of the board of trustees for the Michigan State University College of Law, where he served as chair of a Special Committee On Tenure. The Supreme Court appointed McLellan to two terms as a member of the Board of Commissioners of the State Bar of the State of Michigan, where he served as co-chair of the Justice Initiatives Committee. He was among 28 prominent lawyers and judges as members of the 2009 Judicial Crossroads Task Force to review the structure of the State Bar.

He received a special tribute from the University of Detroit-Mercy Law School for his assistance in removing residency requirements for practicing law. McLellan was appointed by the Governor as chairman of the Qualifications Review Committee for federal judges and U.S. attorneys for the Sixth Circuit Court of Appeals, the Western District and the Eastern District of Michigan. He is a board member of American Justice Partnership and a member of the advisory board of the Michigan Chapter of the Federalist Society.

== Corporate and business leadership ==
McLellan has been an independent trustee for Jackson National Life Series Trust, an open-ended variable annuity equity fund launched and managed by Jackson National Asset Management, LLC since December 2003. He is chairman of Africa Continental Holdings, L.L.C., a consulting firm focusing on sub-Sahara Africa. He is currently the corporate director at World Wide Motion Pictures Corporation. He formerly served on the boards of ITC Holdings (NYSE:ITC). He has served as chairman of the Michigan Competitive Telecommunications Providers Association and as secretary/treasurer of the Michigan Alliance for Competitive Telecommunication. Previously he served as a director of Manufacturers Life Insurance Company of Michigan, Crown America Life Insurance Company, and Mercantile & General Life Reinsurance Company of America. He is a former director of Michigan Information and Research Service, Inc. (MIRS).

== Public service ==
McLellan is a participant in many community service organizations. He is a member of the board of governors for the Cranbrook Institute of Science; McLellan is a founding member of the Mackinac Center for Public Policy, a free-market think tank operating in Michigan for over 30 years, and sits on the Board of Directors. He currently is on the board of directors for the Cornerstone Foundation, the Native Nations Foundation, the Oxford Foundation, the Mackinac Center for public Policy, and the Michigan Political History Society. He is the former president of the Library of Michigan Foundation and the Michigan/Japan Foundation, the Arthritis Foundation Michigan Chapter, and the City Club of Lansing. He is a former member of both the Lansing Mayor's Regionalization Initiative and the Lansing Mayor's Council of Economic Advisors. He is also a former chairman of the board of the Michigan Chamber of Commerce.

== African involvement ==
For over 30 years McLellan has been involved in supporting development in Africa. He currently serves as the chairman of the Council for Africa Infrastructure. He is a trustee of the Rawlings Foundation established by Jerry John Rawlings, former president of the Republic of Ghana and in 2007 served as an advisor to the Transitional Government of Somalia. He participated in the trade mission to Africa led by U.S. Commerce Secretary Ron Brown. In 2001, McLellan was appointed as a leader in the Africa Business Advisory Board established by U.S. Congressman J.C. Watts Jr. where he helped organize and participate in a business delegation to West Africa. McLellan participated in the development and construction of a 330 MW combined cycle power plant at Takoradi, in Ghana, to maximize industrial growth with the option of expansion to a 660 MW plant on behalf of a major U.S.-based utility. Also in 2001, he was honored for his years of working with the Igbo people in Africa by being named a chief with the title of the Obinwanne of Ogbunike, by H.R.H. John Umenyiora, the Igwe of Ogbunike.

== Awards and recognition ==
U.S. News Media Group and Best Lawyers have included Richard D. McLellan and his McLellan Law Offices in both the 2013 "Best Law Firms" and The Best Lawyers in America rankings, providing a comprehensive view of the U.S. legal profession that is unprecedented both in the range of firms represented and in the range of qualitative and quantitative data used to develop the rankings.

McLellan Law Offices was listed as a Tier 1 firm in the area of Administrative/Regulatory Law. In addition, Richard McLellan was selected by his peers to be included in The Best Lawyers in America, 19th edition for his work in the practice area of Administrative/Regulatory Law.

McLellan was listed as one of the country's top lawyers by Super Lawyers, a nationally distributed magazine, in 2006 and 2007. The Best Lawyers in America named him one of the top lawyers in 2009. Richard McLellan has been recognized as among the most prominent and influential citizens in Michigan. Dawson Bell of the Detroit Free Press reported:

"He's seldom seen in the state Capitol, and less likely to be noticed. Take a look at someone who may well be the most influential person in Michigan you never heard of."

2007 Distinguished Brief Award, Thomas M. Cooley Law Review, for Brief on Appeal - Intervening Appellant Little Traverse Bay Bands of Odawa Indians, Michigan Supreme Court Docket No. 129822 (regarding the validity of the amendment provision of the Michigan tribal-state gaming compacts under the Separation of Powers Clause of the Michigan Constitution)

Named 2006 & 2007, 2009 Michigan Super Lawyer by Law & Politics

Small Business Advocate of the Year, Small Business Association

Lawyer of the Year, Lawyers Weekly

Robert A. Taft Award

Award from the Michigan Association of Public School Academies (MAPSA)

== Notable Court Cases ==
TOMAC v. State of Michigan (TOMAC I), 471 Mich. 306, 685 N.W.2d 221 (2004), cert. denied, ____ U.S. ____ (February 22, 2005), in the Michigan Supreme Court upholding legislative authority to enter into gaming compacts with Indian tribes.

Taxpayers of Michigan Against Casinos v. State of Michigan (TOMAC II), 478 Mich. 99; 732 N.W.2d 487 (2007), upholding validity of amendment provision of Michigan tribal-state gaming compacts. The two cases are seminal cases upholding the sovereignty of Indians tribes and the power of the Legislature to engage in government-to-government negotiations with federally recognized tribes.

Council of Orgs. and Others for Educ. About Parochiaid, Inc. v. Governor, 455 Mich. 557, 566 N.W.2d 208 (1997), upholding Michigan's charter school law

== Austin v. Michigan Chamber/Citizens United ==
In Austin v. Michigan Chamber of Commerce, McLellan argued the Michigan Campaign Finance Act, which prohibited corporations from using treasury money to support or oppose candidates in elections, violated the First and Fourteenth Amendments. The Court upheld the restriction on corporate speech based on the notion that "[c]orporate wealth can unfairly influence elections," and the Michigan law still allowed the corporation to make contributions from a segregated fund. McLellan filed an amicus curiae for Citizens United v. Federal Election Commission, 558 U.S. 50 (2010), the case in which Austin was overturned.

== Legislation ==
=== Michigan's Medical Marijuana Law ===
McLellan, along with his former firm Dykema Gossett, helped write the Michigan Medical Marihuana Act (MMMA), which was approved by Michigan voters on November 4, 2008. He is quoted in the City Pulse as saying "We think there is a role in this emergent medical marijuana market for an entity that really focuses on the quality and issues related to those persons who most benefit medically from marijuana." He believes that there needs to be legitimacy in the relationship between doctor and patient so that medical marijuana can be properly tested and prescribed to meet patient needs.

=== Michigan's Stem Cell Amendment ===
McLellan was retained by The Cure Michigan Campaign to review law relating to Stem Cell regulation in Michigan and assisted in drafting a proposed constitutional amendment to guarantee embryonic stem cell research (Michigan's Stem Cell Legislation). The amendment was passed by Michigan voters on November, 4th 2008. He believed that this proposal provided enough regulation to make it enforceable by state and local authorities.

=== Charter Schools and Voucher Proposals ===
McLellan has been involved in drafting three significant school choice proposals: the Michigan charter school law, the universal tuition tax credit proposal of the Mackinac Center, and the Kids First Yes! voucher proposal. The Michigan Supreme Court upheld the public charter school law, but neither of the proposals to provide public funding to private schools has been successful.
