= M.J. Perry =

M. J. Perry may refer to:

- Malcolm Perry (physicist) (born 1951), theoretical physicist
- Mark J. Perry, American professor of economics and finance
- Matthew J. Perry (1921 – 2011), United States jurist and federal judge

== See also ==
- Perry (surname)
