= Burton W. Folsom Jr. =

American historian

Burton W. Folsom Jr. (born 1947, in Nebraska) is an American historian and author who held the Charles F. Kline chair in history and management at Hillsdale College from 2003 until his retirement in December 2016.

== Biography ==
Folsom received his B.A. from Indiana University in 1970, his M.A. from the University of Nebraska in 1973, and his doctorate in history from the University of Pittsburgh in 1976. Since 1988 he has edited Continuity: A Journal of History. He is a frequent columnist in the libertarian Freeman magazine and also contributes to other publications, writing in favor of free market economics and limited government. He taught American history at Murray State University in Kentucky from 1976 to 1994.

Folsom is a former associate of the Free Enterprise Institute and the Mackinac Center for Public Policy, both free market think tanks, and a frequent guest of the libertarian organization Foundation for Economic Education.

== Academic contributions ==
Folsom has written several books that argue against commonly held views about the role of capitalism in the social developments of the Industrial Revolution and the Gilded Age. He believes the term robber barons is a misnomer, and that many leaders in big business were constructive visionaries who benefited consumers and were integral to the development of industry.

In his book The Myth of the Robber Barons, Folsom distinguishes between political entrepreneurs, who ran inefficient businesses supported by government favors, and market entrepreneurs, who succeeded by providing better and lower-cost products or services, usually while facing vigorous competition.

Folsom identifies the following people as market entrepreneurs:

- John Jacob Astor
- James J. Hill
- John D. Rockefeller
- Charles M. Schwab
- Cornelius Vanderbilt

He regards these people as political entrepreneurs:

- Robert Fulton: steamboat inventor and submarine designer.
- Thomas McKenney
- Henry Villard
- Warren Buffett

Folsom writes about economics and US history for several large publications, including The Wall Street Journal and the National Review. In a 2010 Wall Street Journal editorial, Folsom argues that the New Deal did not contribute to economic recovery and may have actually exacerbated the Great Depression. Folsom argues that the New Deal did little more than trade temporary poverty relief for crippling tax rates and mountains of debt, and that the post-war recovery is best attributed to the rollback of taxes and regulations imposed under the New Deal.

Folsom has created several short videos for the conservative educational website Prager University. His lessons focus on the history of American economic development and entrepreneurs such as John D. Rockefeller:

- Why Is America So Rich?
- Why Private Investment Works and Government Investment Doesn't
- Rockefeller: The Richest American Who Ever Lived

== Bibliography ==
=== Articles ===
- "The Politics of Elites: Prominence and Party in Davidson County, Tennessee, 1835–1861." Journal of Southern History 39.3 (1973): 359–378. online
- "Party Formation and Development in Jacksonian America: The Old South." Journal of American Studies 7.3 (1973): 217–229.
- "Entrepreneurs and City Growth: Scranton and Carbondale as Case Studies." Business and Economic History (1980): 124–127.
- "Like Fathers, Unlike Sons: The Fall of the Business Elite in Scranton, Pennsylvania, 1880–1920." Pennsylvania History 47.4 (1980): 291–309. online
- "Tinkerers, Tipplers, and Traitors: Ethnicity and Democratic Reform in Nebraska during the Progressive Era." Pacific Historical Review 50.1 (1981): 53–75. online
- "Immigrant Voters and the Nonpartisan League in Nebraska, 1917–1920." Great Plains Quarterly (1981): 159–168. online
- "The Minimum Wage's Disreputable Origins." Wall Street Journal (1998): A-22.
- Boudreaux, Donald J., and Burton W. Folsom. "Microsoft and Standard Oil: Radical lessons for antitrust reform." The Antitrust Bulletin 44.3 (1999): 555–576.
- McCormick, Blaine, and Burton W. Folsom. "A survey of business historians on America's greatest entrepreneurs." Business History Review 77.4 (2003): 703–716.

=== Books ===
- Entrepreneurs vs. the State (1989) ISBN 0-89526-573-7
- The Myth of the Robber Barons (1991) ISBN 0-9630203-1-5
- Empire Builders: How Michigan Entrepreneurs Helped Make America Great (1998) ISBN 1-890394-06-8
- No More Free Markets or Free Beer: The Progressive Era in Nebraska, 1900–1924 (1999) ISBN 0-7391-0014-9
- Urban Capitalists: Entrepreneurs and City Growth in Pennsylvania's Lackawanna and Lehigh Regions 1800–1920 (2005) ISBN 0-940866-94-3
- New Deal or Raw Deal?: How FDR's Economic Legacy Has Damaged America (2008) ISBN 1-4165-9222-9
- FDR Goes to War: How Expanded Executive Power, Spiraling National Debt, and Restricted Civil Liberties Shaped Wartime America, 2011, ISBN 978-1-4391-8320-5
- A Republic – If We Can Keep It (with Lawrence Reed, CreateSpace, 2012)
