= The Invisible Hook =

2009 book by Peter Leeson

The Invisible Hook: The Hidden Economics of Pirates
- Cover, Published 2011
- Author: Peter T. Leeson
- Language: English
- Subject: Economics of piracy
- Genre: Economics
- Publisher: Princeton University Press
- Publication date: 2009
- Publication place: United States
- ISBN: 0-691-13747-1
- OCLC: 276340750

The Invisible Hook: The Hidden Economics of Pirates is a non-fiction book detailing the similarities between economics and piracy. Author Peter T. Leeson (born July 29, 1979), shows in this book how pirates instigated democratic practices for their mutual profit, ideas which preceded the methods of society in the 16th century.

Leeson is an economics professor who has been credited with several respected positions throughout his career. Growing up with a strong admiration for pirates, he was inspired by piracy and how it intertwined with economics. The Invisible Hook explores several economic phenomena, including signaling and branding. The book also explores other themes including the implementation of democracy and constitutions, as well as tolerance and the use of conscription.

The book has been academically lauded, with many scholars praising Leeson's work for the books’ interesting insights and well thought-out ideas. The book also has opposing evaluations which offer insight from different points of view.

== Author background ==
Peter Leeson, an American economist, had a love for pirates all his life. He grew up "pirate-obsessed". He cherished his skull ring from Disney World, appreciated the themes in "Goonies", and when he became an economics professor combined his favourite interests to his professional career. Leeson earned the title of a Fellow of the Royal Society of Arts, and after holding faculty positions at both West Virginia University and the University of Chicago, he rose to the position of the Duncan Black Professor of Economics and Law at George Mason University. Besides his teaching career, Leeson is known for exploring the obscure economic practices in different communities, including the democratic behaviour of pirates.

== Importance of the title ==
Leeson penned the title after Adam Smith’s “Invisible Hand” theory. Smith’s concept outlined that an individual pursuing his self-interest is led by an invisible hand to promote societal interest. The idea behind Leeson’s book is that pirates are also driven by their self-interest, however rather than generating wealth, the “invisible hook” destroys wealth and allows pirates to pillage more freely.

== Overview ==
This work is a chapter book containing Leeson’s earlier writings. It was written from an economical standpoint and explains why pirate practices and decisions were rational, through an economical way of thinking. Considered a “fascinating perspective” into the world of pirates, Leeson argues that pirate customs took the form of rational and democratic forward-thinking. The book’s chapters cover:

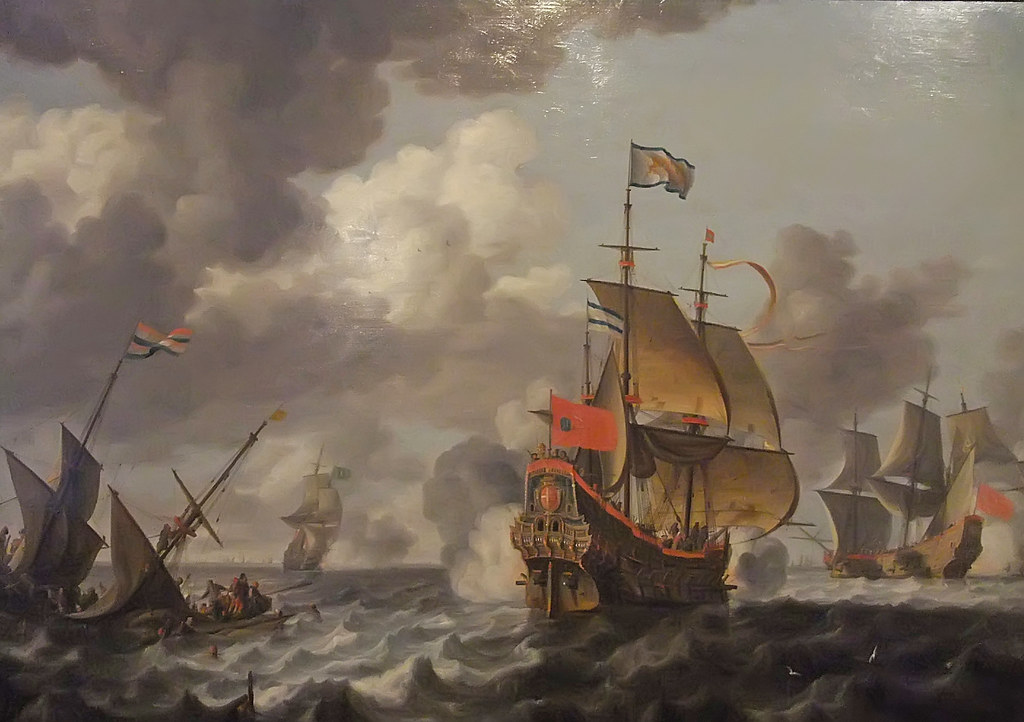
Battle between Pirates and the Dutch Navy by Bonaventura Peeters

- Chapter 1. The Invisible Hook: an introduction for the following chapters
- Chapter 2. Vote for Blackbeard – The Economics of Pirate Democracy: explores the origination of pirate democracy and how it was adopted from the experiences of sailors on merchant ships
- Chapter 3. An-arrgh-chy – The Economics of the Pirate Code: explains how pirates developed constitutions to govern their societies, effectively creating a democracy
- Chapter 4. Skull & Bones – The Economics of the Jolly Roger: identifies the economic phenomenon of "signaling" to the Jolly Roger flag
- Chapter 5. Walk the Plank – The Economics of Pirate Torture: details how the use of “brand names” by creating reputations of barbarity were implemented in order to ensure pirate revenue was not reduced at any level
- Chapter 6. Pressing Pegleg – The Economics of Pirate Conscription: investigates how pirates used conscription to fill their ranks by drafting sailors from vessels they overtook
- Chapter 7. Equal Pay for Equal Prey – The Economics of Pirate Tolerance: delves into pirate tolerance, and the integration of black bondsmen as free crew members on their ships, and how this tolerance was formed by the cost-benefit considerations
- Chapter 8. The Secrets of Pirate Management – discusses management in piracy and the lessons which can be learned
- Epilogue. Omnipresent Economics

== Summary ==
The Invisible Hook is a non-fiction story that reveals the democratic and economic forces which drove pirates. Leeson identifies economic ways of thinking and how they administered in actions of piracy, and how these customs resulted from a national response to the economic conditions of the 18th century. Leeson uncovered that pirates were “pioneers of democracy” (Weiss, 2008). Long before these methods were used in modern government, they were used effectively on pirate ships.

Lesson explores how pirates were the first developed “orderly and honesty societies” to rebel against 17th and 18th century governments. Pirates formed their own democratic ways, many of these adopted from experiences on merchant ships, and created a system of checks and balances to reduce the captain’s control over many aspects of pirate life.

Leeson also explains how the implementation of constitutions governed pirate societies through “pirate codes” – a system of rules – upon the ship. These rules prevented “negative externalities” and created a “rule of law” that placed captains on equal footing to their crew. Quartermasters were also elected to ensure the captain would not abuse his power. Captains were allowed to "control the governed", but not break the rules bound to themselves. Pirate leaders could be violent to their prisoners, but they respected their crew – they were "lawless" but "not without laws" (Leeson, 2009). Charters were created before the 1670s to ensure equality among members. Conscription was "executed" through the drafting of sailors from overturned vessels.

The book also explores other elements that made piracy successful. The Jolly Roger flag was not flown by coincidence, but instead was used as an element of branding. It was a substantial element to the success of their "business" – pirates capitalised on this operation. The flag among other elements were used to build pirate reputation. Their notoriety for barbarity created a fearsome "brand name" which would ensure their success was maximised. Torture also deterred authoritative figures from interfering.

The book ends with the use of management methods and the contemporary lessons which can be learnt from 17th and 18th century pirates. These "pioneers of democracy" had more to offer than just insanity and bloodshed.

Throughout the book, Leeson claims that pirate actions had economic reasoning, both for mutual benefit as well as the success of their society. Pirates’ actions were also just "common sense" and had an incentive to create rules to make “society get along.”

== Themes ==
Democracy

In rebellion to the autocratic notions of the 17th and 18th century merchant ships and governments, pirates elected their leaders through democracy. All crew members would vote on important matters that affected their society's way of functioning.

This form of democratic living was not stumbled upon, instead it was adopted through the sailor's experiences aboard merchant ships. The merchant ships’ ownership structure drove the autocratic organisation, and many captains leading their crews abused this power severely.

Pirates had a very different ownership structure. Instead of absolute ruling, pirates created a system of democratic checks and balances which would hold a captain accountable for the crew. It would also reduce their control over certain aspects of life. Constraining the captains’ ability benefited the crew's expense as it ensured cooperation between members, and more importantly, concreted piratical system and success.

Constitution

The implementation of democracy also called for the use of a constitution. Pirates created "articles of agreement" or codes which would aid the governing of the ship. The constitutions did many things, but in particular they prevented "negative externalities" that could occur by ensuring the cooperation of members, and created a "rule of law" which placed captains, quartermasters and other crew on an equal "legal" level.

Negative externalities is an economic term used to describe the harmful side effects that may result from one's behaviour. By placing everyone on an equal level, crew members were encouraged to maintain a successful and hard-working ship which would ensure mutual gain.

This constitutional democracy seen in 17th and 18th century pirates predated democracy in many countries, including the United States, France, Spain, and "arguably even England".

Signaling

The Jolly Roger flag used to signal other vessels of the terror that was approaching

An economic phenomenon known as "signaling" is evident in pirate way of life. They use this as a method of capitalisation through a flag known as the "Jolly Roger". The flag used a skull-and-bones motif which symbolised their way of life. It was so well-known that others who came across the flag knew what it symbolised, which heightened the success of the flag. It devised a way of letting others know they were victim, and encouraged them to surrender without fighting.

Pirates also believed that the success of their flags "benefited" their victims as it prevented unnecessary bloodshed and loss of life by encouraging them to surrender.

Signaling was seen in other flags besides the Jolly Roger. Many ships used specific flags to identify different crews and what to expect from them. Such reputations maximised their success.

Branding

This idea of economic reputation was furthered through the use of "brand names". Pirates were notorious for torturous methods. Victims were often reluctant to reveal treasure, sometimes it was hidden or destroyed. To prevent this, pirates created reputations and "brands" of barbarity. Victims grew too scared to be uncooperative, and were forced to reveal their booty.

Torture was also used to deter authorities from interfering with their affairs. It was also used as a method of justice in revenge to the merchant ships who abused them.

Conscription

Pirates would fill their ranks by drafting sailors. These sailors were unwilling members of merchant vessels the pirates overtook, or they were men eager to get away from their own tyrannical situations.

Changes to 18th century law made pirating riskier, and in response pirates would pretend to conscript their crews members in an apparent loop hole. They developed their solution to the new laws like businessmen – when rising problems threatened them they used them to their advantage.

Tolerance

In the 17th and 18th century, British authoritative figures including merchants would enslave black people. To counteract this, and to encourage those enslaved to join their crew, pirates integrated bondsmen into their ships as completely free members. However, this was inconsistent among certain pirate societies – some granted equal rights, but some still participated in the slave trade, and some did both.

This progressive notion however, indicated that pirates applied ideas of equality even before those same ideas in the Declaration of Independence were written.

Leeson does note that pirate tolerance was not produced by the ideas of equality and fairness, but instead was produced by the cost-benefit and compensation promises made by their leaders – this includes the charters developed, which included a worker's compensation. It outlined that a lost limb would entitle one to payment from the treasure, on top of their already promised payment equal to every other crew member.

== Critical reception ==
The Invisible Hook was a winner of the 2009 Best International Nonfiction Book and a winner of the 2009 Gold Medal Book of the Year Award in Business and Economics. Leeson's book was also a winner of San Francisco Chronicle's 100 Best Books for 2009 and has been praised by several academics. Claude Berube from the Washington Times says that Lesson has produced a "fresh" perspective on an old topic. Berube also describes how Leeson quells "the pirate myths" through economic theory. The New Yorker's Caleb Crain details the book as "brisk" and "clever". Edward Glaeser from the Economix blog identifies that Leeson's book uses the tools of economics to "make sense" of piracy.

Virgil Henry Storr's review of The Invisible Hook calls Leeson's "fantastic" book a demonstration that even a community of criminals can operate with a government. However, Storr also claims that the book raises the question as to why a government is "a prerequisite for peace". Storr compares Leeson's pirate organisations to Hayek's definition of society and describes that "pirate societies" are created to "provide service and earn profit" (Storr, 2010, pp. 294). Storr also compliments Leeson on his convincing work of explaining why pirate governance was not government, however argues that he did not explain why pirate governance worked.

Per L. Bylund's review of The Invisible Hook describes that Leeson claims piratical enterprise "resembled a Fortune 500 company" and was conducted much like a for-profit business firm. Bylund argues that there is not much evidence to support this view, and the extent of resemblance between a pirate ship and a modern-day corporation is not clear. Bylund declares that the book is more a descriptive historical "case study" using economics to explain certain functions of pirate crews, rather than an "in-depth economic analysis of pirate organisation" (Bylund, 2011, pp. ).

Alan Kirman's review describes Leeson's book as "delightful" and "informative", although the message of the book is "too facile". Kirman also identifies one of the "oldest problems" in economics that Leeson faces: arguing that pirates made their arrangements consciously with their collective interest in mind is essentially different from the idea of Adam Smith’s “Invisible Hand", which is the idea that individual self interest, multiplied endlessly, results in an unconsciously created but successful economy.

Marcus Rediker’s book Between the Devil and the Deep Blue Sea explored maritime life of pirates and alike but under a more Marxist-oriented analysis. Rediker implemented court records and “accounts by seamen” (Lydon, 1988, pp. 136) as sources for data in his book. They actively demonstrate the life, labour and conflicts of sea life. Rediker also argues against Leeson’s point that pirates created rules to make harmony in society. He states that rather than it being about human nature, it is just the “specific experience” of sailors and how they want to “imagine a better world”.
