= Gary L. Wolfram =

American economist

Academic background
- Education: University of California, Santa Barbara (BA); University of California at Berkeley (PhD)
- Thesis: A theory of local government expenditure. (1976)

Gary Lee Wolfram is an American economist. He is the William E. Simon Professor in Economics and Public Policy at Hillsdale College and President of Hillsdale Policy Group, a consulting firm specializing in taxation and policy analysis.

== Early life and education ==
As a youth, Wolfram spent summers fighting California wildfires along the freeways. Wolfram received his Bachelor of Arts degree from the University of California, Santa Barbara and his Ph.D. in economics from the University of California at Berkeley.

== Career ==
Wolfram's public policy experience includes serving as Congressman Nick Smith's Chief of Staff, Michigan's Deputy State Treasurer for Taxation and Economic Policy under John Engler, and Senior Economist to the Republican Senate in Michigan. In 2007, after publicly supporting Mitt Romney's run for presidency, the campaign publicly supported Wolfram, stating "Wolfram has an excellent reputation as an economist...I'm proud to have his endorsement and his counsel as our campaign moves forward."

He has taught at Mount Holyoke College, the University of Michigan, and Washington State University. His publications include Towards a Free Society: An Introduction to Markets and the Political System and several works on Michigan's tax structure and other public policy issues. Wolfram is also a Senior Policy Analyst with the Mackinac Center for Public Policy. He is a current member and past chairman of the Board of Trustees of Lake Superior State University and has served as a member of Michigan's State Board of Education, the Michigan Enterprise Zone Authority, the Michigan Strategic Fund Board, and the Michigan State Housing Development Authority Board.
