= VoteSpotter =

Mobile app to track American politics

- VoteSpotter's logo

- Screenshot Screenshot of the vote information screen in VoteSpotter
- Developer: Mackinac Center for Public Policy
- Operating system: Android OS, iOS
- Type: Vote tracking app
- License: Proprietary freeware
- Website: votespotter.com

VoteSpotter was a mobile app developed by Michigan-based free market think tank Mackinac Center for Public Policy to track votes by elected officials in the United States.

== Development ==
VoteSpotter was developed by the Mackinac Center for Public Policy, a free market-oriented think tank based in Michigan. It was originally an extension of the organization's MichiganVotes.org website, but has since expanded to include other states.

== Usage ==
The mobile app allows users to track votes by United States federal elected officials and state officials in select states. The app's state officials information originally focused on Michigan, but has since expanded to include additional states. Vote results can be found by entering an address and identifying which elected officials represent that address. Users can also indicate if they support a particular vote or not, and compare their answer with other app users.
