= Opinion corridor =

Theory of legitimate public discourse

Opinion corridor (Swedish: åsiktskorridor, Norwegian: meningskorridor) refers to a sociopolitical phenomenon that has been observed during the beginning of the 21st century in Sweden, and to some extent also in Norway. The expression itself was originally used in 2013 by Henrik Oscarsson, professor of political science at the University of Gothenburg, as a metaphor for the limits of what is commonly acceptable to debate.

The concept is similar to the Overton window, which assumes a sliding scale of legitimate political conversation, and to Hallin's spheres, which assumes that the press implicitly groups issues into questions of wide consensus, legitimate controversy, and deviance. The Swedish Language Council has included the word åsiktskorridor in its 2014 list of neologisms.

== Overview ==
=== Background ===
In December 2013, political scientist Henrik Oscarsson described how he perceived that the space for freedom of opinion had been tightened in Swedish debates. He provided some examples of opinions that were rarely expressed despite being common throughout the population:

- 14% of Swedes agree with limiting the rights to abortion.
- 40% think that Sweden should accept fewer refugees.
- 60% want more animal rights.
- 50% of Swedes do not agree with allowing homosexual couples to adopt children.
- 20% think that there should be a death penalty for murder.
- 25% of all Swedes want to increase the number of wolves.
- Almost 10% want to reduce the expenditure for wind power.
- 5% agree with abolishing the graduation ceremonies in churches.

Oscarsson concluded with calling for "a more moderate and respectful attitude from policymakers".

In February 2015, Expressen editor Ann-Charlotte Marteus published an apology for being part of "constructing a corridor that prevented a constructive debate about migration and integration". She wrote that it was something that she started doing around 2002, when language tests were being debated and the Sweden Democrats started to become more influential. She was also afraid that Sweden's political climate would become more similar to that of Denmark.

Sweden didn't become like Denmark, thank goodness. Maybe the opinion corridor helped. But the price was too high: widespread self-censorship, a fear to examine reality objectively, a diminished belief in the power of arguments. And as a result a dumbed-down public, moral-panicked politicians and social problems that should have gotten attention and been dealt with a long time ago. It proved to be an expensive corridor.

— Ann-Charlotte Marteus, Expressen, 24 May 2015

=== Other observations ===
Erik Helmersson from Dagens Nyheter wrote that Sweden has many opinion corridors in which people rarely question the norms within the group. He blames the Swedish "culture of consensus" and says the social cost for presenting an opposing view is too high. He also praises director Stina Oscarson for her new expression "test speech" and states that it's important to allow people to try new ways of thinking without being smothered by blame and insults.

Alice Teodorescu has stated that she wants to "tear down the opinion corridor" and has made comparisons with totalitarian systems.

We live in a time where it's considered brave to think freely, despite the fact that it's not forbidden.

— Alice Teodorescu, Göteborgs-Posten, 6 March 2015

== Statistical research ==
During the first quarter of 2015, the statistical institute Demoskop conducted a survey named "Who dares to speak about their opinions?" which had a sample size of 4,348. They observed the following trends:

- Increased hesitation in debates with people outside the usual social circles
- People with left-wing ideologies speak more openly while those that identify themselves as nationally oriented or conservative feel that they have more limitations
- Majorities risk being portrayed as minorities
- Immigration is the topic in which most people feel limited

== Criticism and denial ==
Council politician Per Altenberg of the Liberals party, while not addressing the research by professor Oscarsson, denied the existence of the opinion corridor and maintained that the corridor should not be discussed in his opinion piece entitled "There is no opinion corridor".

Let's get rid of the opinion corridor and end this whole debate that there are things you can't say in Sweden.

— Per Altenberg, Svenska Dagbladet, 24 May 2015

Columnist Malin Ullgren from Dagens Nyheter, while not addressing the research by professor Oscarsson, condemns the usage of the term, and describes it as a rhetorical device the far right uses to undermine the stability of society. She states that right-wing extremists have spent years on "systematic erosion of the limits of decency" to further their agendas and that the far right freely express their agendas.

Contributing to delusions about opinion corridors or "cover-up of truth by the elite" is to actively undermine democracy.

— Malin Ullgren, Dagens Nyheter, 3 February 2016

== See also ==
- Chilling effect
- Conformity
- Cultural hegemony
- Echo chamber (media)
- Hallin's spheres
- Overton window
- Peer pressure
- Political correctness
- Self-censorship
- Spiral of silence
- Third rail of politics
