= Hallin's spheres =

Theory of media objectivity

Hallin's spheres: sphere of consensus, sphere of controversy and sphere of deviance

Hallin's spheres is a theory of news reporting and its rhetorical framing posited by journalism historian Daniel C. Hallin in his 1986 book The Uncensored War to explain the news coverage of the Vietnam War. Hallin divides the world of political discourse into three concentric spheres: consensus, legitimate controversy, and deviance. In the sphere of consensus, journalists assume everyone agrees. The sphere of legitimate controversy includes the standard political debates, and journalists are expected to remain neutral. The sphere of deviance falls outside the bounds of legitimate debate, and journalists can ignore it. These boundaries shift, as public opinion shifts. Hallin's spheres, which deal with the media, are similar to the Overton window, which deals with public opinion generally, and posits a sliding scale of public opinion on any given issue ranging from conventional wisdom to unacceptable.

Hallin used the concept of framing to describe the presentation and reception of issues in public. For example, framing the use of drugs as criminal activity can encourage the public to consider that behavior anti-social. Hallin's work was later referred to in the controversial formulation of the concept of an opinion corridor, in which the range of acceptable public opinion narrows, and opinion outside that corridor moves from legitimate controversy into deviance.

== Description ==
=== Sphere of consensus ===
This sphere contains those topics on which there is widespread agreement, or at least the perception thereof. Within the sphere of consensus, "journalists feel free to invoke a generalized 'we' and to take for granted shared values and shared assumptions". Examples include such things as motherhood and apple pie. For topics in this sphere, journalists feel free to be advocating cheerleaders without having to be neutral or present any opposing view point and be disinterested observers."

=== Sphere of legitimate controversy ===
For topics in this sphere rational and informed people hold differing views within limited range. These topics are therefore the most important to cover, and also ones upon which journalists are seemingly obliged to remain disinterested reporters, rather than advocating for or against a particular view. Schudson notes that Hallin, in his influential study of the US media during the Vietnam War, argues that journalism's commitment to objectivity has always been compartmentalized. That is, within a certain sphere—the sphere of legitimate controversy—journalists seek conscientiously to be balanced and objective. The work of Walter Williams professor at the University of Missouri, Rod Petersen, advanced the idea that priming—controlling the narratives that media covers—can be the tool that media use to get deviant news subjects into the legitimate controversial circles of new coverage.

=== Sphere of deviance ===
Topics in this sphere are rejected by journalists as being unworthy of general consideration. Such views are perceived as being out of hand, unfounded, taboo, or of such minor consequence that they are not newsworthy. Hallin argues that in the sphere of deviance, "journalists also depart from standard norms of objective reporting and feel authorized to treat as marginal, laughable, dangerous". They either avoid mentioning or ridicule the controversial subject as outside the bounds of acceptable controversy; and they censor the individuals and groups who are associated with it. A simple example: a person claiming that aliens are manipulating college basketball scores might have difficulty finding sports media coverage for such a claim. A more political example: the US media regulator FCC's "Fairness Doctrine" aimed at radio stations, advocated balance between right and left political news and opinions, yet specified that broadcasters did not have to reserve any space or time for Communist viewpoints.

== Uses of the terms ==
Craig Watkins (2001, pp. 92–94) makes use of the Hallin's spheres in a paper examining ABC, CBS, and NBC television network television news coverage of the Million Man March, a demonstration that took place in Washington, D.C., on October 16, 1995. Watkins analyzes the dominant framing practices—problem definition, rhetorical devices, use of sources, and images—employed by journalists to make sense of this particular expression of political protest. He argues that Hallin's three spheres are a way for media framing practices to develop specific reportorial contexts, and each sphere develops its own distinct style of news reporting resources by different rhetorical tropes and discourses.

Piers Robinson (2001, p. 536) uses the concept in relation to debates that have emerged over the extent to which the mass media serves elite interests or, alternatively, plays a powerful role in shaping political outcomes. His article reviews Hallin's spheres as an example of media-state relations, that highlights theoretical and empirical shortcomings in the 'manufacturing consent' thesis (Chomsky, McChesney). Robinson argues that a more nuanced and bi-directional understanding is needed of the direction of influence between media and the state that builds upon, rather than rejecting, existing theoretical accounts.

Hallin's theory assumed a relatively homogenized media environment, where most producers were trying to reach most consumers. A more fractured media landscape can challenge this assumption because different audiences may place topics in different spheres, a concept related to the filter bubble, which posits that many members of the public choose to limit their media consumption to the areas of consensus and deviance that they personally prefer.

== See also ==
- Ambit claim
- Argument to moderation
- Creeping normality
- Cultural hegemony
- Door-in-the-face technique
- Slippery slope
- Spiral of silence
- Third rail of politics
- Overton window
