= Mackinac Center for Public Policy =

American conservative non-profit think tank

- Established: 1987; 39 years ago
- Tax ID no.: 38-2701547
- Headquarters: 140 West Main Street, Midland, Michigan, U.S.
- Coordinates: 43.6137°N 84.2460°W
- President: Joseph G. Lehman
- Chairman: Rodney M. Lockwood Jr.
- Budget: Revenue: $11.4 million Expenses: $12.9 million (FYE December 2024)
- Staff: 71 (2023)
- Website: mackinac.org

The Mackinac Center for Public Policy (/ˈmækɪnɔː/) is a conservative think tank headquartered in Midland, Michigan. Through research and programs, the Mackinac Center supports lower taxes, reduced regulatory authority for state agencies, right-to-work laws, school choice, and property rights.

Joseph Overton (1960–2003), a senior vice president of the Mackinac Center, stated the political strategy that later became known as the Overton window. Overton said that politically unpopular, unacceptable policies must be changed into politically acceptable policies before they can be enacted into law.

The Mackinac Center is said to be the largest state-based conservative think tank. It was ranked among the top 5 percent of think tanks in the United States by the 2018 Global Go To Think Tank Index Report. The Center sponsors MichiganVotes.org, an online legislative voting record database which provides a non-partisan summary of every bill and vote in the Michigan legislature.

== History ==
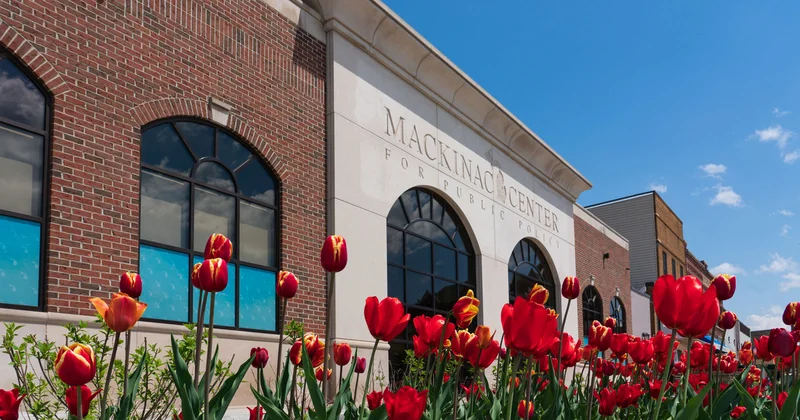
Mackinac Center building in Midland, Michigan

The organization was founded in 1987. In a 2011 interview, founder Joe Olson said that the Center was first conceived in a Lansing, Michigan bar at a meeting between Olson, fellow insurance company executive Tom Hoeg, Richard McLellan and then-Michigan Senate Republican majority leader John Engler, who would later become governor. Olson said the founders wanted an organization that would focus on research, writing, speaking, issuing press releases and looking at public policy from a free market point of view.

The Center began operations with no office or full-time staff. It formally opened offices in Midland in 1988 with its first president, Lawrence W. Reed, an economist, writer, and speaker who had chaired the economics department at Northwood University. The Lansing-based Cornerstone Foundation provided early direction and some funding. The Center's first annual budget under Reed was $80,000. In 1999, the Mackinac Center moved from rented offices to its current headquarters after having raised $2.4 million to renovate a former Woolworth's department store on Midland's Main Street.

The Mackinac Center is classified as a 501(c)(3) organization under the U.S. Internal Revenue Code. It is a member of the State Policy Network of state-level conservative and libertarian think tanks.

The Mackinac Center published a 20-point plan for state fiscal reform, with Governor John Engler fully or partially implementing 16 of those recommendations during his first term in office. In 1994, Engler said, "When the Mackinac Center speaks, we listen".

When asked by Detroit's Metro Times in 1996, the Center's President Lawrence Reed said: "Our funding sources are primarily foundations ... with the rest coming from corporations and individuals," but that "... revealing our contributors would be a tremendous diversion..."

In 2001, Mackinac Center was described as "the leading advocate for a universal education tax credit" by a Wall Street Journal editorial.

In November 2006 The New York Times published a two-part series about state-based "conservative" think tanks that described how the Mackinac Center trained think-tank executives from 42 countries and nearly every US state. The New York Times also reported that, "When the Mackinac Center was founded in 1987, there were just three other conservative state-level policy institutes. Now there are 48, in 42 states."

Reed served as president from the Center's founding until September 2008, when he assumed the title President Emeritus and also became the president of the Foundation for Economic Education. Former Chief Operating Officer Joseph G. Lehman was named the Mackinac Center's president on September 1, 2008.

In 2014, the organization released a mobile app, VoteSpotter. The app allows users to track votes by elected officials in the United States. It was originally an extension of the organization's MichiganVotes.org website but has since expanded to include other states.

The Mackinac Center in 2018 led several conservative groups urging teachers to leave unions with a national campaign called "My Pay, My Say".

In 2019, a satellite office was opened in Lansing, Michigan.

The Mackinac Center has criticized "sin taxes" like tobacco excise taxes, vaping regulations and a variety of alcohol rules. It received donations from Altria in the 2010s, according to a 2019 investigation by The Guardian about connections between the tobacco industry and free-market groups.

The Mackinac Center fought in court against the Biden administration's efforts to cancel some student loan payments and extend pandemic-related pauses on loans.

The Mackinac Center's director of energy and environmental policy was a contributor to the Project 2025 plan anticipating Donald Trump's second term as president of the United States. The Mackinac Center was removed from the Project 2025 credits after a request by the center. A Mackinac Center spokesperson said that it had "offered ideas on labor and energy policy" to the Heritage Foundation, which created Project 2025, but that "we do not endorse" some other ideas in the plan.

=== Coining of the term "Overton Window" ===
The concept of the "Overton window" was introduced in the 1990s by Joseph Overton, former senior vice president of the Mackinac Center. After his death in a plane crash in 2003, his colleague Joseph Lehman named the idea in a presentation about the power of consistent and persistent advocacy. The "Overton window" refers to the range of ideas which are considered culturally and politically fringe to mainstream, and when a subject matter moves along this spectrum it is considered to have changed its status along the "Overton window". The Mackinac Center defines the Overton Window as:

...a model for understanding how ideas in society change over time and influence politics. The core concept is that politicians are limited in what policy ideas they can support—they generally only pursue policies that are widely accepted throughout society as legitimate policy options. These policies lie inside the Overton Window. Other policy ideas exist, but politicians risk losing popular support if they champion these ideas. These policies lie outside the Overton Window.

== Legal advocacy ==
The Mackinac Center Legal Foundation is a non-profit, pro-bono organization associated with the Mackinac Center for Public Policy focusing on advancing liberty and free markets.

According to the Mackinac Center, its key areas of focus include: labor law, property law, constitutional law and laws pertaining to healthcare in America.

In 2020, the Mackinac Center Legal Foundation initiated a lawsuit against Governor Gretchen Whitmer, which ultimately led to the Michigan Supreme Court issuing a unanimous decision in favor of the Mackinac Center. The court declared that Governor Whitmer's attempts to extend a state of emergency beyond April 30, 2020, without legislative approval was illegal. Additionally, in a 4-3 decision, the Court ruled that the Emergency Powers of Governor Act of 1945, which Governor Whitmer had cited as the basis for maintaining unilateral control for an indefinite period, is unconstitutional. Consequently, all executive orders issued after April 30 are currently considered null and void.

=== Lawsuits involving Michigan Education Association (MEA) ===
==== Michigan Education Association v. Mackinac Center for Public Policy ====
In 2002 the Michigan Education Association (MEA) and its president, Luigi Battaglieri, sued the Mackinac Center for quoting Battaglieri in a fundraising letter highlighting its effectiveness. The MEA argued that commercial speech case law required the Mackinac Center to obtain permission for using the quotation. However, the Court concluded that the quotation in the fundraising letter "falls squarely within the protection of the First Amendment for discourse on matters of public interest."

==== Mackinac Center Legal Foundation v. Michigan Education Association ====
In January 2022, the Mackinac Center Legal Foundation filed a lawsuit against the Michigan Education Association (MEA) and its insurance affiliate, the Michigan Education Special Services Association (MESSA). The lawsuit was filed under the federal False Claims Act, maintaining that these labor unions improperly sought and received $12.5 million in COVID-19 relief money through the Paycheck Protection Program (PPP).

The Paycheck Protection Program, which was intended to provide relief to small businesses, was not designed for 501(c)(5) nonprofits like the MEA or 501(c)(9) nonprofits like MESSA. Despite this, both organizations applied for and received funding through the PPP in April 2020, with the MEA receiving $6.4 million and MESSA receiving $6.1 million. In December 2020, the MEA and MESSA reportedly returned the funds.

The Mackinac Center Legal Foundation filed the lawsuit on the grounds that the actions of the MEA and MESSA deprived other businesses of relief funds during the COVID-19 pandemic. Fourteen months after the lawsuit was filed, the case was settled in favor of the Mackinac Center. As part of the settlement, the MEA and MESSA agreed to pay $200,000 in reimbursements and fines. Additionally, the two union organizations agreed to pay the Mackinac Center $77,000 in attorneys fees, and the federal government paid the Mackinac Center $23,000 for discovering the improper loans.

== Positions ==
The Center writes that its ideology is most accurately characterized as flowing from the "classical liberal tradition" of Milton Friedman and others: "socially tolerant, economically sophisticated, desiring little government intervention in either their personal or economic affairs." In a 2011 interview about the organization, one of its founders, Olson, said "Some will say the Mackinac Center is a Republican front" but that he disagreed.

The Mackinac Center was involved in the effort to pass a right-to-work law in Michigan and has supported efforts in other states to expand right to work laws and workers' rights to not pay dues to a union they do not support. The Center also launched the website MyPayMySay.com to alert union members to their rights.

== Funding ==
In 2022, the foundation's total revenue was $11.5 million, and its expenditures were $11.5 million, according to ProPublica.

Between 2008 and 2013, the Mackinac Center received $2.4 million from DonorsTrust, a donor-advised fund used by conservatives. Conservative foundations and individuals use Donors Trust to pass money along to support their ideology. Donor-advised funds allow individuals, foundations and charities to give money anonymously. DonorsTrust is used by the Koch family and other donors. The funding was for statehouse reporting and attendance at meetings of the American Legislative Exchange Council (ALEC).

== Publications and projects ==
In addition to policy studies, the Center publishes a number of periodicals including Michigan Education Report, Michigan Privatization Report, Michigan Science, Michigan Capitol Confidential, Impact, Michigan Education Digest and Michigan Context and Performance Report Card.

=== Michigan Capitol Confidential ===
Michigan Capitol Confidential is a nonprofit news service published by the Mackinac Center. It provides news and analysis of Michigan-specific issues, including state and local government policies, education, and economics.

=== MichiganVotes ===
MichiganVotes is a project whose primary objective is to facilitate access to information regarding historical and ongoing legislative actions. Its users have the capability to search for bills by their respective numbers, categories, or keywords. This platform is designed by Mackinac Center with the aim to enable individuals to stay informed about various legislations and to ensure that their elected officials are held responsible for their actions.

== Personnel ==
=== Policy staff members ===
- Burton W. Folsom Jr., Senior Fellow in Economic Education
- Lawrence Reed, President Emeritus

=== Adjunct scholars ===
- Peter Boettke
- Richard Ebeling
- James Gattuso
- Paul McCracken (1915–2013)
- Robert Murphy
- Mark J. Perry
- Robert Sirico
- Bradley A. Smith
- John B. Taylor
- Richard Vedder
- Gary L. Wolfram

=== Board of directors ===
Current members of the Mackinac Center's board of directors include:

- Rodney M. Lockwood Jr., Chairman of the Board; Chairman/CEO of the Lockwood Companies
- Joseph G. Lehman, President; Vice chairman of the National Taxpayers Union and a director of the Fairness Center
- Richard D. McLellan, Secretary; McLellan Law Offices; formerly Dykema Gossett Law Firm
- Clifford W. Taylor, Member; Chief Justice of the Michigan Supreme Court from 2005 through 2009
- Richard Haworth, Member; Chairman of Haworth, an office furniture and architectural interior company based in Holland, Michigan
- Jim Barrett, Member; President & CEO of the Michigan Chamber of Commerce
- Daniel Graf, Member; Financial analyst at Amerisure Mutual Holdings
- J.C. Huizenga, Member; Chairman of and founder of Huizenga Group, Member of the Acton Institute board of trustees
- Edward C. Levy Jr., Member; President of Edw. C. Levy Co.
- Joseph P. Maguire, Treasurer; President of Wolverine Development Corporation
- Jennifer Panning, Member; President and founder of Artisan Tile Inc.

Former members of the organization's board include:

- Robert Teeter, Republican pollster and political campaign strategist
- Paul V. Gadola, United States District Judge
- Lawrence Reed, President Emeritus of the Mackinac Center and president of the Foundation for Economic Education
- Dulce Fuller, Member; Chairman of the Southeast Michigan Committee of The Heritage Foundation
- D. Joseph Olson, Member; retired from Amerisure
- Kent Herrick, Vice Chairman; President of Thermogy
