= Overton window =

Range of ideas tolerated in public discourse

An illustration of the Overton window, along with Treviño's degrees of acceptance

The Overton window is the range of subjects and arguments politically acceptable to the mainstream population at a given time. It is also known as the window of discourse. The key to the concept is that the window changes over time; it can shift, shrink, or expand. It exemplifies "the slow evolution of societal values and norms".

The term is named after the American policy analyst and former senior vice president at Mackinac Center for Public Policy, Joseph Overton, who proposed that the political viability of an idea depends mainly on whether it falls within an acceptability range, rather than on the individual preferences of politicians using the term or concept. According to Overton, the window frames the range of policies that a politician may recommend without appearing too extreme, in order to gain or keep public office given the climate of public opinion at that particular time.

== Summary ==
In the early 1990s, Overton described a spectrum from "more free" to "less free" with regard to governmental intervention, which he presented graphically on a vertical axis to avoid comparison with the left-right political spectrum. As the spectrum moves or expands, an idea at a given location on the scale may become more or less politically acceptable. Overton claimed that politicians typically act freely only within the "window" of those seen as acceptable. After his death, his Mackinac Center for Public Policy colleague, Joseph Lehman, further developed the idea and named it after him.

According to Lehman:

The most common misconception is that lawmakers themselves are in the business of shifting the Overton window. That is absolutely false. Lawmakers are actually in the business of detecting where the window is, and then moving to be in accordance with it.

He presented the concept as simply a description of how ideas operate in public discourse, and not about advocacy of extreme policy proposals. In an interview with The New York Times, he said:

It just explains how ideas come in and out of fashion, the same way that gravity explains why something falls to the earth. I can use gravity to drop an anvil on your head, but that would be wrong. I could also use gravity to throw you a life preserver; that would be good.

The political commentator Joshua Treviño has postulated six degrees of acceptance of public ideas: "roughly"

- unthinkable
- radical
- acceptable
- sensible
- popular
- policy

On this basis, the Overton window comprises the politically possible ideas: those in the lower part of the list, from acceptable downward. Proponents of policies outside the window may then seek to expand the window, by highlighting their own proposals or others similar to them (or more extreme), or to shift the window by devaluing opposed ideas. Proponents of current policies, or similar ones within the window, might attempt to narrow the window by convincing people that policies outside the status quo should be deemed unacceptable.

Treviño emphasised that while this analysis originated on the political Right, and is mainly in use there, it is equally available to think tanks on the Left.

The concept of a shifting range of acceptability has been applied in areas unrelated to political policy, as far afield as neonatology.

== See also ==
- Anchoring effect – Tendency to base judgments on an irrelevant anchor
- Argument to moderation – Informal fallacy that the truth is always a compromise
- Comfort zone – Psychological state
- Creeping normality – Process by which a change can be accepted through happening slowly
- Door-in-the-face technique – Starting with an unreasonable offer to make the next one more appealing
- Hallin's spheres – Theory of media objectivity
- Horseshoe theory – Posited similarity of the far-left and far-right in politics
- Moral relativism – Philosophical positions
- Normalization – Social processes through which ideas and actions come to be seen as normal
- Opinion corridor – Theory of legitimate public discourse
- Paradox of tolerance – Logical paradox in decision-making theory
- Political spectrum – Visual analogy for political or ideological positions
- Ratchet effect – Restrained ability of human process reversal
- Sanewashing – Downplaying the radical aspects of a person or idea
- Single-issue politics – Political campaigning or support based on one policy goal
- Value pluralism – Idea in ethics; many principles are true at the same time
