= Joseph Overton =

American political theorist (1960–2003)

- Born: Joseph Paul Overton; January 4, 1960; South Haven, Michigan, U.S.
- Died: June 30, 2003 (aged 43); Tuscola County, Michigan, U.S.
- Education: Michigan Technological University (BS, MA); Western Michigan University Cooley Law School (JD)
- Occupation: Political activist
- Employers: Mackinac Center for Public Policy (1992–2003); Dow Chemical Company (prior years)
- Known for: Overton window; research on education and public policy

Joseph Paul Overton (January 4, 1960 – June 30, 2003) was an American think-tank executive who served as the senior vice president of the Mackinac Center for Public Policy. He is best known for his work in the mid-1990s developing an idea since known as the Overton window.

== Biography ==
Overton was born in Southwestern Michigan. In 1965, his family moved to Midland, Michigan, for a job with the Dow Chemical Company. He graduated from Herbert Henry Dow High School in 1978.

He held a bachelor of science degree in electrical engineering from Michigan Technological University and a Juris Doctor degree from the Thomas M. Cooley Law School at Western Michigan University.

A visual representation of the Overton window

Overton was admitted to the State Bar of Michigan in 1994. He was appointed to the Michigan Appellate Defender Commission by Governor John Engler. His appointment was recommended by the Michigan Supreme Court. Before joining the Mackinac Center, he worked as a quality specialist, project manager and electrical engineer at the Dow Chemical Company in Midland, Michigan.

Overton was an ardent libertarian. While associated with the Mackinac Center in Midland, he promoted and studied free-market principles for over ten years while travelling to more than a dozen countries in Europe, Asia, Africa and South America. One of his other responsibilities was fund-raising.

In order to explain what think tanks do, in the 1990s he designed a brochure to illustrate the range of policies politically acceptable to the mainstream at a given time. That idea eventually became known as the Overton window, and his lasting legacy. He opined that it is the responsibility of think-tanks to propose policies outside the window and shift the window.

In 1998, Overton was honored with the Roe Award from the State Policy Network (SPN) at their meeting in Atlanta, Georgia. The award, presented annually, honors individuals who have successfully promoted free market philosophy while displaying innovation, accomplishment and innovation in public policy.

He died at age 43 from injuries suffered in a crash while piloting an ultralight aircraft, soon after taking off from Tuscola Area Airport near Caro, Michigan. Overton had married on March 29, 2003, only a few months before the accident.

Shortly after his death, he was honored by the State Policy Network with the creation of the Overton Award, a special distinction. It is bestowed infrequently and limited to COOs or Executive VPs of non-profit, free market organizations who demonstrate the personal qualities that Overton possessed. These include humility in supporting their peers, leadership that builds a great team, and developing effective strategies that magnify the ideas and influence of their organization. The Overton Award has been awarded only six times since its inception in 2003.

== See also ==
- Overton Award
