= Mark J. Perry =

American economist

- Born: Mark Joseph Perry; 1952 (age 73–74)

Academic background
- Education: George Mason University
- Thesis: Macroeconomic applications of ARCH models (1993)

Mark Joseph Perry (born 1952) is an American economist, a former professor of economics and finance in the School of Management at University of Michigan–Flint, and scholar at The American Enterprise Institute. He is also a member of the Board of Scholars for the Mackinac Center for Public Policy.

== Education ==
Perry holds two graduate degrees in economics (M.A. and Ph.D.) from George Mason University and in addition has an MBA degree in finance from The University of Minnesota.

== Activism ==
Perry has been active in campaigning against male sex discrimination under Title IX on US campuses since 2016. He contends that under Title IX, universities are legally obligated to offer equal opportunities to both men and women. He claims to have filed over 100 complaints at universities across the US against affirmative action programs and female-only scholarships for "illegal sex discrimination", referring to himself as "one-man mission" to fix the programs.

In June 2016, Perry filed a complaint with the Michigan Department of Civil Rights seeking the closure of Michigan State University's Women's Lounge, alleging that having a private place for women to study on campus discriminated against men, and was a violation of civil rights. He claimed the female only facility was a violation of both the Michigan Civil Rights Initiative and the equal opportunity in education act Title IX. In July 2016, Michigan State University made the lounge a gender-neutral space to ensure compliance with Title IX.

In 2018, he was the recipient of the National Coalition for Men's Award for Excellence in the Advancement of Men's Issues for his activism.

In 2020, he filed a complaint with the Department of Education's Cleveland Office for Civil Rights, which led to Ohio State University restructuring eight programmes.

== Economic analysis ==
He has written about gender issues, including differences in wage rates between men and women, for publications such as The Washington Post and The Wall Street Journal. He has been critical of how the difference in pay has been measured and the conclusions drawn. For example, he argues differences in hours worked, education and having children should be accounted for.

He has written that increasing the minimum wage may lead to job losses, criticizing a report by John Komlos who argued few jobs would be lost. Economist Jacob Vigdor claimed that Perry's analysis was carried out using faulty data. In response, Perry said: "The jury is still out on the $15 minimum wage, ... and it will take years to assess its impact. I'm simply pointing to some possible evidence in employment trends that might suggest that there is early evidence of some effects."

He criticised Obama's policies of demand market stimulation like the proposal of subsidizing electric and hybrid cars' sector, both for producers and consumers. Perry qualified public economic subsidies as a "boondoggle" and a severe market distortion, which would have been hindered the development of other alternative technologies such as hybrids and gasoline advanced engines.

He provides a chart (updated every 6 months) on his blog showing the difference in price changes since 2000 in selected items tracked by the Bureau of Labor Statistics. The chart has been cited by numerous sources as highlighting the difference between traded goods (e.g. televisions) and non-traded services (e.g. medical).

== Selected publications ==
- Grier, Kevin B.; Perry, Mark J. (1 August 1998). "On inflation and inflation uncertainty in the G7 countries". Journal of International Money and Finance. 17 (4): 671–689. doi:10.1016/S0261-5606(98)00023-0.
- Grier, Kevin B.; Perry, Mark J. (January–February 2000). "The effects of real and nominal uncertainty on inflation and output growth: some GARCH-M evidence". Journal of Applied Econometrics. 15 (1): 45–58. doi:10.1002/(SICI)1099-1255(200001/02)15:1<45::AID-JAE542>3.0.CO;2-K. JSTOR 2678579.
- Mehdian, Seyed; Perry, Mark J. (September–October 2001). "The reversal of the Monday Effect: new evidence from US equity markets". Journal of Business Finance and Accounting. 28 (7–8): 1043–1065. doi:10.1111/1468-5957.00404.
