= Dykema Gossett =

American law firm

Dykema Gossett PLLC
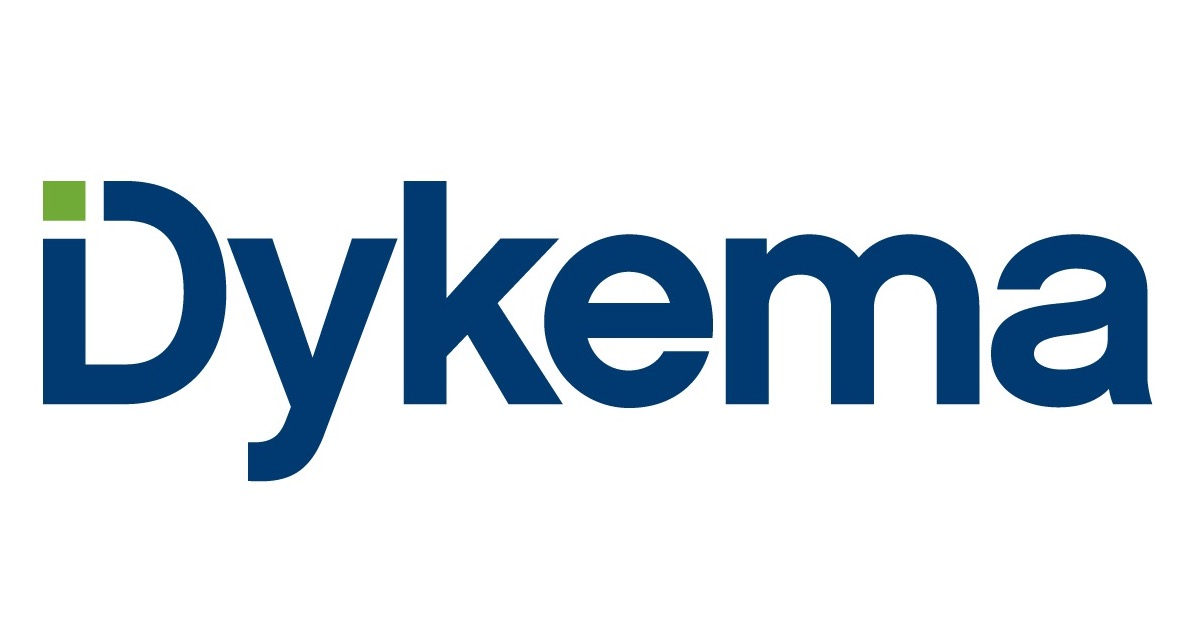
- Headquarters: Detroit, MI
- No. of offices: 14
- No. of attorneys: 353 (2021)
- Major practice areas: General practice
- Key people: Leonard Wolfe, Chairman and CEO
- Revenue: $218,813,000 (2021)
- Date founded: 1926
- Company type: Professional Limited Liability Company
- Website: dykema.com

Dykema Gossett PLLC, doing business as Dykema, is an American full-service law firm. Founded and headquartered in Detroit, it has offices in various locations around the United States including California, Illinois, Michigan, Minnesota, Texas, Washington, D.C., and Wisconsin. Dykema's largest office is in Chicago but its combined Southeast Michigan offices (Detroit, Bloomfield Hills, and Ann Arbor) are collectively larger. As of 2020, it was the 118th largest law firm in the nation.

Among other areas, Dykema is recognized for having a strong automotive practice in the United States. The firm represents Chrysler, Ford, General Motors, Honda, Kia, Mitsubishi, Nissan, Toyota, and Volvo.

Also substantial is Dykema’s banking and consumer financial services practice. A significant portion of the firm's reported litigation cases over the last two years have involved banking issues. According to the firm, it "provides counseling and litigation representation to financial institutions, including banks, savings and loan associations, finance companies, credit card issuers, mortgage bankers, vendors and retailers."

In 2007 and 2008, the firm helped draft and secure the passage of the ballot initiative that created the Michigan Medical Marihuana Act.

== History ==
- 1926 Founded in Detroit, Michigan by Raymond K. Dykema, Elroy O. Jones and Renville Wheat.
- 1970 Opened its second office in Bloomfield Hills to manage its expanding client list.
- 1978 Opened its Washington, DC office.
- 1995 Opened its Chicago office.
- 2003 Started its Los Angeles office by acquiring law firm Feeney Kellett Wienner & Bush.
- 2004 Dykema merges with Rooks Pitts, a Chicago firm founded in 1897, to significantly enhance its Midwest presence.
- 2007 Launched its first Texas office in Dallas.
- 2008 Merged with Schwartz Cooper, boosting its Chicago presence.
- 2013 Opened a new office in Minneapolis, its first in Minnesota.
- 2013 Opened an office in Austin, its second in Texas.
- 2015 Expanded its presence in Texas and the Southwest by combining with venerable Texas firm Cox Smith, adding offices in San Antonio and McAllen.
- 2019 Dykema combines with Loss, Judge & Ward, doubling its Washington, DC presence.
- 2022 Opened its first Wisconsin office in Milwaukee.
- 2022 Opened an office in Houston, Texas.

== Honors ==
The Legal 500 U.S. 2022 guide ranks Dykema in the top 10 for its Automotive Product Liability Litigation, Automotive Litigation, Gaming and Native American Law, and Cannabis Law practices. Additionally, the firm's Appellate and Critical Motions practice was included in the "Firms to Watch" list.

Also, over half (214) of Dykema attorneys were named a 2014 Super Lawyer or Rising Star by Thomson Reuters' "Super Lawyers", the annual ranking that recognizes attorneys who have attained a high-degree of peer recognition and professional achievement. Dykema was, in 2012, named the top corporate law firm in Detroit by Corporate Board Member Magazine for the second year. The 2012 study is the publication’s 12th annual Legal Industry Research Study, a comprehensive ranking by U.S. corporate directors and general counsel at the nation’s top corporate law firms.

== Offices ==
- (United States) Ann Arbor
- (United States) Austin
- (United States) Bloomfield Hills
- (United States) Chicago
- (United States) Dallas
- (United States) Detroit
- (United States) Grand Rapids
- (United States) Houston
- (United States) Lansing
- (United States) Los Angeles
- (United States) McAllen
- (United States) Minneapolis
- (United States) San Antonio
- (United States) Washington, D.C.
