= Petrochemical Heritage Award =

Industry award

- Awarded for: "to recognize individuals who made outstanding contributions to the petrochemical community"
- Date: 1997
- Presented by: Founders Club, Science History Institute

The Petrochemical Heritage Award was established in 1997, "to recognize individuals who made outstanding contributions to the petrochemical community." The award is intended to inspire achievement and to promote public understanding. The award winner is chosen annually by the Founders Club and the Science History Institute (formerly the Chemical Heritage Foundation). The award is traditionally presented at the International Petrochemical Conference hosted by the American Fuel and Petrochemical Manufacturers (AFPM), formerly known as NPRA, the National Petrochemical & Refiners Association.

== Recipients ==
The following people have received the Petrochemical Heritage Award:

- 2020, Jim Teague, CEO of Enterprise Products
- 2019, James Y. Chao and Albert Chao, founders of the Westlake Chemical Corporation
- 2018, Gary K. Adams, former president, CEO, and chair of the board of Chemical Market Associates
- 2017, David N. Weidman, retired chair and CEO of Celanese Corporation
- 2016, Stephen D. Pryor, retired president of ExxonMobil Chemical Company
- 2015, James L. Gallogly, former chief executive officer of LyondellBasell
- 2014, Frank Popoff, retired chairman and chief executive officer of the Dow Chemical Company
- 2013, Jim Ratcliffe, INEOS Founder and CEO
- 2012, Marvin O. Schlanger, chairman of the supervisory board of LyondellBasell Industries
- 2011, Raj Gupta, former chairman and CEO of Rohm and Haas
- 2010, Hiromasa Yonekura, chairman of the Sumitomo Chemical Company
- 2009, Mohamed Al-Mady, vice chairman and CEO of the Saudi Basic Industries Corporation (SABIC)
- 2008, Peter R. Huntsman, president and CEO of the Huntsman Corporation
- 2008, Dave C. Swalm, founder of Texas Petrochemicals Company/Texas Olefins
- 2007, Dan L. Duncan, chairman, Enterprise Products Partners
- 2006, J. Virgil Waggoner, former president and CEO of Sterling Chemicals
- 2005, Ting Tsung Chao, founder of the Westlake Chemical Corporation
- 2004, William A. McMinn, Jr., former president of Cain Chemical
- 2003, Harold Sorgenti, former president and chief executive officer of ARCO Chemical Company
- 2002, Herbert D. "Ted" Doan, former chairman and CEO of the Dow Chemical Company
- 2001, Jon M. Huntsman, founder of Huntsman Corporation
- 2000, Ralph Landau, cofounder of Scientific Design Group and Halcon.
- 1999, John R. Hall, chemical engineer and former president, chairman, and CEO of Ashland
- 1998, John T. Files, founder and chairman of the Merichem Company
- 1997, Gordon Cain, chemical engineer and entrepreneur

== Photo gallery ==
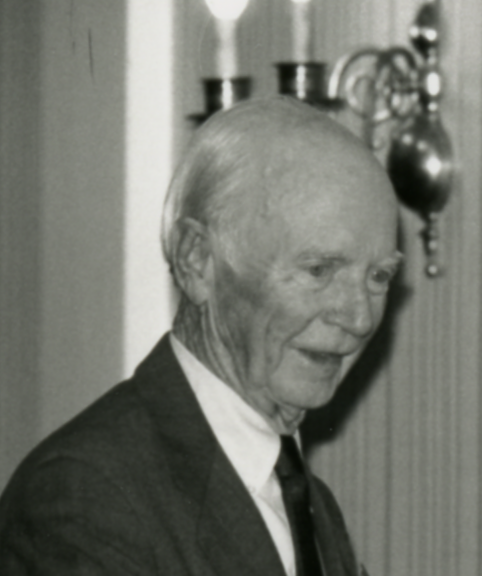
Gordon Cain (1997)

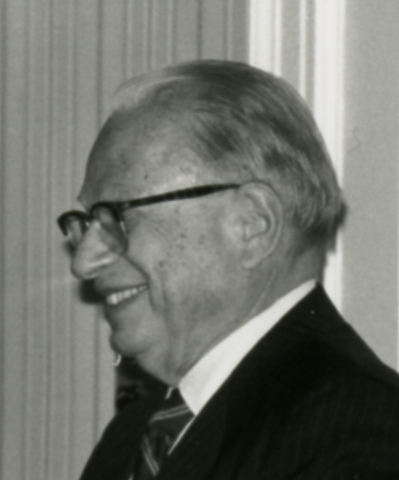
Ralph Landau (2000; photo from 1997)

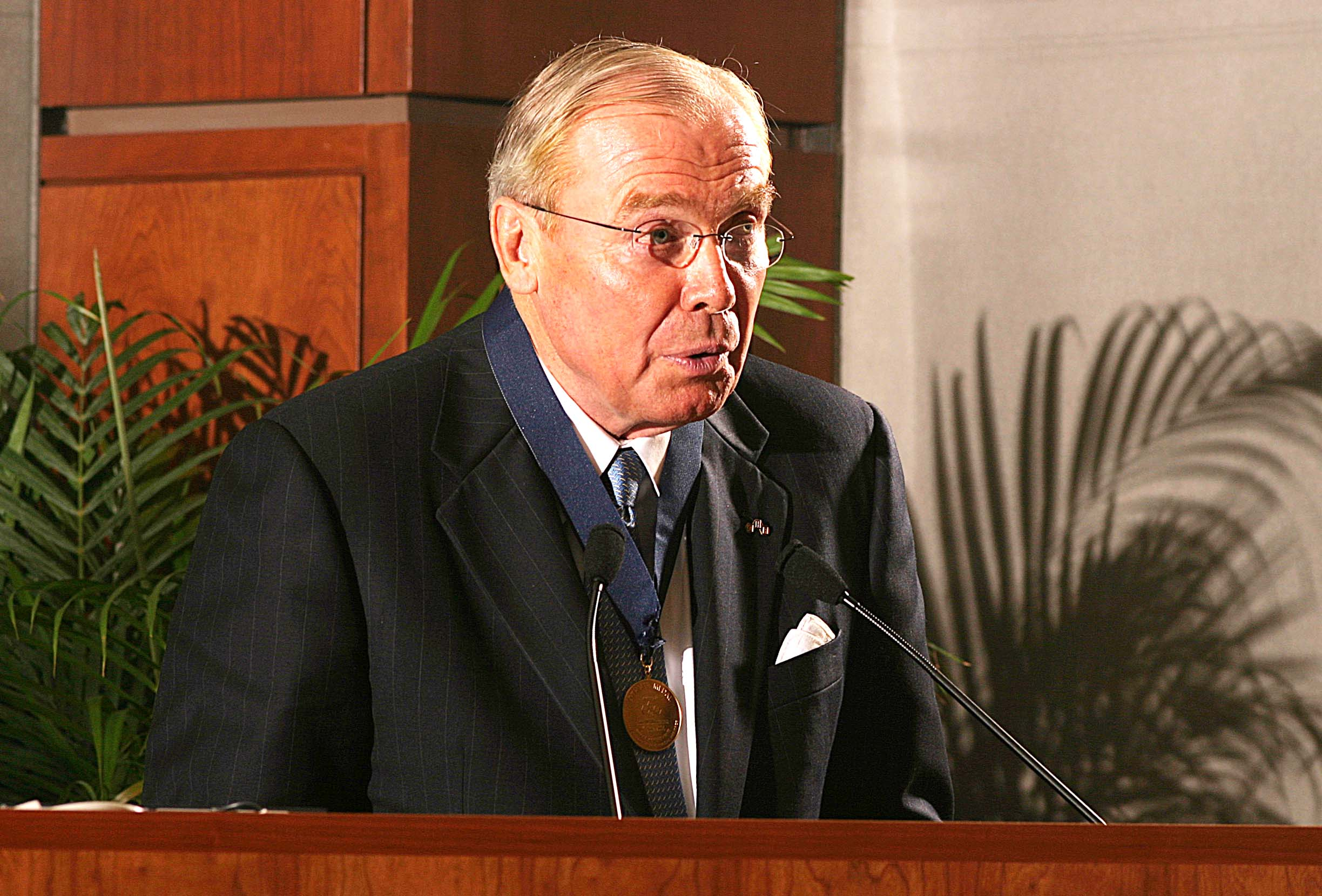
John M. Huntsman (2001, photo from 2004)

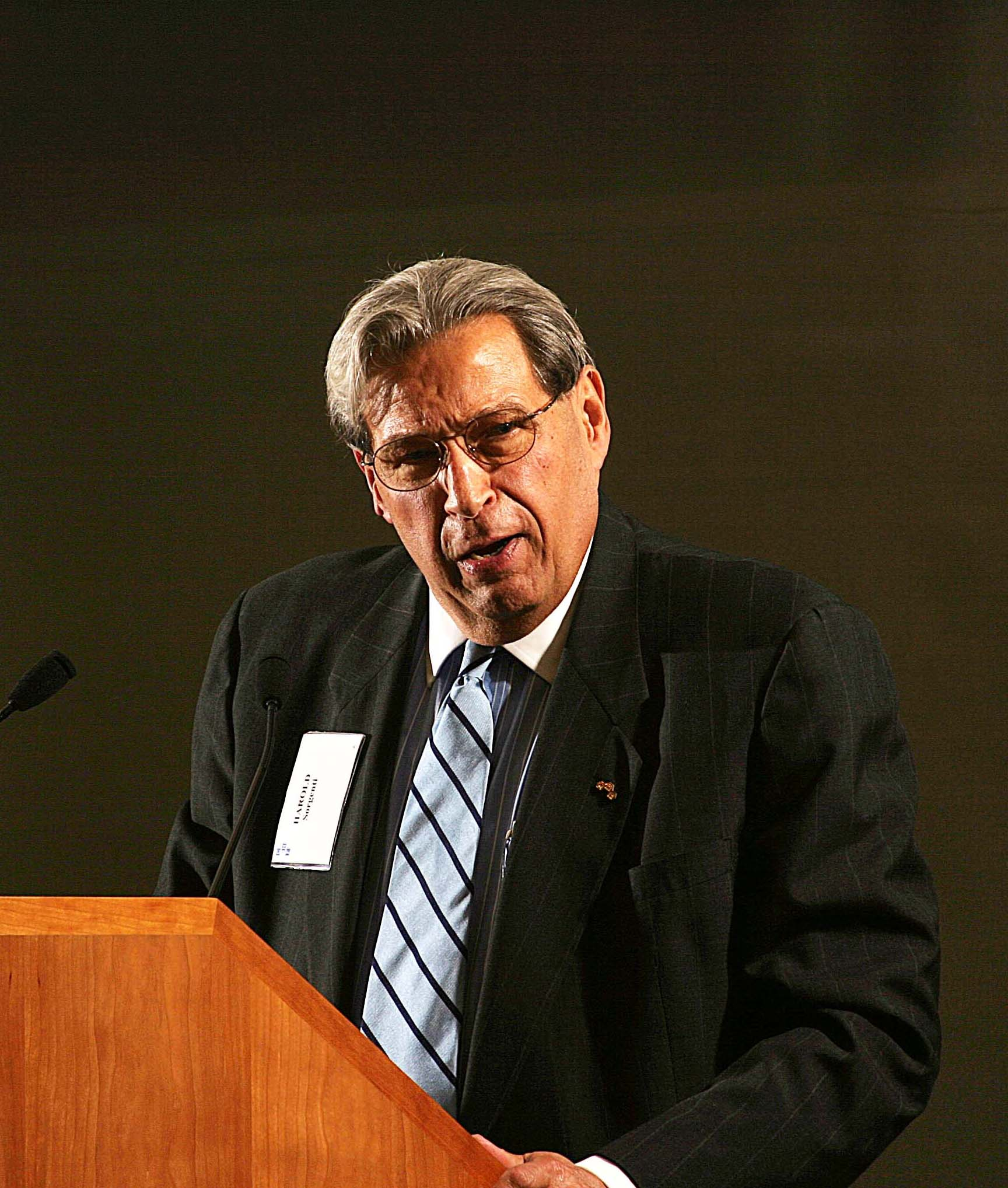
Harold Sorgenti (2003, photo from 2004)

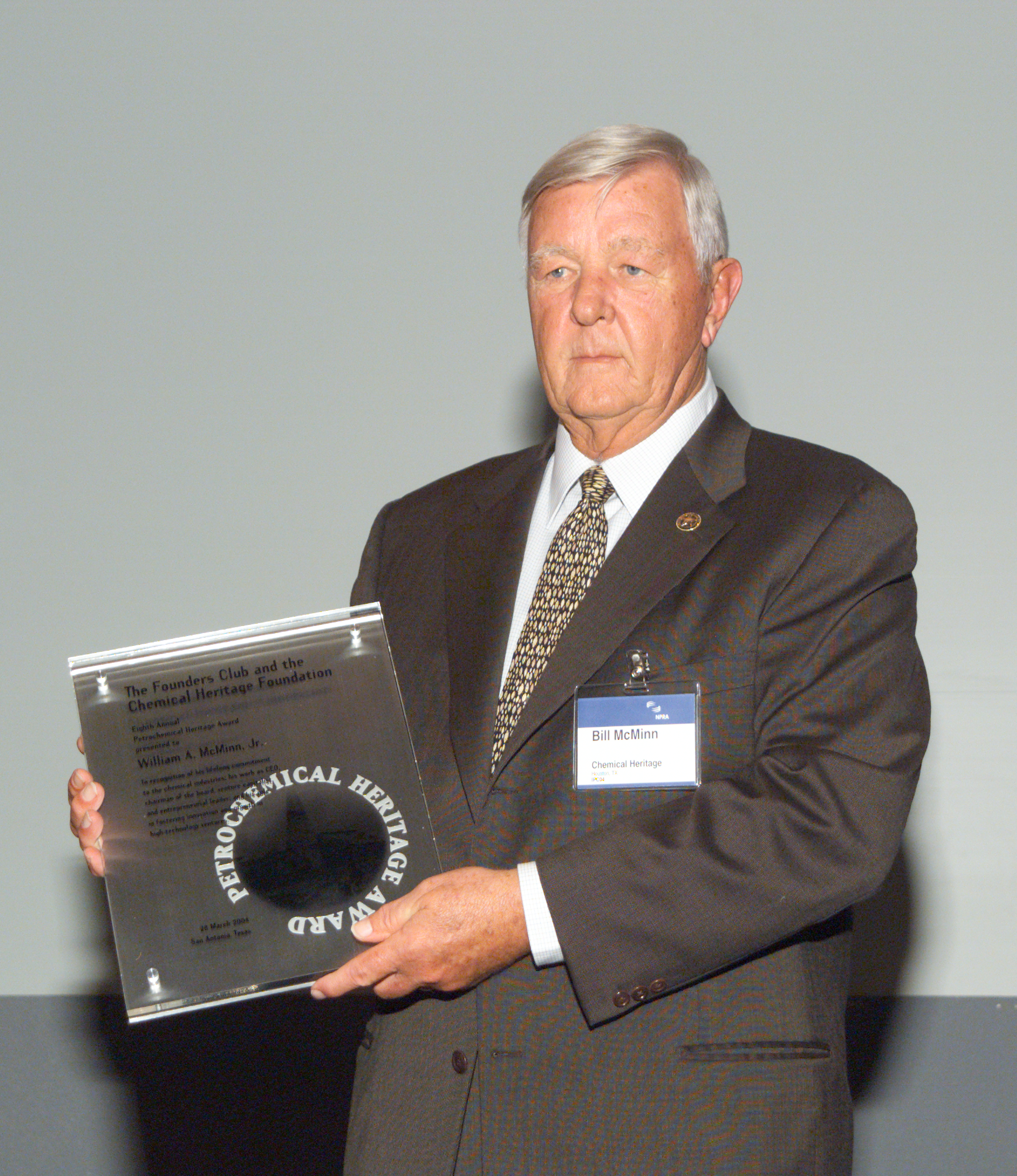
William A. McMinn, Jr. (2004)

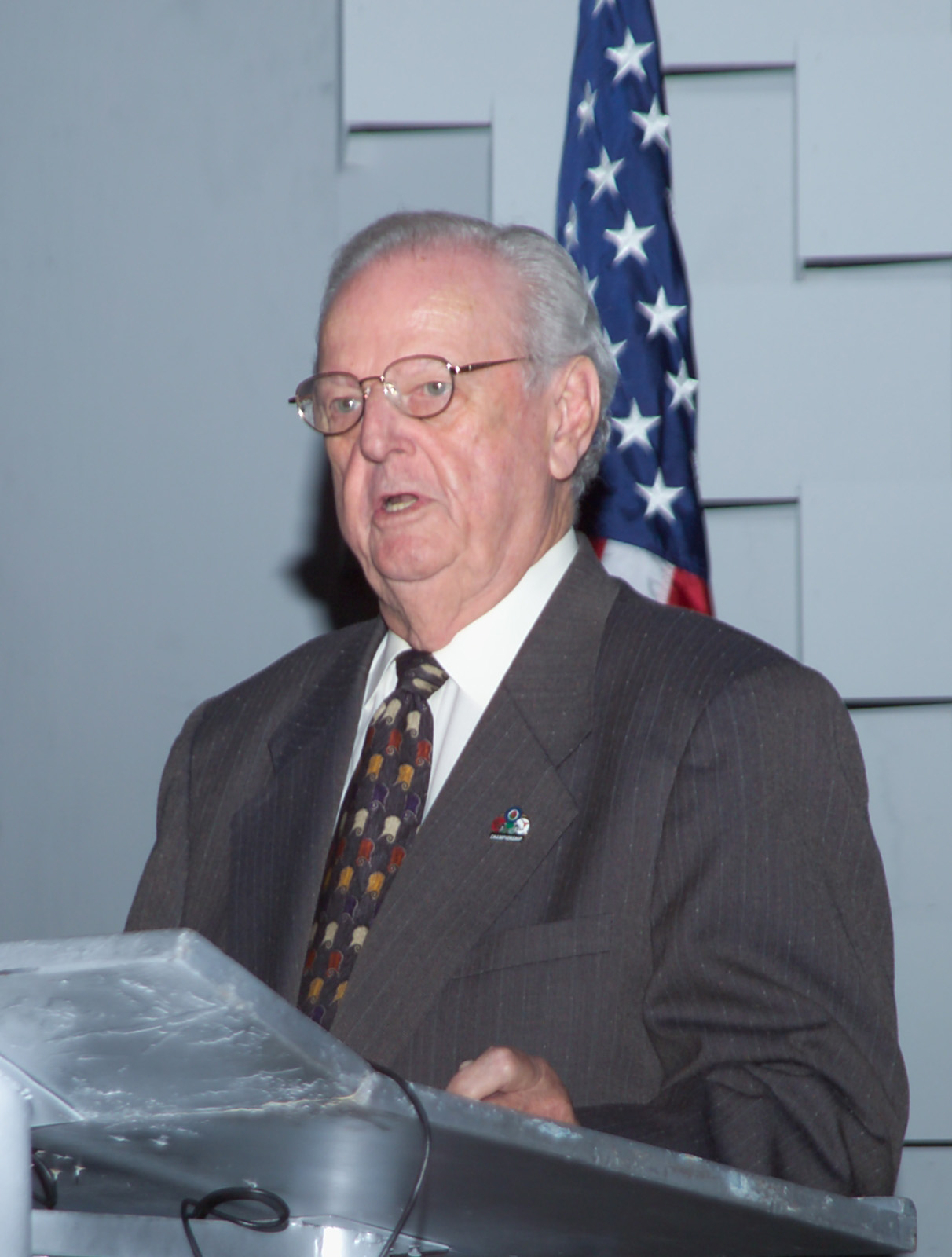
J. Virgil Waggoner (2006)

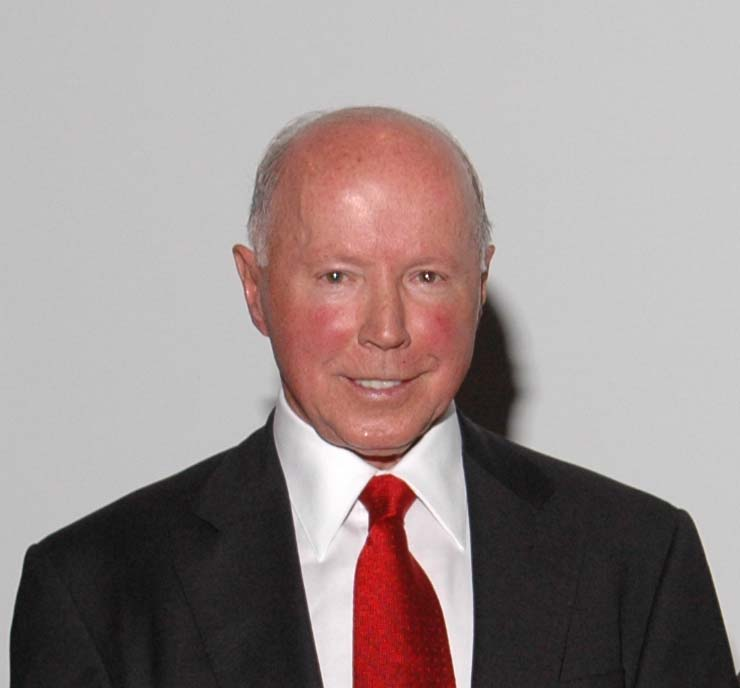
Dan L. Duncan (2007)

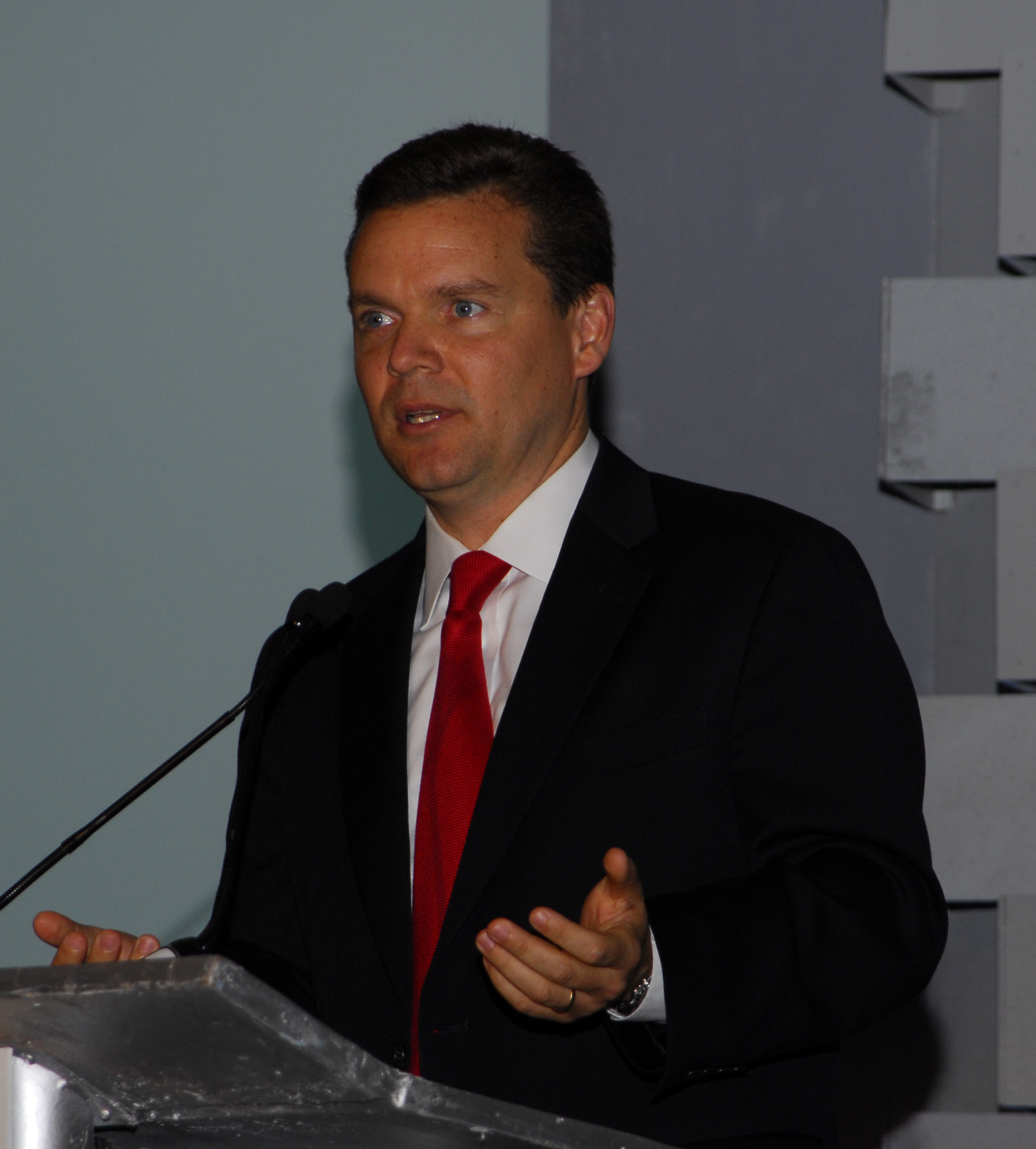
Peter R. Huntsman (2008)

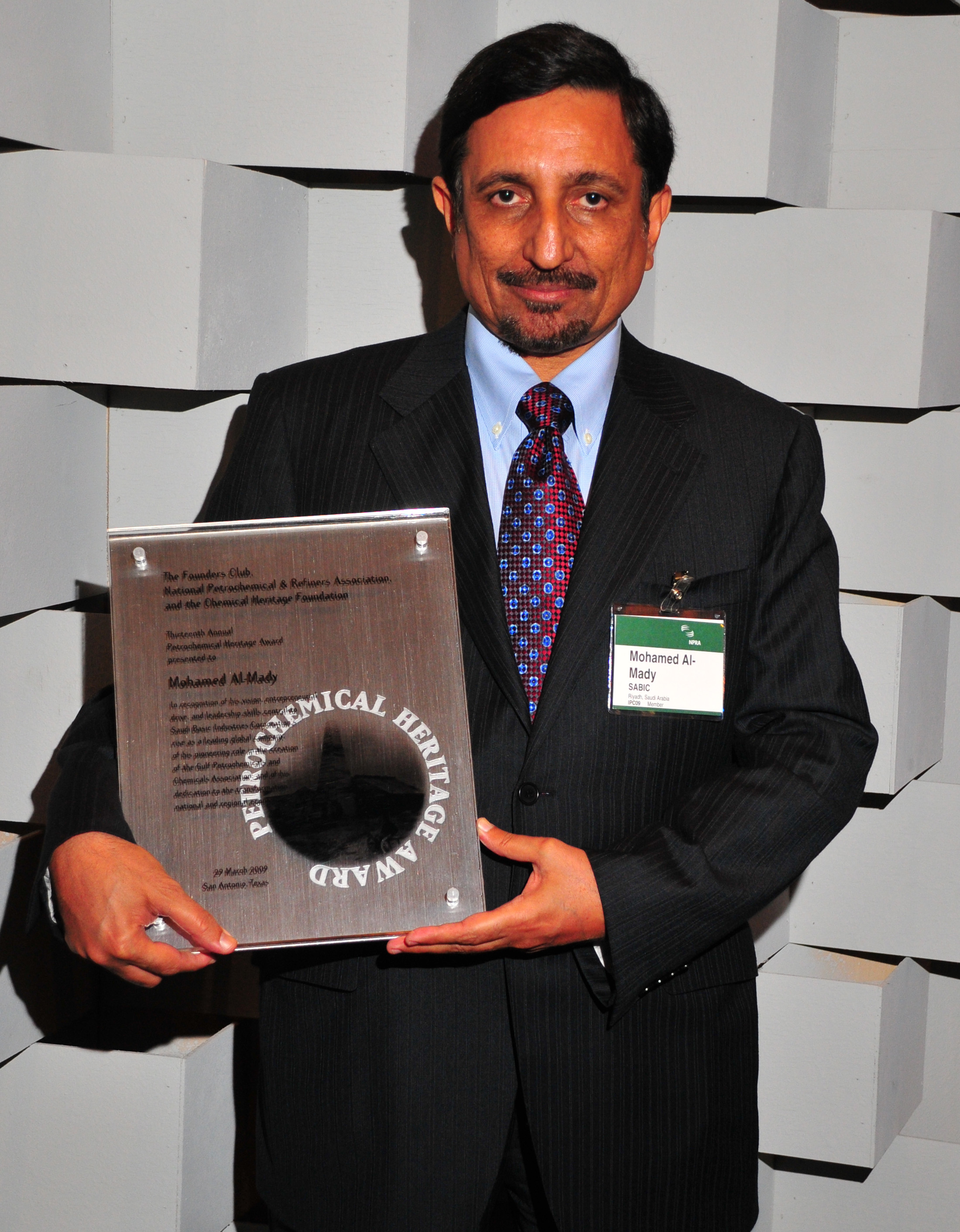
Mohamed Al-Mady (2009)

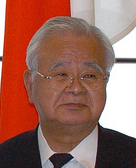
Hiromasa Yonekura (2010; photo from 2011)

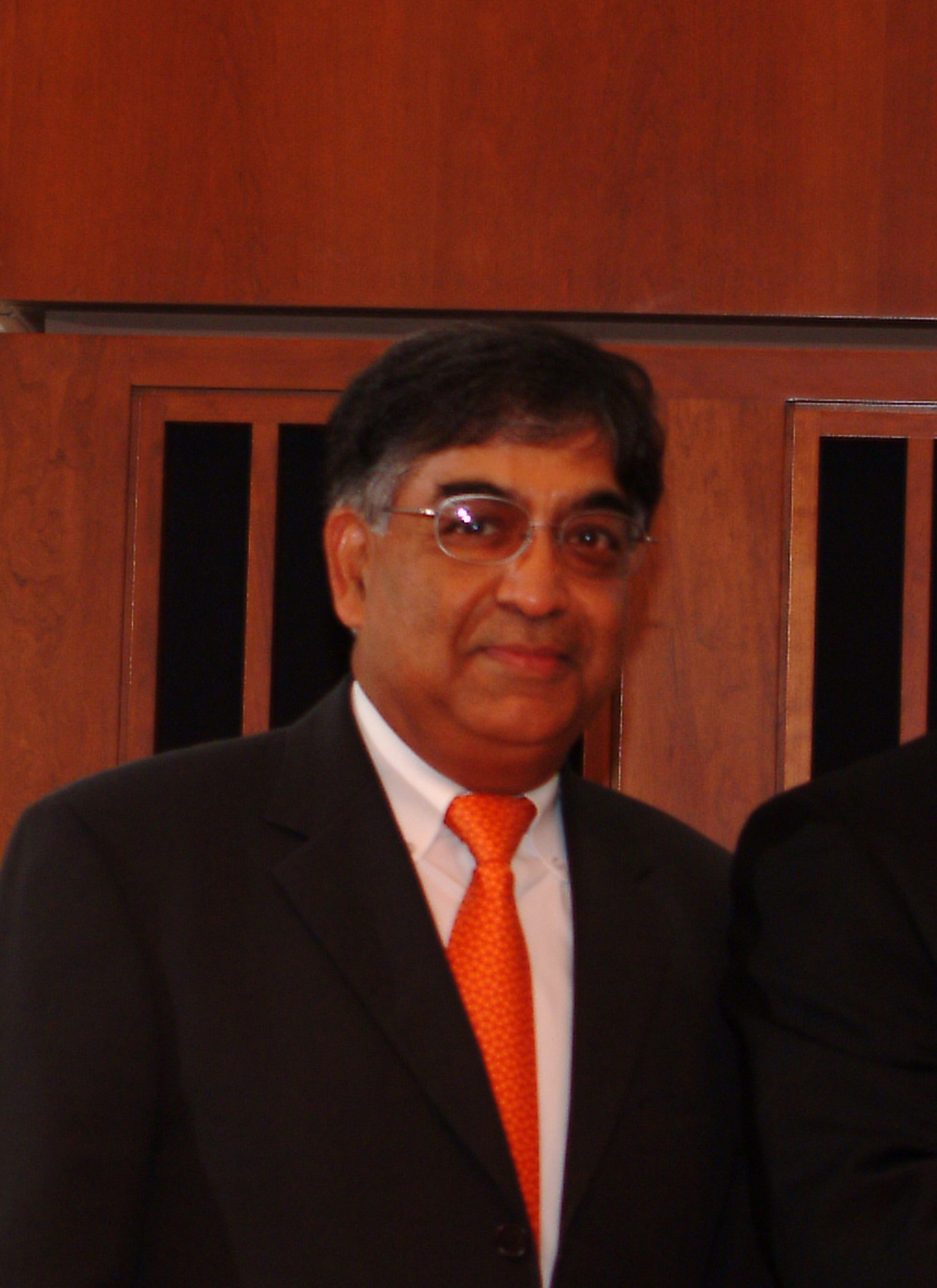
Rajiv L. Gupta (2011; photo from 2004)

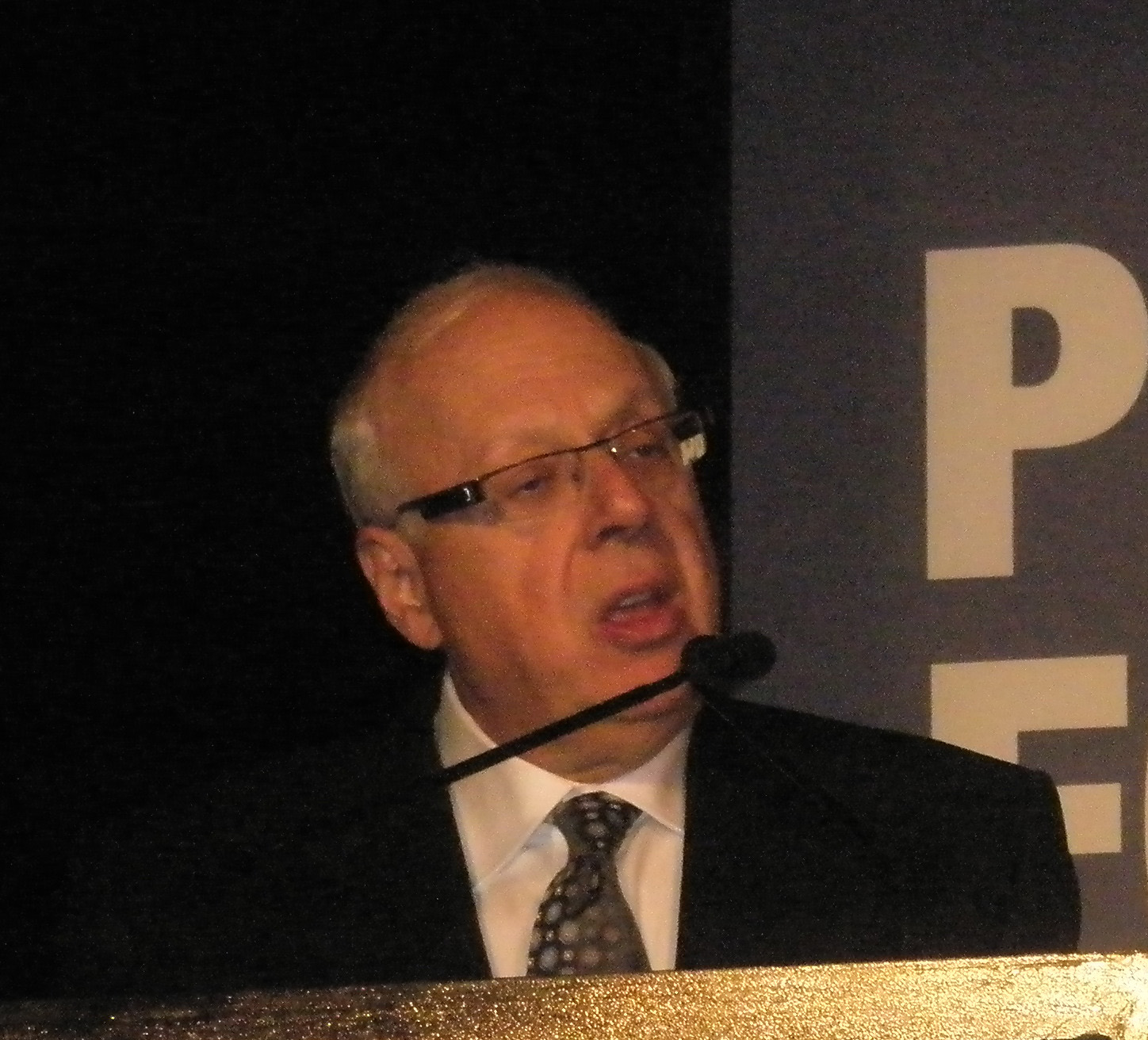
Marvin O. Schlanger (2012)

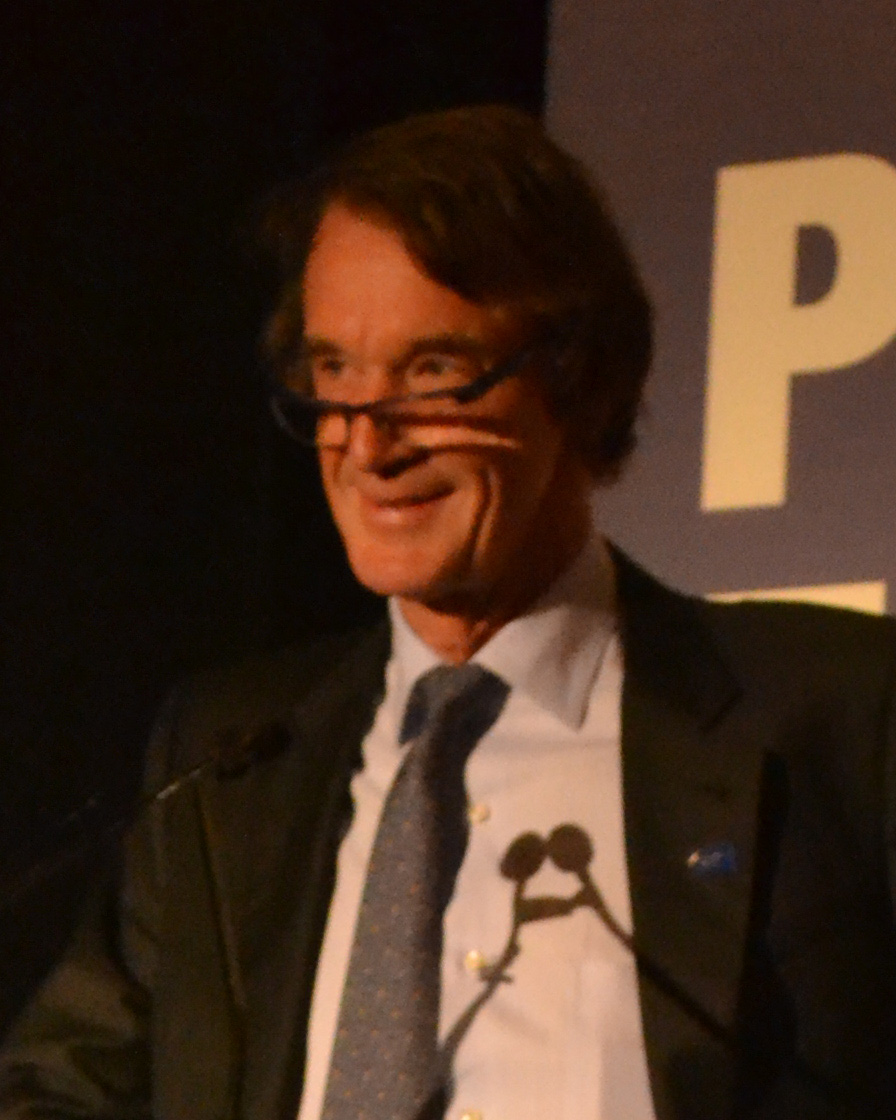
Jim Ratcliffe (2013)

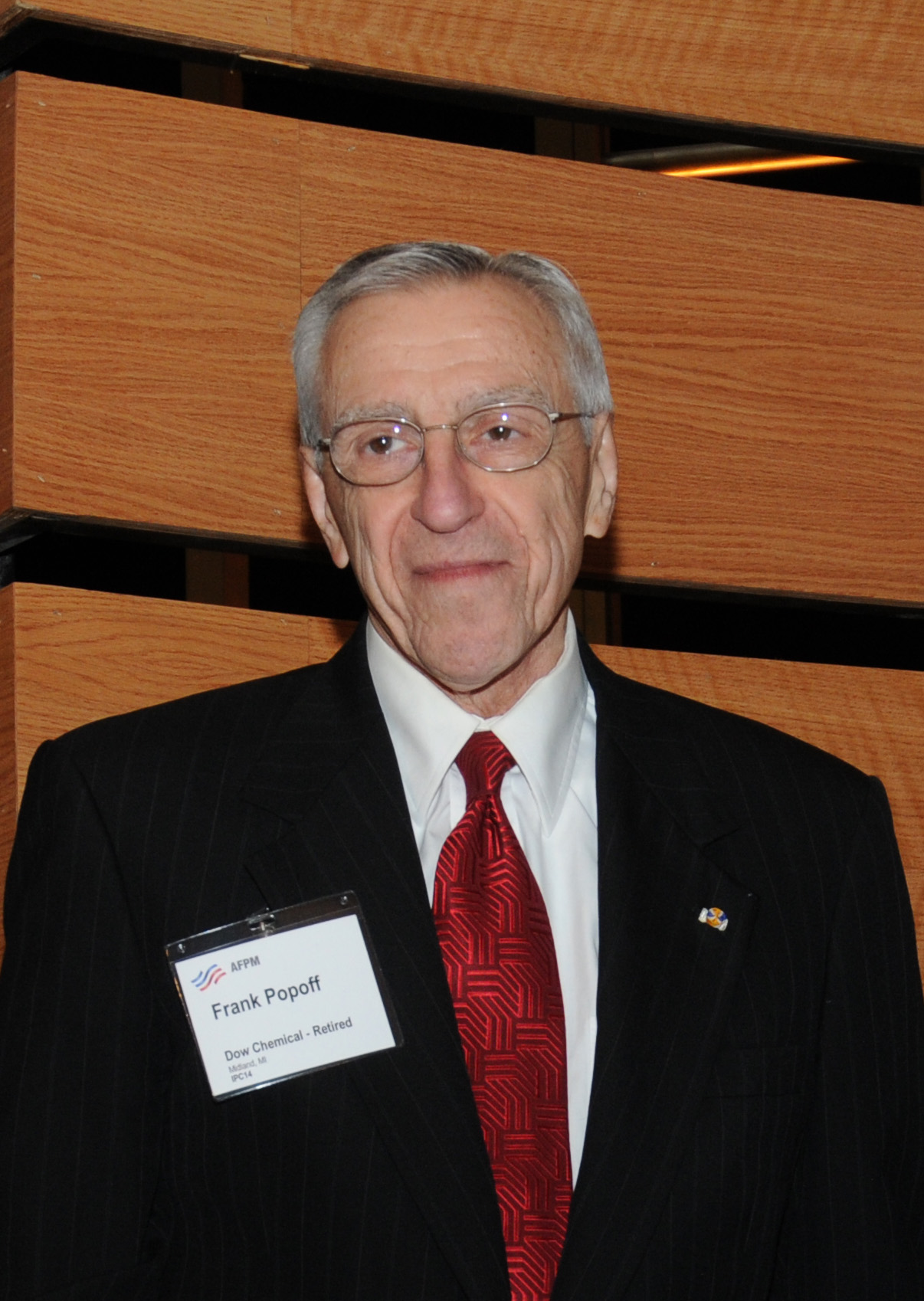
Frank Popoff (2014)

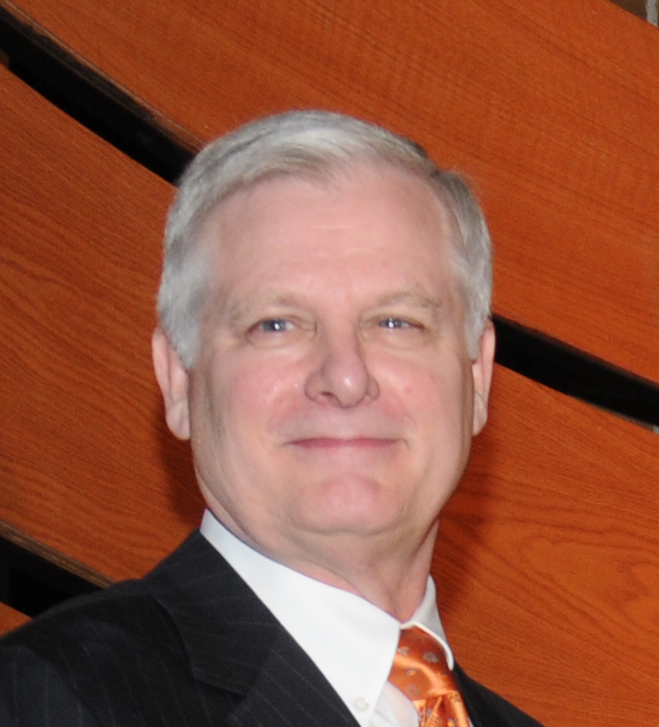
James L. Gallogly (2015)

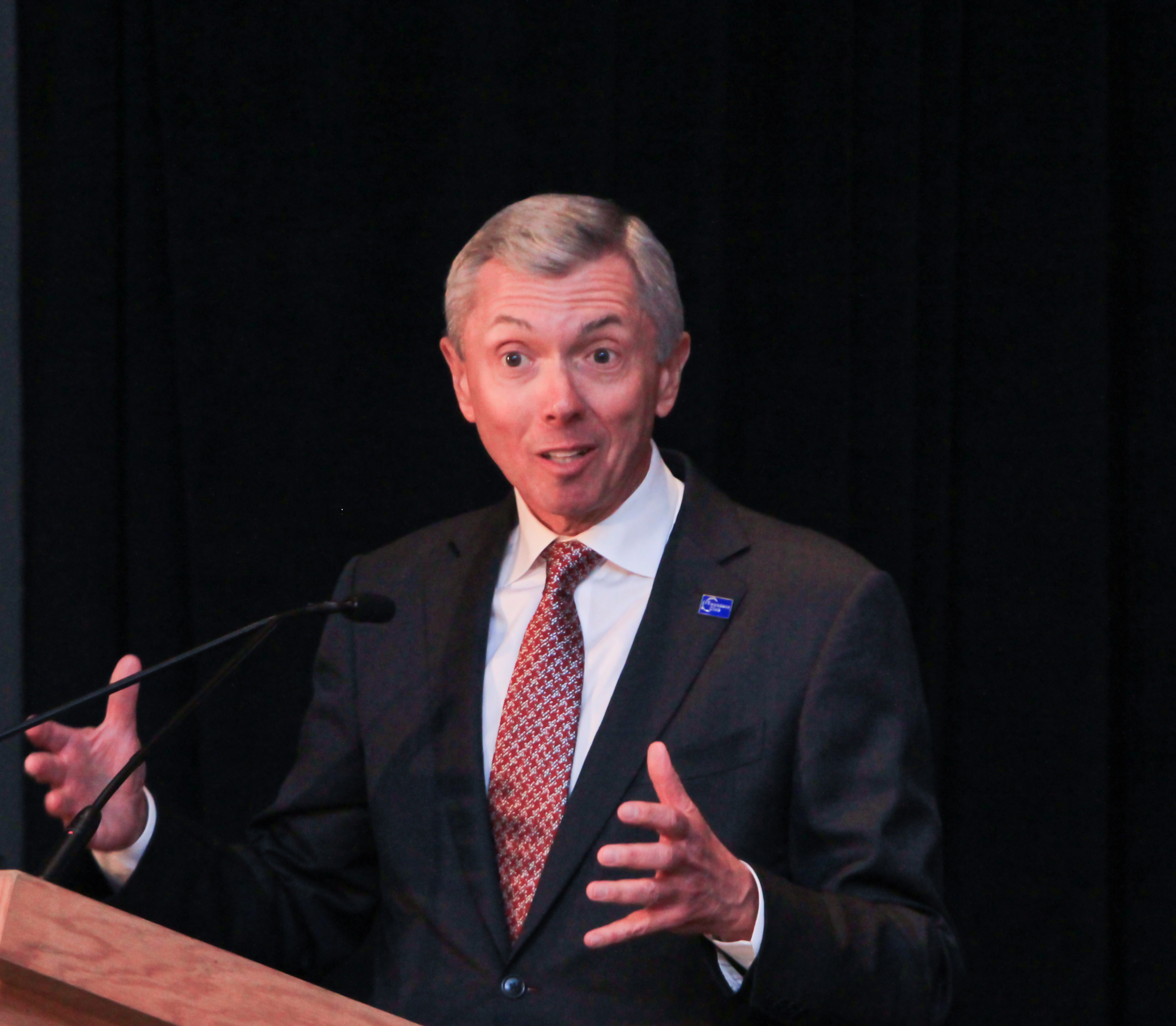
Stephen D. Pryor (2016)

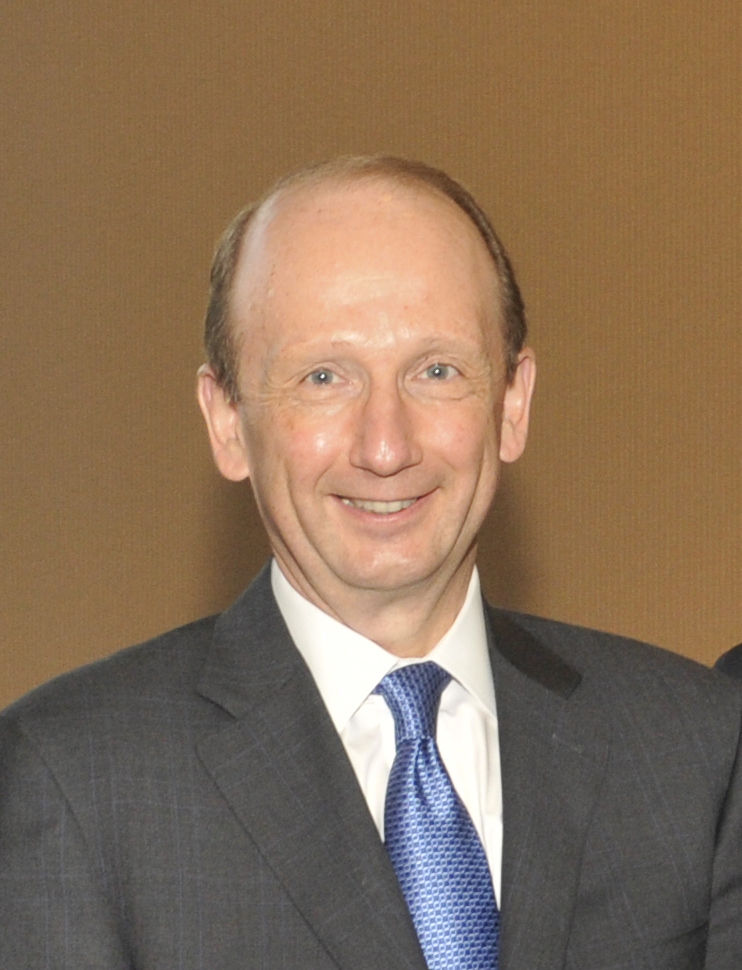
David N. Weidman (2017)

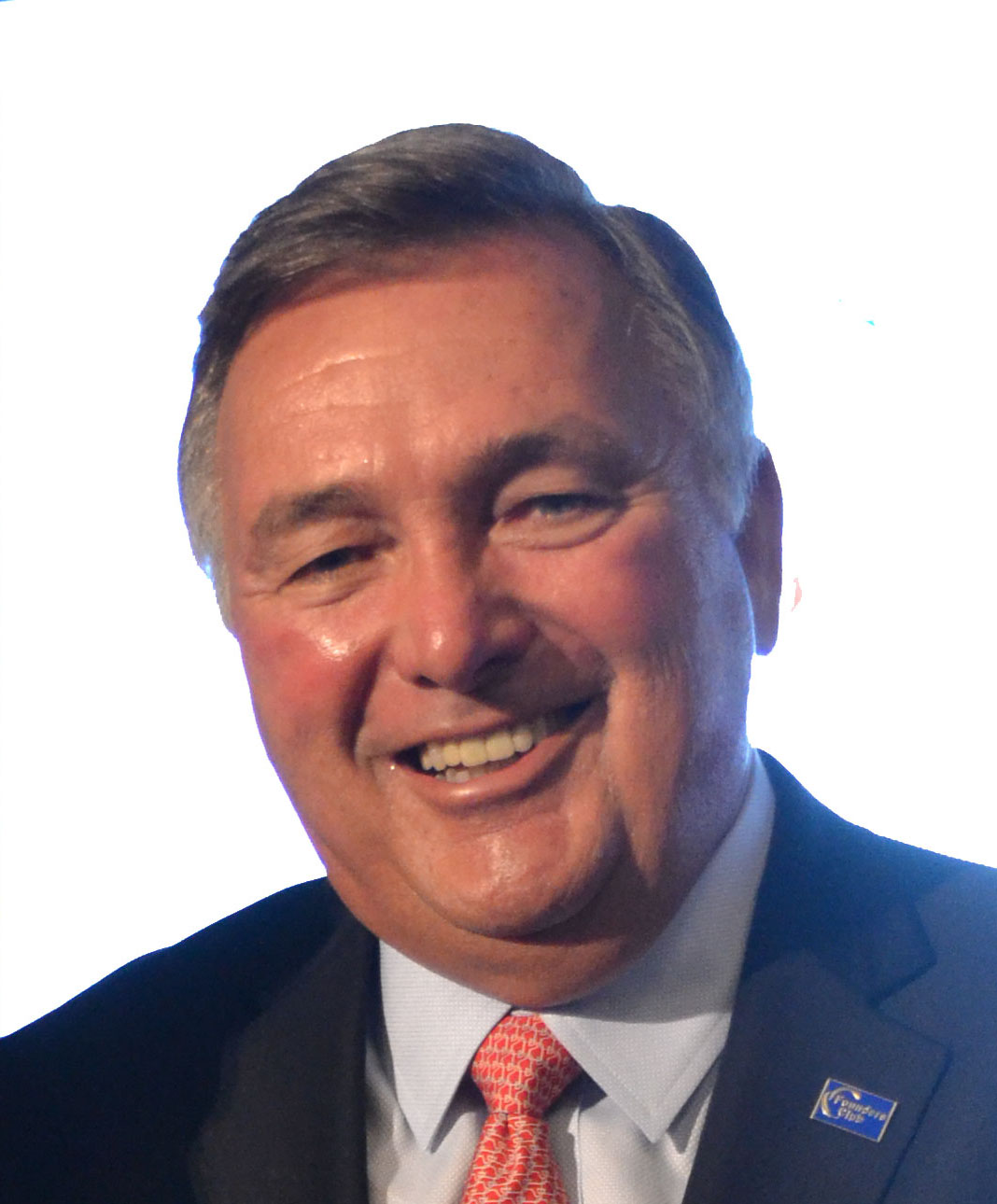
Gary K. Adams (2018)

== See also ==
- List of chemistry awards
