= Randa Williams =

American heiress (born 1962)

- Born: Randa Lynn Duncan; 1962
- Education: Rice University; University of Houston
- Occupation: Businesswoman
- Known for: Owning 8% of Enterprise Products
- Spouse: Charles Williams
- Children: 1
- Parent: Dan Duncan
- Family: Milane Duncan Frantz (sister); Dannine Duncan Avara (sister); Scott Duncan (brother)

Randa Lynn Williams (née Duncan, born 1962) is an American billionaire heir to the Duncan family fortune (through Enterprise Products, which remains under family control). She and her three siblings each hold an 8% stake in the family business.

== Biography ==
Randa Duncan was born to Barbara Ann and Dan Duncan. Her father, Dan Duncan, was the co-founder of Enterprise Products.

She has a JD from the University of Houston and a bachelor's degree from Rice University.

== Career ==
After college, she practiced law with Butler & Binion and Brown, Sims, Wise & White. Williams served as the president and chief executive officer (CEO) of Enterprise Products and vice president at Enterprise Products from 1994 to February 2001.

She inherited $3.1 billion upon the death of her father. Due to a temporary repeal in the estate tax law for the year 2010, Duncan became, along with her siblings, one of the first American billionaires to pay no estate tax since its enactment.

In 2019, she purchased Texas Monthly.

== Philanthropy ==
Williams is a member of the board of trustees for the Houston Zoo, was a member of the board of trustees for the Houston Museum of Natural Science since 1995 and its chairman. She was on the trustee boards for the Manned Space Flight Education Foundation, River Oaks Baptist School and the Houston A+ Challenge.

In 2013, Williams was elected as Enterprise Production Partners' non-executive chairman.

== Personal life ==
She lives in Houston with her husband, and they have one child.
