= Scott Duncan (businessman) =

American billionaire

- Born: Scott Daniel Duncan; 1983 (age 42–43)
- Education: Houston Community College
- Parent(s): Dan Duncan; Billie Duncan
- Family: Randa Duncan Williams (sister); Milane Duncan Frantz (sister); Dannine Duncan Avara (sister)

Scott Daniel Duncan (born 1983) is an American billionaire heir to the Duncan family fortune (through Enterprise Products, which remains under family control).

== Early life ==
Scott Duncan was born in 1983, the son of Billie and Dan Duncan, the co-founder of Enterprise Products. Scott's mother died when he was five years old and his father remarried, to Jan Ellis, when Scott was six years old.

== Career ==
Duncan is an investor. He inherited $3.1 billion upon the death of his father, along with each of his sisters inheriting the same share. Due to an elimination of the estate tax for the year 2010, Duncan became the first American billionaire to pay no estate tax since its enactment. According to 2018 Forbes 400, Duncan is worth $6.2 billion, and is one of the youngest billionaires in the US.

== Personal life ==
He lives in Houston.
