= Scott Duncan =

Scott Duncan may refer to:

- Scott Duncan (footballer) (1888–1975), Scottish footballer and manager
- Scott Duncan (businessman) (born 1983), American billionaire
- Scott Duncan (referee), English football referee
- Scott Duncan (tennis), British tennis player
- Scottie Duncan (fl. 1937–1940), American baseball player
