= Seaway Pipeline =

Location
- Country: United States
- State: Oklahoma; Texas
- Direction: North-South
- Start: Cushing, Oklahoma
- To: Jones Creek, Texas (adjacent to Freeport, Texas)

General information
- Type: Oil
- Owner: Enterprise Partners; Enbridge
- Operator: Seaway Crude Pipeline Company LLC
- Construction started: 1974
- Commissioned: 23 November 1976

Technical information
- Length: 760 mi (1,220 km)
- Maximum discharge: 0.4 million barrels per day (~2.0×10^{7} t/a)
- Diameter: 30 in (762 mm)

The Seaway Crude Pipeline System (SCPS), commonly known as the Seaway Pipeline, is an oil pipeline system which transports crude oil between Cushing, Oklahoma and Freeport, Texas, and through the Texas City, Texas Terminal and Distribution System on the Gulf Coast of the United States. The Seaway is an important crude oil transfer link between two petroleum regions within the United States.

Although Seaway shipped oil north (to Cushing) for many years, in June 2012 the flow of the system was reversed to ship oil south (out of Cushing).

== History ==
The Seaway Pipeline was originally built by a consortium of oil industry firms formed in 1974 named Seaway Pipeline, Inc. for transferring (then) cheap foreign oil from Texas ports to refineries in the Midwest. After two years of construction, the system became operational on 23 November 1976, and pumped crude oil north until 1982.

In 1984, the other consortium members were bought out by Phillips. Seeking to capitalize on the pipeline's location to gather raw natural gas in Oklahoma and Texas for transport to the company's refinery complex at Sweeny, Texas, and other refineries near Houston, Phillips converted the system to ship natural gas south instead of shipping crude oil north. Phillips called that arrangement the "Seagas Pipeline".

In 1995, Atlantic Richfield bought a 50% interest from Conoco through a subsidiary (ARCO Pipeline), and the system was converted from shipping natural gas south to shipping oil north to Cushing in 1996.

In 2000, Texas Eastern Products Pipeline Company (TEPP or TEPPCO), an indirect subsidiary of Duke Energy through TEPPCO Partners, bought the stock of ARCO Pipeline, acquiring their 50% interest in the system, and became the primary operator.

In 2005, Texas Eastern Products Pipeline, was acquired by Enterprise Products Partners L.P. in 2005, and Enterprise Products became the system operator with a 50% stake.

In late 2011, Canadian pipeline company Enbridge bought Conoco's remaining 50% interest in the company for $1.15 billion. The Seaway Crude Pipeline Company LLC (a joint venture between Enterprise Products and Enbridge) became the pipeline's operator.

In late May 2012, the Seaway's flow was reversed, and crude began arriving at Freeport on 6 June 2012.

On January 11, 2013, the Seaway's capacity was increased to 400,000 barrels per day (64,000 m^{3}/d).

On January 30, 2017, a Texas Department of Transportation crew accidentally dug into the Seaway Pipeline near Blue Ridge, Texas, causing a large spill. On January 30, 2017, a road crew punctured the Seaway pipeline near Dallas. Two days later, it was unclear how much oil had spilled over the nearby Highway 121. After the incident, supply concerns reportedly helped push oil prices 2% higher.

== Details ==
As of June 2012, the entire system is 670 miles (1,080 km) long, of which, 500 miles (800 km) are in the 30 inches (760 mm) long-haul (Cushing to Freeport) portion of the pipeline. The system was then capable of carrying approximately 180,000 barrels per day (29,000 m^{3}/d) of oil.

== Expansion plans ==
Plans have been announced to increase Seaway's capacity to 400,000 barrels per day (64,000 m^{3}/d) in 2013 (completed as of 11 January 2013) and, in 2014, adding 450,000 barrels per day (72,000 m^{3}/d) additional capacity via a "twin" long-haul pipeline. As well as for an 85 miles (137 km) lateral to the ECHO crude storage facility in southwest Houston and the Port Arthur/Beaumont refining complex.

== Competition ==
Several competing pipelines between Cushing and the Houston region have been proposed over the years, no other directly competing pipeline has yet been built. Although there is one larger pipeline which also connects the midwest with the Gulf Coast, the Capline, but which bypasses Cushing. The 40 inches (1,000 mm) Capline has been pumping offshore oil north from Louisiana to Patoka, Illinois since the 1960s.

However, planning for Phase 3 (a.k.a. the "Southern Leg", "Cushing MarketLink", or "Gulf Coast Pipeline Project") of the proposed Keystone XL show that it would run 435 miles (700 km) from Cushing to Nederland, Texas near Port Arthur, where it could tie into an existing 47 miles (76 km) pipeline to the Houston area.

== See also ==
- List of oil pipelines
