= James Chao =

James Chao may refer to:

- James S. C. Chao, founder of the Foremost Group
- James Y. Chao, co-founder of Westlake Chemical
