= Axiall =

Manufacturer and marketer of chlorovinyls and aromatics

Axiall Corporation
- Company type: Subsidiary
- Industry: Chemical
- Predecessor: Georgia Gulf Corporation
- Founded: 2013
- Founder: Ting Tsung Chao
- Headquarters: Atlanta, Georgia, USA
- Key people: James Chao(Chairman)
- Revenue: ▲US$ 8.6 billion(2018)
- Number of employees: 9,500
- Parent: Westlake Chemical
- Website: www.axiall.com

The Axiall Corporation is a manufacturer and marketer of chlorovinyls (caustic soda, chlorine, VCM, EDC, PVC resins, PVC rigid and flexible compounds) and aromatics (acetone, cumene, phenol). With the acquisition of Royal Group Technologies the company is now also a major producer of building materials ranging from piping and siding to window profiles, decking, and fencing.

The company operates 47 locations in numerous states such as Mississippi, Louisiana, Oklahoma, Michigan, Tennessee, and Texas, and is headquartered in Atlanta, Georgia. As of November, 2007 the company employed 6,214 full-time individuals.

The Georgia Gulf Corp. became the Axiall Corp. with the completion of its $2 billion acquisition of PPG Industries Inc.'s chlor-alkali and derivatives business in 2013. In 2014, Axiall entered a joint venture with Shriram Polytech India, forming Shriram Axiall. The two companies partnered together "to provide a technological thrust to the PVC offering for different industries".

Westlake Chemical Corporation acquired Axiall Corporation on August 31, 2016. The combined company became the third-largest chlor-alkali producer and the second-largest polyvinyl chloride (PVC) producer in North America.
