= Dannine Avara =

American billionaire

Dannine Duncan Avara
- Born: Dannine Duncan; 1964 (age 61–62)
- Spouse: married
- Parent(s): Dan Duncan; Billie Duncan
- Family: Randa Duncan Williams (sister); Milane Duncan Frantz (sister); Scott Duncan (brother)

Dannine Avara (née Duncan, born 1964), is a billionaire heir to the Duncan family, through Enterprise Products, an energy pipeline giant which remains under family control.

== Early life ==
Dannine Avara was born in 1964 to Barbara and Dan Duncan. Barbara was Dan's first wife. Her father, Dan Duncan, was the co-founder of Enterprise Products.

== Career ==
Avara is an investor. She inherited $3.1 billion upon the death of her father. Due to a temporary repeal of the estate tax law for the year 2010, Duncan became, along with her siblings, the first American billionaires to pay no estate tax since its enactment.

== Personal life ==
Avara is married and lives in Houston. Avara's net worth is estimated to be $6.2 billion as of 2019.
