= Vivek M. Shah =

American former actor and litigant

- Born: July 15, 1987 (age 39); Akron, Ohio, U.S.
- Occupations: Former actor, litigant
- Known for: 2012 extortion scheme targeting Harvey Weinstein and others; serial CIPA litigation

Vivek M. Shah (born July 15, 1987) is an American former actor and pro se litigant. He is known for his involvement in a 2012 federal extortion scheme targeting several high-profile individuals, including film producer Harvey Weinstein, and for filing numerous lawsuits under the California Invasion of Privacy Act (CIPA) that resulted in him being declared a vexatious litigant in the Central District of California in 2026.

== Education and acting career ==
Shah studied at Columbia College Chicago and trained at the Chicago Actors Studio and The Second City Training Center.

Shah appeared in small and uncredited roles in the late 2000s and early 2010s, including an uncredited part in The Dark Knight (2008), as well as appearances on the television series Bones and Outsourced, and in the film Our Family Wedding.

== 2012 extortion scheme and conviction ==
In 2012, Shah mailed threatening letters styled as “Extortion Notices” to seven wealthy individuals, demanding a total of more than $122 million wired to offshore accounts. The letters named specific family members of the recipients and threatened to kill them if the demands were not met.

Targets included film producer Harvey Weinstein ($4 million demanded), Groupon co-founder Eric Lefkofsky ($16 million), coal executive Chris Cline ($13 million), and others such as Terry Pegula, Gary Goetzman, Ryan Kavanaugh, and Dannine Avara.

He was arrested by the FBI on August 10, 2012, in Schaumburg, Illinois. In May 2013, he pleaded guilty in the U.S. District Court for the Southern District of West Virginia to one count of transferring threatening communications in interstate commerce and seven counts of mailing threatening communications. On September 11, 2013, he was sentenced to 87 months in federal prison followed by three years of supervised release.

== Later litigation ==
Following his release from prison around 2019, Shah filed multiple pro se lawsuits. Starting in the early 2020s, he sent thousands of demand letters and filed numerous nearly identical complaints alleging violations of the California Invasion of Privacy Act (CIPA), primarily related to website tracking technologies and analytics tools.

On July 20, 2026, U.S. District Judge R. Gary Klausner in the Central District of California declared Shah a vexatious litigant in the case Vivek Shah v. Crain Communications, Inc. The court imposed a narrowly tailored pre-filing order requiring prior judicial approval for any new CIPA or related digital-privacy claims filed in that district.
