= Gary Adams =

Gary Adams may refer to:

- Gary Adams (baseball) (born 1939), American college baseball coach
- Gary Adams (golf) (1943–2000), salesman and founder of TaylorMade Golf
- Gary K. Adams, president and CEO of CMAI
