= Stephen D. Pryor =

American business executive

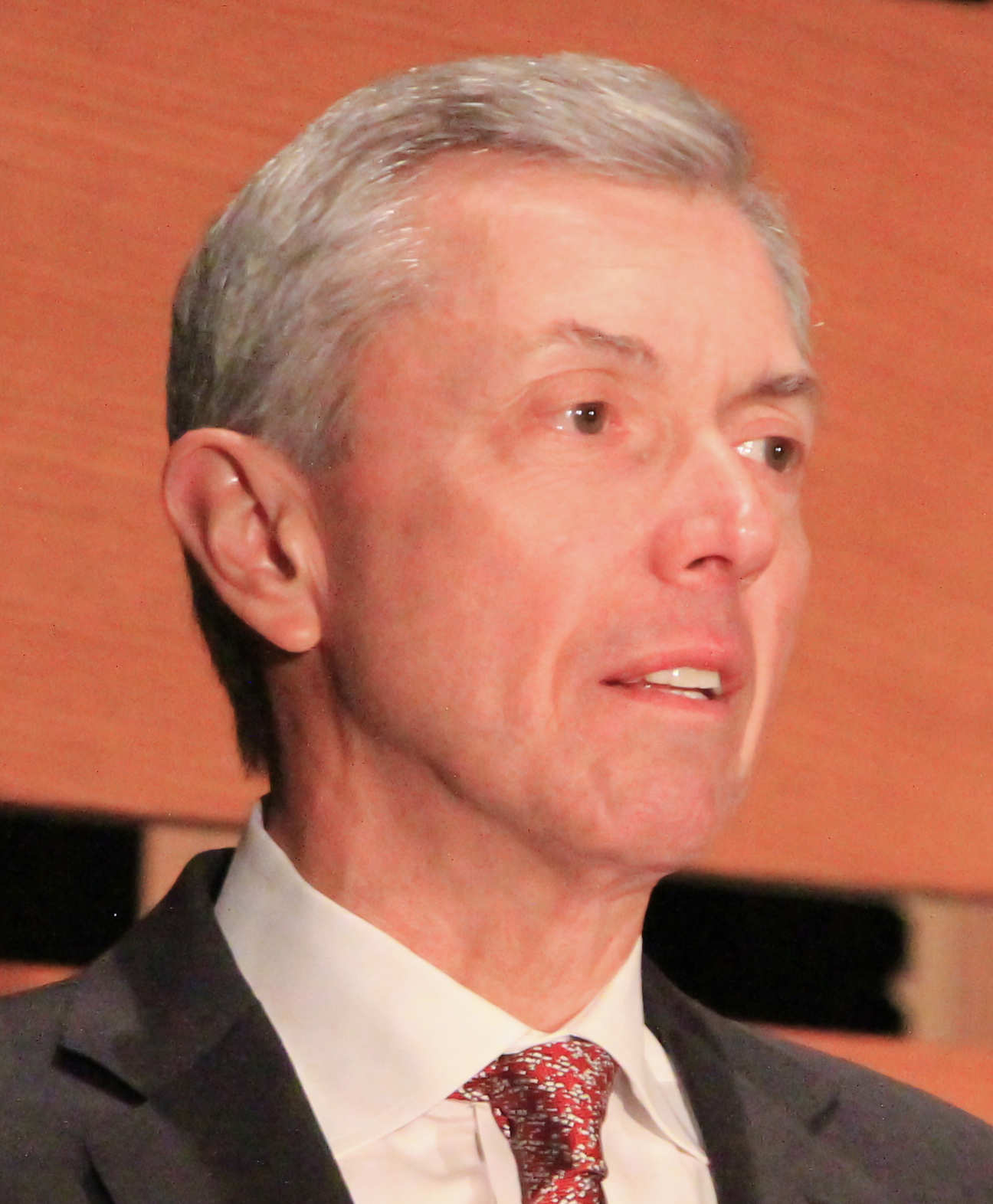
- Stephen Pryor, 2011
- Born: c. 1949 (age 76–77); New York, NY, United States
- Education: Lafayette College, Harvard University
- Occupation: Business executive
- Known for: President at ExxonMobil Chemical Company (2008-2015); vice-president of Exxon Mobil Corporation (2004-2015)

Stephen D. Pryor is an American business executive who was president of ExxonMobil Chemical Company (a subsidiary of Exxon Mobil Corporation) from April 1, 2008 to January 1, 2015, and was vice-president of Exxon Mobil Corporation from December 1, 2004 to January 1, 2015.

He retired as of January 1, 2015. He is one of the top three shareholders of ExxonMobil stock. Pryor joined Mobil Corporation in 1971, and from then on held various national and international positions.

== Early life and education ==
Pryor was born in New York, NY. He has a bachelor's degree in Biology from Lafayette College and a master's degree in Business Administration from Harvard University.

== Career ==
External videos
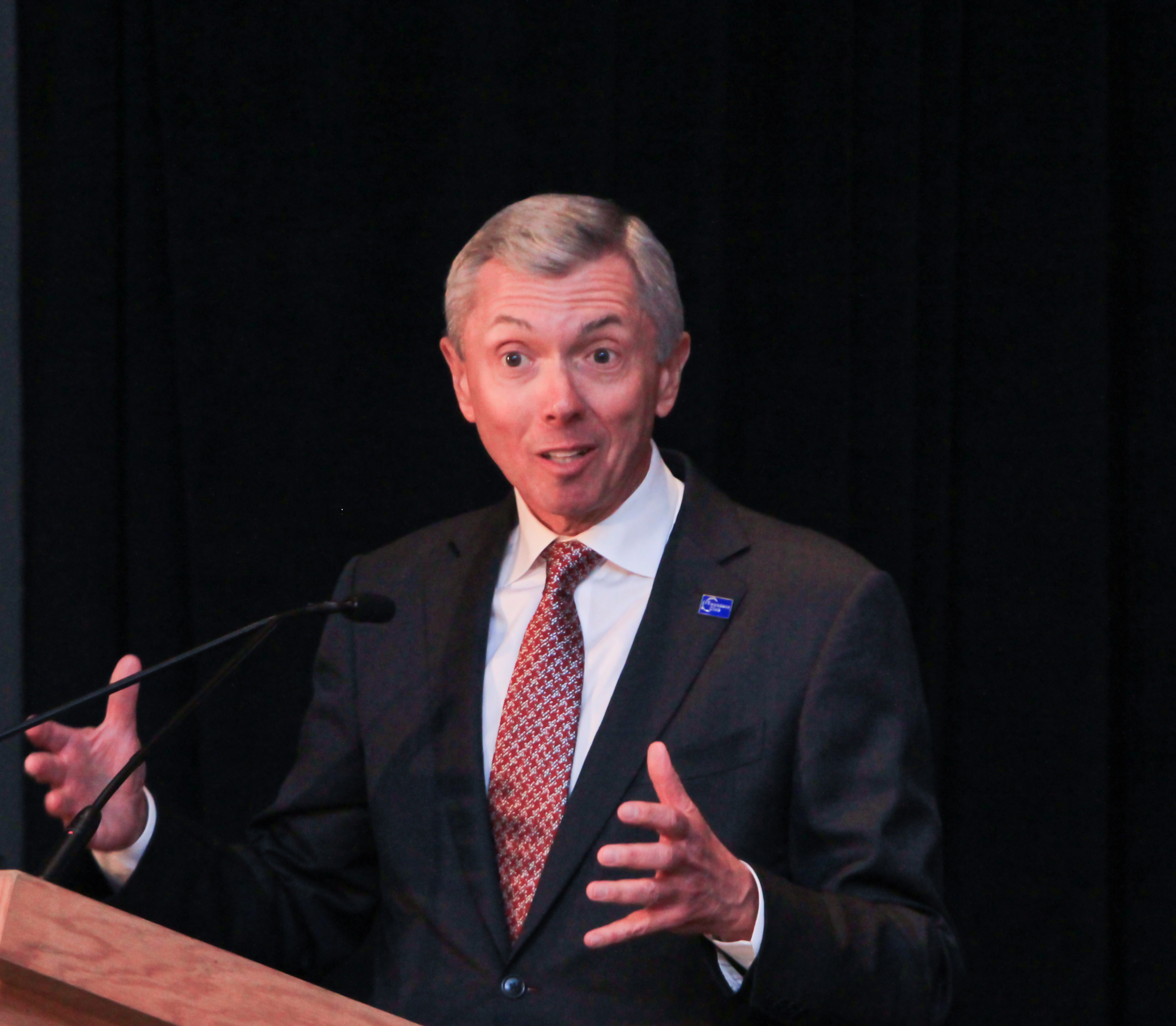
- “Interview with Stephen D. Pryor ”, 2013, IHS World Petrochemical Conference
- “Stephen Pryor '71 and Jack Neal Answer Questions About Natural Gas Extraction”, 2012, Lafayette College

Pryor joined Mobil Corporation in 1971, where he held various financial and managerial positions with the company. These have included positions as general manager in Cyprus and New Zealand; as vice president of Mobil Chemical Company in the United States; and as president of Mobil Asia Pacific. After Exxon and Mobil merged in 1999, Pryor became president of the ExxonMobil Lubricants & Specialties Company and a vice president of Exxon Mobil Corporation.

In 2002 he became executive vice president of ExxonMobil Chemical Company and in 2004, president of ExxonMobil Refining & Supply Company. He was vice-president of Exxon Mobil Corporation from December 1, 2004 to January 1, 2015, and served as president of ExxonMobil Chemical Company (a subsidiary of Exxon Mobil Corporation) from April 1, 2008 to January 1, 2015.

Pryor has served on the Executive Strategy Group of the International Council of Chemical Associations (ICCA), and is a proponent of the Responsible Care initiative, a voluntary global initiative to improve health, safety, and environmental performance within the chemical industry.

== Recognition ==
- 2015, Chemical Industry Medal from the Society of Chemical Industry
- 2015, Petrochemical Heritage Award from The Founders Club and the Chemical Heritage Foundation
