= 2024 Southern Ute Gasoline Spill =

Colorado gas spill

The 2024 Southern Ute Gasoline Spill (also known as La Plata County gasoline spill incident) occurred on December 5, 2024, when approximately 97,000 gallons (544 barrels) of refined, unleaded gasoline leaked from an underground pipeline owned by Enterprise Products on the Florida Mesa in La Plata County, Colorado. It is the largest gasoline spill in Colorado since 2019.

== Spill ==
The spill took place on fee land located within the boundaries of the Southern Ute Indian Tribe reservation. It resulted in the contamination of dirt and drinking water wells. Enterprise paid for some residents to be temporarily relocated due to the contamination, but did not reveal what led to the spill and refused to answer questions from the press. The spill originated from a section of Enterprise Products' Mid-America Pipeline System, which runs from Hobbs, New Mexico, north through New Mexico, Colorado, Utah, and Wyoming. The pipeline was constructed in the 1980s but the project to convert it to carry refined gasoline was completed in 2024. Enterprise had SCADA and computational pipeline monitoring leak detection systems in place, which were operational, but neither system detected the leak. Industry experts stated it was normal for these system to fail to detect a leak of this size. Instead, the leak was reported by a neighbor and the pipeline was manually shut down 26 minutes later. Originally, Enterprise estimated 22,900 gallons of gasoline was spilled. However they updated their estimate to 97,000 gallons after cleaning up 20,000 gallons. This is the largest spill since Colorado began tracking their size in 2016.

Rainbow Springs Trout Farm, located a few miles from the spill site, reported an unprecedented die-off of approximately 80,000 trout fingerlings around December 10, 2024. Samples from the farm's spring did not show contamination at the time they were taken, and Enterprise reportedly refused to compensate for the estimated $100,000 loss.

== Clean up ==
Cleanup and remediation efforts are ongoing, primarily conducted by Enterprise Products under the oversight of Colorado Department of Public Health and Environment (CDPHE). However, Southern Ute Chairman Melvin Baker said that Enterprise is not acting swiftly enough. He pointed out that CDPHE did not send anyone to inspect the site until May 1, 2025. He emphasized how Enterprise's focus on addressing immediate property damage contrasted with the Tribe's perspective as stewards of the land; damages to wildlife and vegetation represent long-lasting impacts not being fully accounted for or respected by Enterprise. CDPHE expects that responding to the spill will take years. By the end of August 20,000 gallons had been recovered. The federal Environmental Protection Agency began joint monitoring of the clean up in 2025.
