= Dan Duncan =

American businessman (1933–2010)

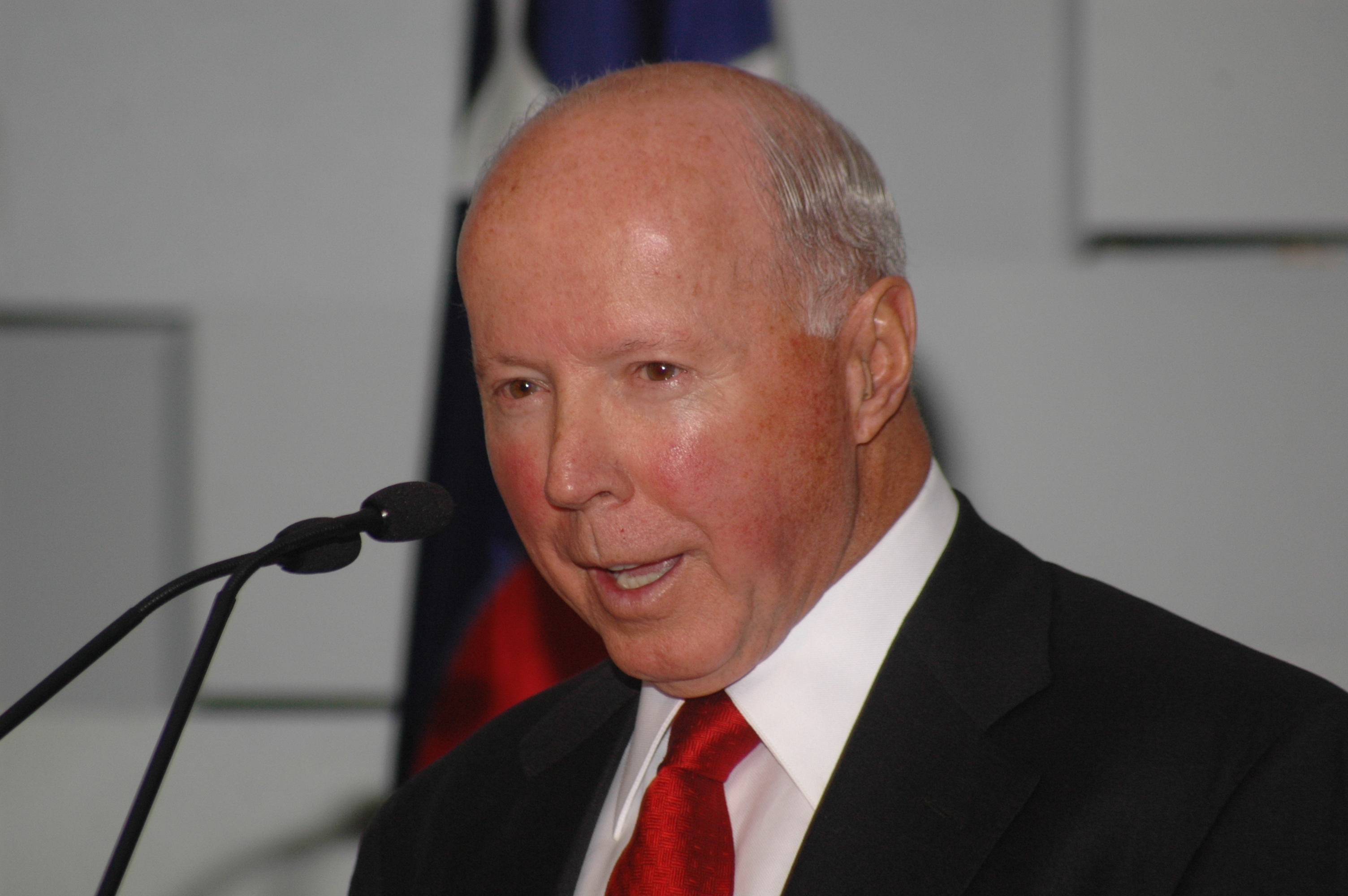
- Born: Dan L. Duncan; January 2, 1933; Shelby County, Texas, U.S.
- Died: March 29, 2010 (aged 77); River Oaks, Houston, Texas, U.S.
- Known for: co-founder, chairman and majority shareholder of Enterprise Products
- Spouse(s): Barbara Ann Duncan (m. 1958; div. 1971) Billie Duncan (m. 1974; died 1988) Janet Ellis Duncan (m. 1989)
- Children: Randa Duncan Williams; Milane Duncan Frantz; Dannine Duncan Avara; Scott Duncan
- Awards: Petrochemical Heritage Award

Dan L. Duncan (January 2, 1933 – March 29, 2010) was an American entrepreneur born in Center, Texas. He was the co-founder, chairman and majority shareholder of Enterprise Products.

== Early life and education ==
Duncan was born in 1933 in rural Shelby County, Texas. His father was a farmer. His mother died of tuberculosis when he was seven and his brother died of blood poisoning in the same year. He lived with his grandmother until he graduated from Shelbyville High School in 1949. He joined his father as a pipeliner and roughneck in the oil and gas fields. Soon after his father also died of leukemia. Duncan served in the United States Army from 1953 to 1955 where he was stationed in Germany with radio communications after the Korean War. Upon leaving the army, he used the G.I. Bill to study business, finance and accounting at Massey Business College in Houston while also working at the U.S. Post Office.

== Career ==
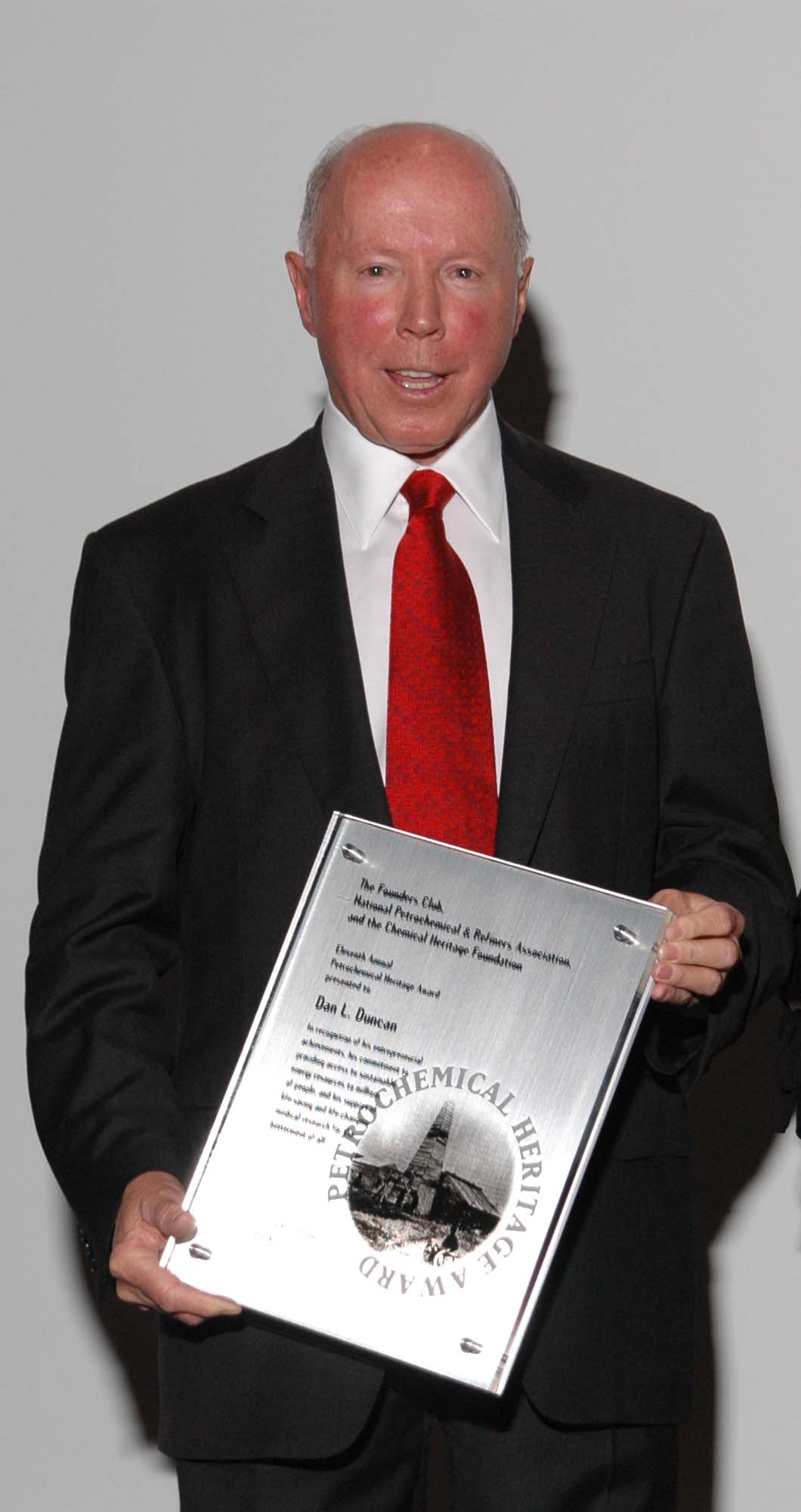
Dan Duncan with the Petrochemical Heritage Award, 2007

In 1957, he went to work for Wanda Petroleum, a midstream pipeline company In 1968, he left Wanda, and with $10,000 and two propane delivery trucks, helped found Enterprise Products Co. In 1998, he took Enterprise Products Partners LP public. In 2010, Enterprise owned over 48,700 miles of onshore and offshore pipelines and nearly 220 million barrel equivalents of natural gas and natural gas liquids of storage capacity. He also headed mid-stream energy firms Duncan Energy Partners LP (NYSE: DEP) and Enterprise GP Holdings LP (NYSE: EPE). In 2007, he received the Petrochemical Heritage Award in recognition of his work.

== Philanthropy ==
Duncan donated $75 million to Texas Children's Hospital and the Houston Museum of Natural Science, as well as $135 million to Baylor College of Medicine. Duncan donated a sculpture by Jean Dubuffet named "Monument au Fantôme" to Discovery Green Park near the George R. Brown Convention Center.

== Hunting activities ==
Duncan owned the Double D Ranch, a 5,000-acre (20 km^{2}) hunting property in Texas. Duncan was a Safari Club International member who has been given numerous awards for his hunting trophies. In 2006, he received the SCI World Conservation Hunting Award, which requires a hunter to have hunted on six continents, and have received SCI's 13 "Grand Slam" awards, 22 "Inner Circle" awards, the Fourth Pinnacle of Achievement Award and the Crowning Achievement Award. Duncan has 407 entries in SCI's trophy record book, including records for killing lions, elephants, rhinoceroses, a polar bear, and other animals.

On July 18, 2007, Duncan voluntarily appeared before a grand jury in Houston. He answered questions regarding a hunt in Russia in 2002 in which he shot and killed a moose and a wild sheep from a helicopter, which is illegal under Russian law. He admitted to his actions, but said that he did not know that his actions were illegal. His attorney said on September 12, 2007, that a grand jury had declined to bring charges against Duncan and other hunters who had been on the trip.

== Wealth ==
According to Forbes magazine, in 2007, Duncan was the richest person in the city of Houston and the 3rd richest person in Texas, with a net worth of 8.2 billion dollars (according to page 46 in the October 27, 2008, issue of Forbes, Duncan's net worth dropped from 7.6 billion on Aug 29 to 6.3 billion on October 1) . He was worth 9.0 billion at the time of his death.

== Personal life ==
Duncan was married three times. First to Barbara Ann Aycock Duncan (married 1958, divorced 1971), secondly to Billie Ruth Bearden Duncan (married 1974, died 1988 from ovarian cancer), and lastly to Jan Ellis Duncan (married 1989). Duncan had three of his children, Randa, Dannine, and Milane with Barbara Duncan. He and Billie adopted a son, Scott.

Duncan was married to Janet Ellis from 1989 until his death. He married Jan after the death of his second wife Billie. Barbara Ann died of cancer, like his second wife, in 2004. He is survived by four children, each of whom is now a billionaire. Randa Duncan Williams (born 1962), Milane Duncan Frantz (born 1970), and Dannine Duncan Avarra. Scott Duncan (born 1983) was adopted during his marriage to Billie. He had no children with his third wife.

Duncan died aged 77 of a cerebral hemorrhage at his ranch in Smithville, Texas on March 29, 2010. Due to the repeal of the estate tax law for the year 2010, Duncan's heirs became the first American billionaires to pay no estate tax since its enactment.

== See also ==
- List of billionaires
