= Dixie Pipeline =

Propane pipeline in the southern US

The Dixie Pipeline is a 1,307-mile (2,103 km) long propane pipeline, varying from 6–12 inches (15–30 cm), running from Gulf of Mexico fractioners and refineries to delivery points in Louisiana, Mississippi, Alabama, Georgia, South Carolina, and North Carolina. It includes a 204-mile (328 km) lateral into south Georgia. It is currently owned by Enterprise Products Partners.

== Accidents and incidents ==
On November 1, 2007, a 12-inch-diameter section of Dixie Pipeline, transporting liquid propane at about 1,405 pounds per square inch, ruptured in a rural area near Carmichael, Mississippi. About 10,253 barrels (430,626 gallons) of propane were released. The resulting propane cloud expanded over nearby homes and ignited, creating a large fireball that was seen from miles away. As a result of the ensuing fire, two people were killed, and seven people sustained minor injuries. Four houses were destroyed, and several others were damaged. Electric resistance welding pipe failure was suspect as the cause of the rupture.

On July 5, 2010, a landowner hit the pipeline with a bulldozer, rupturing it, in McDuffie County, Georgia. The escaping propane ignited 16 minutes later, killing one person and injuring another, and destroyed a mobile home.
