= David N. Weidman =

American chemical industry executive

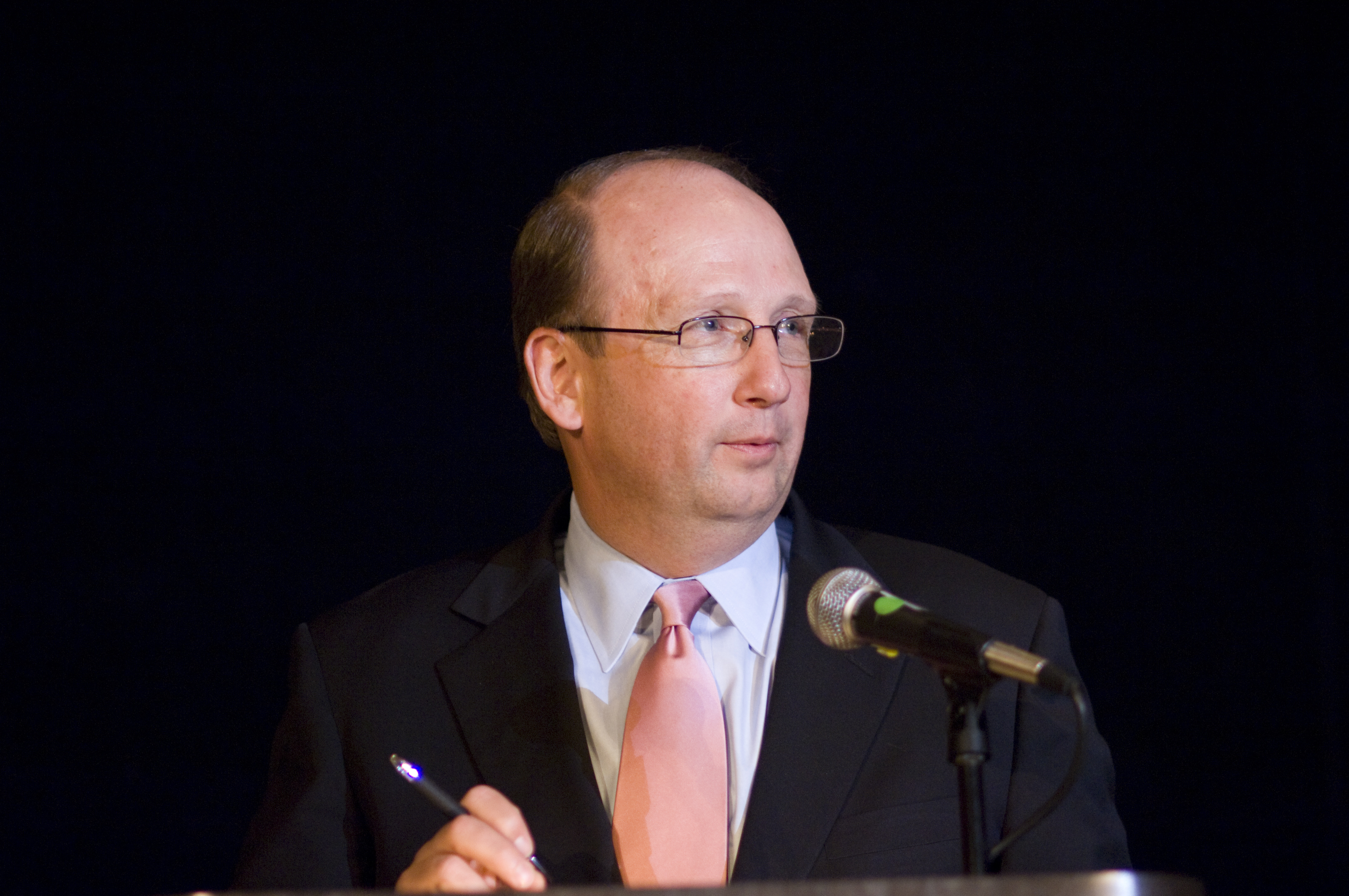
- Born: May 23, 1955 (age 71)
- Education: University of Michigan
- Awards: Chemical Industry Medal (2012) Petrochemical Heritage Award 2017
- Scientific career
- Fields: Chemistry
- Workplaces: Celanese Corporation

David N. Weidman (born May 23, 1955) was Chief Executive Officer and a member of the board of directors of Celanese Corporation from December 2004 to April 2012, when he retired. He received the Chemical Industry Medal from the Society of Chemical Industry in 2012, and the Petrochemical Heritage Award in 2017.

== Early life and education ==
Weidman was born May 23, 1955 to Byron Orme and Olive Nelson Weidman in Tremonton, Utah. Weidman was a finalist in the Westinghouse Science Talent Search in 1973, a highly prestigious science competition for high school seniors. He graduated with a bachelor's degree in Chemical engineering from Brigham Young University (BYU) in 1978. He graduated with an MBA from the University of Michigan's Ross School of Business in 1980.

== Career ==
External videos
- “David Weidman, CEO Celanese”, BYU Weidman Center Leadership Lecture Series, Brigham Young University

Weidman began his career in the chemical industry with American Cyanamid in 1980. He rose to the position of vice president at GM Cyanamid Canada (1989-1990) and in the GM Fibers Division (1990-1994).

Weidman joined AlliedSignal in 1994, holding various positions, including president and general manager of fluorine products (1995-199) and president of its performance polymers business (1998-1999). When Allied Signal was acquired by Honeywell, Weidman became Honeywell President of Performance Polymers Business (1999-2000).

Weidman joined Celanese AG (Celanese's predecessor) in September 2000, where he held a number of executive positions. In 2002, he became chief operating officer. In December 2004, after the company moved from Germany to the United States, he became chief executive officer and a member of the board of directors of Celanese Corporation. In January 2005, the company held its first public offering. Weidman was instrumental in the company's transformation from a German-based company (trading on the Frankfurt Stock Exchange) to a global company (trading on the New York Stock Exchange.) Weidman was elected to the position of chairman of the board of directors in February 2007. He retired in April 2012.

Weidman is a past chairman of the board of the Society of Chemical Industry and of the American Chemistry Council (2009).

Weidman is a member of the board of the National Advisory Council of the Marriott School of Business at BYU. He is a member of the Advancement Counsel for Engineering and Technology for the Ira A. Fulton College of Engineering and Technology at BYU. Weidman is a member of the board of The Conservation Fund. He is a board member of The Vanishing Cultures Project.

== Philanthropy ==
Weidman and his wife, Rachel Nielsen Weidman, have served on the President's Leadership Council at BYU since 2009. The couple donated $10 million towards the establishment of the Weidman Center for Global Leadership in the Ira A. Fulton College of Engineering and Technology at BYU in 2011.

== Religion ==
In 2013, David and Rachel Weidman were appointed as mission leaders for the Church of Jesus Christ of Latter-day Saints in the California Los Angeles Mission. After returning from California, they served at the church's Provo Missionary Training Center. Weidman was then appointed as the director of missionary effectiveness in the church's Missionary Department.
