= Texas Monthly =

American magazine published in Texas

- Cover of the January 2007 issue, covering the Dick Cheney hunting incident
- Editor-in-chief: Ross McCammon
- Frequency: Monthly
- Total circulation: 252,469 (2023)
- First issue: February 1973; 53 years ago
- Company: Texas Monthly LLC (Randa Williams)
- Country: United States
- Based in: Austin, Texas
- Website: www.texasmonthly.com
- ISSN: 0148-7736
- OCLC: 222820656

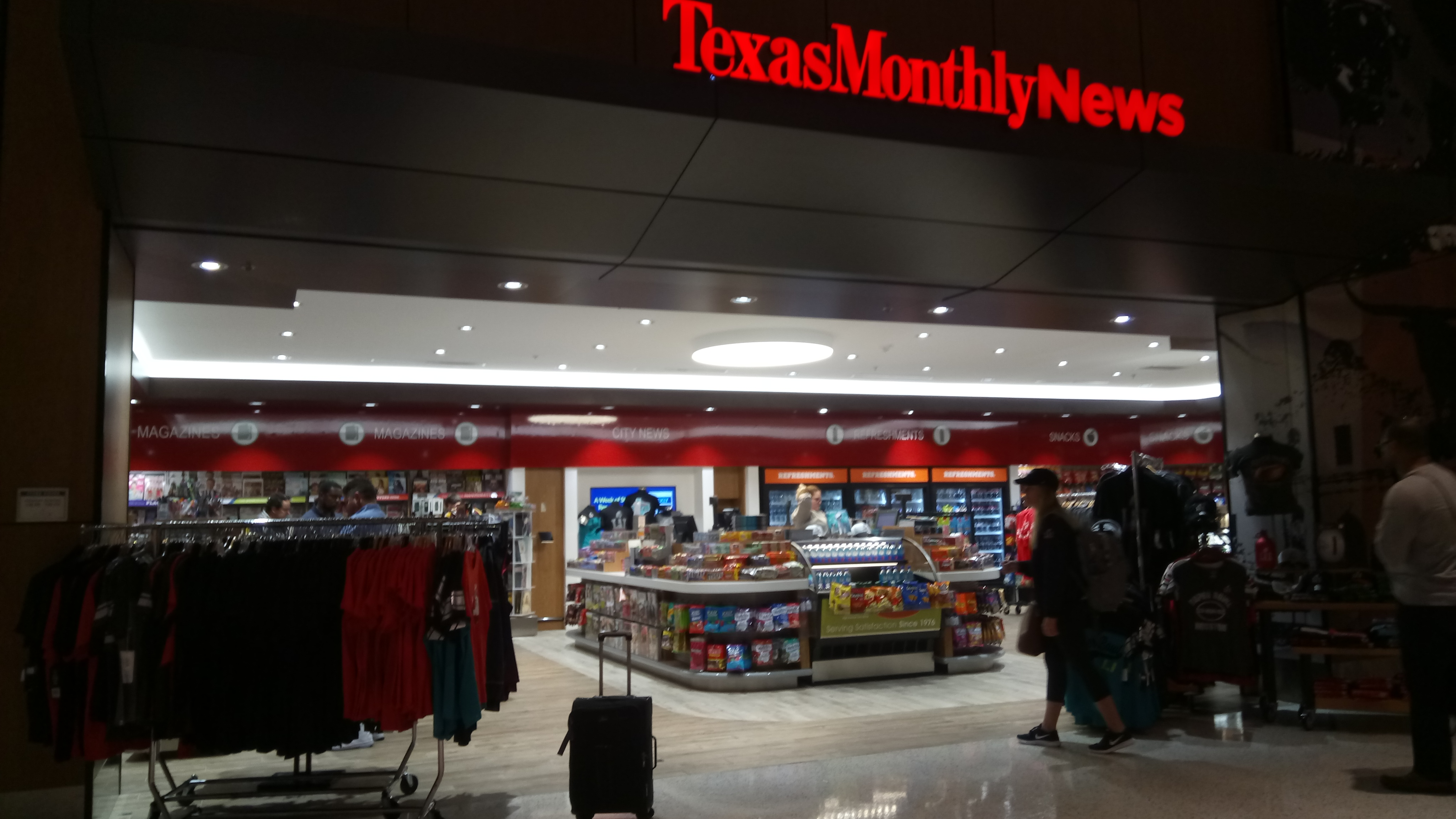
Texas Monthly News shop at George Bush Intercontinental Airport in Houston

Texas Monthly (stylized as TexasMonthly) is a monthly American magazine headquartered in Austin, Texas, United States. Founded in 1973 by Michael R. Levy, Texas Monthly chronicles life in contemporary Texas, writing on politics, the environment, industry, and education. The magazine also covers leisure topics such as music, art, dining, and travel. It is a member of the City and Regional Magazine Association (CRMA).

After being sold to Emmis Publishing, L.P. in 1998, the magazine was later sold to Genesis Park LP in 2016 for $25 million, and is currently owned by Randa Williams as of 2019. In 2021, Texas Monthly began expanding into video production through its acquisition of Phillips Productions, best known as the producers of Texas Country Reporter.

== Subject matter ==
Texas Monthly assumes that Texas has always been, and still is, a distinctive place. It has made itself the arbiter of all things culturally Texan, publishing articles on Texas barbecue, the Texas Rangers (including Joaquin Jackson's famous 1994 cover appearance), and Texas musicians.

Texas Monthly's annual "Bum Steer Awards" poke fun at Texas politicians and policies, odd Texas-related news items and personalities from the previous year. Anna Nicole Smith (prior to her death) was a perennial "winner". Other Bum Steer "Hall of Famers" include Ross Perot, Tom DeLay, and Jessica Simpson. It releases biennial lists with explanations of the "Ten Best" and "Ten Worst" Texas state legislators.

Since the establishment of the magazine, barbecue enthusiasts have been among the Texas Monthly staff. The magazine's first article about barbecue in Texas was published in 1973. The magazine often ranks what it considers to be the best barbecue restaurants in Texas. Calvin Trillin of The New Yorker said in 2008 that East Texas barbecue often did not interest the Austin-based staff of the Texas Monthly, who were more focused on Central Texas barbecue. Texas Monthly's rankings are considered authoritative and their release is an annual event in Texas barbecue.

In December 2021, the magazine signed a three-year first-look deal with HBO and HBO Max.

== Awards ==
In February 2026, Texas Monthly contributor Elliott Woods won the 2025 George Polk Award for Magazine Reporting for a two-part series that explored a 2022 immigration-related disaster that left 53 migrants dead in San Antonio. Later that year, in May 2026, senior editor Aaron Parsley won Texas Monthly its first Pulitzer Prize. Parsley's award-winning entry, a first-person account of his family's experience and loss during the July 2025 Central Texas floods, won in the feature writing category.

The magazine has also received fourteen National Magazine Awards:

- General Excellence—2009, 2003, 1992, 1990
- Leisure Interests—2018, for "The Golden Age of BBQ" by Daniel Vaughn and Patricia Sharpe
- Feature Writing Incorporating Profile Writing—2013, for "The Innocent Man" (part 1 and 2) by Pamela Colloff
- Feature Writing—2010, for "Still Life" by Skip Hollandsworth
- Public Interest—1996 and 2013, for "Not What the Doctor Ordered" and "Mothers, Sisters, Daughters, Wives" both by Mimi Swartz
- Photography—1990
- Reporting—1985, for "The Man in the Black Hat" (part 1 and 2) by Paul Burka
- Public Service—1980, for "Why Teachers Can't Teach" by Gene Lyons
- Reporting—1979, for a three-part series by Richard West
- Outstanding Editorial Achievement in Special Journalism—1974

== Archives ==
The complete archives of Texas Monthly (1972–present) are located at the Wittliff collections of Southwestern Writers, Texas State University.
