= John Hall (American businessman) =

American businessman (1932–2021)

John R. Hall
- Born: John R. Hall; November 30, 1932; Dallas, Texas, U.S.
- Died: November 25, 2021 (aged 88); Lexington, Kentucky, U.S.
- Education: Vanderbilt University
- Occupation: Businessman
- Title: Chairman and CEO, Ashland Oil
- Term: 1981–97
- Predecessor: Orin E. Atkins
- Board member of: American Petroleum Institute; Arch Coal; Canada Life; Commonwealth Fund; Kentucky Educational Television; The Conference Board; Conservancy of Southwest Florida; Corporate Fund of the John F. Kennedy Center for the Performing Arts; CSX Corp. Everglades Foundation's Chairman's Advisory Council; Federal Reserve Bank of Cleveland; GrafTech; Humana Inc. JPMorgan Chase (Bank One); Kentucky Historical Society Foundation; Reynolds Metals; Transylvania University; USEC Inc. Vanderbilt University
- Spouse(s): Ann McQuiddy Hall (1955-1972) (deceased); Donna S. Hall (1980-present)
- Children: One son

John Richard Hall (November 30, 1932 – November 25, 2021) was an American businessman, and the chairman and CEO of Ashland Oil Inc. from 1981 to 1997.

== Early life and education ==
Hall was born in Dallas, Texas, the son of John "Big John" Hall and Agnes Sanders Hall. He has one brother, James E. Hall, former Chairman of the National Transportation Safety Board.

By 1935, the family had returned to Tennessee, eventually settling in Knoxville, where the young John attended public schools. He graduated Knoxville High School in 1951. A strong football player, he earned scholarship offers from both Vanderbilt University and the University of Tennessee, among other institutions. He chose Vanderbilt, from which his father had graduated. By his senior year he was co-captain of the football team. He earned a degree in chemical engineering from Vanderbilt in 1955.

Hall was the first Vanderbilt player ever named an Academic All-American and graduated magna cum laude with a degree in chemical engineering in 1955. He was also inducted into the Tau Beta Pi Engineering Honor Society and the Omicron Delta Kappa national leadership honor society.

== Career ==
After graduating from Vanderbilt, where he had participated in the Reserve Officer Training Corps, Hall served as a second lieutenant in the U.S. Army. Hall had joined Eastern States Standard Oil (Esso, now Exxon) as a chemical engineer in 1955. In 1957, he accepted a position with Ashland as assistant to the coordinator of research and development.

Hall became executive assistant to company Founder and Chairman Paul Blazer in 1965. By 1966, Hall had risen to general refinery superintendent, and later that year, at 33, he was elected the company's youngest-ever vice president. Two years later, he was elected to Ashland Oil's board of directors. By 1971, the company had moved into specialty chemicals production and chemical distribution, and Hall was named president of the Ashland Chemical Company. He was elected executive vice president of Ashland Oil, Inc. in 1974, vice chairman of the board and chief operating office in 1979, and chairman and chief executive officer in September, 1981.

By that time, Ashland had developed a diverse business portfolio which included petroleum refining and marketing; chemicals; crude oil exploration and production; coal mining; road construction, heavy equipment manufacturing, and insurance marketing. Most of that portfolio was related to Ashland's core refining and marketing business. Seeking other revenue streams, Hall's predecessor, Orin E. Atkins, had led the company to acquire U.S. Filter Corporation (heavy manufacturing) and Integon Insurance in 1980. The strategy had not worked: The acquisitions were too far afield from the company's knowledge base and expertise, and the U.S. economy entered a downturn that hurt both the insurance and heavy equipment industries. By 1984 it was clear that action was needed, so Hall introduced a new strategy focusing on core businesses and moved to divest both U.S. Filter and Integon. The divestiture resulted in a one-time, $270 million after-tax loss for the company in fiscal year 1984. But analysts praised Hall's back-to-basics strategy, and The Gallagher Report named Hall one of its 10 best corporate chief executives for 1985. His strategic gamble paid off: Ashland earned $146.7 million in net income for 1985.

Between 1985 and his retirement in 1996, Hall steered Ashland on a steady course designed to stabilize earnings from refining and marketing, increase profits from related, non-refining businesses and maintain a strong financial position. During Hall's tenure, sales and revenue at Ashland Chemical nearly tripled and it became the largest distributor of chemicals and plastics in North America; SuperAmerica, Ashland's gasoline marketing division, went from 158 stores to more than 600; highway construction operations under APAC, the company's road construction business, almost doubled; and Ashland shares returned 10.5 percent value annually.

On December 22, 1999, John B. McCoy retired from the chairmanship of BankOne. Hall, by then retired from Ashland, was named acting Chairman and Chairman of the Search Committee to replace McCoy. Within a few months, the search committee recommended to the board that Jamie Dimon be hired as BankOne's new chairman and CEO. The Board approved the recommendation unanimously.

== Crisis management ==
Hall also guided Ashland through several major crises. In 1983 the Securities and Exchange Commission announced an investigation into questionable payments related to crude oil purchases from Oman made prior to Hall's election as chairman. Ashland's board previously had retained a Pittsburgh law firm to look into the matter, and its report and recommendations, which concluded that no U.S. laws had been broken and that Ashland was not legally required to disclose the report, were presented to the board in October 1981. The findings addressed internal control issues, and the company implemented all recommendations prior to the SEC inquiry. At the conclusion of its investigation in July 1986, however, the SEC sought an injunction against Ashland and its former chairman, Orin E. Atkins, and alleged that one transaction between 1979 and 1981 violated the U.S. Foreign Corrupt Practices Act; Ashland and the commission reached an agreement wherein the SEC declined to pursue the charges in exchange for Ashland, which did not admit to the allegations, agreeing not to use money to influence foreign officials in the future. With Hall at the helm, Ashland had cooperated fully with the SEC inquiry. Moreover, to ward off potential future violations, Hall had ordered the development of both a Code of Business Conduct and a preventive law program very soon after he became chairman.

Two years later, Ashland faced an existential threat when the Belzberg family of Canada initiated a hostile takeover. Hall and his team called on the assistance of investment bankers, inside and outside legal counsel and Kentucky lawmakers who just happened to be in session. The company beat the Belzbergs to the news media, and the Kentucky legislature, eager to help the state's largest corporation, enacted an anti-takeover law in a matter of days. The company defeated the takeover attempt in a little over a week. Hall's blueprint also included a tactic to discourage future takeover attempts: The company developed an employee stock ownership plan in which about $300 million in excess pension assets was converted to Ashland shares and allocated to employees over a 10-year period. Thus, employees became the largest shareholder group.

Hall's skills at crisis management gained national attention in early 1988 as the result of an incident which came to be known in crisis management circles as "the trouble at Floreffe." On January 2, 1988, a 4-million-gallon storage tank at Ashland's Floreffe, Pa., collapsed, sending diesel fuel gushing over the sides of the surrounding containment dike in waves. The fluid found its way to an open storm sewer drain on adjacent property, and 750,000 gallons of diesel oil poured into the Monongahela River and eventually flowed into the Ohio River, disrupting drinking water in four states. The spill threatened the drinking water of roughly 1 million people in 80 communities in three states. Ashland quickly notified authorities so that containment could commence as soon as possible.

It became clear that the tank was not new but reconstructed of used, 40-year-old steel, that an alternative testing method had been used to confirm its storage worthiness, and that the construction permit had been applied for but received only verbal permission.

Hall went to Pittsburgh, inspected the site of the collapse and discovered that the tank was not up to company standards. He gave a news conference apologizing for the incident, taking responsibility, and promising that Ashland would pay for all cleanup costs and reimburse communities for expenses incurred because of water shortages. "We’re doing everything we know how to to clean up the danger as quickly as possible and restore water supplies," he said. "Ashland is a responsible corporate citizen that is also responsible to community concerns in the areas where our terminals are located." Hall drew praise for being so forthright and direct in confronting the crisis.

Ashland quickly opened a Pittsburgh office to handle claims and staffed it with a senior executive. Hall went there regularly along with other senior executives to keep communication channels open. The company provided affected communities with drinking water for weeks, and commissioned the Battelle Memorial Institute of Columbus, Ohio, and ERT, an environmental consulting firm, to examine the long-term environmental impact of the spill. Battelle also was engaged to conduct an independent investigation into the collapse. Battelle's analysis determined the tank failure was caused by a brittle steel fracture – the original steel predated World War II – emanating from a dime-size flaw in the metal near a weld in the bottom round of the tank. Combined with other factors, including the cold temperatures, the flaw caused the tank wall to split in less than a second. In November 1989 Ashland agreed to pay $30 million to settle 20 class-action civil suits filed as a result of the spill. Overall, the spill and its aftermath cost Ashland an estimated $40 million, including $30 million to settle class-action civil lawsuits.

But Hall's deft handling of the crisis won praise from financial analysts just days after the spill and from other observers as time went on. He would be named Crisis Manager of the Year by Carnegie Mellon University for his handling of the spill's aftermath. Hall's approach to the crisis became the subject of a Harvard Business School case study and today remains a textbook example of effective crisis management.

== Personal life ==
Hall married his college sweetheart, Ann McQuiddy, in the fall of 1955, shortly after he graduated from Vanderbilt. The two moved to Baltimore where he accepted a job with Esso. Ann Hall developed a serious health problem, which led Hall to accept a position at Ashland Oil to be closer to family for support during the health crisis. John and Ann Hall adopted a son, John, known as "Jay," in 1971. Ann's health, however, continued to deteriorate, and she died of cancer in 1972 at the age of 40.

Hall met his second wife, the former Donna Stauffer, in the late 1970s through mutual friends in Chicago, and they married in 1980. In 1998, shortly after his retirement, they were dealt an unexpected blow when Mrs. Hall developed breast cancer. She underwent successful treatment, and the two again immersed themselves in civic and charitable work.

== Business and civic involvement ==
Hall was very active in industry organizations while an executive at Ashland. He is a past chairman of the National Petroleum Refiners Association (now known as American Fuel & Petrochemical Manufacturers) and remains an honorary director of the American Petroleum Institute. He was also a member of the National Petroleum Council.

Hall has served as a director of GrafTech International Ltd.; CSX Corp.; LaRoche Industries Inc.; Reynolds Metals Company; Humana Inc.; Canada Life; JP Morgan (Bank One Corporation;) Arch Coal, Inc.; and USEC Inc. He served as the first chairman of Arch Coal Company and retired from that position in December 1998. He served as chairman of the board of Bank One Corporation (now part of JP Morgan) for several months during a management transition. Hall chaired both the Blue Grass Community Foundation and the Commonwealth Fund for Kentucky Educational Television. He was chairman of Board of Trustees at Vanderbilt University and served on the Engineering School Committee of Visitors. He is a former member of the Board of Trustees at Transylvania University and served as chairman of the Fund for Transylvania; the school also has a softball field named for Hall and his wife, Donna. He is a former member of the board of directors of the Federal Reserve Bank of Cleveland. He is past chairman of the Commonwealth Fund for Kentucky Educational Television (KET), and Leadership Kentucky, past president of the Kentucky Historical Society Foundation, and past president of the Markey Cancer Center Foundation and still serves on this board. In 2010, he was inducted into the Kentucky Historical Society Foundation's Abraham Lincoln Society. He is past chairman and counselor-for-life of The Conference Board and a former member of the board of directors of New American Schools Development Corporation. Hall served as Kentucky state chairman for the United States Olympic Committee from 1991 to 1996 and as chairman of the Corporate Fund for the John F. Kennedy Center for the Performing Arts in Washington, D.C. from 1996 to 1997. He is on the board of directors of the Conservancy of Southwest Florida and is on the Chairman's Advisory Council of the Everglades Foundation.

He also endowed a chair in breast cancer research in his wife's name, the Donna S. Hall Chair in Breast Cancer Research, at the Vanderbilt-Ingram Cancer Center. Hall was deeply involved in education improvement efforts spearheaded by the national Business Roundtable, of which he was a member. Under the aegis of the BRT, he co-founded The Partnership for Kentucky School Reform, which rallied corporate support for changes in primary education. He also led the West Virginia Business and Education Alliance, the BRT initiative in the Mountain State.

Under Hall's leadership, Ashland devoted its entire corporate advertising budget to the cause of education with a goal of improving public schools in Kentucky and West Virginia. Hall also served on the board of the Society of Yeager Scholars at Marshall University and as national chairman of the Campaign for Marshall University.

== Recognition ==
Hall has received numerous awards. These plaudits date from 1983 when he received the Distinguished Alumnus Award from Vanderbilt University. In 1985, he received the Tennessee Technology Foundation Honor Award. Petroleum Management magazine named him one of the 10 most influential individuals in the oil and gas industry in 1985. He also received a Significant Sig award from Sigma Chi fraternity in 1985. The following year, The Ohio State University bestowed him with the College of Engineering award for business and technological achievement. The American Institute of Chemical Engineers honored him in 1987 with the Fuels and Petrochemical Division Award for management of petroleum operations. In 1988, the year of the Pittsburgh oil spill, he was named Crisis Manager of the Year by Carnegie Mellon University. He received an honorary Doctor of Laws degree from Eastern Kentucky University in 1990 and became a member of the advisory board of The Oil Daily that year. He earned honorary membership in the Kentucky Association of School Administrators in 1990 and became a trustee of the Committee for Economic Development, a national non-profit organization in 1991. He and his wife, Donna, were honored as Outstanding Volunteer Fund-Raisers in 1993 by the Lexington, Ky., Chapter of the National Society of Fund-Raising Executives. Octane Week magazine chose him as Executive of the Year in 1994. He was inducted into the Marshall University Business Hall of Fame in 1995 and was chosen to serve on the Kentucky Governor's Special Advisory Committee on Education in 1996. In 1999, Hall received the Petrochemical Heritage Award.

He was elected to the Academic All-America Hall of Fame in 2001. In 2004 he received Leadership Kentucky's Flame of Excellence Award. In 2007, the Kentucky Legislature awarded Hall the Vic Hellard Jr. Award. Also in 2007, ODX honored him with an Outstanding Director award. He was chosen for Vanderbilt's Inaugural Athletics Hall of Fame class in 2008. In 2009 the Happy Chandler Scholarship Foundation presented Hall with its Kentuckian Award for outstanding services to the commonwealth. In 2010 he was named to the Tennessee Sports Hall of Fame as a Lifetime Achievement Inductee. Kentucky Educational Television honored him on National Philanthropy Day in 2013. He received the W.T. Young Lifetime Achievement Award in 2015 from Commerce Lexington, and in 2016 KET produced a documentary about John Hall's life, entitled "The Kentucky Commodore." He was the recipient of the Eagle Award from the Conservancy of Southwest Florida in 2017 – the highest award given annually for philanthropy.

Hall's commitment to corporate citizenship brought honors to his company as well. In 1988, Ashland was named Business Citizen of the Year by the University of Kentucky chapter of Beta Gamma Sigma in recognition of Ashland's support for education, a trademark of Hall's leadership. That year Ashland also received the President's Citation for Private Sector Initiatives for the company's dropout prevention efforts. The National Education Association recognized Ashland twice for the Advancement of Learning through Broadcasting. The State of Minnesota designated Ashland as a Friend of Education in 1993. The U.S. Department of the Interior recognized Ashland in 1993 for starting the Ohio River Sweep, an annual riverbank clean-up program begun under Hall's leadership that continues to the present.

He has received honorary degrees from a number of institutions, including Centre College, Kentucky State University, Marshall University, Morehead State University, Northern Kentucky University, Pikeville College, Transylvania University, the University of Eastern Kentucky, the University of Kentucky, and the University of Louisville.
