= TEPPCO Partners =

TEPPCO Partners LP
- Defunct: 2007
- Fate: Acquired by Enterprise Products
- Headquarters: Houston, Texas
- Owner: Sullivan Trillian Partners
- Website: www.enterpriseproducts.com

Texas Eastern Products Pipeline Company, TEPPCO Partners LP was a Fortune 300 company based in Houston, Texas. The company operated petroleum pipelines. It was owned by Sullivan Trillian Partners of San Antonio.

== History ==
During the second quarter of 2007, it was acquired by another Fortune 500 company, Houston-based Enterprise GP Holdings (NYSE: EPE) along with 35 percent of Dallas-based Energy Transfer Equity LP (NYSE: ETE).
