= Westlake Corporation =

American petrochemical company

- Formerly: Westlake Chemical Corporation
- Type: Public
- Traded as: NYSE: WLK; S&P 400 component
- Industry: Chemicals; Petrochemicals
- Founded: 1986; 40 years ago
- Founder: Ting Tsung Chao
- Headquarters: Houston, Texas, U.S.
- Key people: Albert Chao (chairman); Jean-Marc Gilson (CEO)
- Revenue: ▼US$12.1 billion (2024)
- Operating income: ▲US$875 million (2024)
- Net income: ▲US$602 million (2024)
- Total assets: ▼US$20.8 billion (2024)
- Total equity: ▲US$10.5 billion (2024)
- Number of employees: 15,540 (2024)
- Website: westlake.com

Westlake Corporation is an international manufacturer and supplier of petrochemicals, polymers and fabricated building products, which are fundamental to various consumer and industrial markets. The company was founded by Ting Tsung Chao in 1986. it is the largest producer of low-density polyethylene (LDPE) in the US and ranks among the Forbes Global 2000. Westlake Chemical operates in two segments: Olefins and Vinyls, and is also an integrated producer of vinyls, with substantial downstream integration into polyvinyl chloride (PVC) building products.

In 2026, it was ranked 388th among Houston-area Fortune 500 companies in the Greater Houston area.

== Facilities ==
In 2014, Westlake made a significant expansion in their ethylene production facilities in Sulphur, Louisiana. In the same year, Westlake acquired the German polyvinyl chloride manufacturer Vinnolit.

In 2016, Westlake acquired U.S. chlor-alkali producer Axiall Corporation for US$3.8 billion.

In June 2021, Westlake purchased the United States building products business of Boral for $2.2 billion. In 2022, Westlake took over Hexion's epoxy division.

== Safety Incidents ==
In September 2021, an explosion at a Westlake ethylene plant in Sulphur, Louisiana injured six workers. In January 2022, an ethylene dichloride tank exploded at a Westlake facility in Westlake, Louisiana injuring 6 workers and triggering a shelter-in-place order.

Westlake facilities in Louisiana have had uncontrolled chemical releases including benzene, chloroform, ethylene dichloride, hydrogen chloride and vinyl chloride.

Westlake's operations in Calvert City, Kentucky, have faced scrutiny from regulators. In 2024, the U.S. Environmental Protection Agency (EPA) announced findings from a long-term air monitoring study in the surrounding community, and determined emissions of ethylene dichloride were driving elevated cancer risk. Westlake's Calvert City operations are the main source of ethylene dichloride emissions in the area, according to the EPA.
