= Gary K. Adams =

American businessman

Gary K. Adams, 2018
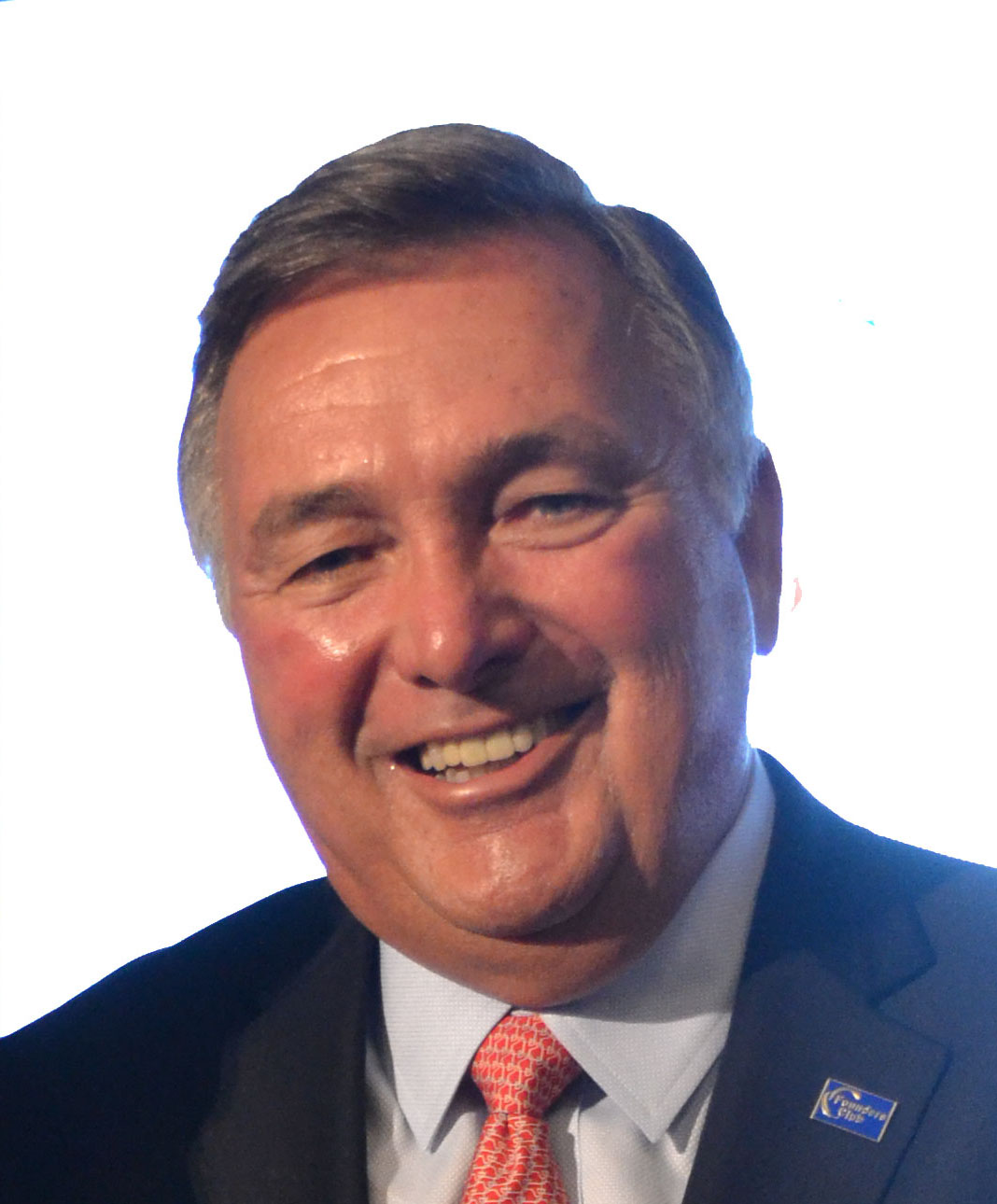
- Born: Gary Kramer Adams
- Education: Bachelor of Science in Industrial Management - University of Arkansas
- Known for: former president and CEO of Chemical Market Associates Inc
- Awards: Petrochemical Heritage Award
- Scientific career
- Workplaces: Chemical Market Associates

Gary K. Adams is the former president and CEO of Chemical Market Associates Inc. (CMAI, 1997–2011) and chief chemical advisor for its successor IHS Markit (2011–2017). He serves on the board of directors of Phillips 66, and Trecora Resources. He has been a board member of Westlake Chemical Partners (2014–2016) and Phillips 66 Partners LP (2013–2016)

== Education ==
Gary Kramer Adams earned a Bachelor of Science in Industrial Management at the University of Arkansas.

== Career ==
Adams worked at Union Carbide as a head of purchasing and distribution, from 1975 to 1990. He then joined Chemical Market Associates Inc. (CMAI) as director of the Monomers Market Advisory Service. He served progressively as president, CEO and chairman of the Board of CMAI from 1997 until 2011, when CMAI was acquired by IHS (now IHSMarkit). He served as IHS Markit's chief chemical advisor from 2011 – April 1, 2017.

Adams' work has tended to focus on global sourcing and transportation issues relating to hydrocarbon-based products. Adams became a board member of the Arabian American Development Company (which later became Trecora Resources) as of 2012. He became a board member of Phillips 66 Partners as of October 2, 2013. He was a founding board member of Westlake Chemical Partners (2014–2016) He became a board member of Phillips 66 in 2016.

== Awards ==
- 2018, Petrochemical Heritage Award
