= Milane Frantz =

American billionaire heir

Milane Duncan Frantz
- Born: Milane Diane Duncan; 1970 (age 55–56)
- Education: University of Houston
- Spouse: Matthew J. Frantz (m. 2001; died 2014)
- Parents: Dan Duncan (father); Barbara Ann Duncan (mother)

Milane Diane Frantz (née Duncan, born 1970) is a billionaire heir to the Duncan family fortune through Enterprise Products, which remains under family control.

== Early life ==
Milane Frantz was born in 1970 to Barbara Ann and Dan Duncan. Her father, Dan Duncan, was the co-founder of Enterprise Products.

== Career ==
Frantz is an investor. She inherited $3.1B upon the death of her father. Due to a temporary repeal in the estate tax law for the year 2010, Duncan's children became the first American billionaires to pay no estate tax since its enactment. Frantz's net worth is $4.3 billion, as of April 2020.

== Personal life ==
On July 28, 2001, she married Matthew J. Frantz, the son of Philip and Judy (Erhardt) Frantz. He died on September 4, 2014, aged 45. She lives in Houston, Texas.
