= Ting Tsung Chao =

Asian-American plastics entrepreneur

- Born: 1921; Suzhou, Jiangsu, Republic of China
- Died: March 7, 2008 (aged 86)
- Occupation: Businessman
- Known for: Petrochemical and plastics industry
- Spouse: Wei Fong Chao
- Children: Dorothy Chao Jenkins, James Y. Chao, Albert Chao

Chinese name
- Traditional Chinese: 趙廷箴
- Hanyu Pinyin: Zhào Tíngzhēn

Ting Tsung "T.T." Chao (1921 – March 7, 2008) was a Taiwanese-American engineer. He was a pioneer in international petrochemical and plastics industries in Asia and North America.

== History ==
Chao was born in Suzhou, Jiangsu, China. Chao graduated from Shanghai University with a degree in Industrial Management and began a career in the railroad industry. After the Second World War Chao relocated to Taiwan and created the first polyvinyl chloride (PVC) plant. The plant began production in 1957 and assisted in Taiwan's economic development.

In 1964, Chao formed The Chao Group, a privately held petrochemical and plastics manufacturing conglomerate which worked with various multinational corporations including Gulf Oil Corporation, Mobil Oil Corporation, Sumitomo Corporation and others. Chao's joint venture with Mattel in 1966 produced the first Barbie dolls. Chao later formed Westlake Chemical Corporation in 1986 in Texas, Titans Chemical Corporation in 1988, which was the first and largest petrochemical company in Malaysia, and Suzhou Huasu Plastics Co. Ltd in 1992. His son, James Y. Chao, is currently chairman of Westlake Chemical. His second son, Albert Chao, is president and CEO.

In 2005, Chao received the Petrochemical Heritage Award. Chao was inducted into the Plastics Hall of Fame in 2011.

== Family ==
As of 2015, his family was ranked 39th in America's richest families with an estimated net worth of $7.2 billion. The family was ranked 4th richest family in Texas.
