= Enterprise Products =

American fuel company

Enterprise Products Partners L.P.
- Type: Public
- Traded as: NYSE: EPD
- Industry: Oil and gas
- Founded: 1968
- Headquarters: Enterprise Plaza; Houston, Texas, US
- Key people: W. Randall Fowler (co-CEO); A.J. Teague (co-CEO)
- Products: Crude oil, refined products and certain petrochemicals.
- Services: Oil and gas transportation
- Revenue: ▲US$40.806 billion (2021)
- Operating income: ▲US$6.103 billion (2021)
- Net income: ▲US$4.755 billion (2021)
- Total assets: ▲US$67.525 billion (2021)
- Total equity: ▲US$26.438 billion (2021)
- Owner: Duncan family
- Number of employees: 7,000
- Subsidiaries: Dixie Pipeline
- Website: www.enterpriseproducts.com

Enterprise Products Partners L.P. (NYSE: EPD) is an American midstream natural gas and crude oil pipeline company with headquarters in Houston, Texas. They acquired GulfTerra in September 2004. The company ranked No. 89 in the 2026 Fortune 500 list of the largest United States corporations by total revenue. Dan Duncan was the majority owner until his death in 2010, when his heirs, including his widow and children inherited his stake.

== History ==
In 2005, Ralph S. Cunningham became CEO of Enterprise Products Partners.

On July 23, 2007, Cunningham replaced Michael A. Creel as president and CEO of the affiliated Enterprise GP Holdings LP (NYSE: EPE). Cunningham had earlier been named interim president and CEO, and resigned from the Enterprise Products CEO position effective July 31, 2007. Creel then became president and CEO of the company's general partner Enterprise Products Partners L.P.

Cunningham also became a director of both Enterprise GP Holdings and affiliated Duncan Energy Partners LP (NYSE: EPL).

Enterprise Products acquired Enterprise GP Holdings in 2010.

A. J. Teague was appointed CEO in 2016 and in 2020 W. Randall Fowler was appointed as joint CEO. A.J. Teague's retirement date is scheduled for January 4, 2027.

== Incidents ==
On June 7, 2005, during replacement of an Enterprise Products pipeline pigging facility in Mirando City, Texas, HVL gases leaked past a stopple. The gases were ignited by a nearby air compressor, killing one of the repair crew.

On February 8, 2011, a series of explosions destroyed much of a Mont Belvieu facility owned and operated by Enterprise Products. The ensuing fire was controlled after two hours. One contractor at the plant was not accounted for, however no other injuries were reported.

On December 27, 2011, controllers for Enterprise Products received an alarm, for a leak on an LPG pipeline. The leak location was found in Loving County, Texas. Repair crew excavated the area, and found a full girth weld failure. During the pipeline repair, a flash fire involving residual pipeline product in the soil occurred the next day, injuring 3 employees, one of whom required in-patient hospitalization. The rupture was attributed to the complete circumferential separation of an acetylene girth weld dating to 1928, and the flash fire was attributed to operator error.

On January 26, 2015, a 20-inch Enterprise Products ATEX pipeline carrying ethane exploded and burned in Brooke County, West Virginia. Despite snow in the area, five acres of woodlands burned, and 1,283,000 gallons of ethane were consumed, or lost. The fireball melted siding on nearby homes and damaged power lines; it is believed that day's snowy weather lessened the damage. Reports suspect a girth weld failure from ductile tensile overload, with the pipeline being less than two years old. There were no injuries.

On December 1, 2015, personnel from Enterprise discovered a spill at their West Cushing Tank Farm, in Cushing, Oklahoma. Approximately 42,000 gallons of crude oil were released within the terminal. A tank line had failed from internal corrosion.

On November 29, 2016, an Enterprise Products pipeline exploded in Platte County, Missouri, burning about 210,000 gallons of an ethane propane mixture. There were no evacuations or injuries. The cause of the failure was stress corrosion cracking.

On January 30, 2017, a road crew punctured the Seaway S-1 crude oil pipeline in Texas, which is jointly joined by Enterprise Products Partners and the Canadian Enbridge Inc. through the joint venture Seaway Crude Pipeline Company. Two days later, it was unclear how much oil had spilled over the nearby Highway 121 northeast of Dallas. After the incident, supply concerns reportedly helped push "oil prices 2% higher in early trading to nearly $54 a barrel.

On December 6, 2017, an Enterprise Products pipeline exploded around 1:30 am near Loving, in southeast New Mexico. Eddy County officials asked residents within a 2-mile radius of the intersection of U.S. Highway 285 and State Road 31 to voluntarily evacuate.

On August 21, 2020, a dredging vessel hit a submerged Enterprise Products propane pipeline, in the harbor of Corpus Christi, Texas, causing an explosion and fire. Five of the crew were killed, and, six others were injured.

On December 5, 2024, private wells near Durango, Colorado were flooded with 12 feet of gasoline after 23,000 gallons leaked from a broken Enterprise Products pipeline. The spill is atop Florida Mesa, hundreds of feet above the Animas River. Detectors are now finding benzene seepage in intermittent springbeds running down the hillsides toward the river.

== Assets ==
According to the company website and their regulatory fillings, it has the following assets:

=== Pipelines ===
51,000 miles (82,000 km) of pipelines, including:

- NGL Pipelines & Services: 19,400 miles (31,200 km) of natural gas liquids pipelines
- Onshore Natural Gas Pipelines & Services: 19,600 miles (31,500 km) of natural gas pipelines
- Onshore Crude Oil Pipelines & Services: 4,600 miles (7,400 km) of onshore crude oil pipelines
- Offshore Pipelines & Services: 2,300 miles (3,700 km) of Gulf of Mexico natural gas and crude oil pipelines
- Propylene Pipelines: 985 miles (1,585 km) of propylene pipelines in Texas and Louisiana.

=== Storage (salt dome) ===
- 177 million barrels (28.1 million cubic metres) of NGL storage capacity
- 27×10^{9} cu ft (760,000,000 m^{3}) of natural gas storage capacity

=== Marine Terminals ===
- NGL Import/Export Terminals on the Houston Ship Channel
- Import: unload up to 8,100 Bbls/hr
- Export: load up to 10,000 Bbls/hr

=== Fractionation ===
- 19 NGL and propylene fractionators
- NGL: nine plants, with a net capacity of approximately 439 Mbpd
- Propylene: two facilities, with a net capacity of approximately 87 Mbpd
- Isomerization: three plants, with a net capacity of approximately 116 Mbpd

=== Natural gas processing ===
- 26 plants, with a net processing capacity of 6.3 Bcf/day
