= List of wealthiest families =

Various lists of the richest families (excluding royal families or autocratic ruling dynasties) are published internationally, by Forbes as well as other business magazines.

There is a distinction between wealth held by identifiable individual billionaires or a "nuclear family" and the wider notion of an extended family or a historical "dynasty," where the wealth of a historically family-owned company or business has become distributed between various branches of descendants, usually throughout decades, ranging from several individuals to hundreds of offspring.

According to an August 1, 2020 article from Bloomberg, the world's 25 richest families control more than $1.4 trillion (1,400,000,000,000) of wealth. That figure will change dramatically through time. Bloomberg then puts the top 25 combined wealth at $2.9 trillion at the end of 2025. According to this list as of July 26, 2026 only the world’s 12 richest families, each over $100 billion, control approximately $2.5 trillion of wealth, and the top 25 controls $3.4 trillion.

== Contemporary rankings ==
Note: The list includes families who, according to reliable sources, have a combined net worth of 5 billion US dollars and above.

List of wealthiest families. In US$ billions (estimated)
Rank	Family name	Notable members	Combined wealth	Source of wealth	Country or region
1	Walton	Jim Walton, S. Robson Walton, Alice Walton, Lukas Walton, Christy Walton, Nancy Walton Laurie, Ann Walton Kroenke (Sam Walton, Bud Walton)	585 - 589 (2026)	Walmart, Sam's Club	United States
2	Ellison	David, Megan, Larry	160 (2026)	Oracle Corporation, Skydance, Annapurna Pictures	United States
3	Arnault	Bernard, Delphine, Antoine, Frederic Jean, Alexander, Xavier Niel	123 (2026)	LVMH (259B USD or more as a family*)	France
4	Adani	Gautam Adani, Priti Adani, Karan Adani, Jeet Adani, Vinod Adani, Pranav Adani, Rajesh Adani	187.3 (2025)	Adani Group, Adani Enterprises, Adani Ports & SEZ, Adani Green Energy, Adani Power, Ambuja Cements, Adani Defence And Aerospace, NDTV	India
5	Koch	Julia Koch, Charles Koch, Bill Koch (Fred C. Koch, David Koch, Frederick R. Koch)	169 (2026)	Koch Industries	United States
6	Ortega	Amancio Ortega, Sandra Ortega Mera (Rosalía Mera)	164 (2025)	Inditex (including Zara)	Spain
8	Tata	Noel Tata, Neville Tata, Leah Tata, Maya Tata (Jamsetji Tata, Dorab Tata, Ratanji Tata, J. R. D. Tata, Ratanji Dadabhoy Tata, Naval Tata, Ratan Tata)	137.5 (2026) (The market value of all the companies combined controlled by the Tatas is $400bn) (Note: The $136 billion in assets include charitable foundations and other investment vehicles which are not owned by individual shareholders but still retain successive management.)	Tata Sons, Tata Group, Tata Consultancy Services, Tata Motors, Tata Steel, Jaguar Land Rover, Tata Housing Development Company, Tata Projects, Tata Power, Tata Elxsi, Tata Advanced Systems, Titan Company, Tata Consumer Products, Tata Starbucks, Tata Capital, Tata Investment Corp, Indian Hotels Company Limited, Air India Limited, Tata Communications.	India
9	Ambani	Mukesh Ambani, Nita Ambani, Isha Ambani, Anant Ambani, Akash Ambani, Anil Ambani, Tina Ambani, Jai Anmol Ambani, Jai Anshul Ambani, Shloka, Radhika, Kokilaben, Dhirubhai	125 - 170 (2026)	Reliance Industries, Reliance Jio Infocomm, Reliance Retail, Reliance Power, Reliance Infrastructure, Reliance Capital, Reliance Entertainment, Reliance Defence	India
7	Mars	Jacqueline Mars, John Franklyn Mars, Marijke Mars, Pamela Mars-Wright, Valerie Mars, Victoria Mars (Franklin Clarence Mars)	147 (2025)	Mars Inc.	United States
10	Slim	Carlos Slim, Carlos Slim Domit, Patrick Slim, Julián Slim	132 (2025)	Telmex, América Móvil, Grupo Carso	Mexico
11	Hermes	Pierre-Alexis Dumas, Axel Dumas	111.6 - 215 (2026)	Hermès	France
13	Bettencourt	Françoise Bettencourt Meyers	101 (2025)	L'Oréal	France
14	Thomson	David Thomson, Peter Thomson, Kenneth Thomson (Roy Thomson)	80 - 98 (2024)	Thomson Reuters, The Woodbridge Company	Canada
15	Wertheimer	Alain Wertheimer, Gérard Wertheimer	95 (2025)	Chanel	France
12	Aponte	Gianluigi Aponte, Rafaela Aponte-Diamant	102 (2026)	Mediterranean Shipping Company (MSC)	Switzerland; Italy; Israel
16	Merck	Emanuel Merck, Johannes Freiherr von Baillou, Frank Stangenberg-Haverkamp, Jon Baumhauer	81 (2022)	Merck KGaA, Merck & Co.	Germany; United States
17	Boehringer / von Baumbach	Albert Boehringer, Barbara Boehringer, Christian Boehringer, Christoph Boehringer, Isabel Boehringer, Mathias Boehringer, Otto Boehringer, Philipp Boehringer, Erich von Baumbach, Franz von Baumbach, Hubertus von Baumbach, Johannes von Baumbach, Katharina von Baumbach, Maximilian von Baumbach, Ulrike von Baumbach (Hubertus von Baumbach)	81 (2025)	Boehringer Ingelheim	Germany
18	Kuehne	Klaus-Michael Kühne, Leus Kuehne	70 - 88 (2025)	Shipping, Holdings	Germany
19	Larrea Mota Velasco	Germán Larrea Mota Velasco, Jorge Larrea, Sara Mota De Larrea	85.5 (2026)	Grupo Mexico (mining)	Mexico
20	Ofer	Eyal Ofer, Idan Ofer, Liora Ofer (Sammy Ofer)	70 (2024)	Real estate, shipping, investments	Israel
21	Ferrero	Michele Ferrero, Maria Franca Fissolo, Giovanni Ferrero, Pietro Ferrero Jr.	60 (2025)	Ferrero SpA	Italy
22	Quandt	Stefan Quandt, Susanne Klatten (Herbert Quandt, Johanna Quandt)	58 (2024)	BMW	Germany
23	Cargill-MacMillan	Pauline MacMillan Keinath, Gwendolyn Sontheim Meyer, Austen Cargill, II., James Cargill, II., Marianne Liebmann, Alexandra Daitch, Sarah MacMillan, Lucy Stitzer, Cargill MacMillan, III., John MacMillan, Martha MacMillan, William MacMillan (William Wallace Cargill, Austen Cargill, James R. Cargill, Marion MacMillan Pictet, Cargill MacMillan Sr., Cargill MacMillan Jr., John H. MacMillan Sr., John H. MacMillan, John Hugh MacMillan, Whitney MacMillan, Whitney Duncan MacMillan)	56.2 (2024)	Cargill	United States
24	Hoffmann, Oeri	Maja Oeri, Fritz Hoffmann-La Roche	53.8 (2024)	Roche, Genentech	Switzerland
25	Van Damme, De Spoelberch, De Mevius	Three families, the collective enterprise of which has roots in the 14th century	52.9 (2019)	Anheuser-Busch InBev	Belgium
26	Porsche/Piëch	Hans Michel Piëch, Wolfgang Porsche	52.8 (Note: Approximately euro to dollar conversion rate as of September 2018)	Volkswagen Group	Austria
27	Hartono	Robert Budi Hartono, Michael Bambang Hartono, Armand Wahyudi Hartono, Martin Hartono, Victor Hartono	52 (2024)	Djarum, Bank Central Asia	Indonesia
28	Besnier	Emmanuel Besnier, Jean-Michel Besnier, Marie Besnier Beauvalot	43.3 (2024)	Lactalis	France
29	Pritzker	Thomas Pritzker, Karen Pritzker, Jean (Gigi) Pritzker, Anthony Pritzker, Penny Pritzker, J.B. Pritzker, John Pritzker, Daniel Pritzker, Jennifer Pritzker, Linda Pritzker, Matthew Pritzker, Nicholas Pritzker, Liesel Pritzker Simmons, Adam Pritzker (Nicholas Pritzker)	43.1 (2024)	Hyatt Corporation, Marmon Group	United States
30	Chearavanont	Dhanin Chearavanont, Suphachai Chearavanont, Korawad Chearavanont	37.9 (2019)	Charoen Pokphand	Thailand
31	Johnson	Abigail Johnson, Edward Johnson IV, Elizabeth Johnson (Edward C. Johnson III)	45 (2024)	Fidelity Investments	United States
32	Cox	Anne Cox Chambers, James M. Cox	36.9 (2019)	Cox Enterprises Co.	United States
33	Würth	Adolf Würth, Reinhold Würth, Bettina Würth	35.1 (2025)	Würth Group	Germany
34	Rinehart	Gina Rinehart, Bianca Rinehart, Ginia Rinehart (Lang Hancock)	35 (2024)	Hancock Prospecting	Australia
35	Cathy	Bubba Cathy, Dan Cathy, Trudy Cathy White (Truett Cathy)	33.6 (2024)	Chick-fil-A	United States
36	Jindal	Savitri Jindal, Naveen Jindal, Sajjan Jindal (O.P. Jindal)	43 (2024)	Jindal Group	India
37	Dassault	Laurent Dassault, Thierry Dassault, Marie-Hélène Habert-Dassault, Helena Dassault, Remi Dassault (Marcel Dassault, Serge Dassault, Olivier Dassault)	33.2 (2024)	Dassault Group, diversified	France
38	Mulliez	Gérard Mulliez, Michel Leclercq	33 (2019)	Auchan, Decathlon, Association Familiale Mulliez, and hundreds of other family members (Note: In March 2017, Tharawat Magazine reported that approximately one thousand family members co-own the holding company Association Familiale Mulliez.)	France
39	S. C. Johnson	S. Curtis Johnson	33 (2019)	S. C. Johnson & Son	United States
40	Wallenberg	Marcus Wallenberg Jr., Jacob Wallenberg, Marcus Wallenberg Sr, Gustaf Wallenberg, Marc Wallenberg, Peter Wallenberg Sr., Jacob Wallenberg, Peter Wallenberg Jr., Marcus Wallenberg, Raoul Wallenberg. André Oscar Wallenberg, Knut Agathon Wallenberg.	32.2 (2025) (The market value of all the companies combined controlled by the Wallenbergs is $900bn) (Note: The $32 billion in assets include charitable foundations and other investment vehicles which are not owned by individual shareholders but still retain successive management.) (Note: Approximately euro to dollar conversion rate as of September 2019)	SEB, Ericsson, Nasdaq, EQT, Investor AB, SKF, Astra Zeneca, Electrolux, ABB, Saab AB, Husqvarna, Wärtsilä, Atlas Copco, Stora Enso, Epiroc, Höganäs AB, Munters Group, Wallenberg Foundations, etc.	Sweden
41	Adelson	Miriam Adelson (Sheldon Adelson)	32 (2024)	Las Vegas Sands	Israel; United States
42	Pinault	François Pinault, François-Henri Pinault	31.6 (2024)	Kering	France
43	Hoffmann/Oeri	Fritz Hoffmann-La Roche, André Hoffmann	31.3 (2019)	Roche	Switzerland
44	Albrecht	Karl Albrecht, Theo Albrecht (Berthold Albrecht)	29.9 (2024)	Aldi, Trader Joe's	Germany
45	Garcia	Ernest Garcia II, Ernest Garcia III	29.9 (2025)	DriveTime, Carvana	United States
46	Del Vecchio	Claudio Del Vecchio, Clemente Del Vecchio, Leonardo Maria Del Vecchio, Luca Del Vecchio, Marisa Del Vecchio, Paola Del Vecchio (Leonardo Del Vecchio)	28.2 (2024)	EssilorLuxottica	
47	Henkel	Friedrich Karl Henkel, Simone Bagel-Trah	28.1 (2017)	Henkel	Germany
48	Hearst	William Randolph Hearst and numerous others	28 (2016)	Hearst Corporation	United States
49	Lauder	Leonard Lauder, Ronald Lauder, Jane Lauder, William Lauder, Aerin Lauder (Estée Lauder)	27.4 (2024)	Estée Lauder	United States
50	Safra	Vicky Safra (Jacob Safra, Joseph Safra, Moise Safra, Lily Safra)	27 (2024)	Fibria, Chiquita Brands International, Safra Group, Banco Safra, J. Safra Sarasin, Safra National Bank of New York	Syria; Lebanon; Brazil; Greece; Switzerland
51	Saadé	Jacques Saadé, Jr., Rodolphe Saadé, Tanya Saadé Zeenny (Jacques Saadé)	26.7 (2024)	CMA CGM	France; Lebanon
52	Schaeffler	Georg F. W. Schaeffler (Georg Schaeffler Jr.), Maria-Elisabeth Schaeffler, Georg Schaeffler Sr.	25.9 (2017)	Schaeffler Group	Germany; Austria
53	Samsung family	Jay Y. Lee, Hong Ra-hee, Lee Boo-jin, Lee Seo-hyun, Hong Seok-joh, Chung Yong-jin, Hong Seok-hyun, Lee Myung-hee, Lee Jay-hyun, Lee in-hee (Lee Byung-chul, Lee Kun-hee)	25.6 (2024)	Samsung, Shinsegae, CJ, Hansol, JoongAng Group, BGF Group	South Korea
54	Kristiansen	Sofie Kirk Kristiansen, Thomas Kirk Kristiansen, Agnete Kirk Thinggaard, Kjeld Kirk Kristiansen (Ole Kirk Christiansen	25.5 (2024)	The Lego Group	Denmark
55	Moreira Salles	Fernando Roberto Moreira Salles, Pedro Moreira Salles, João Moreira Salles, Giancarlo Moreira Salles, Walter Moreira Salles Jr. (Walter Moreira Salles)	25.5 (2024)	Itaú Unibanco	Brazil
56	Otto	Alexander Otto, Michael Otto, Katharina Otto-Bernstein, Maren Otto, Benjamin Otto (Werner Otto)	25.3 (2024)	Otto Group	Germany
57	Damani	Radhakishan Damani, Gopikishan Damani	39 (2024)	DMart	India
58	Lee (Shau Kee)	Lee Shau Kee, Peter Lee Ka-kit, Martin Lee Ka-shing	24.1 (2016)	Henderson Land Development	Hong Kong
59	Birla	Kumar Mangalam Birla, Ananya Birla, Aryaman Birla, Chandra Kant Birla, Shobhana Bhartia, Yashovardhan Birla, Madhav Prasad Birla	24 (2025)	Birla Institute of Technology & Science, Aditya Birla Group, Grasim Industries, CK Birla Group, Yash Birla Group, The Hindustan Times, M.P Birla Group	India
60	Persson	Stefan Persson, Lottie Tham, Karl-Johan Persson, Tom Persson, Charlotte Soderstrom (Erling Persson)	23.7 (2024)	H&M	Sweden
61	Brenninkmeijer	Clemens Brenninkmeijer, August Brenninkmeyer, Stephan Brenninkmeijer, Philippe Brenninkmeyer, Erik Brenninkmeijer	23.4 (2017)	Cofra Group, C&A	Germany; Netherlands
62	Cheng	Cheng Yu-tung, Henry Cheng, Adrian Cheng	22.5 (2017)	Chow Tai Fook	Hong Kong
63	Reimann	Wolfgang Reimann, Matthias Reimann-Andersen, Stefan Reimann-Andersen, Renate Reimann-Haas (Albert Reimann)	22.4 (2024)	JAB Holding Company	Germany
64	Bajaj	Rajiv Bajaj, Sanjiv Bajaj, Madhur Bajaj, Niraj Bajaj, Shekhar Bajaj (Jamnalal Bajaj, Rahul Bajaj)	21.8 (2024)	Bajaj Group	India
65	Rausing	Finn Rausing, Jorn Rausing, Kirsten Rausing (Hans Rausing)	21.6 (2024)	Tetra Laval	Sweden
66	Duncan	Dan Duncan, Randa Williams, Milane Frantz, Dannine Avara, Scott_Duncan	21.5 (2016)	Enterprise Products	United States
67	Tsai (Wan-Tsai)	Daniel Tsai, Richard Tsai, Tsai Hong-tu, Tsai Cheng-ta, T.Y. Tsai (Tsai Wan-lin)	20.9 (2024)	Cathay United Bank, Cathay Life Insurance	Taiwan
68	Godrej	Smita Crishna-Godrej, Adi Godrej, Jamshyd Godrej, Nadir Godrej, Pirojsha Adi Godrej	19.9 (2025)	Godrej Group, Godrej and Boyce	India
69	Mistry	Shapoor Mistry, Firoz Mistry, Zahan Mistry (Shapoorji Mistry, Cyrus Mistry)	19.7 (2024)	Shapoorji Pallonji Group	India; Ireland
70	Struengmann	Andreas Struengmann, Thomas Struengmann	19.6 (2024)	BioNTech	Germany
71	Reuben	David Reuben, Simon Reuben	19.2 (2024)	Real estate, financial services, commodity trading	United Kingdom
72	Chirathivat	Tiang Chirathivat (Cheng)	19.3 (2017)	Central Group	Thailand
73	Blocher	Rahel Blocher, Magdalena Martullo-Blocher, Markus Blocher, Miriam Baumann-Blocher (Christoph Blocher)	18.8 (2024)	Ems-Chemie, Dottikon ES Holding	Switzerland
74	Ziff	Daniel Ziff, Dirk Ziff, Robert Ziff (William Bernard Ziff Jr.)	18.6 (2024)	Publishing, Ziff Davis, Ziff Brothers Investments	United States
75	Newhouse	Samuel Irving Newhouse Jr., Donald Newhouse	18.5 (2016)	Advance Publications	United States
76	Mittal	Lakshmi Mittal, Aditya Mittal and Pramod Mittal	72 (2021)	ArcelorMittal	India
125	Bhatia	Kapil Bhatia, Rahul Bhatia	11 (2026)	Indigo	India
77	Bukhman	Dmitri Bukhman, Igor Bukhman	18 (2024)	Online games	Israel
78	Herz	Michael Herz, Wolfgang Herz, Christian Herz, Michaela Herz	18 (2024)	Tchibo, Beiersdorf, Mayfair SE	Germany
79	Stryker	Ronda Stryker, Jon Stryker, Pat Stryker (Homer Stryker)	17.5 (2024)	Stryker Corporation	United States
80	Hunt	Ray Lee Hunt, W. Herbert Hunt, Clark Hunt, Daniel Hunt, Lamar Hunt, Jr., Sharron Hunt (H. L. Hunt)	17.5 (2024)	Hunt Oil Company, Hunt Petroleum, Kansas City Chiefs	United States
81	Bertarelli	Ernesto Bertarelli, Dona Bertarelli	17.4 (2024)	Serono	Italy; Switzerland
82	Hariri	Rafic Hariri, Bahia Hariri, Bahaa Hariri, Saad Hariri, Ayman Hariri, Fahd Hariri, Hind Hariri	17 (2017)	Arab Bank, GroupeMed, Saudi Oger, The Daily Star, Future TV	France; Lebanon; Saudi Arabia
83	Kuok	Robert Kuok	16.6 (2017)	Kuok Group	Malaysia
84	Meijer	Doug Meijer, Hank Meijer, Mark Meijer (Hendrik Meijer)	16.5 (2024)	Meijer	United States
85	Braun	Anna Maria Braun, Otto Phillip Braun, Barbara Braun-Lüdicke	16 (2024)	B. Braun	Germany
86	Tschira	Gerda Tschira, Harald Tschira, Udo Tschira (Klaus Tschira)	15.6 (2024)	SAP	Germany
87	Fertitta	Tilman Fertitta, Frank Fertitta, III., Lorenzo Fertitta	15.5 (2024)	Houston Rockets, UFC	United States
88	Patel		15 (2017)	Cadila Healthcare	India
89	Pratt	Anthony Pratt, Fiona Geminder, Heloise Pratt (Richard Pratt, Leon Pratt)	14.9 (2024)	Visy	Australia
90	Chao	Albert Chao, James Chao, Dorothy Chao Jenkins (Ting Tsung Chao)	14.7 (2024)	Westlake Corporation	United States
91	Collison	John Collison, Patrick Collison	14.4 (2024)	Stripe	Ireland
92	Sy	Hans Sy, Henry Sy Jr., Herbert Sy, Harley Sy, Teresita Sy Coson, Elizabeth Sy (Henry Sy)	14.4 (2024)	SM Investments Corporation	Philippines
93	Du Pont	List of family members	14.3 (2016)	Real estate, DuPont Chemical Company	United States
94	Ng	Philip Ng, Robert Ng (Ng Teng Fong)	14.3 (2024)	Far East Organization	Singapore
95	Saji	Nobutada Saji, Keizo Saji, Shinjirō Torii	14.2 (2017)	Suntory	Japan
96	Heineken	Charlene de Carvalho-Heineken	14.1 (2024)	Heineken	Netherlands
97	Coates	Denise Coates, John Coates, Peter Coates	13.8 (2024)	Bet365	United Kingdom
98	Bass	Robert Bass, Sid Bass, Ed Bass, Lee Bass (Sid Richardson)	13.8 (2024)	Oak Hill Capital (energy, development)	United States
99	Goldman	Sol Goldman, Amy Goldman Fowler	13.7 (2016)	Solil Management	United States
100	Arison	Micky Arison, Shari Arison (Ted Arison)	13.5 (2024)	Carnival Cruises	Israel; United States
101	Salinas Pliego	Ricardo Salinas Pliego	13.4 (2024)	TV Azteca, Grupo Elektra	Mexico
102	Busch	Adolphus Busch, Adolphus Busch III, August Anheuser Busch Sr., August Busch III, August Busch IV	13.4 (2016)	Anheuser-Busch	United States
103	Pao	Yue-Kong Pao	13.4 (2017)	BW Group	Hong Kong
104	Yoovidhya	Chalerm Yoovidhya	13.1 (2017)	Red Bull	Thailand
105	Sackler	Arthur M. Sackler, Mortimer Sackler, Raymond Sackler, Richard Sackler	13 (2016)	Purdue Pharma, Oxycontin	United States
106	Dangote	Aliko Dangote, Sani Dangote	34 (2017)	Dangote Group	Nigeria
107	Roig-Herrero	Juan Roig, Hortensia Herrero, Fernando Roig, Fernando Masaveu Herrero	12.9 (2024)	Mercadona	Spain
108	Kwok	Geoffrey Kwok, Jonathan Kwok, Adam Kwok, Thomas Kwok, Christopher Kwok, Edward Kwok, Raymond Kwok (Kwok Tak-Seng, Kwong Siu-hing)	12.8 (2024)	Sun Hung Kai Properties	Hong Kong
109	Powell-Jobs	Laurene Powell Jobs (Steve Jobs)	15 (2025)	Apple Inc., Disney	United States
110	Sawiris	Nassef Sawiris, Naguib Sawiris, Samih Sawiris (Onsi Sawiris)	12.6 (2024)	Orascom Construction Industries, Orascom Telecom Holding, Orascom Development, Orascom Group	Egypt
111	Jacobs	Johann Jacobs, Walther J. Jacobs, Klaus Johann Jacobs	12.5 (2018)	Jacobs, Barry Callebaut, The Adecco Group	Germany; Switzerland
112	Schindler		12.5 (2018)	Schindler Group	Switzerland
113	Weston	Guy Weston, George Weston, Galen Weston Jr., W. Garfield Weston, Garry Weston, George G. Weston, Alannah Weston, Kate Hobhouse, Jana Khayat, Emma Adamo	12.3 (2013)	Loblaw Companies, George Weston Limited, Wittington Investments	Canada
114	Brown	George Garvin Brown IV	12.3 (2016)	Brown-Forman	United States
115	Marshall	J. Howard Marshall II, Elaine Tettemer Marshall	31 (2025)	Koch Industries	United States
116	Prada	Miuccia Prada, Alberto Prada, Marina Prada (Mario Prada)	11.8 (2024)	Prada	Italy
117	Mehta	Samir Mehta, Sudhir Mehta	11.6 (2024)	Torrent Group	India
118	Del Pino	Rafael Del Pino, Maria Del Pino, D. Leopoldo Del Pino	11.5 (2024)	Ferrovial S.A.	Spain
119	Mellon	Andrew Mellon, Matthew Mellon, Christopher Mellon	11.5 (2016)	Mellon Bank	United States
120	Garcia	Ernest Garcia, II., Ernest Garcia, III	11.3 (2024)	Carvana	United States
121	von Schwangau	Karl von Schwangau III, Ludwig von Schwangau Jr, Karl von Schwangau IV	11.3 (2017)	Knorr-Bremse, Vossloh, BlackRock	Germany; United States
122	Resnick	Lynda Resnick, Stewart Resnick	11.2 (2024)	Agriculture	United States
123	Schörling	Sofia Högberg Schörling, Märta Schörling Andreen (Melker Schörling)	11.2 (2024)	Melker Schörling AB (MSAB)	Sweden
124	Rocca	Gianfelice Rocca, Paolo Rocca (Agostino Rocca)	11.2 (2024)	Techint Group	Italy
125	Butt	Charles Butt	11 (2016)	HEB Grocery Company	United States
126	Kadoorie	Michael Kadoorie	11 (2017)	CLP Holding	Hong Kong
127	Dos Santos	José Eduardo dos Santos, Isabel dos Santos, José Filomeno dos Santos, Coréon Dú	11 (2017)		Angola
128	Rockefeller	List of family members	11 (2016)	Standard Oil Company, Chase Manhattan Bank	United States
129	Gallo	Ernest Gallo, Julio Gallo	10.7 (2016)	E & J Gallo Winery	United States
130	Uihlein	Elizabeth Uihlein, Richard Uihlein	10.4 (2024)	Uline	
131	Widjaja	Eka Tjipta Widjaja, Frankie Widjaja, Franky Oesman Widjaja, Teguh Ganda Widjaja, Indra Widjaja, Sukmawati Widjaja	10.4 (2017)	Sinar Mas Group	Indonesia
132	Glazer	Avram Glazer, Bryan Glazer, Edward Glazer, Joel Glazer, Kevin Glazer, Darcie Glazer Kassewitz	10.2 (2024)	Manchester United, Tampa Bay Buccaneers	United States
133	Benetton	Giuliana Benetton, Luciano Benetton, Sabrina Benetton, Barbara Benetton (Carlo Benetton, Gilberto Benetton)	10.1 (2024)	Benetton Group	Italy
134	Kulibaev	Timur Kulibaev, Dinara Kulibaeva	10 (2024)	Halyk Bank	Kazakhstan
135	Lohia	Sri Prakash Lohia, Aloke Lohia (Mohan Lal Lohia, Seema Lohia)	9.9 (2024)	Indorama Corporation	Indonesia; India
136	Chung (Ju-yung)	Chung Mong-koo, Chung Eui-sun, Chung Mong-joon, Chung Mong-gyu, Chung Mong-won	9.8 (2024)	Hyundai Motor Group, Hyundai Heavy Industries, Hyundai Department Store Group, Halla Group, HDC Group, KCC Corporation	South Korea
137	Gutserievs		9.8 (2016)	BIN Group	Russia
138	Tisch	Jonathan Tisch, Wilma Tisch, Laurie Tisch, Steven Tisch, James Tisch, Andrew Tisch (Laurence Tisch, Bob Tisch)	9.6 (2024)	Loews, New York Giants	United States
139	Oppenheimer	Nicky Oppenheimer (Ernest Oppenheimer)	9.5 (2024)	De Beers	South Africa
140	Coppel Luken	Enrique Coppel Luken, Rubén Coppel Luken, Alberto Coppel Luken, José Coppel Luken, Agustín Coppel Luken	9.5 (2024)	Grupo Coppel	Mexico
141	Grosvenor	Hugh Grosvenor, 7th Duke of Westminster	9.5 (euros, 2017)	Grosvenor Group	United Kingdom
142	Liebherr	Hans Liebherr, Hans Liebherr jr., Willi Liebherr, Markus Liebherr, Isolde Liebherr, Hubert Liebherr	9.5 (2018)	Liebherr Group	Germany; Switzerland
143	Livingstone	Ian Livingstone, Richard Livingstone	9.4 (2024)	Real estate	United Kingdom
144	Dorrance	Mary Alice Dorrance Malone, Bennett Dorrance, John Dorrance, III. (John Thompson Dorrance, Dorrance Hill Hamilton)	9.4 (2024)	Campbell's	United States
145	Alfond	Bill Alfond, Susan Alfond, Ted Alfond (Harold Alfond, Peter Alfond)	9.3 (2024)	Dexter Shoe Company	United States
146	Shoen	Mark Shoen, Joe Shoen	9.3 (2024)	U-Haul	United States
147	Xie	Ken Xie, Michael Xie	9.3 (2024)	Fortinet	United States
148	Herlin	Antti Herlin, Ilkka Herlin, Ilona Herlin, Heikki Herlin (Heikki H. Herlin)	9.2 (2024)	Kone, Cargotec	Finland
149	Rogers	Edward S. Rogers Jr., Edward S. Rogers III	9.13 (2017)	Rogers Communications	Canada
150	Burman	Vivek Chand Burman, Anand Burman, Amit Burman, Saket Burman, Pradip Burman	9 (2024)	Dabur	India; United Kingdom
151	Salim	Sudono Salim, Anthoni Salim, Axton Salim	8.8 (2017)	Salim Group	Indonesia
152	Kwek	Kwek Leng Beng, Kwek Leng Kee, Kwek Leng Keow, Kwek Leng Peck (Kwek Hong Png)	8.7 (2024)	Hong Leong Group	Singapore
153	Koo (In-hwoi) family	Koo In-hwoi, Koo Cha-kyung, Koo Bon-moo, Koo Bon-joon, Koo-Bon sik, Koo Bon-neung, Koo Kwang-mo, etc.	8.7 (2017)	LG Group, LS Group, LIG Group, LT Group, LX Group, LF Group, Ourhome Corp, KleanNara	South Korea
154	Haefner	Martin Haefner, Eva Maria Bucher-Haefner	8.4 (2024)	AMAG, CA Technologies	Switzerland
155	Wilson	Alan Wilson, Bruce Wilson, John Wilson	8.4 (2024)	Reece Group	Australia
156	Lee Man Tat	Lee Man Tat	8.4 (2017)	Lee Kum Kee	Hong Kong
157	Bailleres Gual	Alejandro Baillères Gual (Alberto Baillères)	8.1 (2024)	Grupo Bal (mining)	Mexico
158	Garavoglia	Luca Garavoglia, Alessandra Garavoglia	8 (2024)	Campari Group	Italy
159	Haniel	Franz Markus Haniel	8 (2017)	Franz Haniel & Cie., Metro AG, CWS-boco Gruppe	Germany
160	Koç	Semahat Sevim Arsel, Rahmi Koç, Suna Kıraç, Mustafa Vehbi Koç, Mehmet Ömer Koç, Ali Yıldırım Koç	8 (2016)	Koç Holding	Turkey
161	Şahenk		7-8 (2016)	Doğuş Holding	Turkey
162	Sabancı	Hacı Ömer Sabancı, İhsan Sabancı, Güler Sabancı, Sevgi Sabancı, Sakıp Sabancı, Sevil Sabancı, Ömer Sabancı, Mehmet Sabancı, Şevket Sabancı, Ali Sabancı, Özdemir Sabancı, Demir Sabancı	7-8 (for each one of Şevket, Erol, and Türkan's families) (2016)	Sabancı Holding	Turkey
163	Simmons	Harold Simmons	8 (2013)	Businessman, Titanium investments	United States
164	Olayan		8 (2017)	Diversified, inheritance	Saudi Arabia
165	Berlusconi	Marina Berlusconi, Pier Silvio Berlusconi, Barbara Berlusconi, Eleonora Berlusconi, Luigi Berlusconi (Silvio Berlusconi, Paolo Berlusconi)	15 (2024)	Fininvest	Italy
166	Law	Law Kar Po, Allen Law	7.8 (2017)	Bossini	Hong Kong
167	Heraeus	Wilhelm Carl Heraeus, Jürgen Heraeus, Jan Rinnert	7.7 (2017)	Heraeus	Germany
168	Irving	K. C. Irving, James K. Irving, Arthur Irving, John E. Irving, Sarah Irving, Robert Irving, Mary Jean Irving, Jean E. Irving, Judy Irving, John K. F. Irving, Colin D. Irving	7.65 (2017)	Irving Group of Companies, Irving Oil, J. D. Irving	Canada
169	Fisher	John Fisher, Robert Fisher, Doris Fisher, William Fisher (Donald Fisher)	7.6 (2024)	Gap Inc.	United States
170	Mori		7.6 (2017)	Mori Building Company	Japan
171	Firmenich	Patrick Firmenich	7.5 (2018)	Firmenich	Switzerland
172	Schmidheiny	Max Schmidheiny Stephan Schmidheiny, Thomas Schmidheiny	7.5 (2018)	Diversified (Holcim, i.a.)	Switzerland
173	D'Ieteren	Nicolas D'Ieteren, Catheline Perier D'Ieteren	7.3 (2024)	D'Ieteren	Belgium
174	Siemens	Werner von Siemens, Carl Wilhelm Siemens, Carl Heinrich von Siemens, Georg von Siemens, Arnold von Siemens, Georg Wilhelm von Siemens, Carl Friedrich von Siemens, Hermann von Siemens, Ernst von Siemens, Peter von Siemens, Nathalie von Siemens, Peter C. von Siemens	7.3 (2017)	Siemens	Germany
175	Zekelman	Barry Zekelman, Clayton Zekelman, Alan Zekelman	7.2 (2024)	Zekelman Industries	Canada
176	Singh Dhingra	Gurbachan Singh Dhingra, Kuldip Singh Dhingra	7 (2024)	Berger Paints India	India
177	Lal		7 (2017)	Eicher Group	India
187	Rotenberg	Arkady Rotenberg, Igor Rotenberg, Boris Rotenberg	6.9 (2024)	Stroygazmontazh (S.G.M. Group)	Russia
179	Oetker	Alfred Oetker, Carl Ferdinand Oetker, Julia Oetker	6.9 (2024)	Geschwister Oetker	Germany
180	Flick	Friedrich Karl Flick, Ingrid Ragger	6.9 (euros, 2014)		Austria
181	Al Jaber	Mohamed Bin Issa Al Jaber	6.76 (euros, 2017)	MBI International Holding Group	United Kingdom
182	Desmarais	Paul Desmarais	6.71 (2017)	Power Corporation of Canada	Canada
183	Bangur		6.7 (2017)	Shree Cement	India
184	Batista	Joesley Batista, Wesley Batista (José Batista Sobrinho)	6.6 (2024)	JBS S.A.	Brazil
185	Engelhorn	Curt Engelhorn, Traudl Engelhorn-Vechiatto,	6.5 (2018)	Pharmaceuticals firm Boehringer Mannheim	Germany
186	Kwee	Kwee Liong Keng, Kwee Liong Phing, Kwee Liong Seen, Kwee Liong Tek	6.4 (2024)	Pontiac Land	Singapore
187	Khoo		6.4 (2017)	Maybank	Singapore
188	Wertheimer	Stef Wertheimer	6.3 (2024)	Iscar Metalworking	Israel
189	Perfetti	Giorgio Perfetti, Augusto Perfetti	6.3 (2024)	Perfetti Van Melle	Italy
190	Johnson	Barbara Piasecka Johnson, Bertram and Diana Firestone, Mary Lea Johnson Richards, Casey Johnson, Jamie Johnson (filmmaker), John Seward Johnson II, John Seward Johnson I, Robert Wood Johnson I, Robert Wood Johnson II, Robert Wood Johnson III, Woody Johnson	6.3 (2015)	Johnson & Johnson	United States
191	Chey (Tae-won) family	Chey Tae-won, Chey Ki-won	6.3 (2017)	SK Group	South Korea
192	Wee		6.25 (2017)	United Overseas Bank	Singapore
193	Marinho	João Roberto Marinho, José Roberto Marinho, Roberto Irineu Marinho (Roberto Marinho)	6.2 (2024)	Grupo Globo, Rede Globo	Brazil
194	Sehgal		6.15 (2017)	Auto parts	India
195	Wadia		10 (2026)	Diversified	India
196	Zobel de Ayala	List of family members	6.13 (2017)	Ayala Corporation	Philippines
197	Feffer	David Feffer, Daniel Feffer, Jorge Feffer, Ruben Feffer (Leon Feffer, Max Feffer)	6.1 (2024)	Suzano (pulp and paper)	Brazil
198	Kushal Pal Singh		15 (2017)	Real estate	India
199	Duff	James Duff, Thomas Duff	6 (2024)	Duff Capital Investors	United States
200	Richardson		5.95 (2017)	James Richardson & Sons	Canada
201	Mansour	Mohamed Mansour, Youssef Mansour, Yasseen Mansour (Loutfy Mansour)	5.8 (2024)	Mansour Group	Egypt
202	Wirtgen	Jurgen Wirtgen, Stefan Wirtgen (Reinhard Wirtgen)	5.8 (2024)	Wirtgen Group	Germany
203	Sands	Robert Sands, Richard Sands (Marvin Sands)	5.7 (2024)	Liquor	United States
204	Mikati	Najib Mikati, Taha Mikati	5.6 (2024)	M1 Group	Lebanon
205	Knauf	Karl Knauf, Christine Knauf, Robert Knauf, Martin Knauf, Alexander Knauf	5.6 (2024)	Knauf Gips KG (building materials)	Germany
206	Fielmann	Marc Fielmann, Sophie Luise Fielmann (Guenther Fielmann)	5.6 (2024)	Fielmann AG (optometry)	Germany
207	Ermirio de Moraes	Jose Roberto Ermirio de Moraes, Jose Ermirio de Moraes Neto, Neide Helena de Moraes, Clóvis Ermírio de Moraes (Jose Ermirio de Moraes, Antônio Ermírio de Moraes, Ermirio Pereira de Moraes, Maria Helena Moraes Scripilliti)	5.6 (2024)	Votorantim Group	Brazil
208	Wynn	Steve Wynn, Elaine Wynn	5.5 (2024)	Casinos (The Mirage, Treasure Island, Bellagio and Wynn Las Vegas)	United States
209	von Finck	August von Finck Sr., August von Finck Jr., August François von Finck	5.5 (2018)	Merck Finck & Co., Mövenpick, Von Roll Holding, and investment in many other companies	Germany; Switzerland
210	Hilti	Martin Hilti, Eugen Hilti	5.5 (2018)	Hilti	Liechtenstein; Switzerland
211	Marguerre	Wolfgang Marguerre, Frederic Marguerre, Tobias Marguerre	5.5 (2018)	Octapharma	Germany; Switzerland
212	Miele and Zinkann	Carl Miele, Reinhard Zinkann, Rudolf Miele, Peter Zinkann, Markus Miele, Reinhard Zinkann Jr.	5.5 (2017)	Miele	Germany
213	Winklevoss	Cameron Winklevoss, Tyler Winklevoss	5.4 (2024)	Gemini	United States
214	Saputo	Lino Saputo, Francesco Saputo, Joey Saputo, Mirella Saputo	5.4 (2024)	Saputo Inc.	Canada
215	Getty	J. Paul Getty, Sir Paul Getty, John Paul Getty III, Ariadne Getty, Balthazar Getty	5.4 (2015)	Getty Oil	United States
216	Erdemoğlu	İbrahim Erdemoğlu, Ali Erdemoğlu	5.3 (2024)	SASA Polyester (carpet)	Turkey
217	Bouygues	Martin Bouygues, Olivier Bouygues	5.2 (2024)	Bouygues Group	France
218	Tung Chee Hwa and Chee Chen	Tung Chee Hwa	5.2 (2017)	Shipping	Hong Kong
219	Freudenberg	Carl Johann Freudenberg, Reinhart Freudenberg, Wolfram Freudenberg, Martin Wentzler	5.2 (2017)	Freudenberg Group	Germany
220	Shin (Kyuk-ho) family	Shin Dong-bin, Shin Kyuk-ho, Shin Dong-joo, Shin Choon-ho, etc.	5.0 (2015)	Lotte Group, Nongshim, Pulemil	South Korea
221	Lo	Lo Ying-shek, Vincent Lo, Poman Lo	5 (2017)	Shui On Group	Hong Kong
222	Munjal	Pawan Munjal, Renu Munjal, Suman Munjal (Brijmohan Lall Munjal)	4.9 (2024)	Hero Group	India
223	Azrieli	David Azrieli, Danna Azrieli, Naomi Azrieli, Sharon Azrieli	4.8 (2024)	Azrieli Group	Israel; Canada
224	Smith	Ryan Smith, Jared Smith, Scott Smith	4.8 (2024)	Qualtrics	United States

== Historical ==
Excluding royal dynasties and land-owning aristocracy, the wealthiest families since the emergence of banking and early capitalism in the Italian Renaissance were:

- The Rothschild family of bankers became the richest family in the mid-19th century. The family's accumulated wealth has been divided among many descendants, only one of which (Benjamin de Rothschild) was officially recognized as a billionaire. Determining the family's exact wealth has been deemed implausible; conspiracy theories claiming the family is worth trillions of dollars have not been proven.
- The Bardi family of Florence (14th century)
- The Medici family, as owners of the Medici Bank, the richest family in 15th-century Europe.
- The Gondi family of Florence, financial partners of the Medici family in the 15th century.
- The Fugger family of mercantile bankers and venture capitalists, the richest family in the 16th century.
- The Welser family, alongside the Fugger one of the most important families of merchant bankers in 16th-century Europe.
- The Baring family, owners of an important merchant bank in London in the 18th to 19th centuries.
- The Schröder family, a leading Hanseatic family of Hamburg in the 18th to 19th centuries.
- The Goldman–Sachs family, owners of the Goldman Sachs investment bank from 1869 to 1912.
- The Venetian noble houses, notably the Contarini, Cornaro, Dandolo, Giustinian, Loredan, Mocenigo, and Morosini families, monopolised pre-modern trade while ruling the Venetian Republic as a mercantile oligarchy.

== Related ==
- Dushyant Karani and family [$3T USD+]
