= Cargill family =

Descendants of William Wallace Cargill

- Business family
- Current region: Minnesota, U.S.
- Founder: William Wallace Cargill
- Estates: Still Pond Mansion, Hennepin County, Minnesota

The Cargill family, also known as the Cargill-MacMillan family, refers to the multi-generational descendants of the American business executive William Wallace Cargill (December 15, 1844 – October 17, 1909) and his son-in-law John H. MacMillan Sr. The Cargill-MacMillan family is the fourth-wealthiest family in America. Descendants of Cargill and MacMillan have owned common equity in the "agribusiness giant" Cargill Inc, one of the largest privately owned corporations in the United States, for over 140 years. William Cargill founded the Cargill company as an Iowa grain storage business in 1865, during the post–Civil War period, and was its CEO for almost 40 years. Following the death of William Cargill in 1909, his son-in-law John MacMillan steered the company out of a debt crisis and into stability. The two branches of the family—the MacMillans and the Cargills—continue to be represented on the board of directors of Cargill Incorporated. The most recent family members appointed to the board are fifth generation.

By 2019, twenty-three Cargill-MacMillan family members owned 88% of the family company, which reported $113.5 billion in revenue in 2019. The "family reportedly keeps 80% of Cargill Inc.'s net income inside the company for reinvestment annually." Forbes listed the family's estimated net worth as $38.8 billion and the source of their wealth as Cargill Inc. Each year, the Cargill-MacMillan family takes about eighteen percent of the "net profits as dividends".

The exact wealth of the family is unknown, as the Cargill company is a privately owned business entity with no obligation to disclose exact ownership. With fourteen billionaires in the family in 2019, the Cargill family has more individual billionaires among its members than any other family anywhere in the world, making them the family with the most wealthy members in history.

While the "low-profile family" owns Cargill, and there are six family members on the 17-member board, family members have not been part of running the company since 1995, when Whitney MacMillan, who had served as Cargill's chairman and chief executive officer (CEO) since 1976, stepped down as chief executive.

The family was also the majority owner of The Mosaic Company, the largest producer of potash and phosphate fertilizer in the United States. In 2011, they sold their sixty-four-percent stake in Mosaic for $24.3 billion.

In 2012, the unknown heiress Margaret Anne Cargill, posthumously earned the #1 spot in the Chronicle of Philanthropy's annual list of America's 50 most generous donors. Margaret Anne Cargill, who died in 2006, had bequeathed all her shares in the Cargill conglomerate to two non-profits, but the funds could not be liquidated from the private company. When Cargill sold Mosaic, the charities received shares of the public Mosaic stock. This represents about $6 billion, which would make these two charities "two of the wealthiest grant makers in the United States."

== Overview ==
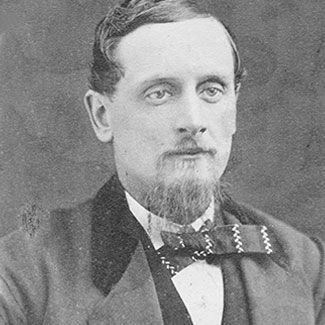
William W. Cargill

The family-owned Cargill Inc., expanded from a "small-scale frontier enterprise"—a grain storage business—with William Cargill's acquisition in 1865 of a "grain flat house" (a warehouse at the end of a railway line in Iowa) into a "complex international organization and a successful competitor in global markets." W. W. Cargill, the "son of Scottish sea captain", was twenty-one years old when he founded the company. He remained as Cargill CEO for 35–40 years. By 1900, the Cargill Elevator Company was a major Midwestern force. Cargill's wealth increased, as the Great Plains were transformed into a breadbasket, providing grain to the country, and the railroads expanded east to west in the last quarter of the nineteenth century.

In 2019, Forbes described Cargill Inc as an "international producer and distributor of agricultural products such as sugar, refined oil, chocolate and turkey" that also "provides risk management, commodities trading and transportation services." Cargill had 160,000 employees.

When W. W. Cargill died in 1909, Cargill Inc faced a "fiscal crisis". As the new President of Cargill Elevator Company, John H. MacMillan, Sr.—Edna Cargill's husband—was able to reassure the company's creditors. He saved the company from bankruptcy and created a work environment that fostered a loyal and dedicated workforce. The second generation of the Cargill family branched into the Cargills and the MacMillans.

In 1936, when Cargill Incorporated was formed with the merger of various Cargill businesses, John MacMillan, Sr. handed the presidency to a third generation of the Cargill-MacMillan family, his son John MacMillan, Jr. By this time, Cargill Inc had offices in Canada and Italy, as well as many subsidiaries across the United States. John MacMillan, Jr. was described as "mercurial", "innovating", and "difficult". His strategies were sometimes "under the scrutiny of the government". The success of the company under his tenure from 1936 to 1960 was due in large part to the team he formed with a second-generation family member, MacMillan Jr's uncle, Austin Cargill, who had joined the company in 1913, and Cargill MacMillan Sr. (1900–1968). Until 1960, when Edwin Kelm was named as president of Cargill Inc, the company's history had been marked by "family complexity". Starting in 1960, "family complexity" ceased to dominate and was "replaced by a generalized professionalism." The involvement of the family was more in the role of ownership, instead of management and directing.

Cargill MacMillan Jr. (1927–2011), Cargill MacMillan Sr.'s (1900–1968) oldest son and the great-grandson of W. W. Cargill, worked at Cargill for 38 years and retired in 1988. He served on the board of directors from 1963 to 1996. His estimated net worth was $2.6 billion when he died. John Hugh MacMillan worked for Cargill Inc for 35 years, from 1955 until his retirement in 1990. He served on the board of directors for many years.

His brother Whitney MacMillan, who was Cargill's chairman and chief executive officer (CEO) from 1976 to 1995, was described by Forbes as the "patriarch of the Cargill-MacMillan clan" who "led the company to become a global conglomerate" in his tenure as CEO. He is "generally credited with successfully running Cargill "when the company realized much of its growth." He was the last Cargill "family member to serve as chief executive officer".

In the mid-1990s, "family factions" made an agreement, which is in the company's bylaws, stipulating that only six members of the family sit on Cargill's 17-person board: four Macmillans and two Cargills.

From 1999 until his retirement in 2007, a nonfamily member, American investor and businessman, Warren Staley, was CEO of Cargill, Inc. of Minneapolis, Minnesota. His career at Cargill spanned almost four decades. A Star Tribune article at the time of his retirement, said that prior to Staley's tenure, Cargill was considered to be "the agricultural industry's version of the CIA". The article described how Cargill had changed in the 1990s as technology improved and global markets became more open, with Cargill expanding into commodity trading and investments "from Vietnam to Argentina."

In a 2007 Forbes article on "The Richest People You've Never Heard of", Cargill Inc was 90 percent owned by the Cargill-MacMillan family and was still the "largest private company in America". The remaining 10 percent was owned by Cargill employees. In 2008 the company employed over 150,000 people in 68 countries, and earned revenues of $106.30 billion.

By 2009, the Cargill family had "owned common equity in the company for over 140 years." As the world economy collapsed and the price of fertilizer decreased, the "food family's fortune" suffered. Their 2009 annual earnings dropped 15% to $3.3 billion. Cargill Inc revenues remained at $117 billion.

By 2009, the family company, Cargill Inc controlled "food from stable to table" including "animal feed, meat, [and] crops" and operated "large commodity trading and risk management operations".

By 2011, Cargill had "nearly $120 billion in revenue and 130,000 employees in 63 countries."

According to a March 2, 2015 article in the Business Insider, Cargill Inc had "75 businesses employing 143,000 people in 67 countries" with a yearly revenue in 2013 of over $134 billion. The Cargill family had at least 14 billionaires. The Cargill company and family—who had at least 14 billionaires—were "famously quiet", living "extremely private lives, many of them on ranches and farms in Montana," according to Forbes.

In 2016, there were major changes in Cargill Inc. under non-family Cargill CEO David MacLennan, which included streamlining the company, making major cuts and divestments, restructuring, and acquisitions. A new generation of the Cargill family was appointed to the board of directors, according to the Wall Street Journal.

By July 2019, Business Insider ranked the Cargill-MacMillan family as the fourth richest billionaire family in the United States. The magazine listed the family's estimated net worth as $38.8 billion and the source of their wealth as Cargill Inc. By 2019, "23 members of the Cargill-MacMillan family own 88% of [Cargill Inc]. The company "generates $108 billion in annual revenues". Fourteen of the family members were still billionaires in 2019. The "family reportedly keeps 80% of Cargill Inc.'s net income inside the company for reinvestment annually."

== Private lives and secrecy ==
A review of William Duncan MacMillan's 1998 book MacMillan: The American Grain Family, described the MacMillans as "one of Minnesota's wealthiest clans" and "one of its most doggedly secretive". MacMillan offers the closest look yet at the private lives behind the largest privately held company in the world.

== Five generations of the Cargill-MacMillan family ==
Cargill married Ellen "Ella" Theresa Stowell, and they had four children—William "Will" Samuel Cargill, Edna Clara Cargill (1871–1963), Emma Cargill, and Austen Cargill (died 1957)—the second generation of the Cargill family.

Will Cargill married Mary MacMillan.

Edna Clara Cargill (1871–1963) married John H. MacMillan Sr (1869–1940). Edna and John H. MacMillan Sr had two sons and a daughter—John H. MacMillan Jr, Cargill MacMillan Sr (1900–1968), and Emma Cargill married Fred M. Hanchette.

Austen Cargill (died 1957) married Anne Ray.

The third generation included the four children of Edna and John H. MacMillan Sr (1869–1940)—John H. MacMillan Jr (1895–1960) and his wife Marion Dickson (1892–1980)—John Hugh MacMillan III (1928–2008), Whitney Duncan MacMillan (1930–2006), and Marion MacMillan Pictet (1930–2009), who had a daughter, Gwendolyn Sontheim Meyer who had two children.

The four children of their second oldest son, Cargill MacMillan Sr (1900–1968) and his wife Pauline Whitney (1900–1990) are also third generation—Cargill MacMillan Jr (1927–2011), Whitney MacMillan (1929-2020), Alice Whitney MacMillan (1932–1932), and Pauline MacMillan Keinath (born 1934 in Hennepin County, Minnesota). Whitney MacMillan (1929 – 2020)—Cargill MacMillan Sr's second oldest son—led the company from 1976 to 1995.

Their oldest son, Cargill MacMillan Jr (born Hennepin County, Minnesota, March 29, 1927 – November 14, 2011) and his wife had four children.

The third generation also includes the daughter and son of Austen Cargill and Anne Ray. Their daughter, Margaret Anne Cargill (1920–2006), who never married, was a philanthropist. The fourth generation includes the two sons and daughter of James R. Cargill (1923–2006) and his wife Mary Janet Morse Cargill (died February 5, 2010). James died in 2006 and his widow died in 2010, had lived in her hometown, Minneapolis, Minnesota. She was on the list of billionaires in 2010. The two children of their oldest son, James R. (Susan) Cargill II (born 1949), whose hometown was Birchwood, Wisconsin are part of the fourth generation.

Their second son, Austen S. Cargill II (born 1951), who lives in Livingston, Montana, has two children. He attended Oregon State University and University of Minnesota.

His daughter, a fourth generation member, Marianne Cargill Liebmann (born 1953) married Steve Liebmann. Their son, Andrew C. Liebmann, is currently on the Cargill board of directors. Marianne Liebmann studied at Montana State University, where she received a Bachelor of Arts degree.

By 2016, the fifth generation of the Cargill family was represented on Cargill Inc's board of directors—Andrew Cargill Liebmann and Richard Cargill. Non-family Cargill CEO David MacLennan has taken the "next-generation family members on tours of the company's facilities and answers family members' questions weekly. Neither of the new board members, who were both in their mid-thirties, have ever worked for the company, but "they have taken corporate governance courses". In 2014, 34-year-old astrophysicist, Andrew Cargill Liebmann—the son of Marianne Cargill Liebmann—replaced his uncle who had retired from the board. Liebman's mentorship included a tour of the company's interests in India, China and Singapore. Richard Cargill was also appointed to the Cargill board of directors to replace a retired Cargill relative. MacLennan, who had made major changes to Cargill Inc, also moved the company's headquarters from the 85-year-old lakeside offices in a mansion by a lake in Wayzata, Minnesota to more "mundane" office space nearby.

== Forbes wealth rankings ==
The Cargill-MacMillan family is the fourth richest family in the United States on Forbes' list. In 2016 their revenue was estimated at USD$49 billion, and $113.5 billion in 2019.

By 2019, Cargill Inc had been listed as America's largest private company since 1986, in all but two years that Forbes has maintained the list.

W. Duncan MacMillan, and James and Margaret Cargill died in 2006. In an article entitled, "The Richest People You've Never Heard Of", Forbes estimated that the fortunes of the MacMillans were worth $1.2 billion each, and that of James and Margaret Cargill were estimated at $1.8 billion each.

John Hugh MacMillan III (1928–2008), who worked for Cargill Inc for 35 years, from 1955 until his retirement in 1990 and served on the board of directors for many years, was on the 2007 Forbes list of billionaires, with an estimated net worth of $1.7 billion.

Four members of the Cargill family ranked 220 on "The 400 Richest Americans 2009" list, each with a net worth of $1.6 billion. Their fortunes were all listed as "inherited". Mary Janet Morse Cargill (85), who lived in Minneapolis, was the widow of James R. Cargill (1923–2006) of the second generation. The three others are third generation—Austen S. Cargill II (58) in Livingston, Montana, James R. Cargill II (60) Birchwood, and Marianne Cargill Liebmann (56) in Bozeman. Three of Cargill MacMillan Sr's four children Whitney MacMillan, Alice Whitney MacMillan, and Pauline MacMillan Keinath (born 1934 in Hennepin County, Minnesota), were on "The 400 Richest Americans 2009" with a listed revenue of $4.3 billion each. Marion MacMillan Pictet was also included on the list with an inherited fortune of $4.3 billion.

Marianne Cargill Liebmann's net worth was $3.1 billion in 2020. In 2009, Forbes listed the net worth of Cargill MacMillan Jr at an estimated $4.3 billion. MacMillan Jr, who was a "longtime" member of Cargill Inc board of directors, had "no day-to-day role in the company".

Cargill heiress Marion MacMillan Pictet (1932–2009) ranked #176 on Forbes list in 2010 with a net worth of $4.5 billion, an increase over $4.3 in 2009. The net worth of her daughter, Gwendolyn Sontheim Meyer (born 1961/62), the great-great-granddaughter of William W. Cargill, was $4.4 billion in 2020, placing her #680 on the richest people in the United States in 2020. Sontheim Meyer's inheritance represented an "estimated 7% stake in food giant Cargill."

== Philanthropy ==
Margaret Anne Cargill, a fourth generation member of the Cargill family, who died in 2006, had bequeathed her shares of the "Minnesota-based food, agriculture and fertilizer conglomerate" Cargill Inc worth about $6 billion to two non-profits—the Anne Ray Charitable Trust and the Margaret A. Cargill Foundation. For many years the charities could not access the funds because it would mean liquidating "private Cargill stock". When Cargill sold its 64-percent stakes in Mosaic in 2011, the two nonprofits exchanged the private Cargill stock for 114.5 million shares of the public Mosaic stock. When all of these Mosaic shares are finally sold, the two charities could become "two of the wealthiest grant makers in the United States." In 2012 Margaret Anne Cargill posthumously earned the #1 spot in The Chronicle of Philanthropy's annual list of America's 50 most generous donors, beating George Soros, Michael Bloomberg and Paul Allen. In announcing the winner Forbes said that "Not only is she almost entirely unknown, but the heiress to the Cargill agribusiness fortune passed away in 2006."
