= Andrew C. Liebmann =

American heir

Andrew Cargill Liebmann
- Born: Andrew Cargill; June 8, 1979 (age 46)
- Education: Montana State University
- Known for: Cargill heir
- Parent: Marianne Cargill Liebmann (mother)
- Relatives: Austen S. Cargill II and James R. Cargill II (uncles)

Andrew Liebmann (born June 8, 1979) is an American heir.

== Biography ==
He has a PhD in astrophysics and is a former member of the Cargill board of directors. He was a graduate student at Montana State University. and was appointed to the board of directors in 2014 without previously having worked for the company. He is the son of Cargill heir Marianne Cargill Liebmann, who owns 1/18 of the Cargill family fortune.
