= Mars (surname) =

Mars is a surname. Notable people with the surname include:

- Mademoiselle Mars, stage name of French actress Anne Salvetat (1779–1847)
- Adam Mars (born 1981), American artist
- Alastair Mars (1915–1985), British World War II submarine commander and author
- Alexandre Mars (born 1976), French businessman and philanthropist
- Betty Mars (1944–1989), French singer and actress
- Bruno Mars (born 1985), American singer-songwriter
- Chris Mars, American musician and painter
- Dwayne Mars (born 1989), Barbadian footballer
- Ed Mars (1866–1941), American baseball player
- Ethel V. Mars (1884–1945), American businesswoman and racehorse owner
- Florence Mars (1923–2006), American civil rights activist and author
- Forrest Mars Sr. (1904–1999), American confectionery magnate
- Forrest Mars Jr. (1931–2016), American confectionery magnate, son of the above and grandson of the below
- Franklin Clarence Mars (1883–1934), American confectionery magnate
- Gerald Mars (born 1933), British social anthropologist
- Hans-Joachim Mars (born 1926), German sports shooter
- Jacqueline Mars (born 1939), American confectionery magnate
- James Mars (1790–1880), American slave narrative author
- James C. Mars (1876–1944), American aviation pioneer
- John Mars, Canadian singer, songwriter, and percussionist
- John Franklyn Mars (born 1935), American confectionery magnate
- Johnny Mars (born 1942), American harmonica player, singer, and songwriter
- Kenneth Mars (1935–2011), American actor
- Kettly Mars (born 1958), Haitian poet and novelist
- Marijke Mars (born 1965), American billionaire heiress and businesswoman
- Melissa Mars (born 1979), French singer and actress
- Mick Mars, American lead guitarist for Mötley Crüe
- Roman Mars, American podcaster
- Tommy Mars (1951–2026), American keyboard player

== See also ==
- Mars (disambiguation) § Fictional entities for fictional characters surnamed Mars
- Commander Mars (disambiguation)
