= Forrest Mars =

Forrest Mars may refer to:

- Forrest Mars, Sr. (1904–1999), American businessman and one-time head of Mars, Incorporated
- Forrest Mars, Jr. (1931–2016), his son

== See also ==
- Mars (surname)
- Mars (disambiguation)
