= John McMillan =

John McMillan, MacMillan or Macmillan may refer to:

== Politics ==
- John McMillan (Alabama politician) (born 1941), American politician in Alabama
- John McMillan (New Brunswick politician) (1816–1886), New Brunswick businessman and politician
- John McMillan (Ontario politician) (1824–1901), Ontario farmer and politician
- John McMillan (Prince Edward Island politician) (1851–1927), farmer and politician on Prince Edward Island
- Alex McMillan (John Alexander McMillan III, born 1932), U.S. congressman from North Carolina
- John Angus McMillan (1874–1922), Ontario merchant and politician
- John Angus MacMillan (1889–1956), member of the House of Commons of Canada, earlier member of the Legislative Assembly of Saskatchewan
- John L. McMillan (1898–1979), U.S. congressman from South Carolina
- John McMillan (public servant) (born 1949), Australian information commissioner and professor

== Sports ==
- Johnny McMillan (1871–1941), Scottish football player and manager
- John D. McMillan (1919–1981), head football coach for the Citadel Bulldogs
- John McMillan (Australian footballer) (1938–2017), Australian rules footballer for St Kilda
- John MacMillan (rower) (1928–2006), British rower at the 1952 Summer Olympics – coxed four
- John MacMillan (British Army officer) (born 1932), British general and rower at the 1952 Summer Olympics – double sculls
- John McMillan (footballer, born 1937), Scottish footballer
- John MacMillan (ice hockey) (born 1935), Canadian ice hockey player

== Other ==
- John McMillan (Salvation Army officer) (1874–1939), 5th Chief of the Staff of The Salvation Army
- John McMillan (diplomat) (born 1914), Australian diplomat
- John McMillan (economist) (1951–2007), professor of economics
- John McMillan (missionary) (1752–1833), Presbyterian pastor and educator
- John H. MacMillan (1895–1960), president of Cargill, 1936–60
- John H. MacMillan Sr. (1869–1944), American businessman, president of Cargill, 1909–36
- John Hugh MacMillan (1928–2008), American billionaire businessman
- John Mark McMillan (born 1979), American Christian musician
- John Macmillan (actor), British actor
- John Macmillan (bishop) (1877–1956), bishop

== See also ==
- John M'Millan (c. 1669–1753) sometimes spelled McMillan or Macmillan, dissenter and founder of the Reformed Presbytery
