= James Cargill (disambiguation) =

James Cargill or variant may refer to:

- Jimmy Cargill or James Cargill (1914–1939), Scottish soccer player
- James Cargill, British bass guitarist for Birmingham rock band Broadcast
- James R. Cargill (1923–2006), American businessman
- James R. Cargill II (born 1949), American businessman

== See also ==
- James (disambiguation)
- Cargill (disambiguation)
