= Margaret Anne Cargill =

American philanthropist (1920–2006)

- Born: September 24, 1920; Los Angeles, California, U.S.
- Died: August 1, 2006 (aged 85); La Jolla, California, U.S.
- Education: University of Minnesota
- Occupation: Philanthropist
- Parents: Austen Cargill; Anne Ray Cargill
- Relatives: James R. Cargill (brother)
- Family: Cargill family

Margaret Anne Cargill (September 24, 1920 – August 1, 2006) was an American philanthropist and heiress to part of the Cargill fortune.

== Biography ==
=== Early life ===
Margaret Anne Cargill was born September 24, 1920, in Los Angeles, the daughter of Austen Cargill and granddaughter of W. W. Cargill. She grew up in the Midwest. She earned a degree in arts education from the University of Minnesota and moved to Southern California.

=== Philanthropy ===
She became one of eight heirs to the Minneapolis-based grain-trading conglomerate Cargill. Forbes magazine listed her in 2005 as the 164th-richest American, with a net worth of $1.8 billion. She was a major donor to the American Red Cross, the Nature Conservancy, the Smithsonian Institution's National Museum of the American Indian and the American Swedish Institute. She gave away more than $200 million, always anonymously.

Cargill established the Anne Ray Charitable Trust. The trust provides grants for charitable and educational programs and scholarships. She provided that, after her death, the Margaret A. Cargill Philanthropies would use her wealth for charitable purposes. The combined assets of the Margaret A. Cargill Foundation and Anne Ray Foundation make it among the top ten foundations in the United States with assets in excess of $9.2 billion.

=== Death ===
She died from complications of chronic obstructive pulmonary disease on August 1, 2006, at her home in La Jolla, San Diego, California.

== See also ==
- James R. Cargill
- List of billionaires (2004)
