= John McMillin =

John McMillin may refer to:

- John S. McMillin, American lawyer, businessman and political figure
- John Ernest McMillin, member of the Canadian Parliament

== See also ==
- John McMillan (disambiguation)
