= Marion MacMillan Pictet =

- Born: October 17, 1932; Minneapolis, Minnesota
- Died: August 30, 2009 (aged 76); Lyford Cay, Bahamas
- Occupation: Heiress
- Children: Gwendolyn Sontheim Meyer
- Parent: John H. MacMillan
- Relatives: William Wallace Cargill (great-grandfather); John Hugh MacMillan (brother); Whitney Duncan MacMillan (brother)

Marion Hamilton MacMillan Pictet (October 17, 1932 - August 30, 2009) was an American heiress.

She was a great-granddaughter of William Wallace Cargill, the founder of Cargill. Her father was John H. MacMillan She had two brothers John Hugh MacMillan and Whitney Duncan MacMillan.

She lived in Hamilton, Bermuda, and she was divorced. In 2010, her estate was estimated to be worth approximately US$4.5 billion. She died in The Bahamas in August 2009.

Her only daughter, Gwendolyn Sontheim Meyer, is an equestrian.
