= James R. Cargill =

American billionaire heir and businessman

- Born: James Ray Cargill; October 9, 1923; Chicago, Illinois, US
- Died: March 26, 2006 (aged 82); Edina, Minnesota, US
- Education: Lake Forest Academy; University of Minnesota
- Occupation: Businessman
- Spouse: Mary Janet Cargill
- Children: James II; Austen II; Marianne
- Parents: Austen Cargill; Anne Ray Cargill
- Relatives: Margaret Anne Cargill (sister)
- Family: Cargill family

James Ray Cargill (October 9, 1923 – March 26, 2006) was an American billionaire heir and businessman.

== Early life ==
James Ray Cargill was born on October 9, 1923, in Chicago, Illinois. His father was Austen Cargill and his mother, Anne Ray Cargill. His grandfather, William Wallace Cargill, was the founder of Cargill, an agribusiness corporation.

He grew up in Minneapolis, Minnesota. He was educated at the Lake Forest Academy in Lake Forest, Illinois. He also worked at Cargill during the summers of 1939 through 1941. He served in the United States Army in Europe for three years during World War II. He graduated from the University of Minnesota.

== Career ==
In 1947, he started his career at Cargill, working in advertising. By 1989, he retired as senior vice president of Cargill. He served on its board of directors from 1963 to 1995. He was a major shareholder of Cargill.

In 1992, he acquired J. B. Hudson Jewelers, a retailer of jewelry, china and crystals.

He was worth $1.8 billion in 2006.

== Philanthropy ==
He donated to his alma mater, the University of Minnesota, from which he was a recipient of the Distinguished Service Award. He established Dinnaken Properties, student residences which were affordable yet good quality, at UM.

He was a donor to Ducks Unlimited and Trout Unlimited.

== Personal life ==
He married Mary Janet Cargill. They had three children:

- James R. Cargill II
- Austen S. Cargill II
- Marianne Cargill Liebmann

== Death ==
He died on March 26, 2006, in Edina, Minnesota.

== Legacy ==
Each of his children inherited a 1/18 share of Cargill.
