= William Cargill =

William Cargill may refer to:

- William Cargill (Berwick MP) (1813–1894; William Walter Cargill), Conservative Party politician
- William Cargill (New Zealand politician) (1784–1860; William Walter Cargill), Scottish-born New Zealand settler and politician
- William Wallace Cargill (1844–1909), American business executive and founder of Cargill, Inc

== See also ==
- Cargill (surname)
