= Mars family =

American family descended from the founders of Mars Inc.

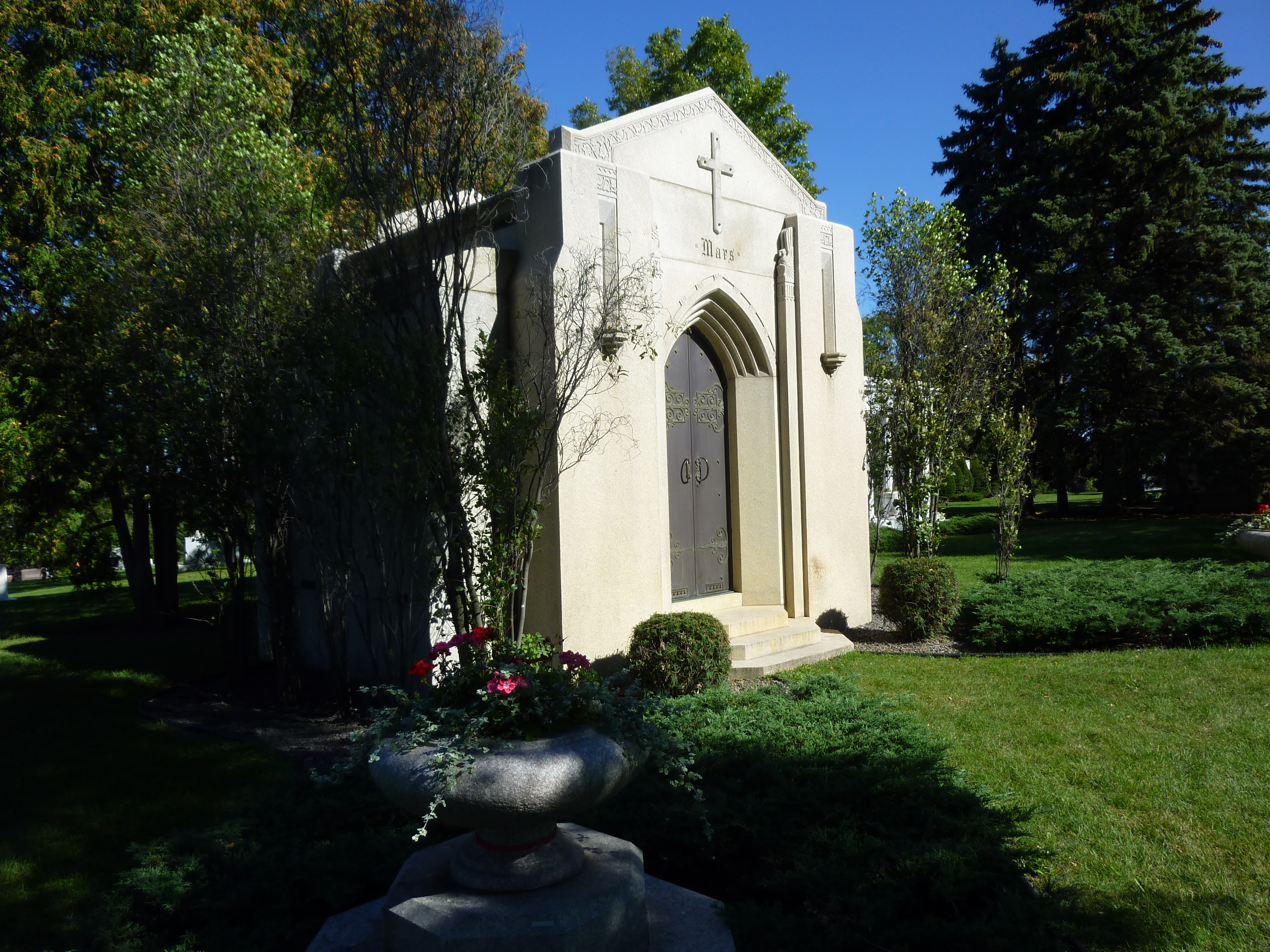
Private mausoleum in Lakewood Cemetery in Minneapolis

The Mars family is an American family that owns the confectionery, petcare, and food company Mars Inc. In 1988, the family was ranked as the richest family in the United States of America by Fortune magazine. It has been surpassed by the Walton family and the Koch family, but often continues to rank among the top three richest families in the U.S.

Husband and wife Frank C. Mars and Ethel G. Kissack, circa 1902

Upon the 1 July 1999 death of Forrest Mars Sr., he and his two sons were ranked No. 29, 30, and 31 by Forbes magazine's list of richest Americans, and they each had a worth of approximately $4 billion. In March 2010 the three children of Forrest Mars were tied for 52nd place amongst the world's richest people, according to Forbes, with a net worth of US$11 billion each. One of these sons, Forrest Mars Jr., died on 26 July 2016, and his four daughters inherited his wealth, with three of them working for the company as of 2019. As of April 2020, the combined private fortune of the family members was estimated at around $126 billion, making them one of the richest families in the world.

A 2006 report quantified how the Mars family was among 18 billionaire families, starting in the 1990s, who continuously lobbied Congress to eliminate the estate tax.

== Family members ==
Mars family tree
- Franklin Clarence Mars (September 24, 1883 – April 8, 1935) – founder of Mars, Inc. Invented the Milky Way bar.
  - Ethel G. Kissack (September 29, 1882 – April 11, 1980) – first wife of Frank C. Mars (married 1902, divorced)
    - Forrest Edward Mars Sr. (March 21, 1904 – July 1, 1999) – son of Frank C. Mars and Ethel G. Mars. Invented M&M's.
      - Audrey Ruth Meyer (May 25, 1910 – June 15, 1989) – wife of Forrest E. Mars Sr.
        - Forrest E. Mars Jr. (August 16, 1931 – July 26, 2016) – son of Forrest E. Mars Sr.
          - Virginia Cretella (born 1929/1930) – first wife of Forrest E. Mars Jr. (divorced 1990)
            - Victoria B. Mars – daughter of Forrest E. Mars Jr. and Virginia C. Mars
            - Valerie Anne Mars – daughter of Forrest E. Mars Jr. and Virginia C. Mars, member of the Board of Directors of Conservation International
              - Philip Michael White – husband of Valerie Anne Mars (married 1984)
            - Pamela D. Mars-Wright (born Pamela Diane Mars, 1960/1961) daughter of Forrest E. Mars Jr. and Virginia C. Mars
              - Lonnie Jay Wright (born 1960/1961) – husband of Pamela Diane Mars (married 1992)
            - Marijke Elizabeth Mars (born 1965) – daughter of Forrest E. Mars Jr. and Virginia C. Mars
              - Stephen J. Doyle – husband of Marijke Elizabeth Mars (married 1991) (divorced 2000)
          - Deborah Adair Clarke – second wife of Forrest E. Mars Jr. (divorced 2010)
        - John Franklyn Mars (born October 15, 1935) – son of Forrest E. Mars Sr.
          - Adrienne Bevis – wife of John Mars (married June 1958)
            - Linda Anne Mars (born May 23, 1960) – daughter of John and Adrienne Mars
            - Frank Edward Mars (born March 13, 1963) – son of John and Adrienne Mars
              - Susan Alleman Mars – wife of Frank E. Mars
            - Michael John Mars (born November 22, 1967) – son of John and Adrienne Mars
              - Sarah Ann Robbins (born April 19, 1968) – wife of Michael John Mars (married 1993)
        - Jacqueline Mars (born October 10, 1939) – daughter of Forrest E. Mars Sr.
          - David H. Badger – first husband of Jacqueline Mars (married 1961, divorced 1984)
            - Alexandra B. Airth (born Alexandra Badger, 1966/1967) – daughter of Jacqueline Mars and David Badger
              - Andrew Towne Carey (born 1966/1967) – husband of Alexandra Mars Badger (married 1991) (divorced 1995)
              - Alan Airth – husband of Alexandra Badger
            - Stephen M. Badger (born September 18, 1968) – son of Jacqueline Mars and David Badger
            - Christa M. Badger (born c.1975) – daughter of Jacqueline Mars and David Badger
          - Harold 'Hank' Vogel – second husband of Jacqueline Mars (married 1986, divorced in 1994)
  - Ethel Veronica Healy (1884 – December 20, 1945) – second wife of Frank C. Mars (married 1910, widowed 1934), president of Mars Candy Company, Chicago, after death of husband
    - Patricia Mars (1914–1965) – daughter of Frank C. Mars and Ethel V. Healy
      - William Furst – husband of Patricia Mars
      - Alan Feeney – husband of Patricia Mars
