= Valerie Mars =

American billionaire heiress (born 1959)

- Born: 20 January 1959 (age 67)
- Education: Yale University; Columbia University
- Occupation: Businesswoman
- Spouse: Philip Michael White
- Family: Mars family

Valerie Anne Mars (born 20 January 1959) is an American billionaire heiress and businesswoman. As of June 2021, Bloomberg Billionaires Index estimated her wealth to be $11.5 billion.

Valerie Mars is a fourth generation member of the Mars family. Her father was late Forrest Mars Jr. (1931–2016). She has three sisters: Marijke Mars, Pamela Mars-Wright and Victoria B. Mars. She inherited about 8 percent stake of Mars Inc. in 2016, which made her a billionaire.

She earned a bachelor's degree from Yale University and an MBA from Columbia University. She is married to Philip Michael White (since 1984), and has two sons.

She is a senior vice president and head of corporate development for Mars, Inc. Since 2014 she has served as a board member of Fiat Chrysler Automobiles. She serves also as a board member of Ahlstrom-Munksjö, a Finnish-Swedish stock company (paper industry). She is member of the advisory board of Rabobank North America. Her participation in nonprofit organizations include board membership in Conservation International (nature protection) and the Open Space Institute (landscape protection, honorary trustee). In August 2025, she sued contractor Jim Bruss for $10 million, claiming she was scammed.
