= Erling Persson =

Swedish businessman

- Born: 21 January 1917; Borlänge, Sweden
- Died: 28 October 2002 (aged 85); Stockholm, Sweden
- Known for: Founder of H&M
- Children: Stefan Persson; Lottie Tham
- Relatives: Karl-Johan Persson (grandson); Charlotte Söderström (granddaughter); Tom Persson (grandson)

Erling Persson (21 January 1917 – 28 October 2002) was the founder of H&M (Hennes & Mauritz). He got the idea following a post-World War II trip to the United States: he was impressed by the country's efficient, high-volume stores.

He established the company in Västerås, Sweden, in 1947 selling women's clothing, calling it Hennes, Swedish for "hers." In 1968, Persson acquired the premises and inventory of a Stockholm hunting equipment store named Mauritz Widforss. In 1982, his son, Stefan Persson took over as the managing director, and he was the chairman of the board until 2020 when he was succeeded by his own son. The Persson family owns about 47% of the company and has a 74% voting rights. He died in Stockholm on 28 October 2002.
