= Gwendolyn Sontheim Meyer =

American heiress

- Born: 1961 or 1962 (age 64–65)
- Occupation: Equestrian
- Children: 2
- Parent: Marion MacMillan Pictet
- Relatives: William Wallace Cargill (great-great-grandfather); Whitney MacMillan (maternal uncle)

Gwendolyn Sontheim Meyer (born 1961/62) is an American billionaire heiress and equestrian.

== Biography ==
=== Early life ===
She is a great-great-granddaughter of William Wallace Cargill, the founder of Cargill. Her late mother was Marion MacMillan Pictet.

=== Career ===
A show jumper, she won the Prix Credit Suisse at the Geneva International Horse Show in 2011. She also sponsors dressage.

=== Personal life ===
She lives in Rancho Santa Fe, California. She is divorced and has two children. As of February 2026, she was estimated to be worth approximately US$5.6 billion.
