= Charlotte Söderström =

Swedish billionaire (born 1977)

- Born: Charlotte Persson; 1977 (age 48–49)
- Citizenship: Swedish
- Spouse: married
- Children: 3
- Parent(s): Stefan Persson; Pamela Collett
- Relatives: Erling Persson (grandfather); Karl-Johan Persson (brother); Tom Persson (brother); Lottie Tham (aunt)

Charlotte Söderström (born 1977) is a Swedish billionaire. She is an heir of the fashion company Hennes & Mauritz (H&M), which was founded by her grandfather Erling Persson in 1947. As of December 2023, her net worth is estimated at US$1.8 billion.

== Early life ==
Charlotte Söderström grew up in Djursholm, Sweden, as the middle child of Stefan Persson and the photographer Pamela Persson, née Collett-Larson. She is the sister of Karl-Johan Persson and Tom Persson and the granddaughter of H&M founder Erling Persson.

== Career ==
Charlotte Söderström runs Stud Arch together with her mother Pamela Persson and works part-time with sponsorship within H&M. She is the owner of the horses H&M Indiana and H&M All In, which together with riders Malin Baryard-Johansson and Peder Fredricsson won Olympic gold in team jumping in Tokyo 2021.

== Personal life ==
She is married, has three children and lives in Stockholm.
