= Tom Persson =

Swedish billionaire businessman (born 1985)

- Born: 15 May 1985 (age 41)
- Citizenship: Swedish
- Education: Met Film School
- Spouse: Sofia Strandman (m. 2016)
- Parent(s): Stefan Persson; Pamela Collett
- Relatives: Erling Persson (grandfather); Karl-Johan Persson (brother); Charlotte Söderström (sister); Lottie Tham (aunt)

Tom Stefan Persson (born 15 May 1985) is a Swedish billionaire businessman, who works in the film industry. He is an heir of the fashion company Hennes & Mauritz (H&M), which was founded by his grandfather Erling Persson in 1947. On the Forbes 2019 list of the world's billionaires, he was ranked #1300 with a net worth of US$1.9 billion.

== Early life ==
Tom Persson grew up in Djursholm as the youngest child of Stefan Persson and Pamela Persson, née Collett-Larson, and is the younger brother of Karl-Johan Persson and Charlotte Söderström. Tom Persson attended and graduated from the Met Film School in London.

== Career ==
He works in the film industry as a producer, producing two films in 2017. Tom Persson's company CoMade started its operations in 2016 within film and media.

== Personal life ==
In May 2016, he married his long-term girlfriend, Swedish-born Sofia Strandman, at the family estate in Ramsbury, England.
