= Lottie Tham =

Swedish heiress and businesswoman

- Born: Helga Liselott Persson; 18 April 1949 (age 77)
- Occupation: Businesswoman
- Spouse: Pieter Tham
- Children: 2
- Parent(s): Erling Persson; Margrit Persson
- Relatives: Stefan Persson (brother); Karl-Johan Persson (nephew); Charlotte Söderström (niece); Tom Persson (nephew)

Helga Liselott "Lottie" Tham (born 18 April 1949) is a Swedish heiress and businesswoman, owner of over 5% of the fashion retail chain H&M.

== Early life ==
She was born Helga Liselott Persson, the daughter of Erling Persson, the founder of H&M.

== Career ==
Tham is the second largest shareholder in H&M and holds 5.32% of the shares; her brother Stefan Persson has 37.69%.

According to Forbes, Tham has a net worth of $2.1 billion, as of May 2020.

== Personal life ==
She is married to Swedish financial journalist and financier Pieter Tham; they live in Stockholm, Sweden, and have one son and a daughter.
