= Forrest Mars Jr. =

American businessman (1931–2016)

- Born: August 16, 1931; Oak Park, Illinois, US
- Died: July 26, 2016 (aged 84); Seattle, Washington, US
- Education: Hotchkiss School; Yale University (BS); New York University (MBA)
- Known for: Mars Inc.
- Spouse(s): Virginia Cretella (div. 1990) Deborah Adair Clarke (div. in early 2010); Jacomien Ford
- Family: Mars family

Forrest Edward Mars Jr. (August 16, 1931 – July 26, 2016) was an American heir and businessman. He was the eldest son of Audrey Ruth (Meyer) and Forrest Mars Sr., and the grandson of Franklin Clarence Mars, the founder of Mars Inc. He served as co-president of the confectionery company from 1975 to 1999.

In March 2015, Forbes estimated his wealth to be $26.8 billion up from US$11 billion in March 2010. In October 2012, the Bloomberg Billionaires List ranked Mars as the 31st richest man in the world with an estimated net worth of $20.1 billion.

== Early life ==
Mars graduated from the Hotchkiss School in Lakeville, Connecticut, in 1949 and Yale University. He served as a finance officer in the United States Army.

== Career ==
Mars started working for his family company in 1959, first as a financial officer. He was soon appointed the General Manager of a new factory in the Netherlands, then in 1966 he became the Managing Director of Mars France. He returned to the United States in 1970 to become Group Vice President of Mars Inc. In 1975, he and his brother John F. Mars became Co-Presidents and oversaw substantial growth of the company. Mars Jr retired in 1999 but remained on the Board of Directors until 2006.

== Public activities ==
As owner of the Diamond Cross Ranch, an 82,000-acre (33,000 ha) parcel along Montana's Tongue River and on the northern end of the Powder River Basin, Mars was active in opposing the development of his part of what's been called the "most productive coal and natural gas fields in the nation." Companies that hold the oil and gas leases to his land, rights originally made possible by the Stock-Raising Homestead Act and the Mineral Leasing Act, are seeking to exercise those rights on his ranch. Mars was reportedly concerned about the large amount of water that energy exploration and production projects consume, water needed by his ranch.

Mars and his ex-wife donated the funds that made it possible for the Colonial Williamsburg Foundation to reconstruct an 18th-century coffeehouse in Colonial Williamsburg.

The ex-couple made significant contributions to the privately owned governing body for Fort Ticonderoga, though a falling-out between Executive Director Nicholas Westbrook and Mrs. Mars led to her resignation from the board and the end of the then-couple's financial support.

== Wealth ==
According to Forbes magazine as of 2010, he was the 52nd richest person in the world, the 26th richest American, and the richest Virginian.

== Family ==
Mars married Virginia Cretella, born 1929 or 1930 (age 96–97). They had four daughters: Victoria B. Mars, Valerie Anne Mars, Pamela Diane Mars, and Marijke Elizabeth Mars. Each daughter was worth of $5.9 billion (as of March 2018).

He divorced Virginia in 1990 to marry Deborah Adair Clarke. They divorced in 2010.

== Death ==
Mars died at age 84 on July 26, 2016, in Seattle, of complications from a heart attack.
