= Dwayne Mars =

Barbadian footballer (born 1989)

Personal information
- Date of birth: 9 February 1989 (age 37)
- Place of birth: Saint Michael, Barbados
- Position: Striker

Team information
- Current team: Notre Dame SC

College career
| Years | Team | Apps | (Gls) |
| 2007–2010 | Quinnipiac Bobcats | | |

Senior career*
| Years | Team | Apps | (Gls) |
| 2011– | Notre Dame SC | | |

International career^{‡}
- Barbados U17
- Barbados U20
| 2011– | Barbados | 2 | (0) |
- * Club domestic league appearances and goals as of 15 September 2011 ‡ National team caps and goals as of 15 September 2011

Dwayne Mars (born 9 February 1989) is a Barbadian international footballer who plays for Notre Dame SC, as a striker.

== Career ==
Mars played college soccer at Quinnipiac University between 2007 and 2010, before signing for Notre Dame SC in 2011.

He made his international debut for Barbados in 2011, and has appeared in FIFA World Cup qualifying matches.
