= Wolfgang Marguerre =

German billionaire businessman

- Born: 1 January 1941 (age 85); Heidelberg, Germany
- Education: Heidelberg University; INSEAD
- Occupation: Businessman
- Title: Co-founder and chairman, Octapharma
- Spouse: Barbara Marguerre
- Children: 5

Wolfgang Marguerre (born 1941) is a German billionaire businessman, the chairman and owner of the Octapharma Group. The pharmaceutical company produces medicine derived from human proteins to treat haematology, immunotherapy, intensive care, and emergency medicine.

== Career ==
He founded Octapharma in 1983 with Robert Taub. Octapharma is owned by Marguerre and his three children, two of whom, Frederic Marguerre and Tobias Marguerre, sit on the management board.

As of 27 December 2020, Bloomberg estimated his net worth at US$5.23 billion.

== Background ==
Born in Germany in 1941, Marguerre was raised and educated in Heidelberg, where he read Political and Economic Science at Heidelberg University. He obtained his MBA at INSEAD in 1972. After which, he was managing director at Pharmaplast (division of A.P. Möller) for three years in Copenhagen, before moving to Baxter-Travenol Europe in Brussels as their director and business manager of Hyland-Division. In 1979, he became senior executive vice-president of the Revlon Healthcare Group in Paris, a role which he continued until 1983, when he founded Octapharma.

== Awards ==
In April 2009, Marguerre was awarded the Légion d’honneur, the highest decoration bestowed by France. In November 2011, he was awarded the Gold Decoration of Honour for Services to the Republic of Austria (Grosses Goldenes Ehrenzeichen).

== Philanthropy ==
Marguerre sponsors 70 children with bleeding disorders in India, Nepal, Romania and the Philippines through Octapharma's corporate sponsorship of Save One Life, an international non-profit organization that supports children and adults with blood disorders.

== Interests ==
Marguerre has played the violin since the age of six. A supporter of the arts, he helped to save the Heidelberg Theatre which had been threatened with closure. When the theatre was reopened in 2012, the newly built state-of-the-art stage was named the "Marguerre-Saal" (Marguerre Hall) in his honour. He also donated a significant sum to accept and integrate refugees in Heidelberg. Marguerre speaks five languages.
