= James R. Cargill II =

American business owner (born 1949)

- Born: James Ray Cargill II; 1949 (age 76–77)
- Occupations: Heir, Cargill
- Spouses: Susan Kelly (died 2010); Kathy (m. 2012)
- Children: 2
- Parents: James R. Cargill; Mary Janet Cargill
- Family: Cargill family

James Ray Cargill II (born 1949) is an American business owner.

== Biography ==
James R. Cargill II is the great-grandson of William Wallace Cargill, the founder of the privately held, globally operating, food corporation Cargill. He has a brother, Austen S. Cargill II, and a sister, Marianne Cargill Liebmann.

He sits on the Board of the Center of the American West at the University of Colorado at Boulder and on the Board of Trustees of the National Air and Space Museum of the Smithsonian Institution.

He has donated to the Walker Art Center and the Minneapolis Institute of Art in Minneapolis, Minnesota.

Through the James R. Cargill II Trust, he has owned stock in SolarAttic, a company that uses solar energy to heat swimming-pools.

He lives in Birchwood, Wisconsin and is married with two children. A widower, he married Kathy Cargill (née Pospychalla) in 2012. As of 2019, his estimated net worth is US$4.2 billion.
