= Erwin Kelm =

Erwin Kelm (1911 – 1994) was an American businessman born in Minnesota. He attended the University of Minnesota. While at the helm of Cargill from 1961 through 1976 he built the company into a $10 billion grain business which handled more than 25% of America's grain exports while operating 600 plants in 38 countries.
