= Pamela Mars-Wright =

American businesswoman and billionaire heiress

- Born: Pamela Diane Mars; 1960 (age 65–66)
- Education: Vassar College
- Occupation: Businesswoman
- Spouse: Lonnie Wright
- Family: Mars family

Pamela Diane Mars-Wright (née Mars; born 1960) is an American businesswoman and billionaire heiress. Previously, she was the chairman of the board of Mars Inc. She is a supervisory board member of Dutch brewing company Heineken International.

Mars-Wright is a fourth generation member of the Mars family. Her father was Forrest Mars Jr. (1931–2016). She has three sisters: Marijke Mars, Valerie Mars and Victoria B. Mars. She inherited about 8 percent stake of Mars Inc. in 2016, which made her a billionaire. According to Bloomberg Billionaires Index, her net worth was valued worth of $11.5 billion as of June 2021.

Mars-Wright attended the elite Foxcroft School for girls. Mars-Wright graduated (BA/BSc) from Vassar College. She has held several roles within Mars Inc. She started as an operations supervisor in 1986, then she became plant director manager at the company's petcare factory followed by a position as manufacturing director at Mars Australia. After a sabbatical she joined Mars Inc. as a member of the board of directors in 2001 and served also as the chairman of the board (2004–2008). She was a board member of Mars Inc. also in 2015 and was promoting sustainability. Today, she works as the family's ambassador to the Mars petcare division.

In 1992, she married Lonnie Wright, a plant manager, in Champaign, Illinois. She has three children.

== Additional links ==
- Pamela "Pam" Mars-Wright (bloomberg.com)
- Goodness, greatness, Mars (2014-7-15) (london.edu)
