= Günther Fielmann =

German billionaire businessman (1939–2024)

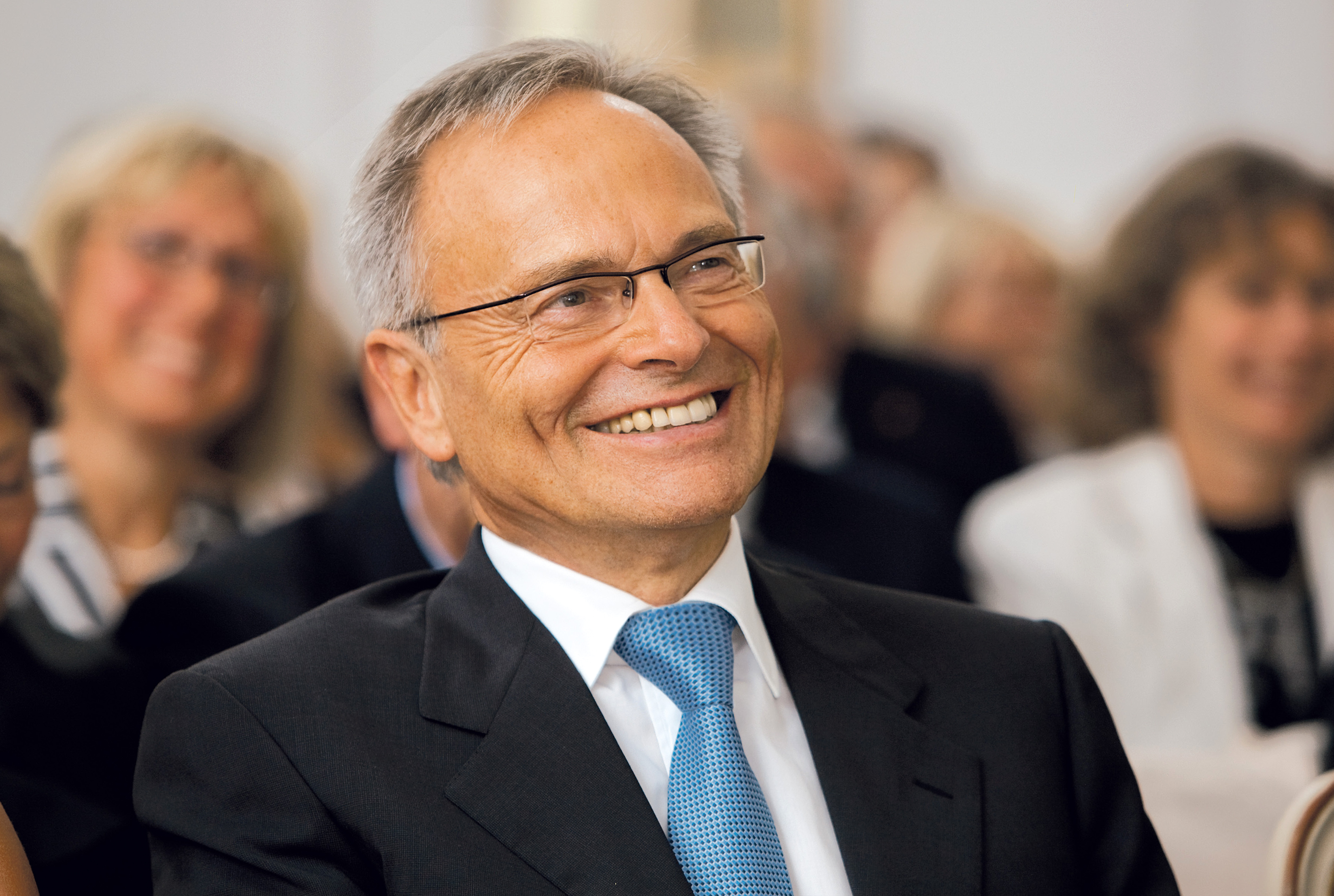
- Fielmann in 2009
- Born: Günther Klaus Fielmann; 17 September 1939; Stafstedt, Germany
- Died: 3 January 2024 (aged 84); Lütjensee, Schleswig-Holstein, Germany
- Occupations: Businessman; optometrist
- Known for: Founder and CEO, Fielmann Group
- Spouse: Heike Eggert (m. 1988; div. 2000)
- Children: 2, including Marc Fielmann

Günther Klaus Fielmann (17 September 1939 – 3 January 2024) was a German billionaire businessman, the founder, majority owner and the chief executive officer of Fielmann, a German optics company focusing on retail eyewear. At the time of his death, his net worth was estimated at US$4.6 billion. From 2019, the management of Fielmann Group, was handed over completely to his son Marc Fielmann.

== Early life ==
Günther Klaus Fielmann was born 17 September 1939, the second child of Dr. Wilhelm and Marie-Louise Fielmann. His father was a school principal. Initially, Fielmann wanted to become a photographer, but his father insisted and told him to start an apprenticeship as optometrist, which he did in 1956. In 1965, he became a diplomed optometrist and optometrist master.

== Career ==
1972 the state-approved optometrist opened his first shop in Cuxhaven. In 1981 he revolutionised the German spectacle market by offering 90 fashionable frames for the allowance of the statutory health insurance funds (initial tariff). Because previously only 6 models were available in exchange for the insurance allowance, Fielmann thus removed the social stigma of having to wear glasses. This liberalisation, favourable media coverage ("Robin Hood of spectacle wearers") and aggressive marketing allowed his business to grow rapidly. In 1982 a new shop was opened in Kiel offering more than 7,000 frames to choose from. In 1994 the Fielmann KG was transformed into Fielmann AG and went public.

In 2002, Fielmann bought Plön Castle from the state of Schleswig-Holstein and had it renovated extensively. Since 2003 he trained his optometrists in the castle. From 2005–06 onwards bachelor's and master's degrees in optometry are being offered in cooperation with the University of Applied Sciences Lübeck.

== Personal life ==
In 1988, Fielmann married Heike Fielmann (née Eggert; born 1968), who was a little less than thirty years his junior and whom he divorced in 2000. He has two children from this marriage;

- Marc Fielmann (born 1989), who is the CEO of Fielmann
- Sophie-Louise Fielmann (born 1994)

Günther Fielmann died in Lütjensee on 3 January 2024, at the age of 84.

== Other activities ==
For each of his employees Fielmann planted a tree every year. In May 2009 he planted the one-millionth tree with chancellor Angela Merkel and minister president Peter Harry Carstensen.

Fielmann was also a passionate organic farmer. He owned the 1,600 hectares manor Schierensee, the 470 hectares manor Marutendorf in Achterwehr, the 180 hectares farm Möglin in Krummwisch and a farm in Lütjensee. The organic products of his farms he sold under the brand Hof Lütjensee.

== Awards ==
In 2000 Fielmann received the Federal Cross of Merit First Class from the state of Schleswig-Holstein. Two years later (2002) the state also bestowed the title of a professor (honoris causis) upon him. In 2003 he received the "Deutscher Gründerpreis" (Prize for German Founders). The agricultural and nutrition sciences department of the University of Kiel awarded him an honorary doctorate in December 2004. In 2011 Fielmann was accepted into the Hall of Fame of manager magazin.
