= Fielmann AG =

German eyewear company

Fielmann Group AG
- Type: Aktiengesellschaft
- Traded as: FWB: FIE; SDAX
- ISIN: DE0005772206
- Industry: Retail, optician
- Founded: 1972
- Founder: Günther Fielmann
- Headquarters: Hamburg, Germany
- Number of locations: 1,262 (2025)
- Key people: Marc Fielmann (CEO), Mark K. Binz (Chairman of the Supervisory Board)
- Revenue: €2.44 billion (2025)
- Operating income: €291.7 million (2025)
- Net income: €205.5 million (2025)
- Number of employees: 23,807 (2025)
- Website: fielmann-group.com/en/

Fielmann Group AG is a German eyewear company.

Fielmann stock is listed in the German SDAX index. With 6% of all optical stores, Fielmann has achieved a 25% sales market share and a 57% market share in terms of units sold. Fielmann is the market leader in Germany and Europe's largest optician.

== History ==
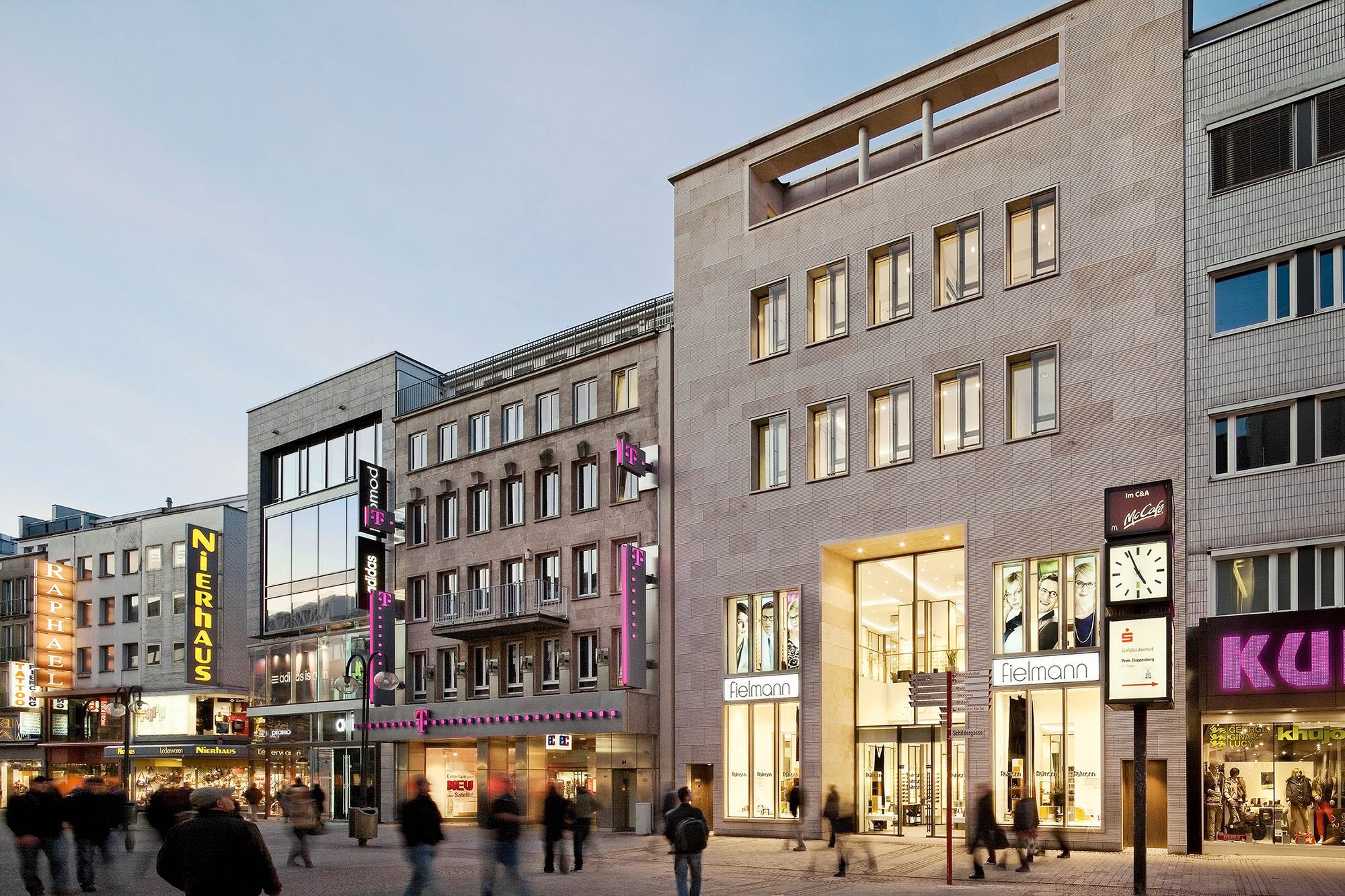
Fielmann store in Cologne

In 1972 Günther Fielmann established the first Fielmann store in Cuxhaven, Lower Saxony. In 1981, Fielmann negotiated an agreement with the Esens statutory health insurance company, which allowed a larger selection of frames to be added to the portfolio for patients with insurance coverage.

Fielmann has been listed on the German stock exchange since 1994. Its stock indexing advanced from a listing in the SDAX (small and medium-sized companies) to MDAX on 6 January 2009, but was relegated to SDAX in December 2019.

The non-profit Fielmann-Akademie was established by the company in 2001. Located in Plön Castle, Schleswig-Holstein it is a training centre for optometrists since 2002.

Since 2019, Marc Fielmann has been the sole CEO of the company, succeeding his father Günther Fielmann.

After almost 40 years on Weidestrasse, the Fielmann Group opened its new Head Office at Fuhlsbuettler Strasse in Hamburg's Barmbek-Nord district on September 1, 2025.

== Corporate affairs ==
Brands of Fielmann Group AG Fielmann Optika Clarus Óptica & Audiología Universitaria Medical Óptica Audición

The key trends of Fielmann are (as at the financial year ending December 31):

Year	Revenue (€ m)	Net income (€ m)	Employees
2017	1,386	168	18,522
2018	1,428	169	19,379
2019	1,521	172	20,397
2020	1,429	116	21,853
2021	1,678	137	22,028
2022	1,759	104	22,631
2023	1,970	128	23,412
2024	2,266	154	24,363
2025	2,435	205	23,832

== Other activities ==
Fielmann plants a tree for every employee every year. In 2009, chancellor Angela Merkel, minister-president Peter Harry Carstensen and Günther Fielmann planted the one-millionth tree in Büdelsdorf.
