= Karl-Johan Persson =

Swedish businessman

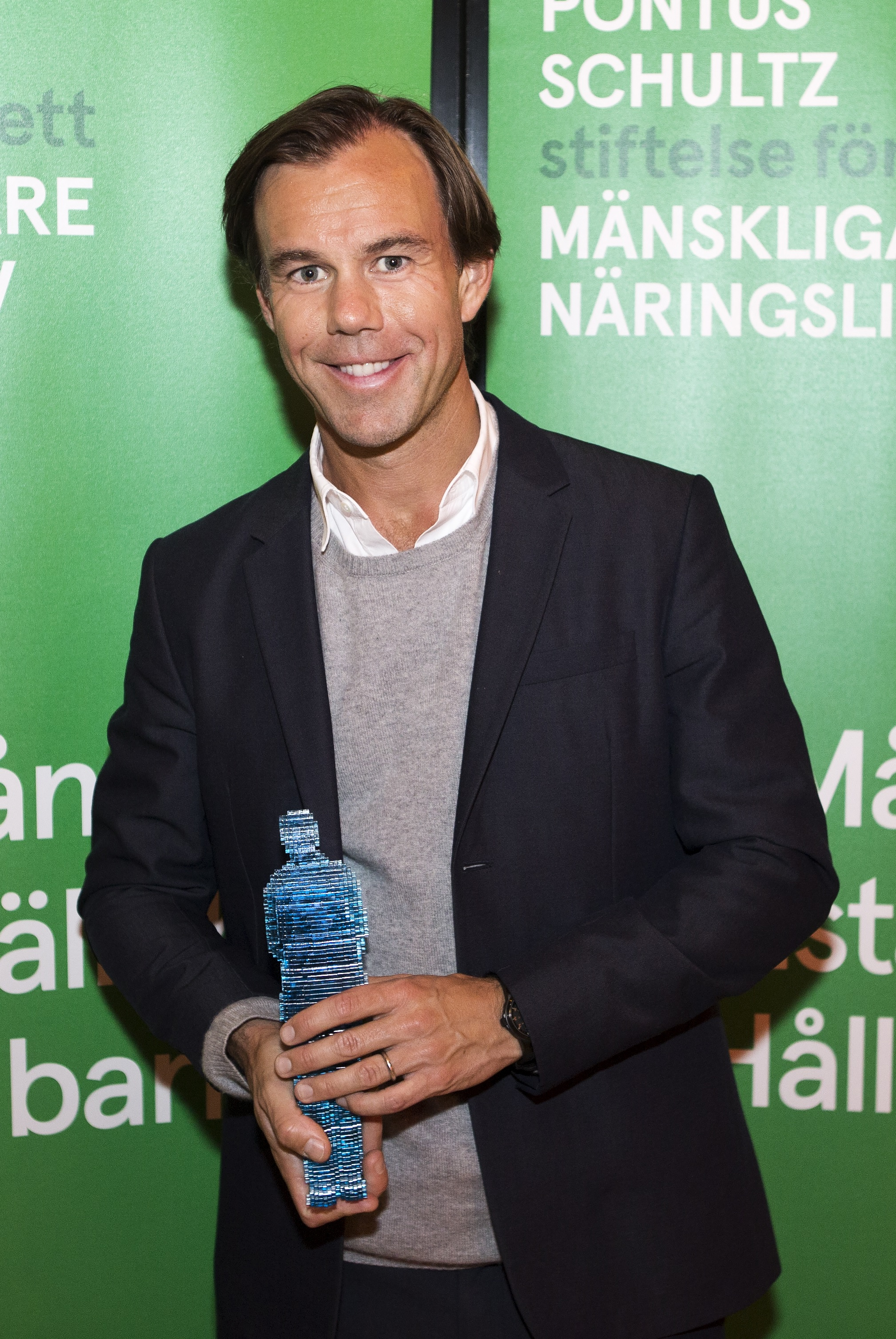
- Persson in 2014
- Born: 25 March 1975 (age 51)
- Citizenship: Swedish
- Education: European Business School
- Occupations: Chair, H&M
- Spouse: Leonie Gillberg
- Children: 3
- Parent(s): Stefan Persson; Pamela Collett
- Relatives: Erling Persson (grandfather); Tom Persson (brother); Charlotte Söderström (sister); Lottie Tham (aunt)

Karl-Johan Erling Göran Persson (born 25 March 1975) is a Swedish billionaire businessman. He is chairman of the fashion company Hennes & Mauritz (H&M), and was its CEO from 2009 to 2020. H&M was founded by his grandfather Erling Persson. As of December 2023, according to Forbes, his estimated net worth is US$1.9 billion.

== Early life ==
Persson attended the European Business School in London from 1996, majoring in Business and Economics. He graduated in 2002.

== Career ==
In 2001, Persson acquired an events management business, European Network, that went on to establish itself as the premier events management company in Scandinavia. Persson was the CEO of the company between 2001 and 2004. The business was successfully sold in 2007 to MCI. In 2005, he joined H&M in an operational role, working his way up to head of expansion and head of business development in 2007, before being appointed CEO in 2009 to succeed Rolf Eriksen. In 2020 he handed over the CEO role to Helena Helmersson and was elected Chair of the H&M board at the AGM in May 2020.

He invests in start-ups through the companies Philian AB and 41an Invest AB.

== Personal life ==
He is married to Leonie Gillberg, they have three children, and live in Stockholm, Sweden. Crown Princess Victoria of Sweden attended their wedding in 2002.
