= William Duncan MacMillan (businessman) =

W. Duncan MacMillan
- Born: William Duncan MacMillan; July 5, 1930
- Died: October 31, 2006 (aged 76); Jupiter, Florida, US
- Occupation: Businessman
- Title: Director of Cargill
- Spouse(s): Sarah Stevens (died 1995); Nivin
- Children: 4
- Parent(s): John H. MacMillan, Jr. Marion Dickson
- Relatives: John Hugh MacMillan (brother); Marion MacMillan Pictet (sister); William Wallace Cargill (great-grandfather); Beej Chaney (son-in-law)

William Duncan MacMillan (July 5, 1930 - October 31, 2006) was an American businessman. A longtime director of Cargill, he maintained a generally low profile. Forbes Magazine assessed him to be a billionaire by the 1970's

== Early life ==
He was born on July 5, 1930, the son of John H. MacMillan, Jr. and Marion Dickson. After graduating from the Berkshire School, he received his bachelors degree from Brown University in Providence, Rhode Island in 1953. He maintained his relationship with the university as a member of the board of trustees and with philanthropic gifts to fund scholarships and build the W. Duncan MacMillan Hall.

== Career ==
MacMillan was a board member of Cargill for three decades. He wrote the MacMillan-Cargill family history and led several companies, some of which he established himself.

== Personal life ==
MacMillan married twice. His first wife, Sarah Stevens, died in 1995. They had four daughters, Sarah MacMillan of California, Katherine Tanner of Florida, and Lucy Stitzer and Alexandra Daitch, both of Connecticut, all of whom survived him. He was also survived by his second wife, Nivin, of Wayzata. His daughter Sarah was formerly married to Beej Chaney, lead singer of Minneapolis rock band The Suburbs.

== Death ==
MacMillan died on October 31, 2006 of an apparent heart attack at his winter home near Jupiter, Florida, aged 76.
