= Stefan Persson (magnate) =

Richest person in Sweden

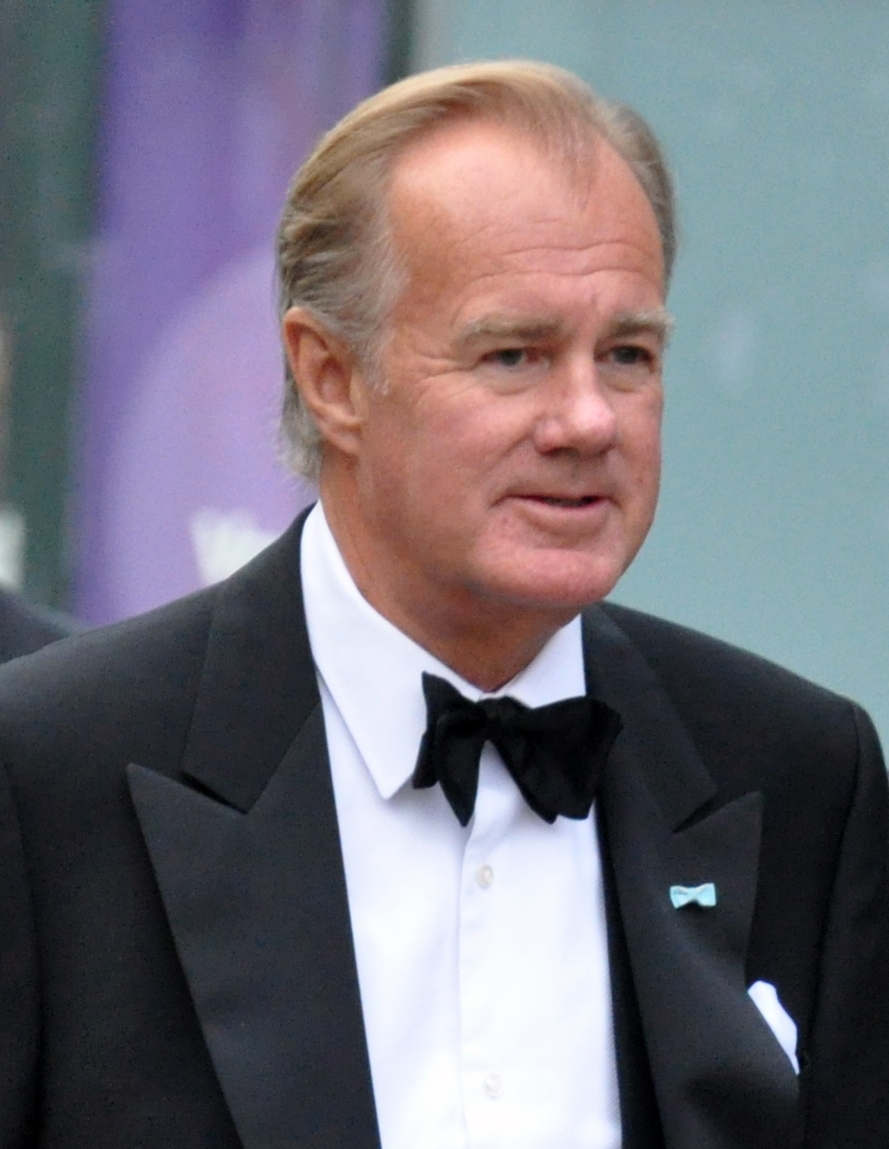
- Persson in 2010
- Born: 4 October 1947 (age 78); Stockholm, Sweden
- Education: Stockholm University
- Occupation: Business magnate
- Known for: 36% owner of H&M
- Title: Chairman, H&M
- Spouses: Pamela Collett; Carolyn Denise Florman
- Children: Karl-Johan Persson; Charlotte Söderström; Tom Persson
- Parents: Erling Persson (father); Margrit Persson (mother)
- Relatives: Lottie Tham (sister)

Carl Stefan Erling Persson (Swedish: [ˈstěːfan ˈpæ̌ːʂɔn]; born 4 October 1947) is a Swedish billionaire businessman. He was the chairman of fashion company H&M until May 2020, when he was succeeded by his son; he remains the company's largest shareholder, owning a 36% stake. The company was founded by his father Erling Persson in 1947.

Persson took over H&M from his father in 1982 and was its manager until 1998. He also owns a substantial stake in the Swedish technology company Hexagon AB. Through his privately held real estate company Ramsbury Invest, Persson owns a large number of properties in London, Paris and Stockholm.

He is the sole director of Ramsbury Estates Limited, which farms 19,000 acres (7,700 ha) in the English counties of Wiltshire, Berkshire and Hampshire, centred on the village of Ramsbury in Wiltshire. Since Persson acquired the business in 1997, it has bought the land of several neighbouring estates including Littlecote and Hungerford Park.

According to Bloomberg Billionaires Index, Persson had a net worth of US$24.6 billion in August 2026, making him the 102nd richest person in the world at the time. In the same year, Forbes described him as Sweden's richest person.

== Early life ==
Stefan Persson is the son of Erling Persson, who founded H&M in 1947. He earned an associate qualification from Stockholm University.

== Personal life ==
Persson is a founder of the Mentor Foundation, a non-profit organisation that aims to combat substance abuse among young people. He is a supporter of Djurgårdens IF and is co-funding a foundation for the club. Persson enjoys downhill skiing, tennis and golf. He owns properties in London, Paris and Stockholm and, in 2009, acquired the 21-cottage village of Linkenholt in Hampshire, England.

Persson has three children from his first marriage, to Pamela Collett. In 2009, his son, Karl-Johan Persson, took over as president and chief executive of H&M. His other two children, Tom Persson and Charlotte Söderström are also billionaires.

Persson lives in Stockholm, Sweden, with his second wife, Denise Persson, née Florman.
