= John H. MacMillan =

American businessman (1895–1960)

John Hugh MacMillan Jr.
- Born: 1895; Texas, US
- Died: December 23, 1960 (aged 64–65)
- Resting place: Lakewood Cemetery, Minneapolis, Minnesota, US
- Education: Yale University
- Occupation: Business executive
- Spouse: Marion Dickson
- Children: John Hugh MacMillan; Whitney Duncan MacMillan; Marion MacMillan Pictet
- Parent(s): John H. MacMillan Sr. Edna Clara Cargill
- Relatives: William Wallace Cargill (maternal grandfather)

John Hugh MacMillan Jr. (1895 – December 23, 1960) was an American businessman, president of Cargill from 1936 to 1960.

== Early life ==
He was born in Texas in 1895, the son of John H. MacMillan Sr. and Edna Clara Cargill, the daughter of William Wallace Cargill, the founder of Cargill. He attended Yale University. After graduating Yale he entered the United States Army artillery, rising to the rank of Major when he was 23. MacMillan served in France during World War I.

== Career ==
After the war, he worked as a trader on the floor of the Minneapolis Chamber of Commerce for Cargill, the family grain business. His aggressive management style led Cargill employees to revolt in 1925. He took over for his father as president of Cargill in 1936 and grew the family-owned business significantly. He invested in the United States and expanded Cargill's operations into Europe and South America. During his tenure, sales topped $1 billion for the first time. He was succeeded by Erwin Kelm.

== Personal life ==
He married Marion Dickson (July 14, 1892 - November 22, 1980). They had children:

- John Hugh MacMillan (died 2008)
- Whitney Duncan MacMillan (died 2006)
- Marion MacMillan Pictet (1930–2009)

== Death ==
MacMillan died on December 23, 1960, and is buried at Lakewood Cemetery, Minneapolis.

Preceded by John H. MacMillan Sr.	President of Cargill; 1936 – 1960	Succeeded by Erwin Kelm
