= Marianne Cargill Liebmann =

American heir (Cargill), florist, billionaire

- Born: Marianne Cargill; 1953 (age 72–73)
- Education: Montana State University
- Known for: Cargill heir
- Children: 2
- Relatives: Austen S. Cargill II and James R. Cargill II (brothers)

Marianne Cargill Liebmann (born 1953) is an American billionaire heir.

== Biography ==
Marianne Cargill Liebmann is a great-granddaughter of William Wallace Cargill, the founder of Cargill. She has two brothers, Austen S. Cargill II and James R. Cargill II.

She graduated from Montana State University.

She lives in Bozeman, Montana, is married and has two children. As of May 2015, she was worth US$3.4 billion.
