= Octapharma =

Swiss pharmaceutical company

Octapharma AG
- Company type: Private
- Industry: Pharmaceutical industry
- Founded: 1983
- Headquarters: Lachen (canton of Schwyz), Switzerland
- Number of locations: 40
- Products: octanate; octanine-F; wilate; Nuwiq; octagam; gammanorm; rhesonativ; panzyga; albunorm; octaplas; atenativ; octaplex; octaplasLG; fibryga See complete products listing.
- Revenue: Euro 3.47 billion (2024)
- Number of employees: 11,141 (2024)
- Website: www.octapharma.com

Octapharma AG, founded in 1983 by Wolfgang Marguerre, is a family-owned pharmaceutical company based in Switzerland. It bills itself as "one of the largest human protein manufacturers in the world, developing and producing human proteins from human plasma and human cell lines."

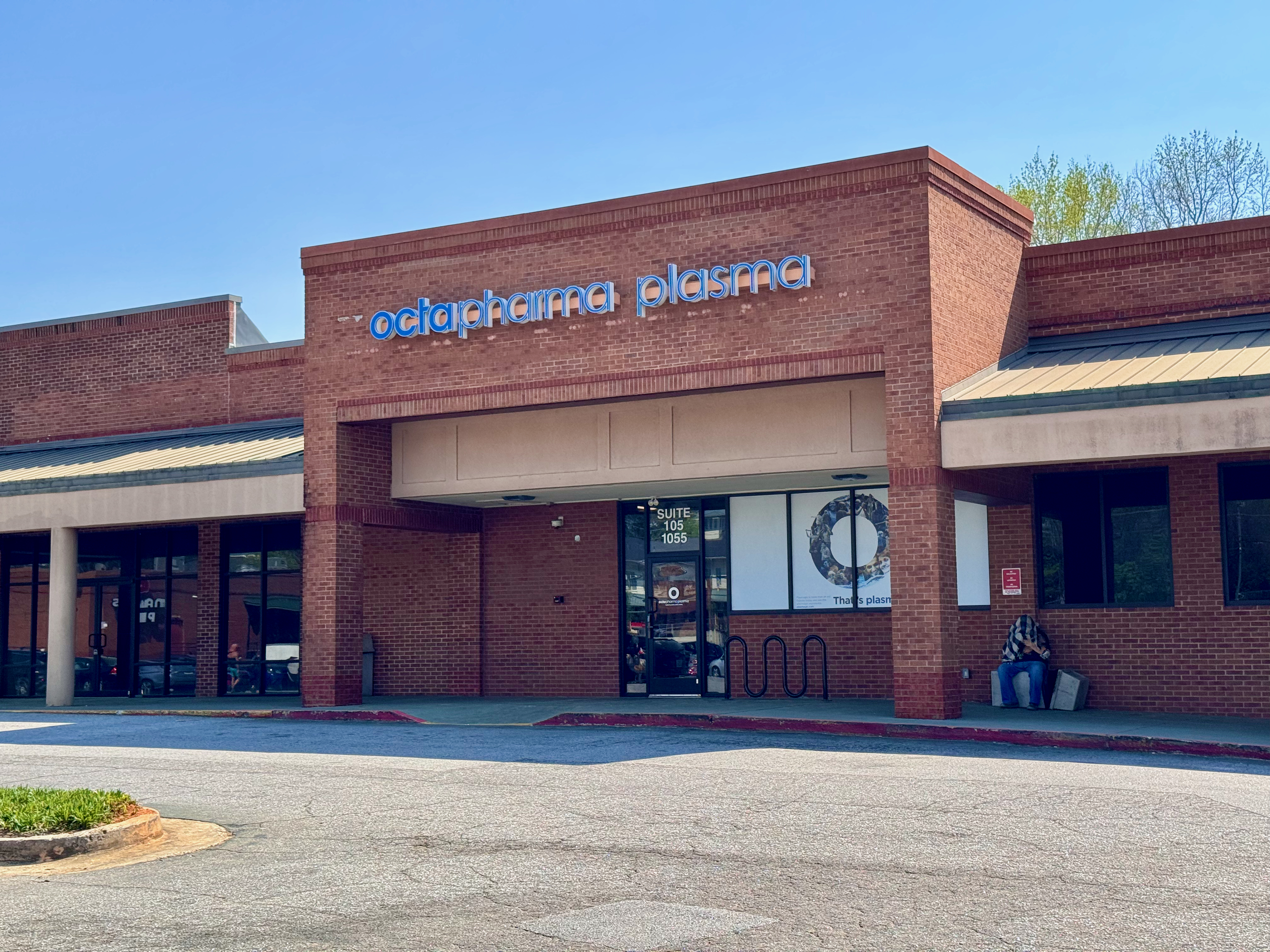
Octapharma Plasma location in Athens, Georgia

== History ==
Octapharma was founded in 1983 by Wolfgang Marguerre, a German businessman who had previously worked in the pharmaceutical industry. The name Octapharma is derived from the Greek word for eight, referring to Factor VIII, the blood clotting protein deficient in patients with haemophilia A. Octapharma's inaugural product was the first Factor VIII concentrate using what was then innovative solvent detergent virus inactivation technology.

The underlying principle of Octapharma's R&D is the development of therapies based on human proteins either purified from human plasma or produced by recombinant technologies applied to human cell lines.

On 17 April 2024, the US arm Octapharma Plasma temporarily halted its plasma donation centers due to the detection of unauthorized network activity consistent with a cyber attack, reportedly suffering from the BlackSuit ransomware. Octapharma later informed the Federal Bureau of Investigation and the California Attorney General that a threat actor accessed the network and exfiltrated files containing personal information.

== Family ownership ==
Octapharma remains privately owned company by the Marguerre family, and is currently led by Wolfgang Marguerre, chairman and CEO. Two of Marguerre's three children, Frederic and Tobias, have sat on the management board, with Tobias currently the deputy chairman.

== Therapeutic areas ==
Patients in 120 countries are treated with products in the following therapeutic areas:

- Haematology: high-purity coagulation factor concentrates for patients with bleeding disorders Haemophilia A, B and von Willebrand Disease.
- Immunotherapy: immunomodulation or immunoglobulin replacement therapy for the treatment of immune-mediated diseases and deficiencies (immune disorders including autoimmune diseases and antibody deficiency) by inducing, enhancing, or suppressing an immune response.
- Critical Care: human plasma and protein products for treating critically ill or injured patients in intensive care and emergency medicine settings.

== Products ==
Octapharma medicines treat a broad range of rare and life-threatening congenital and acquired diseases and conditions:

- Bleeding disorders (hemophilia A / B and VWD)
- Over 300 types of primary and secondary immune deficiencies
- Numerous auto-immune and neurological disorders
- Acute conditions
- Critical care issues (including trauma and burn victims)
- Cancer patients
- Major surgeries
- Protection of new-borns in case of Rh negative pregnancies.

== Production ==
Octapharma converts source plasma into plasma protein products through fractionation and processing. Each therapy created is controlled, fractionated, purified, virus-inactivated and inspected before being used.

As of December 31, 2024, Octapharma employs around 11,000 people worldwide to support the treatment of patients in 120 countries with products across three therapeutic areas: Hematology, Immunotherapy and Critical Care. Octapharma has seven R&D sites and five state-of-the-art manufacturing facilities in Austria, France, Germany and Sweden, and operates more than 190 plasma donation centers across Europe and the US.

== See also ==
- List of pharmaceutical companies
- Pharmaceutical industry in Switzerland
