= Austen Cargill =

American businessman

- Born: Austen Stowell Cargill; April 8, 1888; La Crosse, Wisconsin, U.S.
- Died: May 24, 1957 (aged 69); San Benito, California, U.S.
- Occupation: Businessman
- Spouse: Anne Ray Cargill
- Children: Margaret; James
- Parents: William Wallace Cargill; Ella Stowell Cargill
- Family: Cargill family

Austen Stowell Cargill (April 8, 1888 – May 24, 1957) was an American businessman. He was the son of William Wallace Cargill, the founder of Cargill, the largest privately held company in the United States.

== Early life ==
Austen Cargill was born on April 8, 1888 in La Crosse, Wisconsin, U.S. He was the fourth and youngest child of William Wallace Cargill and the former Ellen Theresa "Ella" Stowell. On his father's death, he inherited one-third of Cargill.

== Career ==
At the time of his death, he was president of Cargill. He was succeeded by Cargill MacMillan Sr, the eldest son of his sister Edna.

== Personal life ==
He married Anne Ray, and they had two children:

- Margaret Anne Cargill (1920–2006)
- James R. Cargill (1923–2006)

== Later life ==
Cargill died suddenly in California at the age of 69.
