= Marc Fielmann =

German businessman

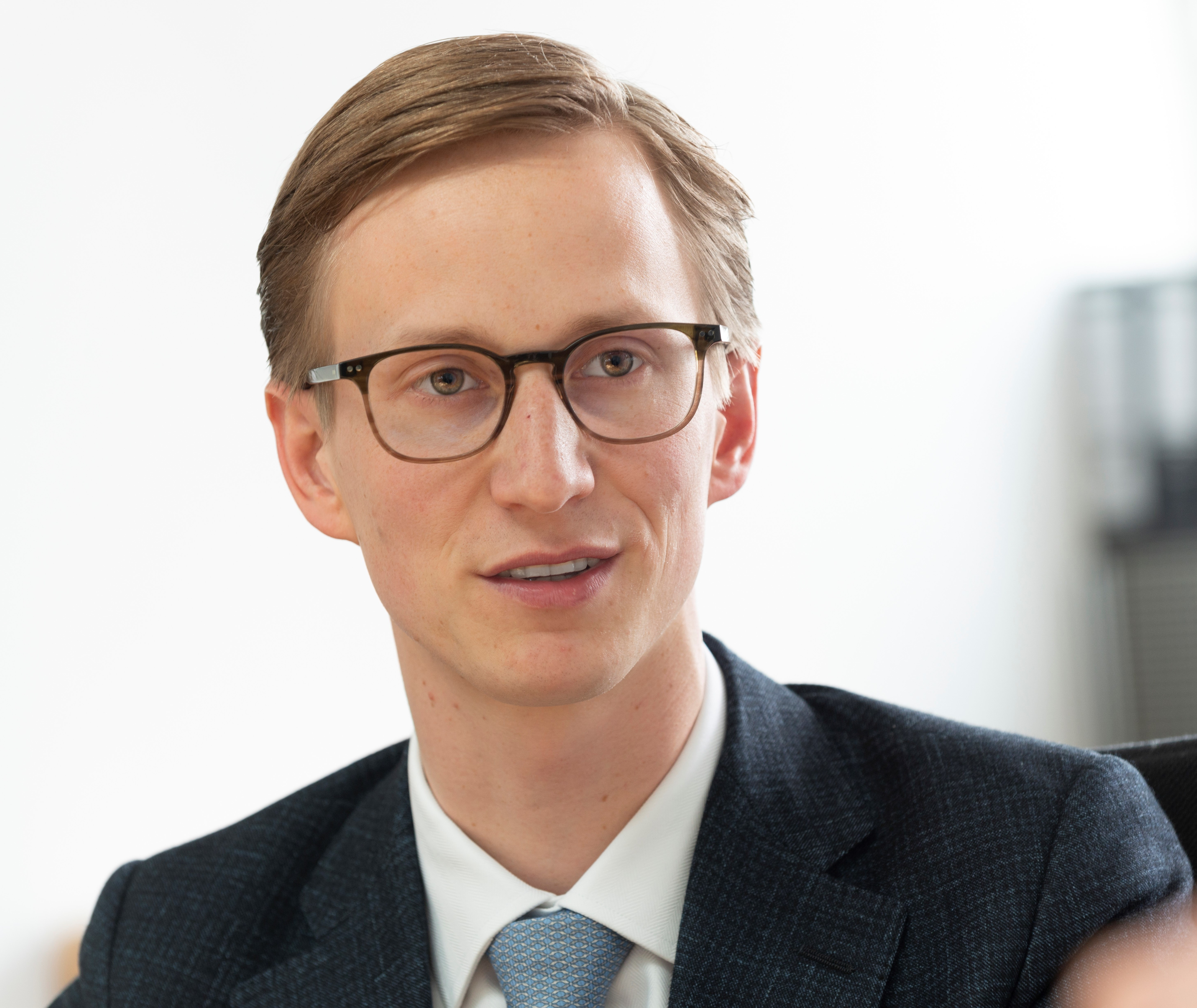
- Fielmann in 2020
- Born: Marc David Günther Fielmann; 24 July 1989 (age 37); Hamburg, West Germany (now Germany)
- Education: Salem Castle School; London School of Economics and Political Science (BSc)
- Occupation: Businessman
- Known for: CEO, Fielmann Group
- Spouse: Irina Pecherskikh (m. 2019)
- Parent(s): Günther Fielmann; Heike Fielmann

Marc David Günther Fielmann (born 24 July 1989), better known as Marc Fielmann, is a German businessman and optometrist. He is the CEO of Fielmann Group, the leading European eyewear provider which was founded by his father Günther Fielmann. Fielmann was Germany's youngest CEO when appointed only aged 29.

== Early life and education ==
Fielmann was born on 24 July 1989, the eldest child of Günther and Heike (née Eggert; b. 1968). He has one younger sister, Sophie Louise (b. 1994). Fielmann attended Schule Schloss Salem and London School of Economics and Political Science.

== Business career ==
Before entering the family business in 2012, Fielmann worked in the eyewear industry for Luxottica and Safilo Group.

Since April 2018, he is CEO of Fielmann AG with responsibility for marketing, communications and executive leadership. Since February 2019, he is also responsible for corporate strategy.

In 2019 Fielmann, aged 29, was the youngest CEO among listed companies in Germany, some claim he is even the youngest CEO among major listed companies worldwide.

Under his leadership, Fielmann AG has announced plans to dedicate more than €200 million to the international expansion and digitization of the group, investing in regional market leaders such as Optika Clarus, Óptica Universitaria, Medical Óptica and SVS Vision as well as technology companies such as the augmented reality application provider FittingBox, the smart glasses developers Ubimax and Deep Optics and e-commerce platform Befitting.

== Personal life ==
On 1 June 2019, Fielmann married Russian-born Irina Pecherskikh (b. 1989), at St. Catharinen Church in Westensee in Schleswig-Holstein. They were introduced in London.
