= Marijke Mars =

American billionaire heiress

- Born: 1965 (age 60–61); Veghel, Netherlands
- Education: Duke University
- Occupation: Businesswoman
- Employer: Mars Inc.
- Spouse: Stephen J. Doyle (m. 1991; div. 2000)
- Family: Mars family

Marijke Elizabeth Mars (born 1965) is an American billionaire heiress and businesswoman. In March 2018 Forbes estimated her net worth to be $5.9 billion. She was ranked as the 30th-richest woman in the world, a position shared with her three sisters. As of February 2026, Forbes estimated her net worth to be $11.4 billion.

Marijke Mars is a fourth generation member of the Mars family. Her father was the late Forrest Mars Jr. (1931–2016). She has three sisters: Pamela Mars-Wright, Valerie Mars and Victoria B. Mars. She inherited about an 8 percent stake on Mars Inc. in 2016, which made her a billionaire. According to Forbes, her shares were valued at $5.9 billion (March 2018).

She graduated (B.A./B.Sc.) from Duke University. After her graduation she worked as a regional manager for Kal Kan Foods, one of Mars Inc.'s pet food companies. Currently, she works at Mars Food. She married Stephen J. Doyle in 1991, but divorced in 2000.
