= John Franklyn Mars =

American billionaire businessman (born 1935)

John Mars
- Born: John Franklyn Mars; October 15, 1935 (age 90); Arlington, Virginia, U.S.
- Education: Yale University (BA)
- Occupation: Chairman of Mars Inc.
- Spouse: Adrienne Bevis (m. 1958)
- Children: 3
- Family: Mars family

John Franklyn Mars (born October 15, 1935) is an American businessman and heir. He is the chairman of Mars, Inc. As of May 2025, Bloomberg Billionaires Index estimated his net worth at US$44.6 billion, ranking him the 33rd-richest person in the world.

== Early life and education ==
John Franklyn Mars was born on October 15, 1935. He is the son of Audrey Ruth (Meyer) and Forrest Mars Sr., and grandson of Franklin Clarence Mars, founders of the American candy company Mars, Incorporated. Mars graduated from the Hotchkiss School in Lakeville, Connecticut, in 1953 and Yale University.

== Career ==
As a member of the Mars family, his share of the company and other assets were worth US$10 billion in September 2010, making him then the 52nd-richest person in the world and the 26th-richest person in America, according to Forbes. As of October 2012, Mars was listed as the 30th-richest person in the world with an estimated net worth of $20.1 billion.

According to the Hurun Global Rich List 2015, he was 28th richest person in the world with a net worth of US$26 billion. In 2016, his net worth went up to $29 billion, and he became then the 19th-richest person in the world.

In January 2017, he paid $7.7 billion for VCA, Inc, a pet care company.

== Personal life ==
He married Adrienne Bevis in June 1958. They have three children: Linda Anne Mars born May 23, 1960 (age 65), Frank Edward Mars born March 13, 1963 (age 63), and Michael John Mars born November 22, 1967 (age 58).

He formerly lived in Fairfax County, Virginia but now resides in Jackson, Wyoming. In the 2010 to 2014 Forbes rankings of personal wealth, Mars was the highest ranked person whose photograph was unavailable to the magazine.

In March 2015, Queen Elizabeth II awarded him an honorary knighthood at Windsor Castle.
