= John Hugh MacMillan =

American businessman

Hugh MacMillan III
- Born: John Hugh MacMillan III; February 28, 1928; Minneapolis, Minnesota, U.S.
- Died: April 23, 2008 (aged 80); Fort Lauderdale, Florida, U.S.
- Resting place: Lakewood Cemetery, Minneapolis, U.S.
- Education: Blake School; Berkshire School
- Alma mater: University of Minnesota
- Occupation: Business executive
- Employer: Cargill
- Spouse(s): Susan Velie (divorced); Patricia A. MacMillan
- Children: 9
- Relatives: Whitney Duncan MacMillan (brother); William Wallace Cargill (great-grandfather)

John Hugh MacMillan III (February 28, 1928 – April 23, 2008) was an American billionaire businessman.

== Early life ==
He was born on February 28, 1928, in Minneapolis, Minnesota, the son of John H. Macmillan Jr. and Marion Dickson, and grew up in Wayzata, Minnesota.

He was educated at the Blake School, Berkshire School in Sheffield, Massachusetts, West High School, and the University of Minnesota.

== Career ==
In 1955, MacMillan started working for Cargill, a company that his great grandfather had founded. Starting as a grain merchant, MacMillan held positions in Great Falls, Montana, Baton Rouge, Louisiana, and Minneapolis.

In 2007, Forbes estimated his net worth at $1.7 billion.

== Personal life ==
His first wife was Susan Velie (1931–2003), with whom he had three children, John Hugh MacMillan IV, David Deere MacMillan, and Kate MacMillan Reed. She later married Henry W. Norton, and became Susan Velie Norton. He was married to Patricia A. MacMillan. He was survived by his nine children, John H. MacMillan IV (Louise), David Macmillan (Karen), Kate Reed (Harold), Anne Pedrero (Robert), Donald MacMillan (Cynthia), Sandra Kirkpatrick (Todd), Daniel MacMillan, Christopher MacMillan (Greta), and Andrew MacMillan (Christina).

He died on April 23, 2008, in Fort Lauderdale, Florida, and is buried at Lakewood Cemetery, Minneapolis.
