= John H. MacMillan Sr. =

20th century American businessman

- Born: August 11, 1869; La Crosse, Wisconsin, US
- Died: October 20, 1944 (aged 75)
- Resting place: Oak Grove Cemetery, La Crosse, Wisconsin
- Occupation: Businessman
- Title: President of Cargill
- Term: 1909-1936
- Predecessor: William Wallace Cargill
- Successor: John H. MacMillan Jr.
- Spouse: Edna Clara Cargill
- Children: Cargill MacMillan; John H. MacMillan Jr.

John Hugh MacMillan Sr. (August 11, 1869 – October 20, 1944) was an American businessman, president of Cargill from 1909 to 1936.

== Early life ==
John Hugh MacMillan was born in La Crosse, Wisconsin, the son of Duncan McMillan, a director of the State Bank of La Crosse, and Mary Jane McCrea. His father's grand house was opposite a similarly grand house owned by William Wallace Cargill, and the offspring of both families played together as children.

== Career ==
At age 15, MacMillan started work at the State Bank of La Crosse, where his father was a director.

On the death of his father-in-law, he took over the leadership of Cargill. Following a heart attack, his son, John H. MacMillan Jr. took over as president in 1936, and remained in post until his death in 1960.

== Personal life ==
He married Edna Clara Cargill (1871–1963), the daughter of William Wallace Cargill, the founder of Cargill, and they had two sons, each of whom inherited one-third of Cargill:

- John H. MacMillan Jr. (1895–1960)
- Cargill MacMillan Sr. (1900–1968)

== Later life ==
He died on October 20, 1944. Both he and his wife are buried at Oak Grove Cemetery, La Crosse, Wisconsin.

Preceded by William Wallace Cargill	President of Cargill; 1909 – 1936	Succeeded by John H. MacMillan Jr.
