= Austen S. Cargill II =

American businessman

- Born: Austen Stowell Cargill; 1951 (age 74–75)
- Education: University of Minnesota; Oregon State University
- Occupations: Businessman and rancher, director of Cargill
- Known for: Heir of Cargill
- Children: 2
- Parents: James R. Cargill; Mary Janet Cargill
- Family: Cargill family

Austen Stowell Cargill II (born 1951) is an American billionaire heir, businessman and rancher.

== Biography ==
=== Early life ===
Austen Stowell Cargill II was born in 1951. He is the great-grandson of William Wallace Cargill, the founder of Cargill. He earned bachelor's and master's degrees from the University of Minnesota. He went on to earn a doctorate from Oregon State University.

=== Career ===
He joined Cargill as a marine biologist and joined its board of directors in 1995. He later served as a vice president until 2001. He was a board member of GalaGen, a NASDAQ-traded company that sold dietary supplements to treat gastrointestinal diseases, from 1999 to 2002 when it went bankrupt.

=== Personal life ===
In 2001, he bought the North Ranch in Paradise Valley, Montana, close to Antelope Butte. The ranch was formerly owned by the Church Universal and Triumphant. He goes ruffed grouse hunting in South Dakota. He lives in Livingston, Montana. He is divorced, and has two children.

== Bibliography ==
- Cargill, Austen S.; Cummins, Kenneth W.; Hanson, Boyd J.; Lowry, Robert R. (1985). "The role of lipids as feeding stimulants for shredding aquatic insects". Freshwater Biology. 15 (4): 455–464. Bibcode:1985FrBio..15..455C. doi:10.1111/j.1365-2427.1985.tb00215.x.
