= William Wallace Cargill =

American businessman

William W. Cargill
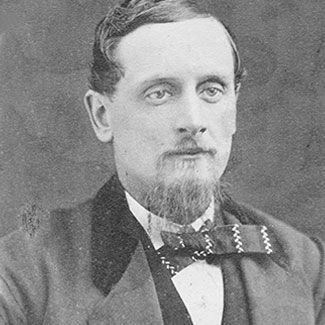
- Born: William Wallace Cargill; December 15, 1844; Port Jefferson, New York, U.S.
- Died: October 17, 1909 (aged 64); La Crosse, Wisconsin, U.S.
- Occupation: Businessman
- Known for: Founder of Cargill
- Spouse: Ellen Theresa Stowell (m. 1868)
- Children: 4, including Austen
- Family: Cargill family

William Wallace Cargill (December 15, 1844 – October 17, 1909) was an American businessman. In 1865, he founded Cargill, which by 2008 was the largest privately held corporation in the United States in terms of revenue, employing over 150,000 people in 68 countries.

== Early life ==
William Wallace Cargill was born on December 15, 1844, in Port Jefferson, New York. He was the third of seven children of Scottish sea captain William Dick Cargill, who had emigrated to New York in the late 1830s. His mother, Edna Davis, was a native of New York. In 1856, Cargill's parents relocated to Janesville, Wisconsin, to pursue an agricultural life.

== Career ==
In 1865, William W. Cargill started a small grain-storage business in Conover, Iowa, which eventually grew to become Cargill, Incorporated.

In 1867, he was joined by two of his younger brothers, Sam and Sylvester, in Lime Springs, Iowa, where Cargill built a grain flat house and opened a lumberyard. In 1875, another younger brother, James F. Cargill, joined the company.

== Personal life ==
Cargill married Ellen Theresa "Ella" Stowell on October 1, 1868. They had four children together:

- William Samuel "Will" Cargill, whose wife was Mary MacMillan Cargill
- Edna Clara Cargill (1871–1963), who married John H. MacMillan Sr. (1869–1940)
- Emma Cargill, who married Fred M. Hanchette
- Austen Cargill, whose wife was Anne Ray Cargill

== Later life and death ==
In 1904, Cargill suffered from a stroke, which prompted his retirement from most day-to-day work in the company. In October 1909, Cargill became ill during a trip to Montana. He returned home and was treated, but died of pneumonia on October 17, 1909.

Cargill's entire estate was to be passed on to his wife by law, but as it was going through probate, his widow Ellen also died on March 25, 1910. This meant that the Cargill company was to be divided equally among his children. He was succeeded as president of Cargill by his son-in-law, John H. MacMillan Sr.

Preceded by n/a	President of Cargill; 1865 – 1909	Succeeded by John H. MacMillan Sr.
