= Northvolt =

Swedish battery developer and manufacturer

Northvolt AB
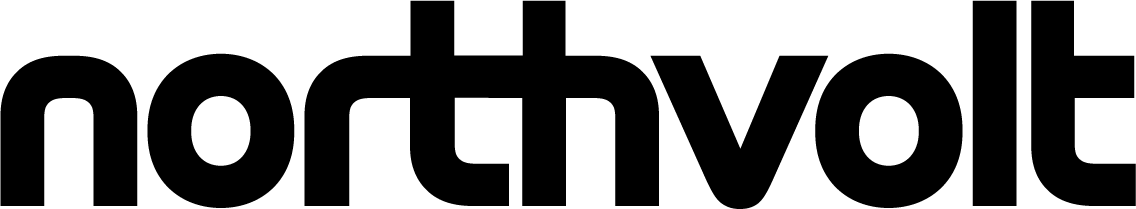
- Type: Aktiebolag
- Founded: 2015; 11 years ago (as SGF Energy)
- Founders: Peter Carlsson; Paolo Cerruti; Harald Mix; Carl-Erik Lagercrantz
- Defunct: March 12, 2025
- Fate: Bankrupt
- Headquarters: Stockholm, Sweden
- Key people: Carl-Erik Lagercrantz (vice-chairman); Tom Johnstone (chairman); Peter Carlsson (CEO)
- Number of employees: over 6,500 (2024)
- Website: northvolt.com

Northvolt AB was a Swedish battery developer and manufacturer, interested in lithium-ion technology for electric vehicles. Founded in 2015 by two former Tesla executives, it commissioned its first manufacturing plant in Skellefteå Municipality, Sweden in 2021 and announced plans for five others in Europe and North America. The company filed Chapter 11 bankruptcy in the United States on November 21, 2024. It subsequently filed for bankruptcy in Sweden on March 12, 2025. It is the largest bankruptcy in modern Swedish industrial history.

== History ==
=== 2015: founding ===
The company was founded as SGF Energy in 2015 by Peter Carlsson and Paolo Cerruti (now CEO Northvolt North America) who were working in Supply Chain and Operations Planning at Tesla Motors prior to that. It was founded with their stated aim to supply the automotive industry with electric vehicle batteries.

In 2017, the company changed its name to Northvolt. In the same year, it received a EUR 52.5 million loan from the European Investment Bank for the construction of a demonstration plant in Västerås, Sweden, for the manufacturing of advanced Lithium-ion cells.

=== 2019: construction on the site in Skellefteå Municipality starts ===
News website EURACTIV stated in March 2019 that "Northvolt is quickly building a reputation as the EU’s go-to company for home-grown batteries."

In May 2019, the European Investment Bank offered a loan of 3.5 billion SEK (about €350 million), with the backing of the European Union's InnovFin programme. In June of the same year, companies such as the BMW Group, Volkswagen Group, Goldman Sachs and Folksam announced that they would invest in the company. Volkswagen invested 900 million Euros in Northvolt amounting to a share of 20% and a seat on the board.

In total, the investments amounted to US$1.6 billion from a consortium of commercial banks, pension funds and other financial institutions. The loans and investments were framed as a way to challenge what was reported as the dominance of Tesla, Inc. and Asian companies such as Toyota and Nissan on the market for electric vehicle batteries.

The company started building a battery factory in Skellefteå, Sweden, with the aim to start production of electric vehicle batteries in 2021. The first battery in Skellefteå was assembled in December 2021, and the first customer cell deliveries were made in 2022.

In 2019, Volkswagen and Northvolt had announced that a second factory would be built in Salzgitter, Germany, aiming to start production in 2023–2024. The aim was to start production at 16 GWh, and increase it to 24 GWh. In May 2020, Volkswagen announced that it would build the factory largely on its own, and invest 450 million euros in the construction.

On 16 July 2020, it was announced that Northvolt and BMW had signed a deal of 2 billion euros, for Northvolt to deliver batteries starting from 2024. The deal with BMW was cancelled in June 2024 because of Northvolt not being able to deliver on time.

On 22 August 2023, Northvolt raised $1.2 billion amid plans to open a battery plant in Canada. In December 2023, a classified interim report uncovered by Dagens industri showed that the company in the first nine months of 2023 performed with a net loss of about $1 billion (SEK 11 billion). In January 2024 Northvolt raised another $5 billion through green lending.

=== 2024: trouble ===
In 2024, the Northvolt factory in Sweden garnered attention when three employees died outside their work shifts, all within a few months, despite being seemingly healthy. A fourth death then occurred by drowning. Swedish police launched a criminal investigation, which Northvolt welcomed saying the incidents were "tragic", but also stressing that the factory employs over 5,000 people, implying that the deaths are not as statistically significant as they may appear at first glance. A leading Swedish toxicologist has argued for closure of the plant for a more thorough investigation to be conducted. In December 2024, the Swedish police concluded their investigation and found no evidence that the deaths were linked to any crime or hazardous exposures.

On September 23, 2024, Northvolt announced that the company would implement extensive staff reductions. A total of 1,600 employees would be affected by the layoffs, distributed across 1,000 positions in Skellefteå, 400 in Västerås, and 200 in Stockholm. In conjunction with this, Northvolt also announced that the expansion of Northvolt Ett would be discontinued. The Northvolt Labs project in Västerås was paused, but the company would retain the fundamental platforms to enable continued product development.

On November 21, 2024, Northvolt filed for Chapter 11 bankruptcy protection in the United States, stating it had only $30 million in cash, enough for them to operate one more week, while carrying $5.8 billion in debts. The company secured $100 million in financing for interim operation. The company's co-founder and CEO, Peter Carlsson, resigned the next day, stating the company needed at least $1 billion to continue long-term operation. Investors in the company began to write down their investments, including losses to the Canada Pension Plan Investment Board (CPPIB) and a $400 million loss for Investment Management Corp. of Ontario.

On December 4, 2024, Northvolt announced that it would sell its electric industrial battery division in an effort to cut costs and shrink its business. The company also reported plans to shut down its energy storage systems division. On January 7, 2025, Northvolt announced it was planning to continue developing battery cells while it plans to continue seeking funds to exit its bankruptcy proceedings.

=== 2025: bankruptcy ===
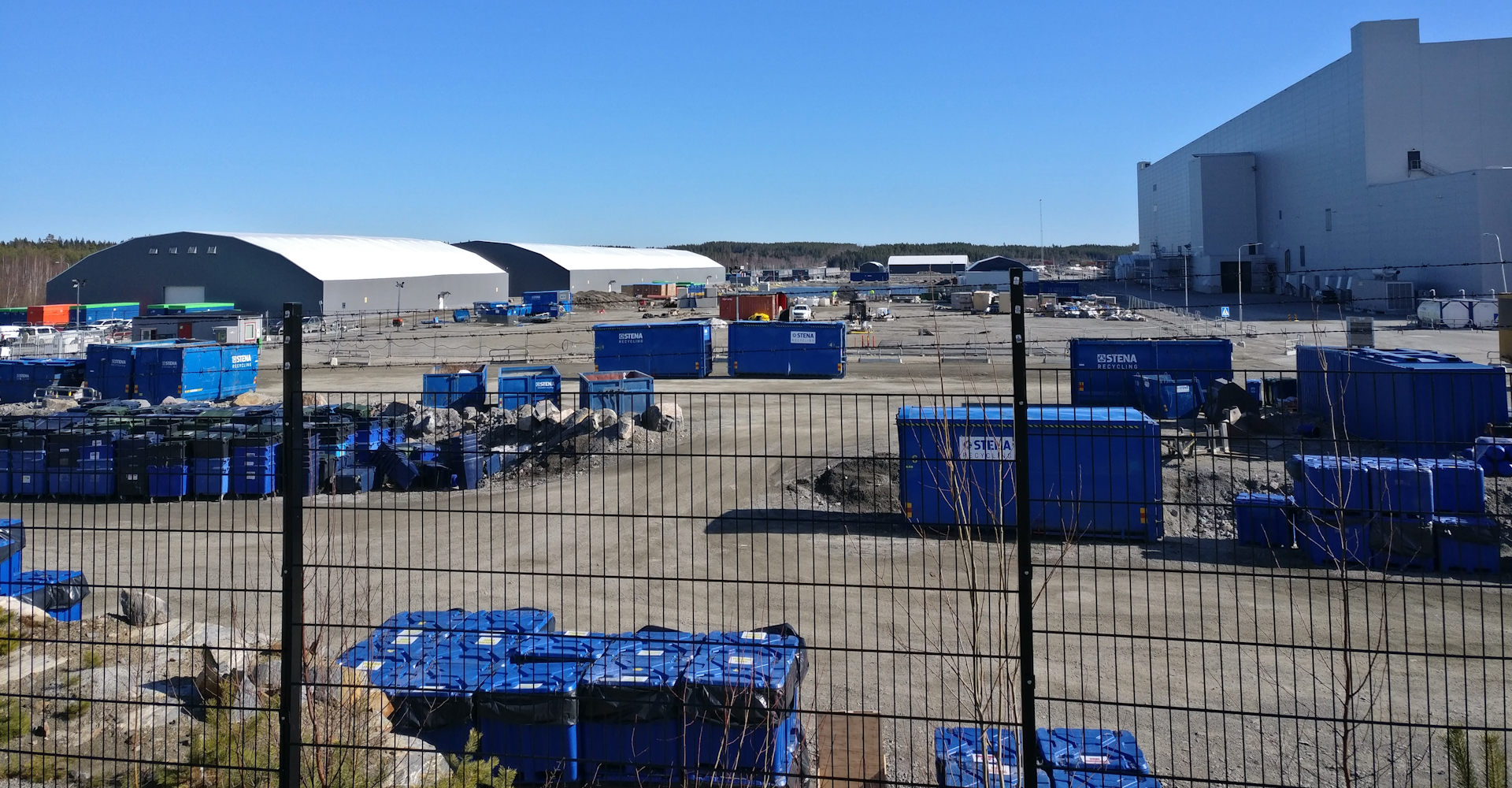
6 years after construction started the site still looks messy, and large quantities of waste are stored outside of the huge halls.

On January 13, 2025, Northvolt sold its remaining stakes in Hydrovolt, its battery recycler division, to Norsk Hydro for 78 million Norwegian crowns ($6.79 million).

On March 12, 2025, Northvolt applied for bankruptcy in Sweden. The Swedish public broadcaster SVT investigated the case in its programme "Uppdrag Granskning" some weeks before, and concluded that probably only a very limited quantity of accumulators was sold, and those were produced from intermediate materials purchased from other companies, against the promises of Northvolt that the complete production chain from raw metals to finished accumulator cells would occur on one single site, and "100% in Sweden". Workers reported anonymously that substantial parts of the production process would be dysfunctional. The bankruptcy caused among other people losing jobs, people without Swedish citizenship additionally being deported, the plans of the Skellefteå Municipality for "green growth" crushed, and loss of money in pension funds. Nevertheless Peter Carlsson took a private gain of circa 200,000,000 SEK from the company in good time before leaving, and considered this as perfectly appropriate.

Northvolt's bankruptcy trustee announced on that it had reached an agreement with key stakeholders for financial guarantees to allow the company to continue operations on a smaller scale. After filing for bankruptcy on March 12, Northvolt, once Europe's top contender in the electric vehicle battery market, will maintain operations with about 1,700 employees, down from 5,000. Also, some additional staff will be employed in foreign subsidiaries. The agreement is expected to be formalized soon, with the scaled-back operations seen as crucial for potential future sale of the business.

In May 2025, former Northvolt employee Mikaela Lundh published a book titled "Northvolt – en skildring inifrån" (rough translation: "Northvolt – a testimony from inside"), revealing that the company’s leadership was aware of significant production and financial issues as early as 2022. Despite internal concerns, management chose to withhold this information to avoid alarming investors and customers. The book details how initial battery cell tests in 2022 showed unacceptable defect rates, and how challenges such as humidity control, automation failures, and component delays plagued the production process. Financial analysts within the company warned of escalating costs and diminishing capital, but these warnings were reportedly downplayed by executives. The leadership also allegedly threatened to dismiss employees suspected of leaking information to the media. On 2025-05-22 the bankruptcy manager decided that the limited production still ongoing at that time is to be completely stopped successively during June, while there reportedly was good progress in efforts to sell certain parts of the company.

== Former assets ==
Northvolt had many expansion plans in Sweden, Germany and Canada before its bankruptcy in March 2025. Most assets (gigafactories already built or under construction) were sold as part of a liquidation deal to Lyten (a US lithium-sulfur battery company) during 2025.

=== Research and Development ===
Its center for research and development was situated in Västerås, Sweden, while the headquarters were located in Stockholm, Sweden.

=== Northvolt Ett ===
Northvolt Ett (swedish: "one") is a gigafactory located in Skellefteå, northern Sweden, with a goal output of 60GWh. When finished, it would be the largest factory in Swedish history, possibly creating challenges for newcomers and the existing community. The nearby hydropower plant of Skellefteå Kraft provides renewable energy for the factory. Nearby mines in Sweden and Finland can supply some of the needed metals like nickel and cobalt.

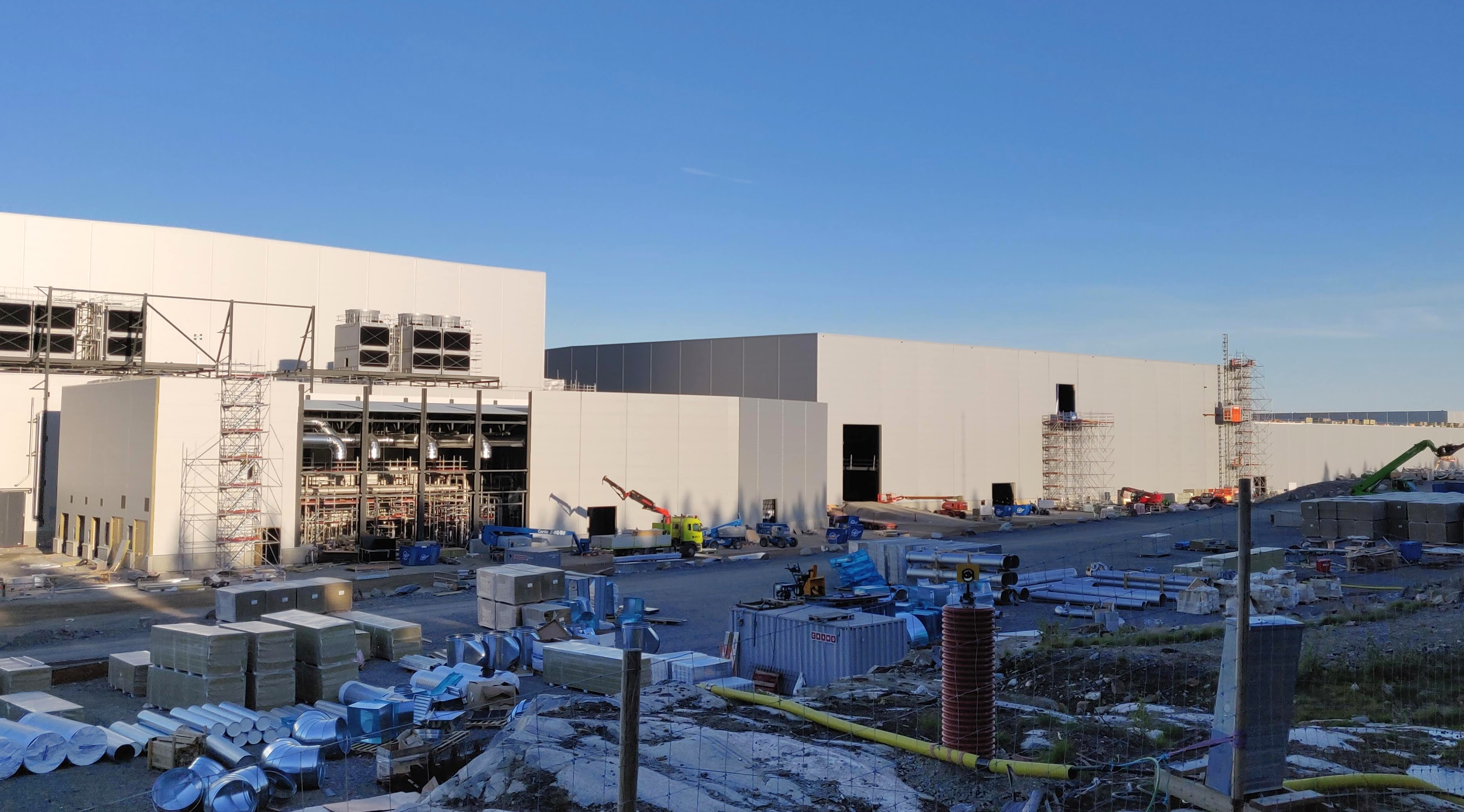
Construction of the first factory in Skellefteå, June 2021

In late December 2021, the company announced that Northvolt Ett, with 500 workers, had produced its first batch of prismatic cells, as part of its machinery commissioning process.

Factory completion and initial customer shipments were achieved in 2022. The company projects battery output of 16 gigawatt hours (GWh), enough for ~300,000 EVs, by 2024. With full production lines and staffing, the plant expects to produce 60 GWh of batteries with 3,000 employees.

For the first three quarters of 2023 the factory output was 79,8MWh of battery storage equivalent.

On September 23, 2024, Northvolt announced that the expansion of Northvolt Ett would be discontinued.

On October 8, 2024, Northvolt announced that its subsidiary Northvolt Ett Expansion AB filed an application for bankruptcy at the District Court of Stockholm.

=== Northvolt Dwa ===
"Dwa" (Two) was a 25,000 m² factory in Gdańsk, Poland, opened by Northvolt in 2023. It was sold to Lyten in June 2025, after the bankruptcy of Northvolt.

At the time of construction, it was Europe’s largest battery energy storage system (BESS) production facility, with an annual capacity of 6 GWh.

=== Northvolt Drei ===
Northvolt Drei was a planned battery factory in Dithmarschen near Heide, Germany. Announced in 2022, it was green lit in January 2024 following €902 million funding approval from the European Commission under the TCTF aid initiative and construction began on March 25, 2024.

After Northvolt's bankruptcy in mid-2024, some concerns erupted regarding a potential restructuring and it was uncertain if the plant would be completed, but it ended up being bought by Lyten in November 2024 as part of the acquisition of many other Northvolt assets.

=== Northvolt/Volvo Cars Joint Venture "Novo Energy" ===
In 2021, Northvolt and Volvo Cars announced a joined venture called "Novo Energy", to create battery gigafactories. The plan was to build batteries for Volvo's successor of the XC60 model, and for the Polestar brand. and production was scheduled to start in 2025.

However, after Northvolt's bankruptcy, Volvo Cars announced on the 30th of October 2024 that it would be invoking its redemption rights to acquire Northvolt’s shares in NOVO Energy, because Northvolt had not fulfilled its financing obligations.

=== Northvolt Fem ===
Northvolt Fem (Swedish: five) was a gigafactory planned by Northvolt in Sweden. It was set to be built on the site of the Kvarnsveden paper mill in Borlänge, which was purchased from Stora Enso, and was expected to open in 2024. After the bankruptcy of Northvolt, plans were shelved in late 2024, and the land was sold back to the municipality.

=== Northvolt Six ===
In the fall of 2023, Northvolt began plans to build a new battery gigafactory near Montreal, Canada. Initially the factory intended to start production in 2026, but quickly suffered heavy delays (12–18 months). After the bankruptcy of Northvolt AB, the Canadian government announced it would be cancelling its partial funding of the project, effectively killing the project.

=== Northvolt Cuberg ===
Cuberg was a Northern California start-up focused on developing batteries using the lithium-ion technology, aiming for applications in specific fields like aviation. Cuberg had spun out of Stanford University in 2015 and had production facilities in San Leandro. It was acquired in November 2021 by Northvolt, and renamed "Northvolt Cuberg".

In 2024 however, Northvolt's increasingly difficult financial position meant they wouldn't be able to keep funding Cuberg's research. After various plans of finding alternate fundings failed, the company ended up being shut down in November 2024.

The site was resold in late 2024 to Lyten, a manufacturer of lithium–sulfur batteries.
