= Helena Helmersson =

Swedish business executive (born 1973)

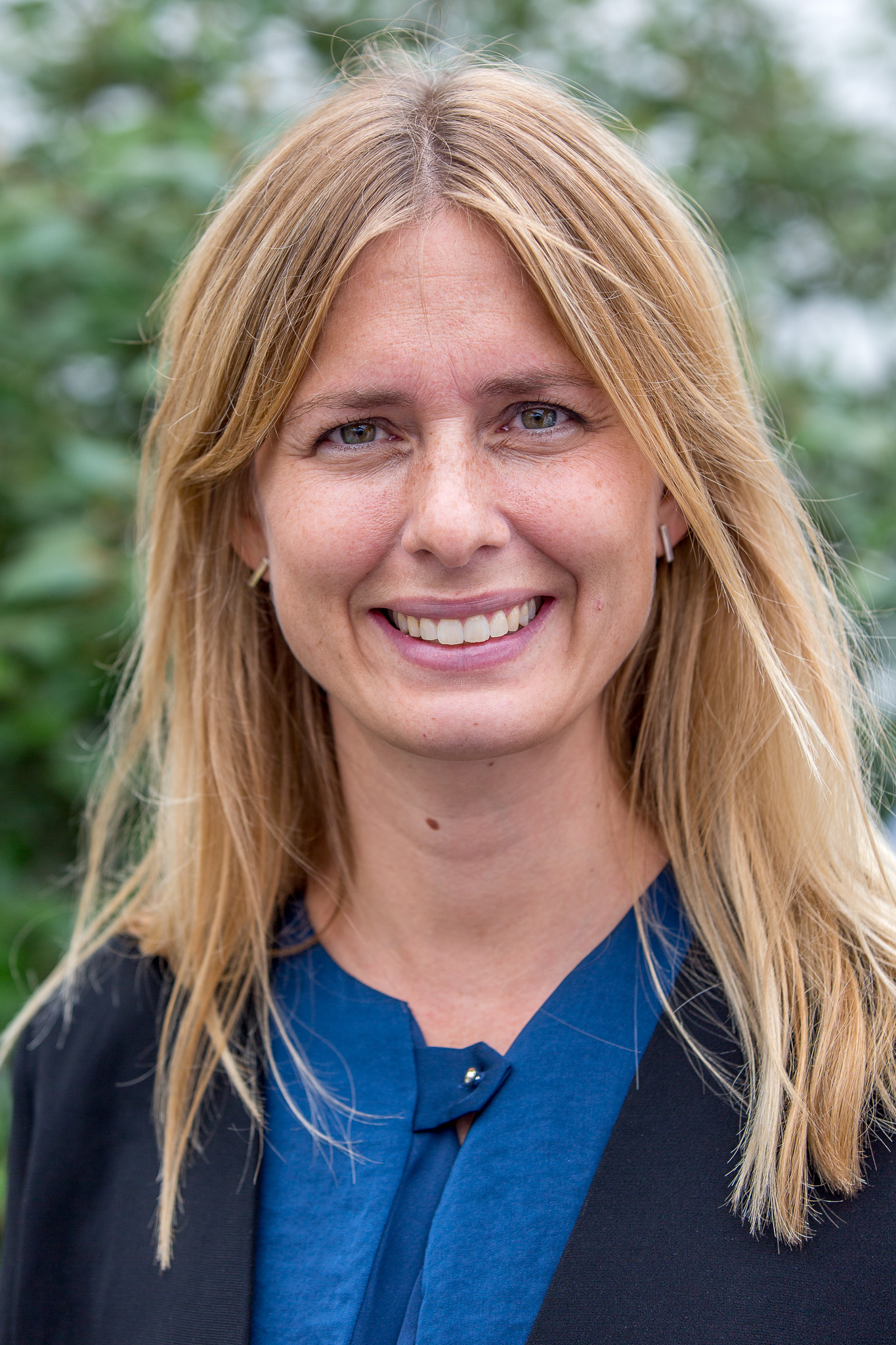
- Helmersson in 2014
- Born: Helena Helmersson; October 1973 (age 52); Skellefteå, Sweden
- Education: Umeå University
- Occupation: Business executive
- Title: Chief executive, H&M
- Term: 2020–2024
- Predecessor: Karl-Johan Persson
- Successor: Daniel Ervér
- Children: 2

Helena Helmersson (born October 1973) is a Swedish business executive. From 2010 to 2020, she was head of sustainability at the Swedish retail clothing company H&M, and from 2020 to 2024 she was its CEO.

== Early life ==
Helmersson was born in Skellefteå in the north of Sweden, where she lived with her parents and two sisters. She graduated with a master's degree in international business administration from the Umeå School of Business and Economics in 1997.

== Career ==
Helmersson joined H&M in 1997. She became a section manager in the buying office before she went to Dhaka, Bangladesh in 2007 where she was H&M's production manager. After a further period serving as their department manager for underwear production in Hong Kong.

In 2010 when she returned to Stockholm to be manager for social responsibility and supply. Helmersson's responsibilities covered the improvement of the social and environmental sustainability of supply, contributing to H&M's sustainability strategy which was initially implemented in the 1990s.

She was appointed CEO of H&M on 30 January 2020. During her tenure H&M faced financial challenges due to the COVID pandemic, the 2021 Xinjiang cotton boycott and losses from disinvesting in Russia as a result of the Russo-Ukrainian war as well as global supply chain difficulties and costs.

On 31 January 2024, it was announced that Helmersson would be replaced as CEO of H&M by Daniel Ervér.

[…]it has been very demanding at times for me personally and I now feel that it is time to leave the CEO role, which of course has not been an easy decision.

— Helmersson

In June 2024, Henderson joined the board of Quizrr, a Swedish digital training platform company founded by her husband. In December that year, she joined Sweden-based textile recycling company Circulose (formerly Renewcell) as chair following its bankruptcy. The following year, she was elected to the boards of On Holding AG and the Spanish retailer Mango.

== Recognition ==
In March 2014, Helmersson was listed as Sweden's "Most Powerful Woman in Business" by the weekly business magazine Veckans Affärer.

In 2019, she received the "Influential Leader" recognition from the Association to Advance Collegiate Schools of Business (AACSB) for influencing the way corporations view sustainability.

Helmersson was awarded an honorary doctorate by the Faculty of Social Sciences at Umeå University in 2020 for her commitment to sustainability issues.

She was ranked 41st on Fortune's list of Most Powerful Women in 2023.

== Personal life ==
Helmersson is married and has two children. She lives in Danderyd Municipality.
