= Lyten =

American advanced materials company

- Type: Private
- Industry: Battery manufacturing; Advanced materials
- Founded: 2015; 11 years ago
- Headquarters: San Jose, California, United States
- Products: Lithium–sulfur batteries
- Website: lyten.com

Lyten, Inc. is an American advanced materials company headquartered in San Jose, California. It develops composites, sensors, and lithium–sulfur batteries. The company is known for its proprietary 3D graphene platform and its efforts to commercialize next-generation battery chemistries that avoid reliance on critical minerals such as cobalt and nickel. Lyten serves markets including electric vehicles, aerospace, energy storage, construction, and industrial sensing.

== History ==
Lyten was founded in 2015 by Daniel Cook, Lars Herlitz, Scott Mobley and William Wraith III. Lyten develops a proprietary three-dimensional carbon material known as "3D Graphene", which is produced by converting methane into solid carbon and hydrogen gas via a carbon capture process. This material is described by independent sources as chemically and structurally different from traditional two-dimensional graphene. Lyten's 3D Graphene forms the foundation for several of its product lines, including lithium-sulfur batteries, lightweight composites, and environmental sensors.

Lyten initially operated in a stealth‑mode period during which it concentrated on research and pilot production of its proprietary "3D Graphene" platform for advanced materials. In September 2021, the company announced its emergence from stealth and introduced its "LytCell EV" lithium–sulfur battery platform targeted at automotive applications and noted prior work with U.S. government defence programs and later indicated its intention to serve aerospace markets.

In 2023, Lyten signed a Memorandum of Understanding (MoU) with the Luxembourg government to establish its European headquarters in the country.

Since its founding, Lyten has raised over $600 million in funding from a range of investors, including Stellantis, FedEx and the United States government in the form of project grants. These investments have supported research and pilot production of lithium–sulfur battery technology, as well as expansion into construction and sensor markets.

In October 2024, Lyten announced plans to construct a lithium–sulfur battery gigafactory in Reno, Nevada, with a projected investment of over $1 billion and a planned capacity of 10 gigawatt-hours per year.

In 2025, Lyten acquired several European battery manufacturing facilities from the bankrupt Swedish battery company Northvolt, including gigfactories in Poland and Sweden. The acquisition also included intellectual property portfolio. Lyten also acquired Northvolt's electric vehicle battery gigafactory in Skellefteå, Sweden. Although the factory closed in March 2025, Lyten rehired most of the laid-off workforce and began preparations to restart production.

== Products and technology ==
=== 3D Graphene ===
Lyten's 3D Graphene is manufactured through a proprietary process that converts methane, a greenhouse gas, into nanostructured carbon, simultaneously producing hydrogen gas. This novel carbon material is used in lightweight structural composites, electrical conductors, and sensors. The company states that its three-dimensional version of carbon, similar to the properties of graphene, is tunable in morphology and electrical properties, allowing for use in multiple applications.

=== Lithium–Sulfur batteries ===
Lyten has developed lithium–sulfur (Li–S) battery cells as a lightweight alternative to conventional lithium-ion batteries. The company’s batteries are designed without cobalt, nickel, or manganese minerals that are both geopolitically sensitive and environmentally costly to mine. According to the company, its lithium-sulfur cells provide up to 40% weight savings compared to traditional chemistries.

In mid-2023, Lyten began semi-automated pilot-scale production of 6.5 Ah lithium–sulfur pouch cells in San Jose, California. These cells have been delivered as A-samples to customers in the automotive, aerospace, and defense sectors.

In October 2024, Lyten announced it would invest over $1 billion to build a lithium–sulfur battery gigafactory in Nevada, with a target production capacity of 10 gigawatt-hours annually.

In third-party testing, Lyten's lithium–sulfur pouch cells reached a maximum of 110 cycles before testing was halted due to a soft-shorting issue. By comparison, mature lithium iron phosphate (LFP) lithium-ion cells typically support more than 3,000 cycles under most conditions.

=== Sensors and composites ===
In addition to batteries, Lyten manufactures chemical and environmental sensors based on its 3D graphene. These sensors are used in applications ranging from gas leak detection to industrial health and safety. The company also supplies lightweight graphene composites for aerospace and automotive customers.

== Strategic partnerships and investments ==
Lyten has attracted investment and support from both private and public sectors. Strategic investors include Stellantis, FedEx, Honeywell, Prime Movers Lab, and Walbridge Group. In 2023, Stellantis Ventures announced a partnership with Lyten to advance the development of lithium–sulfur batteries for electric vehicles. Lyten has also received financial support and commitments from the United States government. In 2025, the U.S. Export–Import Bank issued a letter of interest for up to $650 million in financing to support Lyten's planned battery manufacturing facility in Nevada.

In Europe, the Luxembourg Future Fund and the European Investment Fund have participated in Lyten’s funding rounds. In the aerospace sector, Lyten partnered with AEVEX Aerospace to integrate lithium–sulfur batteries into unmanned aerial systems.

== Acquisitions and expansion ==
In 2025, Lyten acquired the European battery energy storage assets of the bankrupt company Northvolt, including manufacturing facilities in Poland and Sweden. This acquisition included intellectual property and staff from Northvolt's former operations.

Following the acquisition, Lyten established its European headquarters in Gdańsk, Poland, and reinstated several former Northvolt executives to lead operations in the region.

== Leadership ==
As of 2025, Dan Cook serves as Lyten’s President and Chief Executive Officer. Lars Herlitz is Chairman of the Board.
