= COS (fashion brand) =

Fashion retailer

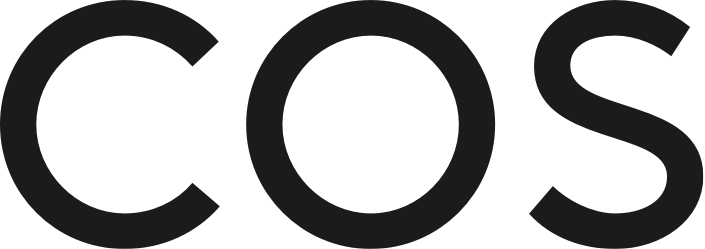
- Founded: March 2007
- Founder: Karl-Johan Persson
- Headquarters: London, England
- Owner: H&M
- Website: www.cos.com

COS (Collection Of Style) is a Swedish fashion brand in the H&M Group. The brand retails contemporary minimalist clothing for women and men at mid-range prices, advertising a design ethos of pieces made to last beyond the season with a focus on craftsmanship, using sustainably-sourced materials. The brand's marketing strategy has long sought to associate it with art and design.

== History ==
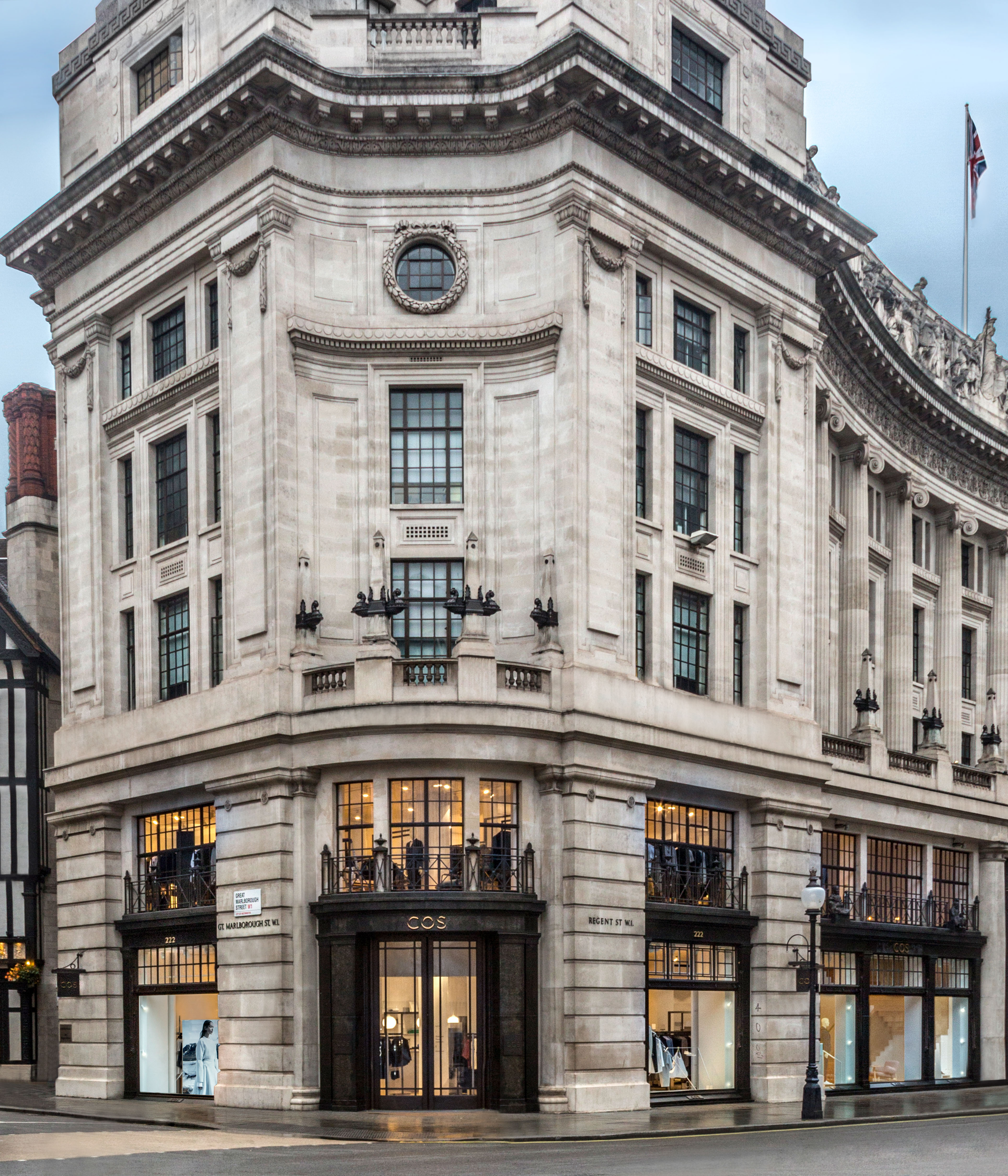
COS store on Regent Street in London

COS first opened on London's Regent Street in March 2007 with a catwalk show at the Royal Academy. COS launched its online store in 2011. The first store in North America opened in 2014. As of December 2022, COS had 259 stores in 47 countries, and was selling online in over 38 countries.
