= Skellefteå IBK =

Floorball club in Skellefteå, Sweden

- Full name: Skellefteå innebandyklubb
- Short name: SIBK
- Founded: 1985
- Arena: Eddahallen, Skellefteå, Sweden

Skellefteå IBK is a floorball club in Skellefteå, Sweden, established 1985. The men's team played six seasons in the Swedish top division, starting with the 1989–1990 season.
