= Blaiken wind farm =

Wind farm in Sweden

- Country: Sweden
- Location: Storuman Municipality, Västerbotten County
- Coordinates: 65°17′N 17°13′E
- Status: Operational
- Construction began: 2011
- Commission date: 2017
- Construction cost: €3.8 billion SEK
- Owners: Skellefteå Kraft; Fortum

Power generation
- Units operational: 99
- Nameplate capacity: 247.5 MW
- Annual net output: 700 GWh

The Blaiken wind farm is a wind farm built by BlaikenVind AB, a joint venture of Skellefteå Kraft and Fortum. It is one of Europe's largest wind farms in northern Sweden. The park consists of 99 wind power plants and has a total capacity of 247.5 MW. The farm has also been chosen as a demonstration plant by the EU's NER300 programme, one of the world's largest funding programmes for climate-neutral energy, and meets the challenge of developing good solutions for efficient wind power production in a cold and icy climate.
