= Patrik Wallón =

Swedish ice hockey player (born 1988)

- Born: May 2, 1988 (age 38) Skellefteå, Sweden
- Height: 5 ft 10 in (178 cm)
- Weight: 187 lb (85 kg; 13 st 5 lb)
- Position: Defence
- Shot: Left
- Played for: Skellefteå AIK; Piteå HC; Östersund/Brunflo IF; Nybro Vikings IF; Tegs SK Hockey; VIK Västerås HK U Hallstahammars HK
- Playing career: 2006–2016

Patrik Wallón (born May 2, 1988, in Skellefteå) is a Swedish ice hockey player. He is currently playing with Skellefteå AIK in the Elitserien.

== Career statistics ==
			Regular season					Playoffs
Season	Team	League	GP	G	A	Pts	PIM	GP	G	A	Pts	PIM
2004–05	Skellefteå AIK J18	J18 Allsvenskan	3	0	1	1	0	—	—	—	—	—
2004–05	Skellefteå AIK J20	J20 SuperElit	16	2	3	5	6	—	—	—	—	—
2004–05	Skellefteå AIK	Allsvenskan	—	—	—	—	—	1	0	0	0	0
2005–06	Skellefteå AIK J18	J18 Allsvenskan	1	0	1	1	0	—	—	—	—	—
2005–06	Skellefteå AIK J20	J20 SuperElit	41	4	9	13	30	—	—	—	—	—
2006–07	Skellefteå AIK J20	J20 SuperElit	42	7	9	16	36	2	1	0	1	16
2006–07	Skellefteå AIK	Elitserien	3	0	0	0	0	—	—	—	—	—
2007–08	Skellefteå AIK J20	J20 SuperElit	34	4	6	10	22	2	0	1	1	0
2007–08	Skellefteå AIK	Elitserien	2	0	0	0	0	—	—	—	—	—
2007–08	Piteå HC	Division 1	3	0	1	1	2	—	—	—	—	—
2008–09	Östersund/Brunflo IF	Division 1	29	4	10	14	34	—	—	—	—	—
2009–10	Nybro Vikings IF	Division 1	26	2	5	7	12	—	—	—	—	—
2009–10	Tegs SK Hockey	Division 2	5	2	6	8	—	—	—	—	—	—
2012–13	VIK Västerås HK U	Division 3	12	2	4	6	14	—	—	—	—	—
2015–16	Hallstahammars HK	Division 2	10	0	2	2	4	—	—	—	—	—
Elitserien totals			5	0	0	0	0	—	—	—	—	—
Division 1 totals			58	6	16	22	48	—	—	—	—	—
