= Kroksjön (Skellefteå Municipality) =

Lake in Västerbotten County, Sweden

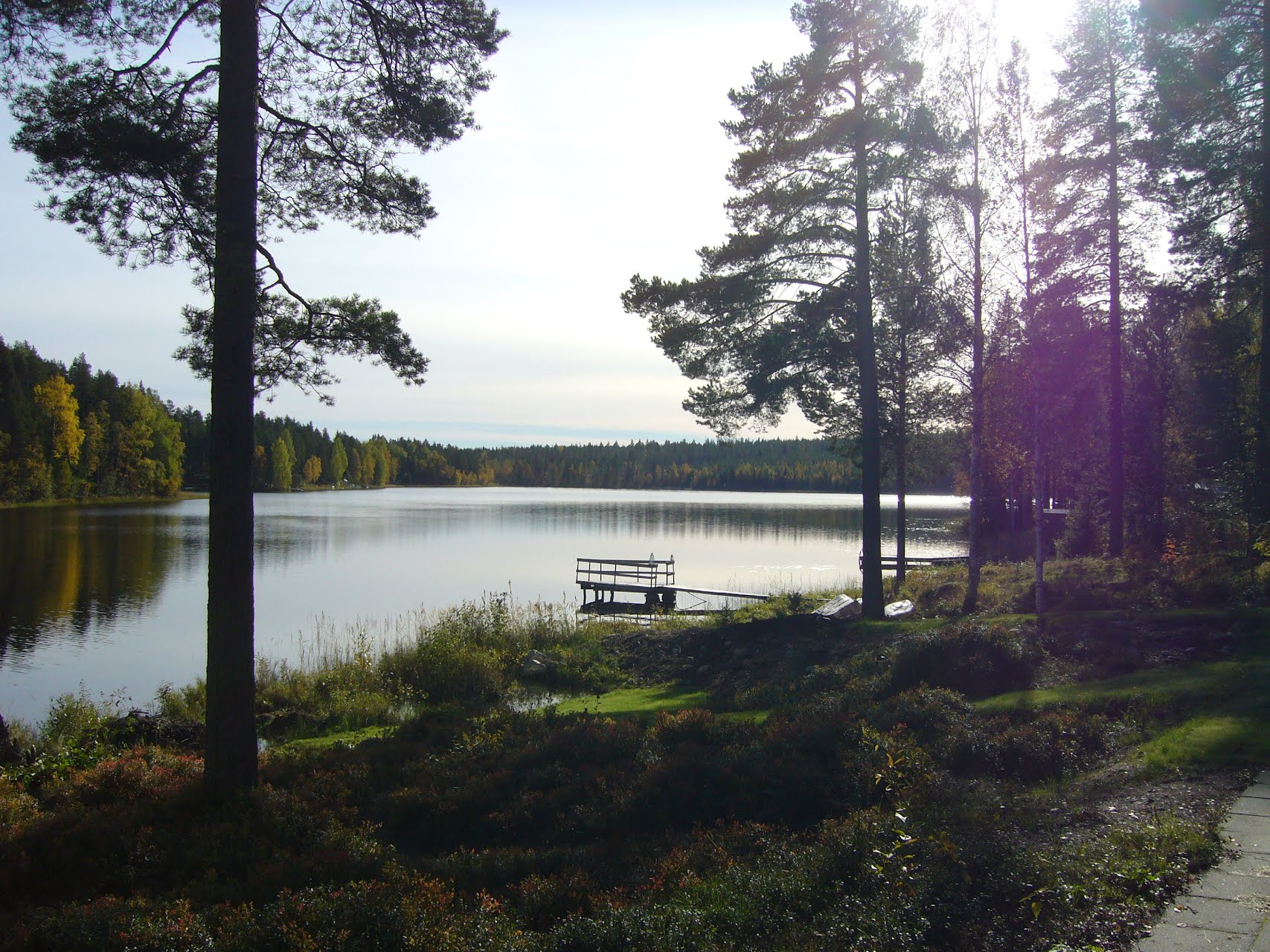

- Location within Västerbotten
- Location: Västerbotten County, Sweden
- Coordinates: 64°45′N 20°57′E
- Basin countries: Sweden

Kroksjön is a small lake southwest of the city of Skellefteå, Sweden. There is a sawmill owned by Holmen and a couple of holiday cottages around the lake. During the last couple of years more and more people are starting to live there all year round.
