= H&M =

Swedish fast fashion retail company

H & M Hennes & Mauritz AB
- Trade name: H&M
- Type: Public
- Traded as: Nasdaq Stockholm: HM B OMX Stockholm 30
- ISIN: SE0000106270
- Industry: Retail
- Founded: 1947; 79 years ago (as Hennes); Västerås, Sweden
- Founder: Erling Persson
- Headquarters: Stockholm, Sweden
- Number of locations: 4,338 stores (2024)
- Area served: Worldwide
- Key people: Karl-Johan Persson (chairman); Daniel Erver (CEO and president)
- Products: Clothing; Accessories
- Brands: COS; & Other Stories; Weekday; Monki; Cheap Monday; ARKET; H&M Home; Afound; Sellpy
- Revenue: ▲US$24.8 billion (2019)
- Operating income: ▼US$1.8 billion (2019)
- Net income: ▲US$1.5 billion (2019)
- Total assets: ▲US$19.3 billion (2019)
- Total equity: ▲US$6.919 billion (2016)
- Owner: Stefan Persson (36%)
- Number of employees: 140,000 (Note: Total full-time equivalent positions; H&M reports do not publish total full-time, part-time and casual employment levels.) (2024)
- Website: hm.com (retail) hmgroup.com (corporate)

H & M Hennes & Mauritz AB, commonly known by its brand name H&M, is a Swedish multinational clothing company headquartered in Stockholm. Built on a fast fashion business model, the retailer sells apparel, accessories, and homeware. The company operates thousands of stores across 75 geographical markets and employs over 171,000 people worldwide.

H&M is the second-largest international clothing retailer after Inditex. H&M was founded by Erling Persson in 1947 under the name Hennes. The CEO of H&M from 2020 to 2024 was Helena Helmersson. The current CEO, as of January 2024, is Daniel Ervér.

== History ==
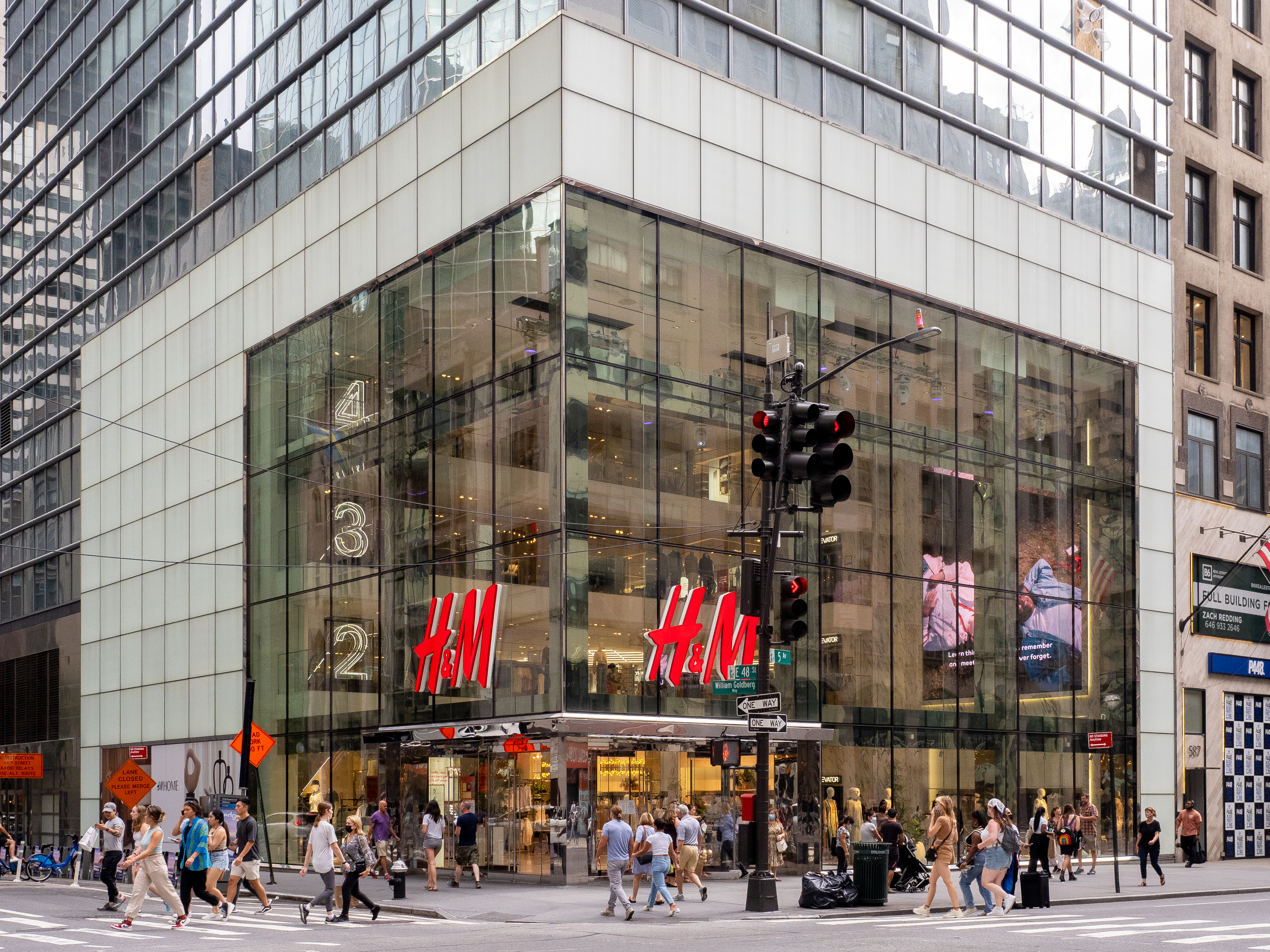
H&M store on Fifth Avenue in New York City

=== Foundation ===
The business was established in 1947 by Erling Persson, when he opened his first shop in Västerås, Sweden. The shop was called Hennes (Swedish for 'hers') and only sold women's clothing. Another store opened in Norway, in 1964. In 1968, Persson acquired the hunting apparel retailer Mauritz Widforss, located in Stockholm, which led to the inclusion of a menswear collection in the product range, and the name was changed to Hennes & Mauritz.

The company was listed on the Stockholm Stock Exchange in 1974. Shortly after, in 1976, the first store outside Scandinavia opened in London. H&M continued to expand in Europe and began to retail online in 1998 with the domain hm.com, which was registered in 1997, according to data available via WHOIS. The opening of its first U.S. store on 31 March 2000 on Fifth Avenue in New York City marked the start of its expansion outside of Europe.

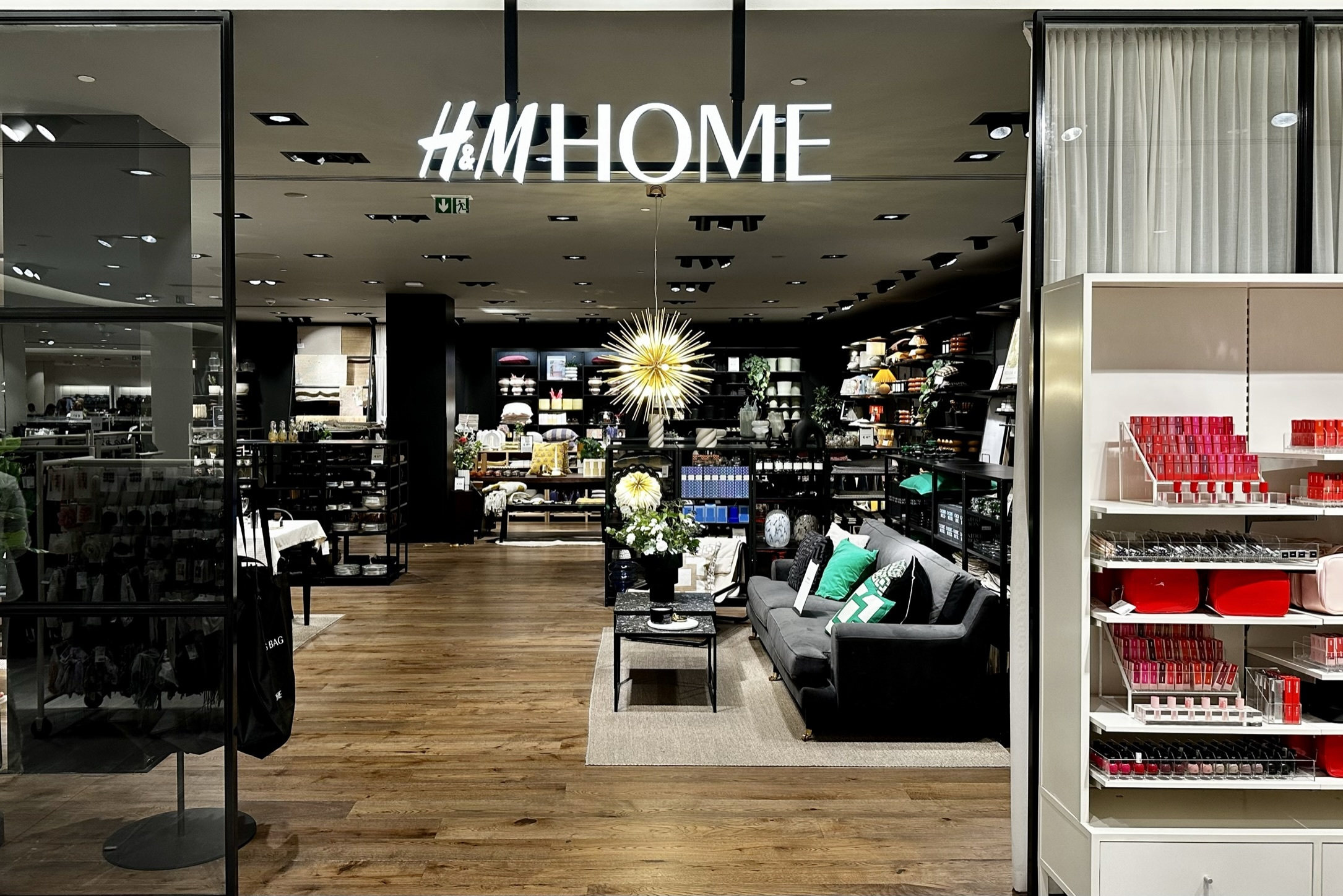
H&M Home section in an Antwerp store

In 2008, the company announced in a press release that it would begin selling home furnishings. While initially distributed online, the home furnishing items are now sold at H&M Home stores worldwide.

Concept stores, including COS, Weekday, Monki and Cheap Monday, were launched following H&M's expansion in Asia. In 2009 and 2010, brand consultancy Interbrand ranked H&M as the twenty-first most-valuable global brand. Its worth was estimated at $12 billion to $16 billion. Under the "H&M with Friends", H&M will partner with Good American, a brand founded by Khloe Kardashian and Emme Grede, to feature their products in H&M's Swedish and German e-commerce shops. In 2017, H&M founded a new concept store Arket. In 2023, H&M launched its clothing line for children and teenagers, called "H&M by Mary Verdawn Sulmeron," exclusively sold for the Philippine market.

H&M operated 2,325 stores at the end of 2011. At the end of August 2012, it was operating 304 more stores, bringing the total to 2,629. In September 2013, the retailer opened its 3000th store in Chengdu, China. In 2023, the company announced that it will enter the Brazilian market in both physical and digital formats, which has been in operation since 2025.

In October 2020, H&M announced that it was planning to close 5% of its worldwide stores in 2021 as a result of the COVID-19 pandemic. The fashion retailer H&M closed 250 shops throughout the globe and moved the majority of its operations online. The H&M Group's sales growth remained at −34% year-over-year from 2020 week 12 to week 22.

Along with hundreds of other global companies, H&M announced on 2 March 2022, an end to retail operations of its more than 150 stores in Russia as a result of the Russian invasion of Ukraine. H&M cited that it stands "with all the people who are suffering" in Ukraine as well as for "the safety of customers and colleagues" in Russia. Having recently expanded via its Weekday and & Other Stories formats, Russia was H&M's sixth-biggest market at the time, representing 4% of group sales in the fourth quarter of 2021. The company also temporarily closed its Ukraine stores, which remain closed as of 2023.

In 2026, H&M established a new production house in Barcelona, Spain, creating a team dedicated to design, sourcing and supplier relations to leverage the city's creative talent and supply chain network.

Due to the growing popularity of GLP-1 weight loss medications in the United States in August 2026, H&M; and other fashion retailers, reduced their plus size clothing lines in response to shifting consumer demand.

== Corporate affairs ==
The key trends for the H&M Group are (as of the financial year ending 30 November):

	Revenue (SEK b) (Note: "Net sales")	Net profit (SEK b) (Note: "Profit after tax")	Share of revenue online (%)	Number of employees (FTE) (k)	Number of stores (Group)	Number of stores (H&M)	Number of served countries (Group) (Note: "markets")	Number of served countries (H&M)	Notes/ sources
2015	180	20.8		104	3,924	3,610	61	61	
2016	192	18.6		114	4,351	3,962	64	64	
2017	200	16.1	12.5	120	4,739	4,288	69	69	
2018	210	12.6	14.5	123	4,968	4,433	71	71	
2019	233	13.4		126	5,076	4,492	74	74	
2020	187	1.2	28	110	5,018	4,429	74	74	
2021	198	11.0	32	107	4,801	4,242	75	75	
2022	223	3.5	30	106	4,465	3,947	79	78	
2023	236	8.7	30	101	4,369	3,872	78	77	
2024	234	11.5	30	97.7	4,253	3,777	79	78	
2025	228	12.0	30	94.7	4,101	3,660	81	81	

== Designers ==
- In November 2004, select stores offered an exclusive collection by fashion designer Karl Lagerfeld. The press reported there were large crowds and that the initial inventories in big cities were sold out within an hour.
- In November 2006, the company launched a collection by Stella McCartney.
- Also in November 2006, the company launched a collection by avant-garde Dutch designers Viktor & Rolf.
- H&M launched a collaboration designed by pop star Madonna in March 2007.
- In November 2007, several months after collaborating with Madonna, the company launched a collection by Italian designer Roberto Cavalli.
- Finnish company Marimekko was chosen as a guest designer in spring 2008.
- H&M partnered with Comme des Garçons, a Japanese fashion label, in the fall of 2008. Products in the collection included accessories, a unisex fragrance, and clothing for adults and children.
- For spring and summer of 2009, British designer Matthew Williamson created two exclusive ranges for the company – the first being a collection of women's clothes that were released in select stores. For the second collection, Williamson ventured into creating menswear for the first time. It featured swimwear for men and women and was available in all of H&M's stores worldwide.
- On 14 November 2009, the company released a limited-edition diffusion collection by Jimmy Choo featuring handbags and shoes for men and women, with prices ranging from £30 to £170. The collection also included clothing designed by Choo, such as garments made of suede and leather, and was available in 200 stores worldwide, including London's Oxford Circus store.
- Sonia Rykiel collaborated with the company by designing a ladies knitwear and lingerie range that was released in select company stores on 5 December 2009.
- French fashion house Lanvin collaborated with H&M to create a new collection, "Lanvin Hearts H&M," in fall 2010. The collection, designed to make Lanvin clothing more accessible to the average consumer, featured items that were around 100 euros. Usually Lanvin dresses would cost hundreds of euros more.
- For Spring and Summer 2011, the company worked with fashion blogger Elin Kling, whose collection was only available at select stores.
- H&M announced a collaboration with Versace in June 2011 that was later released on 19 November. Versace also planned a Spring collaboration with the company that would only be available in countries with online sales. Similar to past collaborations, Versace agreed to let H&M use its name for a previously agreed-upon sum, without actually having a role in the design process.
- H&M announced a collaboration with Marni in November 2011. The campaign launched a few months later in March 2012 and was led by director Sofia Coppola.
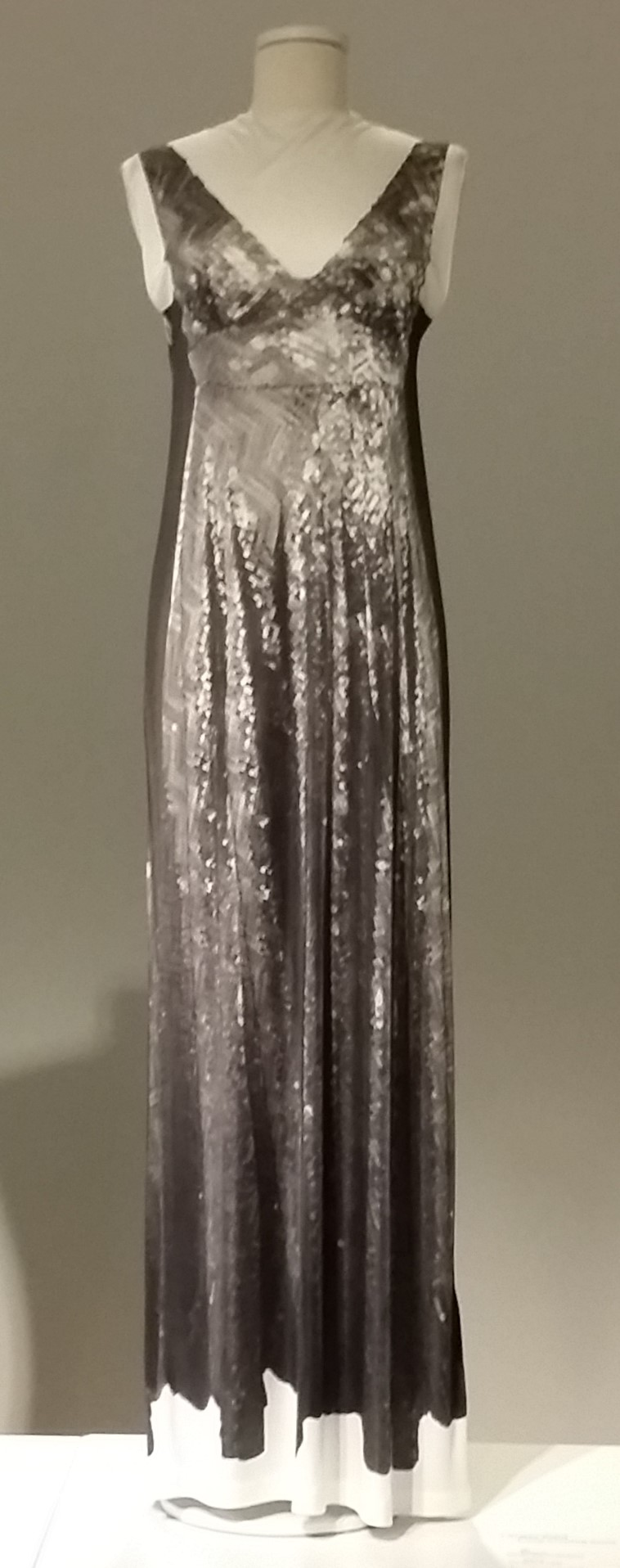
  Trompe-l'œil-printed viscose jersey dress by Maison Martin Margiela for H&M, 2012
- On 4 October 2012, Vogue Japan editor Anna Dello Russo launched an accessories collection with H&M as Paris Fashion Week drew to an end. The collection was stocked in 140 H&M stores worldwide and was also available to purchase online.
- On 12 June 2012, H&M confirmed that it would launch a collaboration with avant-garde label Maison Martin Margiela for a fall rollout. The Maison Martin Margiela collection for H&M hit stores a few months later on 15 November 2012.
- Isabel Marant was a collaboration designer for fall 2013 and, for the first time in her career, made a few men's pieces to accompany the women's collection. The collection sold out very quickly in cities across the globe and was heavily anchored in sales online.
- During the Coachella Valley Music and Arts Festival in California, H&M announced its first collaboration with an American designer. Alexander Wang was the designer chosen and the collection was released to a select 250 stores around the world on 6 November 2014.
- Balmain was announced as the next collaboration with H&M through Balmain designer Olivier Rousteing's Instagram page. The collection was released on 5 November 2015. That year's H&M Christmas campaign was made in collaboration with popstar Katy Perry, who also sang the commercial soundtrack "'Every Day Is A Holiday".
- In November 2016, H&M released a designer line in collaboration with Kenzo. That year the company released an annual holiday movie directed by Wes Anderson as part of the company's Christmas advertising campaign. Titled "Come Together", the short film starred Adrien Brody as a train conductor who saves Christmas after a blizzard delays the train's arrival and causes the few passengers to miss part of the holiday.
- Swedish singer Zara Larsson designed a "playful, young, empowering and little glamorous" collection with H&M in February 2017.
- After 20 years, Naomi Campbell came back to collaborate with the company for a global female empowerment commercial spot in fall 2017. She wore clothes that blurred the line between masculine and feminine in the campaign's Tokyo spot-video where she lip-synced "Wham Rap (Enjoy What You Do)" by Wham!.
- Designers Jeremy Scott and Moschino collaborated with the brand in April 2018.
- With the idea of reviving the spirit of the swinging sixties, H&M collaborated with designer Richard Allan in July 2019.
- The Fleur du Soleil collection, part of H&M's collaboration with Lebanese designer Sandra Mansour, was released in August 2020 and marked the first time the company had partnered with an Arab designer.
- Irish designer Simone Rocha, daughter of designer John Rocha, was announced as a collaborative partner in March 2021. Rocha's designs launched with an H&M campaign film and images shot by Tyler Mitchell.

== Environmental issues and initiatives ==
=== Recycling, circulation, and waste ===
On 6 January 2010, it was reported that unsold or refunded clothing and other items in one New York City H&M store were cut up before being discarded, presumably to prevent resale or use.

In February 2013, H&M began offering patrons a voucher in exchange for used clothing. Donated garments were to be processed by I:CO, a retailer that repurposes and recycles used clothing with the goal of creating a zero waste economy. The initiative is similar to an April 2012 clothes-collection voucher program launched by Marks & Spencer in partnership with Oxfam.

H&M produces 3 billion garments a year, not all of which is sold to consumers. As of 2019, it was in possession of just over $4 billion worth of unsold clothing.

To further promote recycling, the brand appointed actress Maisie Williams as a global sustainability ambassador in April 2021, to front a campaign promoting the goal of using all recycled or sustainably sourced materials by 2030. This campaign began with an Animal Crossing collaboration featuring Williams as a digital game character to teach the virtues of recycling. The company also introduced a 2021 pilot program in the UK and US that allowed men to rent suits for job interviews.

=== Material sourcing and biodiversity ===
H&M joined Zara and other apparel companies in changing their supply chain to avoid damaging ecosystems. In 2014, the company partnered with the nonprofit Canopy to remove dissolvable pulp from endangered and ancient forests for its viscose and rayon fabrics. In response to the 2019 Amazon rainforest wildfires, H&M temporarily halted leather purchases from Brazil. The company issued an email statement: "The ban will be active until there are credible assurance systems in place to verify that the leather does not contribute to environmental harm in the Amazon." H&M imports only a small fraction of its leather needs from the country.

The company also introduced bans on specific animal products. Following a 2019 announcement to phase out wool from mulesed sheep, H&M reported a full phase-out by 2025. While 90% of the company's down and feathers were recycled as of 2024, H&M committed to eliminating all virgin down and feathers by the end of 2025.

=== The H&M Foundation ===
Established in 2014 with an initial $180 million investment from the Persson family, the H&M Foundation is a nonprofit that funds humanitarian and environmental projects. These include the Green Machine, a technology that would allow clothing to be recycled in a similar way to aluminum cans. In August 2015, the foundation announced that it will award the Global Change Award, an annual million-euro prize to advance recycling technology and techniques within the fashion industry. According to the Organisation for Economic Cooperation and Development (OECD), H&M Foundation's financing for 2019 increased by 7% to US$17 million.

=== Greenwashing allegations ===
The company's sustainability claims have faced legal and regulatory scrutiny. A US class-action lawsuit alleging that H&M's Conscious Choice range was greenwashing was dismissed. However, the Norwegian Consumer Authority (Forbrukertilsynet), issued a warning to H&M regarding environmental marketing claims, citing concerns that its data did not sufficiently support the products' environmentally friendly branding. It had previously stated that it believed another clothing company, Norrøna, was "breaking the law" by using similar marketing claims.

== Concept stores ==
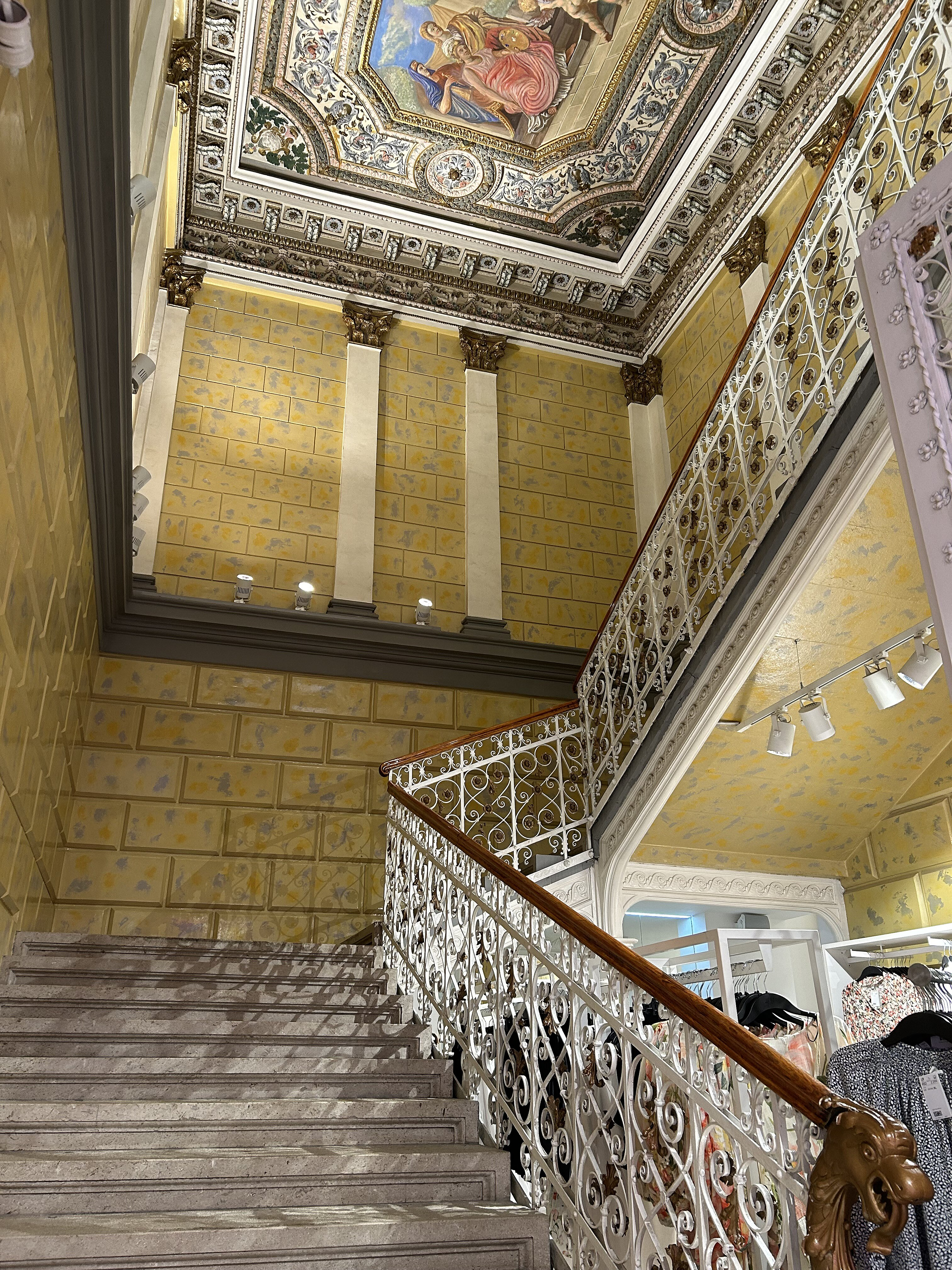
H&M store in Novi Sad, Serbia

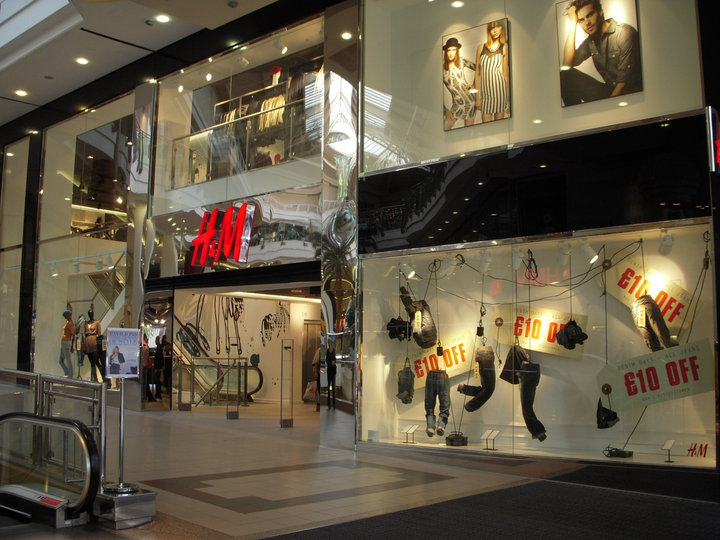
H&M store at the Pavilions Shopping Centre, Birmingham, UK

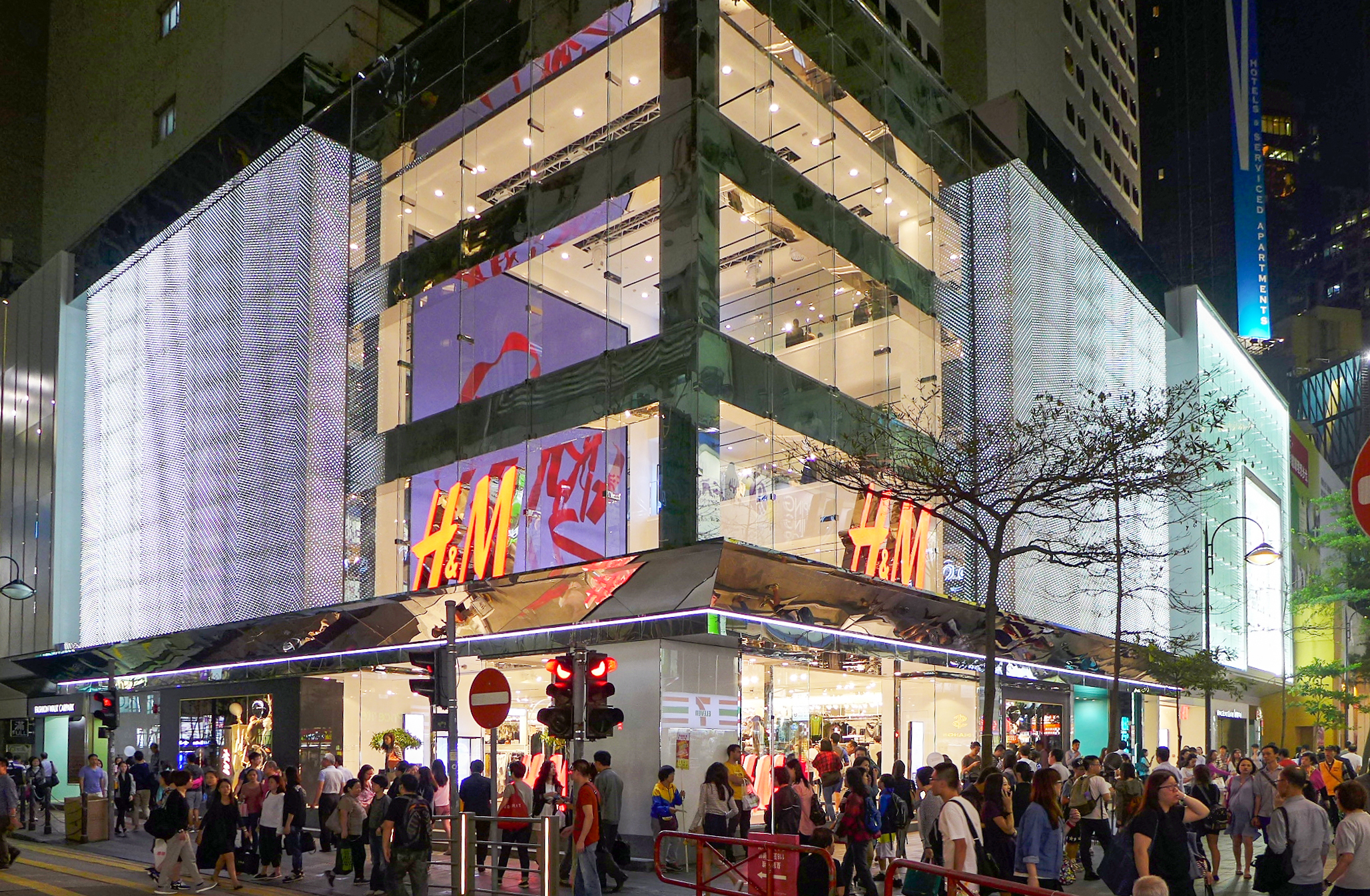
H&M Asia flagship store at Causeway Bay, Hong Kong

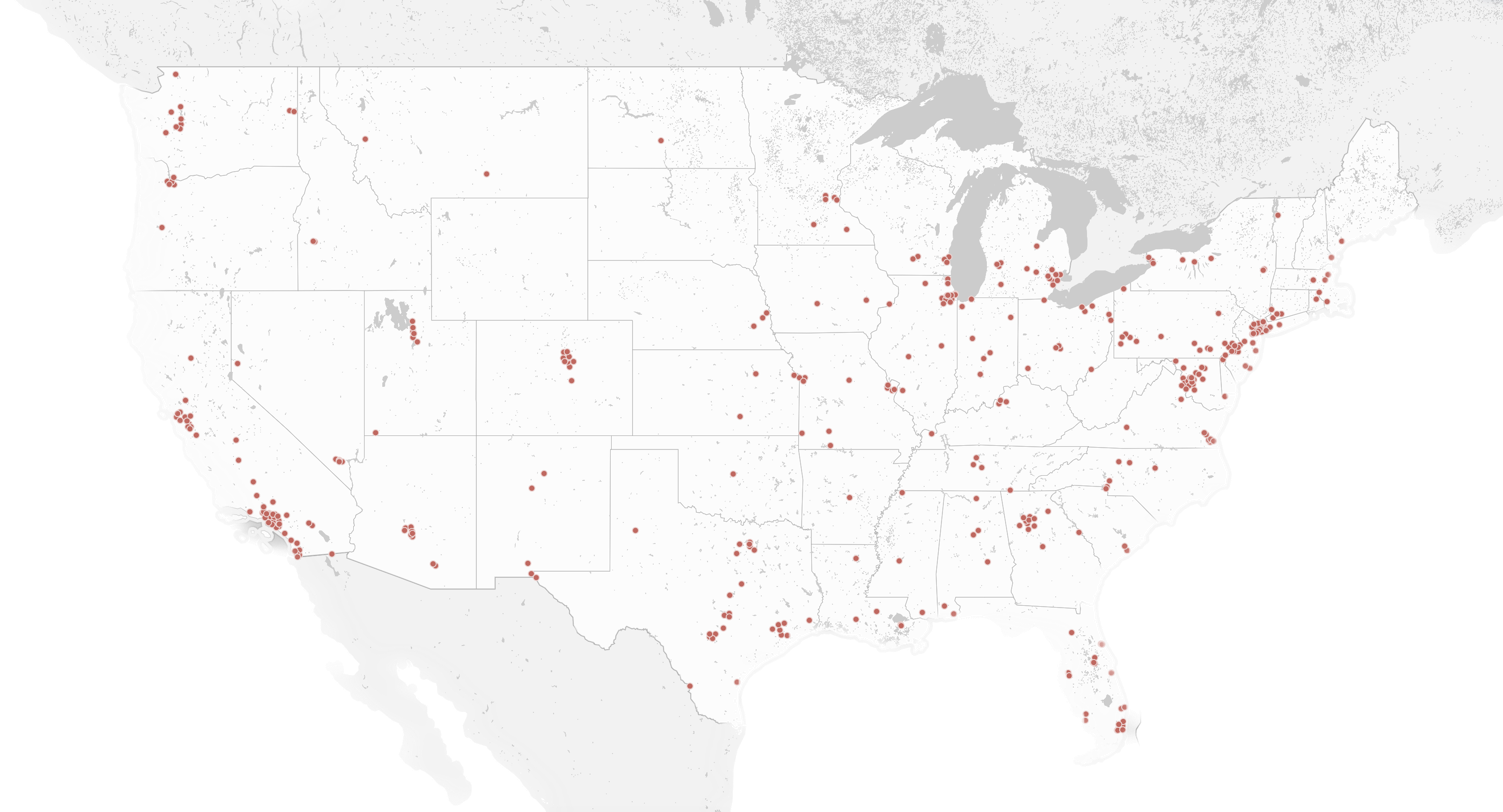
Map of H&M stores in the U.S. as of April 2023

=== Six concept brands ===
In addition to the H&M brand, the company consists of six individual brands with separate concepts. Brands include Afound, Arket, COS, Monki, Weekday, and & Other Stories.

==== COS ====
COS launched its flagship store on London's Regent Street in March 2007 with a catwalk show at the Royal Academy. Its concept is encompassed by minimalist style inspired by architecture, graphics, and design.

== Labor practices ==
=== Working conditions ===
==== Cambodia ====
In August 2011, nearly 300 workers fainted in one week at a Cambodian factory supplying H&M. Fumes from chemicals, poor ventilation, malnutrition, and even "mass hysteria" have all been blamed for making workers ill. The minimum wage in the country is the equivalent of $66 (£42) a month, an amount that is less than half of what is required to meet basic needs, according to human rights groups.

==== Bangladesh ====
The same year, Bangladeshi and international labor groups put forth a detailed safety proposal that entailed the establishment of independent inspections of garment factories. The plan called for inspectors to have the power to close unsafe factories. The proposal entailed a legally binding contract between suppliers, customers, and unions. At a meeting in 2011 in Dhaka, major European and North American retailers, including H&M, rejected the proposal. Further efforts by unions to advance the proposal after numerous and deadly factory fires have been rejected.

==== Myanmar ====
A report by the Business and Human Rights Resource Centre (BHRRC) found a significant rise in worker abuse allegations in Myanmar garment factories since the military coup in 2021. H&M is investigating 20 such cases at its suppliers, while a report documented 156 in total over the past year. This has led some fashion brands like Inditex (Zara owner) to cut ties with Myanmar suppliers, while others like H&M and Bestseller are increasing monitoring efforts. The decision to stay or leave is complex, with some arguing continued engagement offers leverage for improvement, while others fear a race to the bottom if major brands exit.

=== Supply chain transparency ===
The Guardian wrote that in a conscious action sustainability report for 2012, H&M published a list of factories supplying 95% of its garments. This contributes to the trend of corporations leaning toward ethically transparent supply chains.

=== Slave and child labour ===
On 2 January 2013, The Ecologist reported allegations by Anti-Slavery International that H&M was continuing its association with the Uzbek government in exploiting child and adult forced labour as cotton harvesters in Uzbekistan.

In September 2020, amid international allegations over the use of Uyghur forced labor in Xinjiang, H&M published a statement saying that it had stopped buying cotton from growers in Xinjiang, stating that it was "deeply concerned by reports from civil society organisations and media that include accusations of forced labor and discrimination of ethno-religious minorities".

In February 2017, The Guardian reported children were employed to make H&M products in Myanmar and were paid 13p (about 15 cents US) an hour – half the full legal minimum wage.

Since then, H&M has become a Fair Labour Association (FLA) member and has set a goal to achieve fair living wages throughout its supply chain by 2030.

=== Factory building structural collapses ===
==== Savar building, Bangladesh ====
In April 2013, the Rana Plaza building collapsed in Bangladesh killing over 1,100 people. Fatalities were mostly garment workers. The incident is considered the deadliest non-deliberate structural failure accident and the deadliest garment factory disaster in modern history. The eight-story building complex that was not designed for factory production and had cracks in the structure that the owners ignored. Approximately 2,500 injured people were rescued from the rubble.

The company and other retailers signed on to the Accord on Factory and Building Safety in Bangladesh. In June 2016, SumOfUs launched a campaign to pressure H&M to honor the commitment it made and signed to protect Bangladesh's garment workers. SumOfUs alleged that "H&M is drastically behind schedule in fixing the safety hazards its workers have to face every day."

==== Phnom Penh, Cambodia ====
On 19 May 2013, a textile factory that produced apparel for H&M in Phnom Penh, Cambodia collapsed, injuring several people. The incident has raised concerns regarding industrial safety regulations.

=== Living wage ===
On 25 November 2013, H&M's global head of sustainability committed that H&M, as the world's second-largest clothing retailer, would aim to pay all textile workers "living wage" by 2018, stating that governments are responding too slowly to poor working conditions in Bangladesh among other Asian countries where many clothing retailers source a majority if not all of its garments. Wages were increased in Bangladesh from 3,000 takas ($40) to 5,300 takas ($70) a month in late 2013.

As of October 2018, a report from the Business and Human Rights Centre show that adequate wages and overtime payment practices do not live up to the conditions promised by H&M in 2013 based on interviews with 62 workers in six H&M supplier factories in Bulgaria, Turkey, India and Cambodia. On 13 July 2019, H&M docked the pay and suspended several unionized staff in three of its stores in New Zealand for wearing 'Living wage' stickers, as part of a wider industrial dispute. As of 2025, it was reported that 97% of fashion brands including H&M do not pay supply chain workers a living wage.

=== Fire safety report ===
In September 2015, CleanClothes.org, an NGO involved in garment labor working conditions, reported on a lack of specific fire safety renovations in H&M suppliers' factories.

=== Xinjiang region ===
In 2020, the Australian Strategic Policy Institute accused 82 major brands, including H&M, of being connected to alleged forced Uyghur labor in Xinjiang Uyghur Autonomous Region (XUAR). Specifically the report mentions H&M as a customer of Huafu Top Dyed Melange Yarn Co. Ltd. See also: §Boycotts by China. The evidence adduced was that between April 2017 and June 2018 2,048 Uyghur workers were taken "from Hotan Prefecture in Xinjiang to 15 factories in Anhui Province, including [a] Huafu [factory]", and that H&M listed Huafu as a supplier.

On 16 September 2020, H&M said it was ending its relationship with Huafu. It further stated that it had "never had a business relationship with a mill owned by the yarn producer Huafu Fashion Co in Anhui province where workers from XUAR have been employed".

== Controversies ==
=== China ===
In March 2021, following joint sanctions by the EU, UK, US, and Canada against China over reports of human rights abuses in Xinjiang, H&M's stance on avoiding forced labor and its claim that it would no longer use cotton produced there were discovered and criticized by the Communist Youth League of China on its official Weibo page. Their post stated, "Spreading rumors to boycott Xinjiang cotton, while trying to make a profit in China? Wishful thinking!" This post went viral and resulted in a public boycott. Chinese e-commerce platforms, app stores, and rideshare apps blocked H&M, while brand ambassadors Huang Xuan and Victoria Song, announced they were no longer collaborating with H&M.

On 31 March, H&M responded with a statement vowing to rebuild trust in China and serve its customers in a "respectful way". However, media reports indicated that H&M did not issue a direct apology but instead attempted to “blur the issue.” Chinese state media outlet China Global Television Network countered the statements against Xinjiang cotton with a video showing automation in cotton-picking and local Uyghurs claiming that the industry brought high earnings. The US government condemned the state-backed boycott, while Chinese Foreign Ministry spokesperson Hua Chunying defended the consumers' actions.

H&M’s sales in China reportedly fell by approximately 23% during the second quarter of 2021 and 40% in the third quarter. The company stopped publishing detailed financial reports for the Chinese market after 2021. In August 2022, H&M resumed sales in China. Despite this, the brand's image remained damaged.

=== Israel ===
H&M has operated stores in Israel since March 2010 with its first store in Tel Aviv in partnership with local franchisee Match Retail, a division of Union Group. As of December 2023, H&M operates 24 stores in Israel, predominantly around the region of Gush Dan. H&M does not operate any stores in the occupied areas of East Jerusalem or the West Bank.

However, since opening in Israel, the Palestinian branch of BDS has campaigned for boycott of fashion chain, demanding that it pull out of the country. H&M's continuing presence in Israel has led to protests in various stores in Europe, especially since the attack on Israel on October 7th. The company initially closed its stores, however the company reopened its stores since.

In January 2016, H&M released and later pulled a beige and dark blue striped scarf from its Israeli stores, after it was accused of being offensive due to its resemblance to the Jewish prayer shawl, or tallit.

=== Australia ===
In January 2024, the company was heavily criticized for inappropriate sexualisation of children after its Australian branch released a school uniform advertisement with the slogan "Make those heads turn in H&M’s Back to School fashion". Melinda Tankard Reist, an Australian writer, questioned the brand's motives, claiming that young girls just want to be left alone and don't want unwelcome attention. The company removed the advertisement and apologized.

=== Cultural appropriation and racism ===
In August 2013, H&M withdrew faux-leather headdresses from its Canadian stores after consumers complained the items, part of the company's "summer music festival" collection, were insulting to Canada's Aboriginal peoples. On 6 November 2015, H&M South Africa division was accused of racism for its lack of black models in its photoshoots, later stating that white models convey a more "positive Image."

In 2018, H&M showcased a black child model wearing a green hoodie reading "Coolest Monkey in the Jungle" on its official United Kingdom website, which sparked controversy. This was especially so in the United States due to the use of the term "monkey" on a black person. In response, Canadian and American singers such as The Weeknd and G-Eazy boycotted the company by ending their partnerships with it over the image. H&M later released an apology: "This image has now been removed from all H&M channels and we apologise to anyone this may have offended." The mother of the model urged people to "stop crying wolf," deeming it "an unnecessary issue." After the allegations, H&M stores were vandalized and looted in South Africa. In response, H&M temporarily closed stores there.

On 9 December 2020, Sweden's Equality Ombudsman (DO) started an investigation into H&M following a media report accusing it of racism in Swedish stores.

=== Alleged plagiarism ===
On 24 January 2012, H&M was reported to have stolen the work of a UK-based artist, Tori LaConsay, using it on multiple items without compensating her. The company did not admit fault but said they would be in contact the artist to "dialogue" with her directly.

== See also ==
- Bonds (clothing)
- European Retail Round Table
- Gap Inc.
- List of companies of Sweden
- Shein
- Zara (retailer)
