= Skellefteå Innebandy IF =

Floorball club in Skellefteå, Sweden

- Full name: Skellefteå Innebandy idrottsförening
- Short name: SIIF
- Founded: 1986
- Arena: Eddahallen

Skellefteå Innebandy IF is a floorball club in Skellefteå, Sweden, established in 1986. The women's team debuted in the SSL in the 2006-2007 season.
