= Skellefteå =

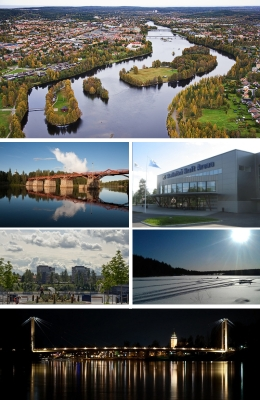
- Skellefteå in images

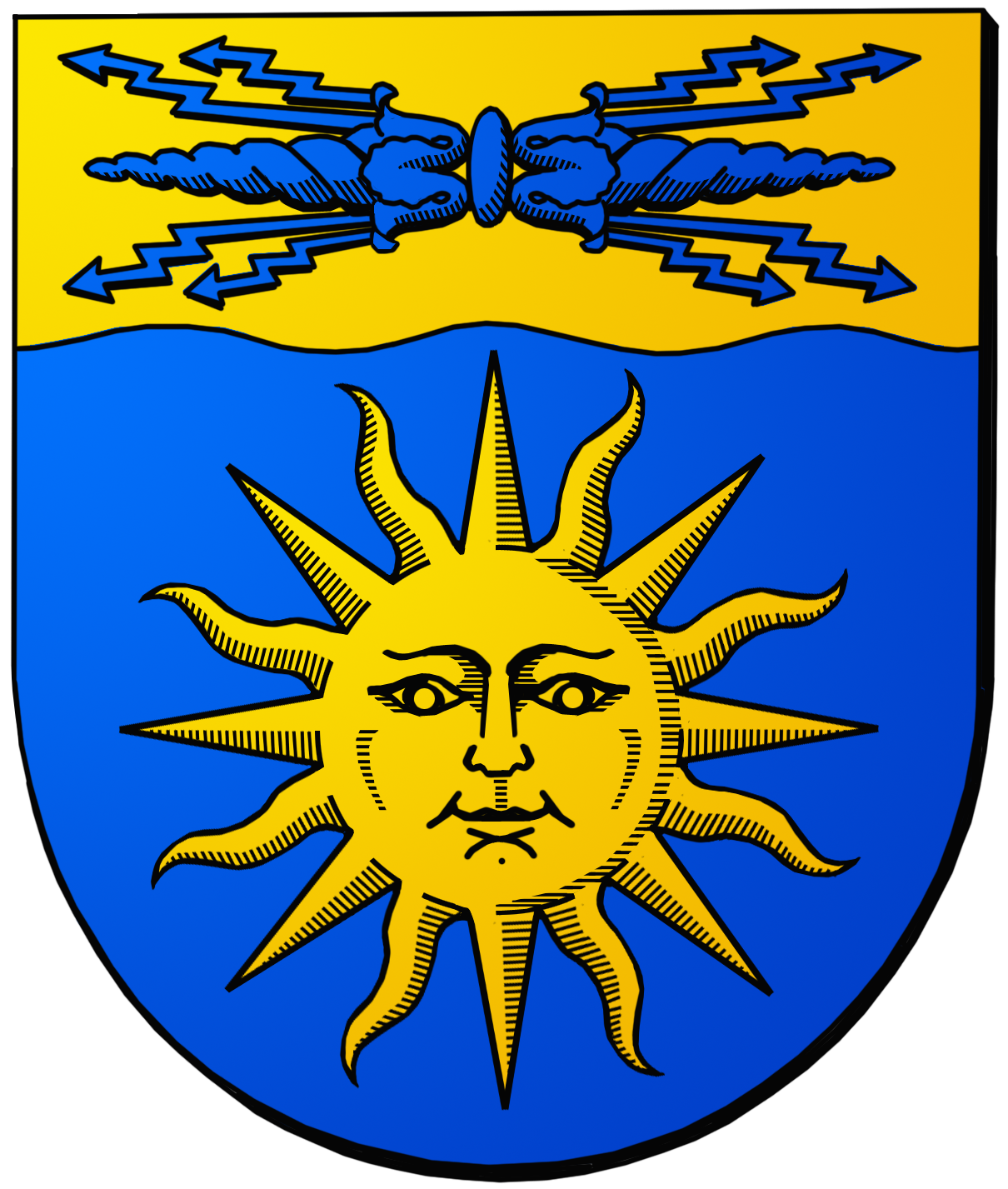
- Coat of arms
- Nicknames: Guldstaden (Goldtown), Skellhell
- Location within Västerbotten Location within Sweden
- Coordinates: 64°45′N 20°57′E
- Country: Sweden
- Province: Västerbotten
- County: Västerbotten County
- Municipality: Skellefteå Municipality

Area
  - Total: 24.44 km^{2} (9.44 sq mi)

Population (2020)
  - Total: 36,388
  - Density: 1,489/km^{2} (3,856/sq mi)
- Time zone: UTC+1 (CET)
  - Summer (DST): UTC+2 (CEST)
- Area code: +46 0910

Skellefteå (Swedish: [ɧɛˈlɛ̌ftɛɔ], locally [ʂɛˈlɛ̌ftɛ]; Meänkieli: Heletti) is a city in Västerbotten County, Sweden, with a population of 36,388. It is the seat of Skellefteå Municipality, which had 77,322 inhabitants in 2024.

The city is historically industrial, with mining being a large part of that industry, especially for gold, leading to the city being nicknamed Guldstaden ("gold town"). Politically, Skellefteå is a Social Democratic stronghold. The city is a well-known ice hockey town, with its main team Skellefteå AIK playing in the Swedish top division: the SHL, which they have won on several occasions; most recently in 2026.

The city was incorporated in 1845 and grew to its current population size in the 1950s and 1960s, growing only slowly since. It is the second largest city in Västerbotten after Umeå and is located roughly halfway between it and Luleå. The Skellefte River passes through the city and it is located around 15 kilometres (9.3 mi) from the Bothnian Bay open sea. Skellefteå is served by Skellefteå Airport, IATA airport code SFT but locally known as Falmark because of the village nearby, also around 15 kilometres (9.3 mi) from the city centre to the south.

== History ==
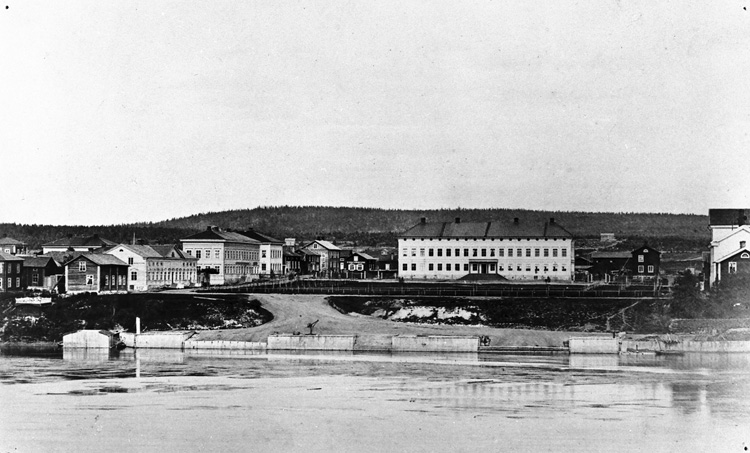
An overview of Skellefteå and City Hall (center) in 1870

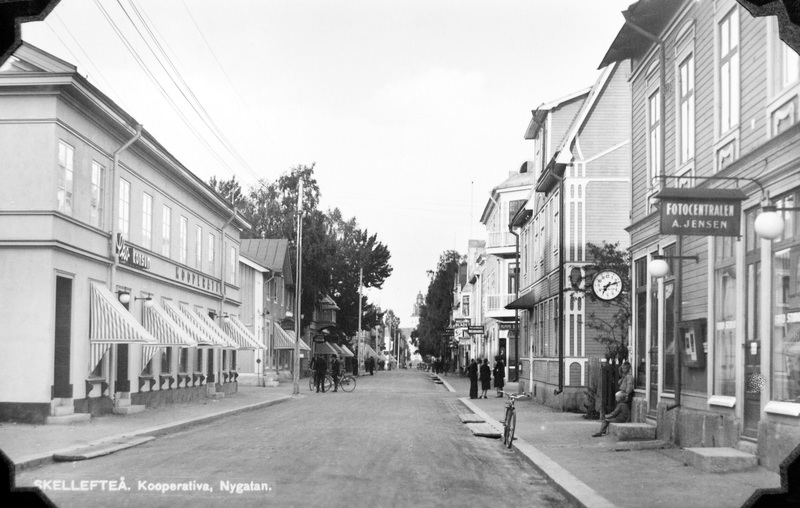
A street, Nygatan, Skellefteå, 1927

The name Skellefteå is recorded to having been spelled as Skelepht in 1327. On Carta marina the name is spelt Skellitta. The origin of the name remains unknown, but is assumed to be of Sami origin.

From the 14th century on, attempts were made to Christianize Skellefteå. A parish was formed and a church built. However, for the most part, the entire large Northern Swedish territory of Norrland was not Christianized until several hundred years after the rest of Sweden, and many northern areas such as Skellefteå remained unexplored well past the Middle Ages.

Not before the very end of the 17th century did the indigenous Sami people of Northern Sweden begin turning to Christianity, much due to the efforts by the Northern Swedish superintendent Mathias Steuchius, who worked hard to accomplish this. Several Sami shamans were killed for this reason.

Eventually, the reason for the sudden awakened interest towards Skellefteälven and the surrounding areas was the great northern fishing grounds of salmon.

The actual city of Skellefteå is one of the youngest cities of Norrland. It was founded in 1845 by the vicar Nils Nordlander.

== Economy ==
Major industries include:

- Boliden AB, a big mining and smelting company
- Skellefteå Kraft, largest power company in Skellefteå
- Northvolt, lithium-ion battery cell manufacturing company

The city became home of a massive battery plant made by Northvolt in 2021. Northvolt announced layoffs in September 2024, and filed for bankruptcy in March 2025.

The largest private employer in Skellefteå is the mining company Boliden AB, with about 1,200 employees. The mine's copper ore contains particles of gold, silver and platinum. Skellefteå is still referred to as the "Goldtown".

During the 1990s, the computer industry flourished, subsidiaries of Ericsson and Tieto Enator becoming important employers.

== Climate ==
Skellefteå has a subarctic climate (Dfc) with mild summers and cold, long and snowy winters. The climate is somewhat moderated by the Bothnia Bay, although maritime effects are limited, ensuring warm summer temperatures for a coastal area so far north. In the last century, as part of global climate warming, an increase in summer temperatures as well as an earlier arrival of spring and a later onset of winter have been observed. Precipitation is moderate, the maximum precipitation is in the second half of summer. The difference in average hours of sunshine between months is large: December has very little due to both very short days and high cloud cover, while June has a lot due to long days and relatively clear weather.

Climate data for Skellefteå airport (1991-2020)
| Month | Jan | Feb | Mar | Apr | May | Jun | Jul | Aug | Sep | Oct | Nov | Dec | Year |
|---|---|---|---|---|---|---|---|---|---|---|---|---|---|
| Mean daily maximum °C (°F) | −3.8 (25.2) | −3.5 (25.7) | 1.2 (34.2) | 6.7 (44.1) | 13.2 (55.8) | 18.4 (65.1) | 21.1 (70.0) | 19.3 (66.7) | 13.8 (56.8) | 6.4 (43.5) | 0.9 (33.6) | −1.8 (28.8) | 7.7 (45.9) |
| Daily mean °C (°F) | −7.2 (19.0) | −7.4 (18.7) | −3.3 (26.1) | 2.0 (35.6) | 8.0 (46.4) | 13.3 (55.9) | 16.4 (61.5) | 14.8 (58.6) | 9.6 (49.3) | 3.4 (38.1) | −1.6 (29.1) | −4.9 (23.2) | 3.6 (38.5) |
| Mean daily minimum °C (°F) | −11.5 (11.3) | −11.8 (10.8) | −7.9 (17.8) | −2.7 (27.1) | 2.7 (36.9) | 8.4 (47.1) | 11.7 (53.1) | 10.2 (50.4) | 5.6 (42.1) | 0.3 (32.5) | −4.6 (23.7) | −8.5 (16.7) | −0.7 (30.7) |
| Average precipitation mm (inches) | 44.0 (1.73) | 33.4 (1.31) | 33.7 (1.33) | 30.3 (1.19) | 39.3 (1.55) | 55.9 (2.20) | 72.5 (2.85) | 68.9 (2.71) | 58.7 (2.31) | 63.6 (2.50) | 58.5 (2.30) | 53.4 (2.10) | 612.2 (24.10) |
Source: SMHI Timeseries with normals for 1991-2020

Climate data for Skellefteå Airport (2006–2020 averages, extremes 1970–1992 & 2006–2020 & snow depth from Kusmark)
| Month | Jan | Feb | Mar | Apr | May | Jun | Jul | Aug | Sep | Oct | Nov | Dec | Year |
|---|---|---|---|---|---|---|---|---|---|---|---|---|---|
| Record high °C (°F) | 8.5 (47.3) | 10.2 (50.4) | 15.1 (59.2) | 21.5 (70.7) | 29.2 (84.6) | 34.0 (93.2) | 32.4 (90.3) | 30.7 (87.3) | 23.3 (73.9) | 20.3 (68.5) | 12.5 (54.5) | 10.2 (50.4) | 34.0 (93.2) |
| Mean maximum °C (°F) | 4.3 (39.7) | 4.8 (40.6) | 8.8 (47.8) | 14.6 (58.3) | 23.8 (74.8) | 27.1 (80.8) | 28.0 (82.4) | 26.4 (79.5) | 20.0 (68.0) | 13.7 (56.7) | 7.9 (46.2) | 5.3 (41.5) | 29.3 (84.7) |
| Mean daily maximum °C (°F) | −4.0 (24.8) | −3.5 (25.7) | 1.6 (34.9) | 7.1 (44.8) | 13.7 (56.7) | 18.6 (65.5) | 21.2 (70.2) | 19.6 (67.3) | 14.2 (57.6) | 6.8 (44.2) | 1.6 (34.9) | −0.9 (30.4) | 8.0 (46.4) |
| Daily mean °C (°F) | −7.8 (18.0) | −7.8 (18.0) | −3.1 (26.4) | 2.4 (36.3) | 8.5 (47.3) | 13.5 (56.3) | 16.4 (61.5) | 14.9 (58.8) | 10.1 (50.2) | 3.7 (38.7) | −1.2 (29.8) | −4.3 (24.3) | 3.8 (38.8) |
| Mean daily minimum °C (°F) | −11.6 (11.1) | −12.0 (10.4) | −7.8 (18.0) | −2.3 (27.9) | 3.2 (37.8) | 8.4 (47.1) | 11.6 (52.9) | 10.2 (50.4) | 6.0 (42.8) | 0.6 (33.1) | −4.0 (24.8) | −7.6 (18.3) | −0.4 (31.2) |
| Mean minimum °C (°F) | −25.3 (−13.5) | −25.3 (−13.5) | −21.0 (−5.8) | −9.7 (14.5) | −4.0 (24.8) | 0.8 (33.4) | 6.0 (42.8) | 3.5 (38.3) | −1.3 (29.7) | −8.2 (17.2) | −14.4 (6.1) | −19.3 (−2.7) | −28.7 (−19.7) |
| Record low °C (°F) | −35.3 (−31.5) | −36.9 (−34.4) | −32.5 (−26.5) | −18.4 (−1.1) | −6.6 (20.1) | −1.7 (28.9) | 3.2 (37.8) | −1.9 (28.6) | −6.1 (21.0) | −18.1 (−0.6) | −27.7 (−17.9) | −37.1 (−34.8) | −37.1 (−34.8) |
| Average precipitation mm (inches) | 44.3 (1.74) | 34.3 (1.35) | 31.8 (1.25) | 29.4 (1.16) | 44.9 (1.77) | 58.7 (2.31) | 71.2 (2.80) | 62.1 (2.44) | 64.2 (2.53) | 61.6 (2.43) | 52.2 (2.06) | 58.0 (2.28) | 612.7 (24.12) |
| Average extreme snow depth cm (inches) | 47 (19) | 58 (23) | 61 (24) | 45 (18) | 3 (1.2) | 0 (0) | 0 (0) | 0 (0) | 0 (0) | 6 (2.4) | 15 (5.9) | 35 (14) | 67 (26) |
Source 1: SMHI Open Data for Skellefteå Airport, precipitation
Source 2: SMHI Open Data for Skellefteå Airport, temperature

== Transportation ==
The European route E4 highway provides the main road connection to the city, providing direct connections to cities like Stockholm and Sundsvall going south and Luleå going north. Riksväg 95 also serves the city.

There is a railway branch line running through Skellefteå, although with no passenger traffic, making it the largest city in Sweden without it. The line is still served by Freight traffic. There were plans to start night trains going from Stockholm to Skellefteå, with service being expected to commence in April 2022. Due to a decision from Trafikverket, the planned night trains were cancelled before they started running. The closest train station in use is located in Bastuträsk, from which trains heading to several cities including Stockholm, Umeå and Luleå depart, operated by Norrtåg and Vy. There goes a bus to Skellefteå from Bastuträsk, intended for transfers to and from the trains.

The High-speed rail line Norrbotniabanan is planned to go through the city, providing it with rail service for the first time since 1990. As a part of this, a new station will be constructed close to the city centre. Service is expected to begin in 2030.

== Sports ==
- Skellefteå AIK, an ice hockey team in the highest Swedish league, Swedish Hockey League (SHL). 1978, 2013, 2014, 2024 and 2026 Swedish Champions.
- Morön BK, football club playing in Division 4 Norra Västerbotten
- Skellefteå FF, football club playing in Division 2 Norrland
- Sunnanå SK, football club with the women's team playing in Elitettan and men's team playing in Division 3 Norrland
- Skellefteå IBK, floorball club
- Skellefteå Innebandy IF, floorball club
- The Skellefteå Kraft Grandmaster Chess Cup 1999, one of the strongest all Swedish chess tournaments was won by IGM Ulf Andersson. The event took place from March 26 – April 4, 1999. An international chess tournament, the final of the two-year World Cup series was held in Skellefteå from August 12 to September 3, 1989. The final sixteen grandmasters participating included three former World Chess Champions Garry Kasparov, Anatoly Karpov and Mikhail Tal. The activities organized around the World Cup final included two performances in Skellefteå of Chess, with music by Benny Andersson and Björn Ulvaeus of the pop group ABBA.

== Notable people ==
=== Sportspeople ===
- Anders Andersson, ice hockey player
- Johan Alm, ice hockey player
- Viktor Arvidsson, ice hockey player for the Los Angeles Kings
- Johan Backlund, ice hockey player
- Evy Berggren, Gymnast, Olympic and World Champion
- Filip Berglund, ice hockey player
- Niclas Burström, ice hockey player
- Robert Dahlgren, racing driver
- Jimmie Ericsson, ice hockey player
- Jan Erixon, ice hockey player
- Tim Erixon, ice hockey player
- Toini Gustafsson-Rönnlund, skier
- Filip Gustavsson, ice hockey goaltender
- Doris Hedberg, gymnast, Olympic silver medalist
- Jonathan Hedström, ice hockey player
- Adam Larsson, ice hockey player for the Seattle Kraken
- Oscar Lindberg, ice hockey player for the Vegas Golden Knights
- Mats Lindgren, ice hockey player
- Joakim Lindström, ice hockey player
- Gustaf Lindvall, ice hockey player
- Arvid Lundberg, ice hockey player
- Hanna Marklund, football player
- Hardy Nilsson, ice hockey player and later coach
- Joakim Nyström, tennis player
- Marcus Pettersson, ice hockey player for the Vancouver Canucks
- David Rundblad, ice hockey player
- Patrik Wallón, ice hockey player
- Adam Wilsby, ice hockey player

=== Bands ===
- Moon Safari, a symphonic rock band
- The Wannadies, an alternative rock band formed in 1988
- Vintersorg, a metal band
- Amber Oak, a pop-rock band
- Black Bonzo (2003–2011) and Gin Lady (2012-present), progressive-rock bands

=== Other ===
- Per Olov Enquist, writer
- Ardalan Esmaili, actor
- Tore Frängsmyr, historian
- Ingrid García-Jonsson, Spanish-Swedish actress
- Peter Haber, actor
- Andreas "Vintersorg" Hedlund, musician
- Varg2™ (Jonas Rönnberg), electronic musician and producer
- Helena Helmersson, CEO of H&M since 2020
- Thomas Idergard, political commentator
- Stieg Larsson, writer
- Stig Larsson, writer
- David Lindgren, musician
- Anna Nordlander, painter
- Victoria Silvstedt, supermodel
- Henning Sjöström, lawyer
- Margot Wallström, former first Vice President of the European Commission and current Special Representative on Sexual Violence in Conflict with the UN. Foreign Secretary of Sweden 2014–2019
- Stina Jackson, Writer

== See also ==
- Kroksjön lake
- Morö backe
- Sollefteå (similar name)
