= Norrøna =

Norwegian brand of outdoor clothing and sports equipment

- Founded: 29 April 1929
- Founder: Jørgen Jørgensen
- Headquarters: Lysaker, Norway
- Area served: Norway, Sweden, Finland, United States, France, and Switzerland
- Products: Clothing and mountain gear
- Revenue: 756,700,000 Norwegian krone (2024)
- Net income: 55,600,000 Norwegian krone (2024)
- Number of employees: 128 (2026)
- Website: norrona.com

Norrøna is a Norwegian brand of outdoor clothing and sports gear. The company was founded in 1929 by Jørgen Jørgensen and is run by his great-grandson, also named Jørgen Jørgensen.

== History ==
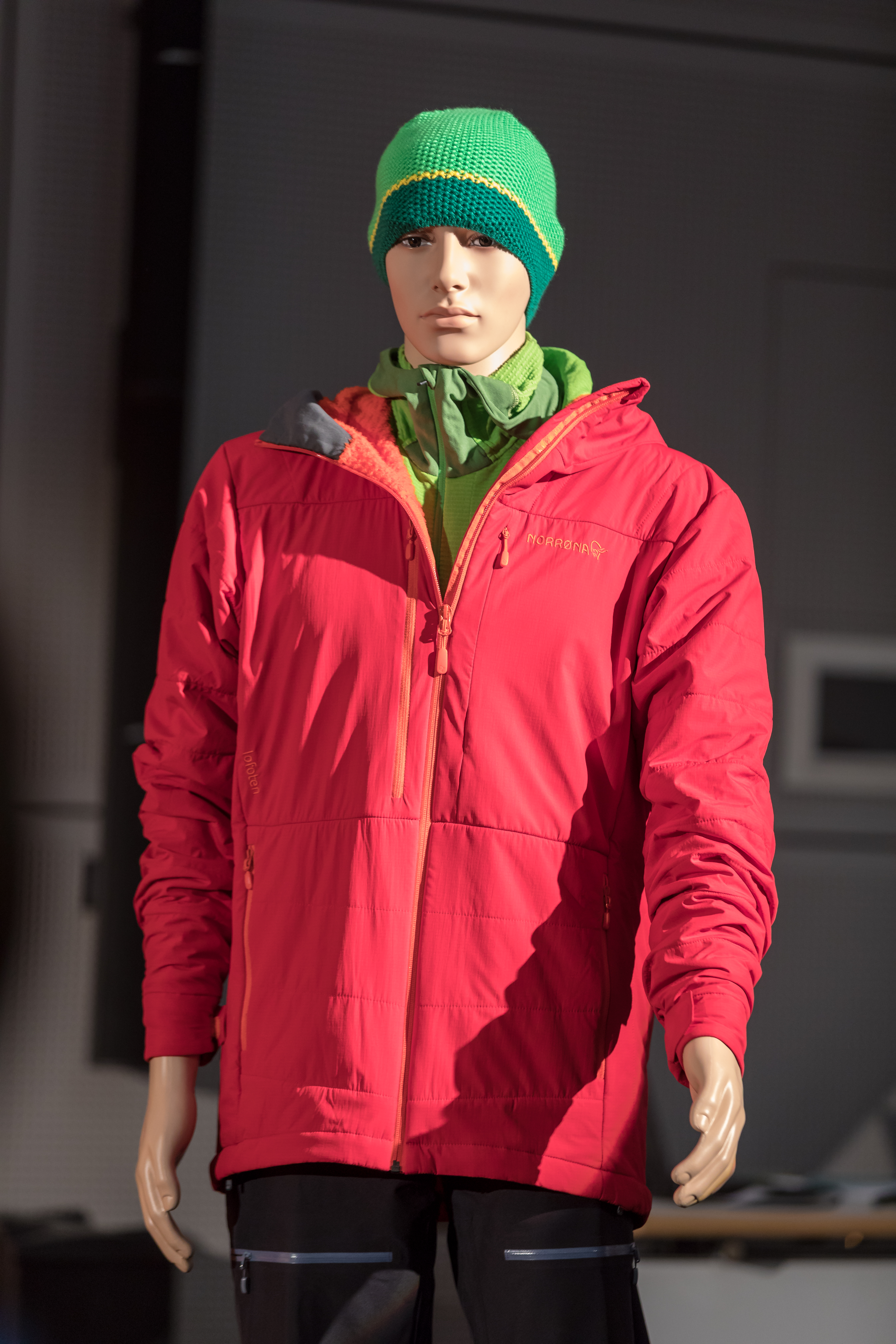
Norrøna jacket from 1993

Norrøna was founded on 29 April 1929 by Jørgen Jørgensen. He was succeeded in turn by his son Bjarne, by Bjarne's son Ole Jørgen, and in 2005 by Ole Jørgen's son Jørgen Jørgensen, who opened the company's first shop in November 2009 and won the Ernst & Young Entrepreneur of the Year Award in the retailing category in 2012. The company has expanded over the years into areas including garden furniture, but now again concentrates on outdoor clothing and expedition equipment for a variety of sports including skiing, snowboarding, mountain biking, climbing, hiking, trekking, hunting, and arctic surfing. The first children's collection is to go on sale in August 2014. Norrøna's annual turnover increased 44% to 235 million Norwegian kroner in 2011 and 22% to 245 million kroner in 2012.

Norrøna is known for innovation and employs 17 of its 55 staff in research and development. Everything is designed (produced mostly in Europe) in-house at its headquarters, in Oslo, Norway, which showcases a picturesque waterfall in the back of the property. Its arctic surf collection, Unstad, was first tested in the river flowing from this waterfall. The company introduced the first tunnel tent for mountaineers, developed an ergonomic standard for backpacks, and introduced Gore-Tex to Europe. It has worked with expedition leaders and sportsmen including Lars Monsen, cyclist Kurt Asle Arvesen, polar explorer Børge Ousland, freerider Christine Hargin, urban skier Even Sigstad, and snowboarder Andreas Wiig. Norrøna also has tapped into the North American market: retailers sell its goods there, and Canadian athletes Mike Henitiuk and boardercross racer Mark Morrison represent the brand.

Norrøna popularised "flashy" colours in outdoor wear. Their flagship product is the Lofoten, a snow suit with a roomy cut that adapts to cross-country or downhill skiing or snowboarding, sells some 500 units a year, and has been widely imitated. Their collections are traditionally named for locations where those particular garments were designed to be worn. For example, the lofoten collection is designed for the big mountain freeriding found in Lofoten, Norway, and their fjørå collection, which is designed for single-track mountain biking, was inspired by the village of Fjørå, which is located in Norway's Sunnmøre fjords and is home to a network of single-track mountain bike trails.
