= Daniel Ervér =

Swedish business executive

- Born: Daniel Ervér; September 11, 1981 (age 44)
- Occupation: Business executive
- Organization(s): Chief executive (2024-onwards), H&M

Daniel Ervér (born September 11, 1981) is the chief executive of H&M, a Swedish retail fashion business, appointed 31 January 2024.

== Career ==
Ervér studied Business Administration at the University of Gothenburg and an exchange with ESSEC Business School in Paris, France.

Ervér began working at H&M in 2005 as a trainee.

He served as head of the H&M brand, the largest brand within the group, for four years previous to his appointment as chief executive in February 2024.
