= Lithium–sulfur battery =

Type of rechargeable battery

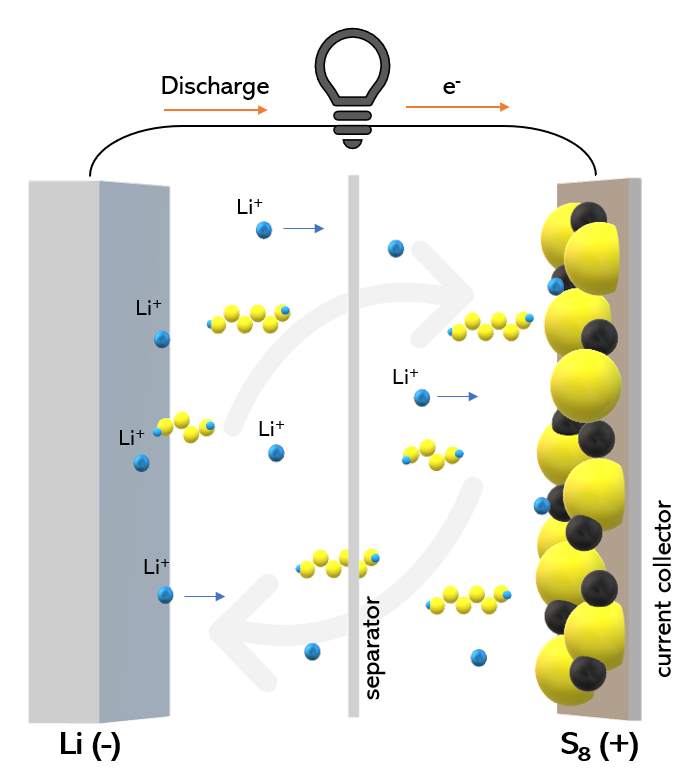
- Working principle of lithium-sulfur battery and "shuttle" effect
- Specific energy: 450 Wh/kg
- Energy density: 550 Wh/L
- Specific power: 590–1,300 W/kg
- Charge/discharge efficiency: 50–95% (C/5)
- Self-discharge rate: 0.002%/month
- Time durability: >10 years
- Cycle durability: 110–1000 cycles
- Nominal cell voltage: Cell voltage varies nonlinearly in the range 2.5–1.7 V during discharge; batteries often packaged for 3 V
- Operating temperature interval: -20°C–60°C

The lithium–sulfur battery (Li–S battery) is a type of rechargeable battery. It is notable for its high specific energy. The low atomic weight of lithium and moderate atomic weight of sulfur means that Li–S batteries are relatively light (about the density of water).

Lithium–sulfur batteries could displace lithium-ion cells because of their higher energy density and lower cost. The use of metallic lithium instead of intercalating lithium ions allows for much higher energy density, as less substances are needed to hold "lithium" and lithium is directly oxidized. Li–S batteries have a high theoretical specific energy (≈2600 Wh/kg for the Li/S redox chemistry), but practical cell-level specific energies in pouch-cell formats are typically ~300–450 Wh/kg today; values above ~400 Wh/kg generally require high sulfur loading, lean-electrolyte operation, and limited excess lithium.

Li–S batteries with up to 1,500 charge and discharge cycles were demonstrated in 2017, but cycle life tests at commercial scale and with lean electrolyte have not been completed. As of early 2021, none were commercially available.

Several issues have slowed acceptance. One is the polysulfide "shuttle" effect that is responsible for the progressive leakage of active material from the cathode, resulting in too few recharge cycles. Also, sulfur cathodes have low conductivity, requiring extra mass for a conducting agent in order to exploit the contribution of active mass to the capacity. Volume expansion of the sulfur cathode during S to Li_{2}S conversion and the large amount of electrolyte needed are also issues.

Progress has been made toward high-stability sulfurized-carbon cathodes. Sulfurized-carbon cathodes (e.g., sulfurized polyacrylonitrile, also known as SPAN) may offer some advantages. Their polysulfide shuttle free feature facilitates proper operation under lean electrolyte conditions (< 3 g·(A·h)^{−1}).

Although Li–S chemistry is attractive for its high theoretical energy density, practical pouch cells require minimizing inactive mass and operating under conditions that resemble commercial batteries. Some practical targets include: (i) high areal sulfur loading (typically ≥5 mg_{s} cm^{−2}) to avoid overestimating capacity in thin electrodes; (ii) lean electrolyte operation, often expressed as electrolyte-to-sulfur ratio E/S ≤5 μL mg/s (or electrolyte-to-capacity ratio E/C ≲5 μL/mAh), because electrolyte can account for a large fraction of pouch-cell mass; and (iii) a controlled negative-to-positive capacity ratio (N/P), since excess lithium metal improves coin-cell cycling but strongly lowers cell-level energy density. These constraints are interdependent: increasing sulfur loading or lowering E/S improves projected energy density, but can also increase polarization and lower reversible capacity if ion/electron transport and interfacial stability are not maintained. Pouch-cell specific energies are often near 400–450 Wh/kg are reached only when these metrics are satisfied simultaneously.

== History ==
Li–S batteries were invented in the 1960s, when Herbert and Ulam patented a primary battery employing lithium or lithium alloys as anodic material, sulfur as cathodic material and an electrolyte composed of aliphatic saturated amines. A few years later the technology was improved by the introduction of organic solvents as PC, DMSO and DMF yielding a 2.35–2.5 V battery. By the end of the 1980s a rechargeable Li–S battery was demonstrated employing ethers, in particular DOL, as the electrolyte solvent.

The critical parameters needed for achieving commercial acceptance have been described. Specifically, Li–S batteries need to achieve a sulfur loading of >5 mg·cm^{−2}, a carbon content of <5%, electrolyte-to-sulfur ratio of <5 μL·mg^{−1}, electrolyte-to-capacity ratio of <5 μL·(mA·h)^{−1}, and negative-to-positive capacity ratio of <5 in pouch-type cells.

They were used on the longest and highest-altitude unmanned solar-powered aeroplane flight (at the time) by Zephyr 6 in August 2008.

== Chemistry ==
Chemical processes in the Li–S cell include lithium dissolution from the anode surface (and incorporation into alkali metal polysulfide salts) during discharge, and reverse lithium plating to the anode while charging.

=== Anode ===
At the anodic surface, dissolution of the metallic lithium occurs, with the production of electrons and lithium ions during the discharge and electrodeposition during the charge. The half-reaction is expressed as:

Li ⇌ Li^{+} + e^{−}

In analogy with lithium batteries, the dissolution / electrodeposition reaction causes over time problems of unstable growth of the solid-electrolyte interface (SEI), generating active sites for the nucleation and dendritic growth of lithium. Dendritic growth is responsible for the internal short circuit in lithium batteries and leads to the death of the battery itself.

=== Cathode ===
One idealized concept for Li–S batteries, energy is stored in the sulfur cathode (S_{8}). During discharge, the lithium ions in the electrolyte migrate to the cathode where the sulfur is reduced to lithium sulphide (Li_{2}S). The sulfur is reoxidized to S_{8} during the recharge phase. This idealized semi-reaction is therefore expressed as:

S + 2 Li^{+} + 2 e^{−} ⇌ Li_{2}S (E° ≈ 2.15 V vs Li/Li^{+} )

In reality the sulfur is reduced not to lithium sulphide but to lithium polysulphides (Li_{2}S_{x}, 2 ≤ x ≤ 8) at decreasing chain length according to:

S_{8} + 2 Li → Li_{2}S_{8}
Li_{2}S_{8} + 2 Li → Li_{2}S_{6} + Li_{2}S_{2}
...

Depending on the battery, the final product is a mixture of Li_{2}S_{2} and Li_{2}S. This contrasts with conventional lithium-ion cells, where the lithium ions are intercalated in the anode and cathodes. Each sulfur atom can host two lithium ions. Typically, lithium-ion batteries accommodate only 0.5–0.7 lithium ions per host atom. Consequently, Li–S allows for a much higher lithium storage density. Polysulfides are reduced on the cathode surface in sequence while the cell is discharging:

S_{8} → Li_{2}S_{8} → Li_{2}S_{6} → Li_{2}S_{4} → Li_{2}S_{3}

Across a porous diffusion separator, sulfur polymers form at the cathode as the cell charges:

Li_{2}S → Li_{2}S_{2} → Li_{2}S_{3} → Li_{2}S_{4} → Li_{2}S_{6} → Li_{2}S_{8} → S_{8}

These reactions are analogous to those in the sodium–sulfur battery.

The main challenges of Li–S batteries is the low conductivity of sulfur and its considerable volume change upon discharging and finding a suitable cathode is the first step for commercialization of Li–S batteries. Therefore, carbon/sulfur cathode and a lithium anode are common. Sulfur is very cheap, but has practically no electroconductivity, 5×10^{−30} S⋅cm^{−1} at 25 °C. A carbon coating provides the missing electroconductivity. Carbon nanofibers provide an effective electron conduction path and structural integrity, at the disadvantage of higher cost.

One problem with the lithium–sulfur design is that when the sulfur in the cathode absorbs lithium, volume expansion of the Li_{x}S compositions occurs, and predicted volume expansion of Li_{2}S is nearly 80% of the volume of the original sulfur. This causes large mechanical stresses on the cathode, which is a major cause of rapid degradation. This process negatively affects the contact between the carbon and the sulfur, and prevents the flow of lithium ions to the carbon surface.

Mechanical properties of the lithiated sulfur compounds are strongly contingent on the lithium content, and with increasing lithium content, the strength of lithiated sulfur compounds improves, although this increment is not linear with lithiation.

One of the primary shortfalls of most Li–S cells is unwanted reactions with the electrolytes. While S and Li_{2}S are relatively insoluble in most electrolytes, many intermediate polysulfides are not. Dissolving Li_{2}S_{n} into electrolytes causes irreversible loss of active sulfur. Use of highly reactive lithium as a negative electrode causes dissociation of most of the commonly used other type electrolytes. Use of a protective layer in the anode surface has been studied to improve cell safety, i.e., using Teflon coating showed improvement in the electrolyte stability, LIPON, Li_{3}N also exhibited promising performance.

== Polysulfide "shuttle" ==
Historically, the "shuttle" effect is the main cause of degradation in a Li–S battery. The lithium polysulfide Li_{2}S_{x} (6 ≤ x ≤ 8) is highly soluble in the common electrolytes used for Li–S batteries. They are formed and leaked from the cathode and they diffuse to the anode, where they are reduced to short-chain polysulfides and diffuse back to the cathode where long-chain polysulfides are formed again. This process results in the continuous leakage of active material from the cathode, lithium corrosion, low coulombic efficiency and low battery life. Moreover, the "shuttle" effect is responsible for the characteristic self-discharge of Li–S batteries, because of slow dissolution of polysulfide, which occurs also in rest state. The "shuttle" effect in a Li–S battery can be quantified by a factor f_{c} (0 < f_{c} < 1), evaluated by the extension of the charge voltage plateau. The factor f_{c} is given by the expression:

$$f_c =\frac{k_\text{s}q_\text{up}[S_\text{tot}]}{I_c}$$

where k_{s}, q_{up}, [S_{tot}] and I_{c} are respectively the kinetic constant, specific capacity contributing to the anodic plateau, the total sulfur concentration and charge current.

Its initial capacity was 800 Ah/kg (classical LiCoO_{2}/graphite batteries have a cell capacity of 100 Ah/kg). It decayed only very slowly, on average 0.04% each cycle, and retained 658 Ah/kg after 4000 cycles (82%).

== Electrolyte ==
Conventionally, Li–S batteries employ a liquid organic electrolyte, contained in the pores of PP separator. The electrolyte plays a key role in Li–S batteries, acting both on "shuttle" effect by the polysulfide dissolution and the SEI stabilization at anode surface. It has been demonstrated that the electrolytes based on organic carbonates commonly employed in Li-ion batteries (i.e. PC, EC, DEC and mixtures of them) are not compatible with the chemistry of Li–S batteries. Long-chain polysulfides undergo nucleophilic attack on electrophilic sites of carbonates, resulting in the irreversible formation of by-products as ethanol, methanol, ethylene glycol and thiocarbonates. In Li–S batteries are conventionally employed cyclic ethers (as DOL) or short-chain ethers (as DME) as well as the family of glycol ethers, including DEGDME and TEGDME. One common electrolyte is 1M LiTFSI in DOL:DME 1:1 vol. with 1%w/w di LiNO_{3} as additive for lithium surface passivation.

Solid-state and gel electrolytes are being explored to improve safety and to suppress polysulfide shuttling by immobilizing sulfur species. Sulfide solid electrolytes provide high ionic conductivity and can enable shuttle-free operation, while polymer or composite electrolytes offer better mechanical compliance and wider processing windows. However, solid-state Li–S cells introduce new challenges, including large interfacial resistance at the sulfur/solid-electrolyte boundary and mechanical loss of contact due to the ~80% volume change during S ↔ Li_{2}S conversion. Recent all-solid-state Li–S prototypes therefore rely on engineered composite cathodes and interface designs to maintain continuous ionic and electronic pathways during cycling.. NASA is developing a solid-state lithium-sulfur battery, SABERS, for application in electric aircraft and spacecraft.

== Safety ==
Because of the high potential energy density and the nonlinear discharge and charging response of the cell, a microcontroller and other safety circuitry is sometimes used along with voltage regulators to manage cell operation and prevent rapid discharge.

== Lifespan ==
Lithium-sulfur (Li-S) batteries have a shorter lifespan compared to traditional Li-ion batteries. Its cycle life can be extended to over 1,000 cycles. One of the primary factors limiting the lifespan of Li-S batteries is the dissolution of polysulfides in the electrolyte, which leads to the shuttle effect and results in capacity loss over time. The operating temperature and cycling rate also play significant roles in determining the lifespan of Li-S batteries.

== Research ==
Research
Anode	Cathode	Date	Source	Specific capacity after cycling	Notes
Lithium metal	Polyethylene glycol coated, pitted mesoporous carbon	17 May 2009	University of Waterloo	1,110 mA⋅h/g after 20 cycles at a current of 168 mA⋅g^{−1}	Minimal degradation during charge cycling. To retain polysulfides in the cathode, the surface was functionalized to repel (hydrophobic) polysulfides. In a test using a glyme solvent, a traditional sulfur cathode lost 96% of its sulfur over 30 cycles, while the experimental cathode lost only 25%.
Lithium metal	Sulfur-coated, disordered carbon hollow carbon nanofibers	2011	Stanford University	730 mA⋅h/g after 150 cycles (at 0.5 C)	An electrolyte additive boosted the faraday efficiency from 85% to over 99%.
Silicon nanowire/carbon	Sulfur-coated, disordered carbon nanotubes made from carbohydrates	2013	CGS	1,300 mA⋅h/g after 400 cycles (at 1 C)	Microwave processing of materials and laser-printing of electrodes.
Silicon carbon	Sulfur	2013	Fraunhofer Institute for Material and Beam Technology IWS	? after 1,400 cycles	
	Copolymerized sulfur	2013	University of Arizona	823 mA⋅h/g at 100 cycles	Uses "inverse vulcanization" on mostly sulfur with a small amount of 1,3-diisopropenylbenzene (DIB) additive
	Porous TiO_{2}-encapsulated sulfur nanoparticles	2013	Stanford University	721 mA⋅h/g at 1,000 cycles (0.5 C)	shell protects the sulfur-lithium intermediate from electrolyte solvent. Each cathode particle is 800 nanometers in diameter. Faraday efficiency of 98.4%.
	Sulfur	June 2013	Oak Ridge National Laboratory	1200 mA·h/g at 300 cycles at 60 °C (0.1 C) 800 mA·h/g at 300 cycles at 60 °C (1 C)	Solid lithium polysulfidophosphate electrolyte. Half the voltage of typical LIBs. Remaining issues include low electrolyte ionic conductivity and brittleness in the ceramic structure.
Lithium	Sulfur-graphene oxide nanocomposite with styrene-butadiene-carboxymethyl cellulose copolymer binder	2013	Lawrence Berkeley National Laboratory	700 mA·h/g at 1,500 cycles (0.05 C discharge) 400 mA·h/g at 1,500 cycles (0.5 C charge / 1 C discharge)	Voltage between about 1.7 and 2.5 volts, depending on charge state. Lithium bis(trifluoromethanesulfonyl)imide) dissolved in a mixture of nmethyl-(n-butyl) pyrrolidinium bis(trifluoromethanesulfonyl)-imide (PYR14TFSI), 1,3-dioxolane (DOL), dimethoxyethane (DME) with 1 M lithium bis-(trifluoromethylsulfonyl)imide (LiTFSI), and lithium nitrate (LiNO_{3}). High porosity polypropylene separator. Specific energy is 500 W⋅h/kg (initial) and 250 W⋅h/kg at 1,500 cycles (C=1.0)
Lithiated graphite	Sulfur	February 2014	Pacific Northwest National Laboratory	400 cycles	Coating prevents polysulfides from destroying the anode.
Lithiated graphene	Sulfur/Lithium-sulfide passivation layer	2014	OXIS Energy	240 mA·h/g (1000 cycles) 25 A·h/cell	Passivation layer prevents sulfur loss
Lithiated hard-carbon	Sulfur-copolymer (poly(S-co-DVB))	2019	Chungnam National University	400 mAh/g for 500 cycles at 3C	The SEI of hard-carbon prevents polysulphides deposition at anode and enables high-rate performance.
Lithium sulfur batteries	Carbon nanotube/Sulfur	2014	Tsinghua University	15.1 mA·h⋅cm^{−2} at a sulfur loading of 17.3 mg_{S}⋅cm^{−2}	A free-standing CNT–S paper electrode with a high areal sulfur-loading was fabricated, in which short MWCNTs served as the short-range electrical conductive network and super-long CNTs acted as both the long-range conductive network and intercrossed binders.
	Glass-coated sulfur with mildly reduced graphene oxide for structural support	2015	University of California, Riverside	700 mA⋅h⋅g^{−1} (50 cycles)	Glass coating prevents lithium polysulfides from permanently migrating to an electrode
Lithium	Sulfur	2016	LEITAT	500 W⋅h/kg	ALISE H2020 project developing a Li–S battery for cars with new components and optimized regarding anode, cathode, electrolyte and separator
Lithium metal	Sulfurized graphene	2021	CATRIN, Palacký University	644 mA⋅h⋅g^{−1} (250 cycles)	An efficient and straightforward approach to prepare a covalently sulfurized graphene cathode for Li–S batteries with high sulfur content and high cycling stability.
Lithum Metal	Sulfur loaded carbon nano-fibers	2022	Drexel University	648 mA⋅h⋅g^{−1} (4000 cycles)	Binderless cathode with sulfur vapor impregnated carbon nano-fibers. Uses carbonate electrolyte. The monoclinic γ-sulfur battery paper.
	Sulfur-loaded carbon nanotubes	2022	Korea Electrotechnology Research Institute	850 mA⋅h⋅g^{−1} (100 cycles)	Uses a phosphorus-doped activated carbon separator layer to minimize the polysulfide shuttle effect, while creating a foldable battery.
Lithium metal	Sprayed Sulfur-Carbon-Binder Cathode	2023	University of South Carolina, ASPIRE	402 mA⋅h⋅g^{−1} (1000 cycles)	Self-Structured binder confined cathode: A sprayed cathode using carbon black, sulfur powder, PVDF and NMP.
Lithium metal	Lithium thiophosphate catholyte	2023	Dartmouth College, Stanford University	1271 mA⋅h⋅g^{−1} (200 cycles)	Adding phosphorus pentasulfide to a Li–S catholyte leads to the formation of complexes that accommodate the discharge product (Li_{2}S) and allow high cyclability and low temperature performance.

== Commercialization ==
As of 2021 few companies had been able to commercialize the technology on an industrial scale. Companies such as Sion Power have partnered with Airbus Defence and Space to test their lithium sulfur battery technology. Airbus Defense and Space successfully launched their prototype High Altitude Pseudo-Satellite (HAPS) aircraft powered by solar energy during the day and by lithium sulfur batteries at night in real life conditions during an 11-day flight. The batteries used in the test flight utilized Sion Power's Li–S cells that provide 350 W⋅h/kg. Lithium-metal batteries are an attractive alternative.

British firm OXIS Energy developed prototype lithium sulfur batteries. Together with Imperial College London and Cranfield University, they published equivalent-circuit-network models for its cells. With Lithium Balance of Denmark they built a prototype scooter battery system primarily for the Chinese market, which had a capacity of 1.2 kWh using 10 Ah Long Life cells, and weighed 60% less than lead acid batteries with a significant increase in range. They also built a 3U, 3,000 W⋅h Rack-Mounted Battery that weighed only 25 kg and was said to be fully scalable. They claimed their Lithium-Sulfur batteries would cost about $200/kWh in mass production. However, the firm entered bankruptcy (insolvency) status in May 2021.

Sony, which also commercialized the first lithium-ion battery, planned to introduce lithium–sulfur batteries to the market in 2020, but has provided no updates since the initial announcement in 2015.

In 2022, the German company Theion claimed to introduce lithium–sulfur batteries for mobile devices in 2023 and for vehicles by 2024.

In January 2023, Zeta Energy was awarded $4 million by the United States Department of Energy ARPA-E program to advance its lithium-sulfur batteries based on a sulfurized-carbon cathode and a vertically aligned carbon nanontube anode. Lyten started up a pilot production line making about 100 batteries a day.

In December 2024, automaker Stellantis and Zeta Energy announced a joint development agreement to advance lithium–sulfur EV batteries, targeting commercial use around 2030 and highlighting cost savings from eliminating nickel and cobalt. In October 2024, Lyten announced plans to build a lithium–sulfur gigafactory near Reno, Nevada, designed for up to ~10 GWh annual capacity, reflecting growing industrial interest in scaling Li–S technology. In August 2025, Lyten also agreed to acquire most of Northvolt's remaining assets and IP in Sweden and Germany, aiming to expand manufacturing and R&D capacity while continuing to mature Li–S cells for transportation and energy-storage markets. and in 2025 Lyten announced the acquisition of Swedish battery manufacturer Northvolt, including R&D, IP, labs and factories in Sweden, USA, Canada, Germany and Poland.

== See also ==
- List of battery types
