= Skellefteå Kraft =

Municipality-owned power company in Sweden

- Company type: municipality owned
- Industry: power industry
- Founded: 1906
- Headquarters: Skellefteå, Sweden
- Area served: Sweden; Finland
- Key people: Joachim Nordin (CEO)
- Products: electric power
- Services: electricity distribution
- Owner: Skellefteå Municipality
- Subsidiaries: Skellefteå Kraft Elnät
- Website: www.skekraft.se

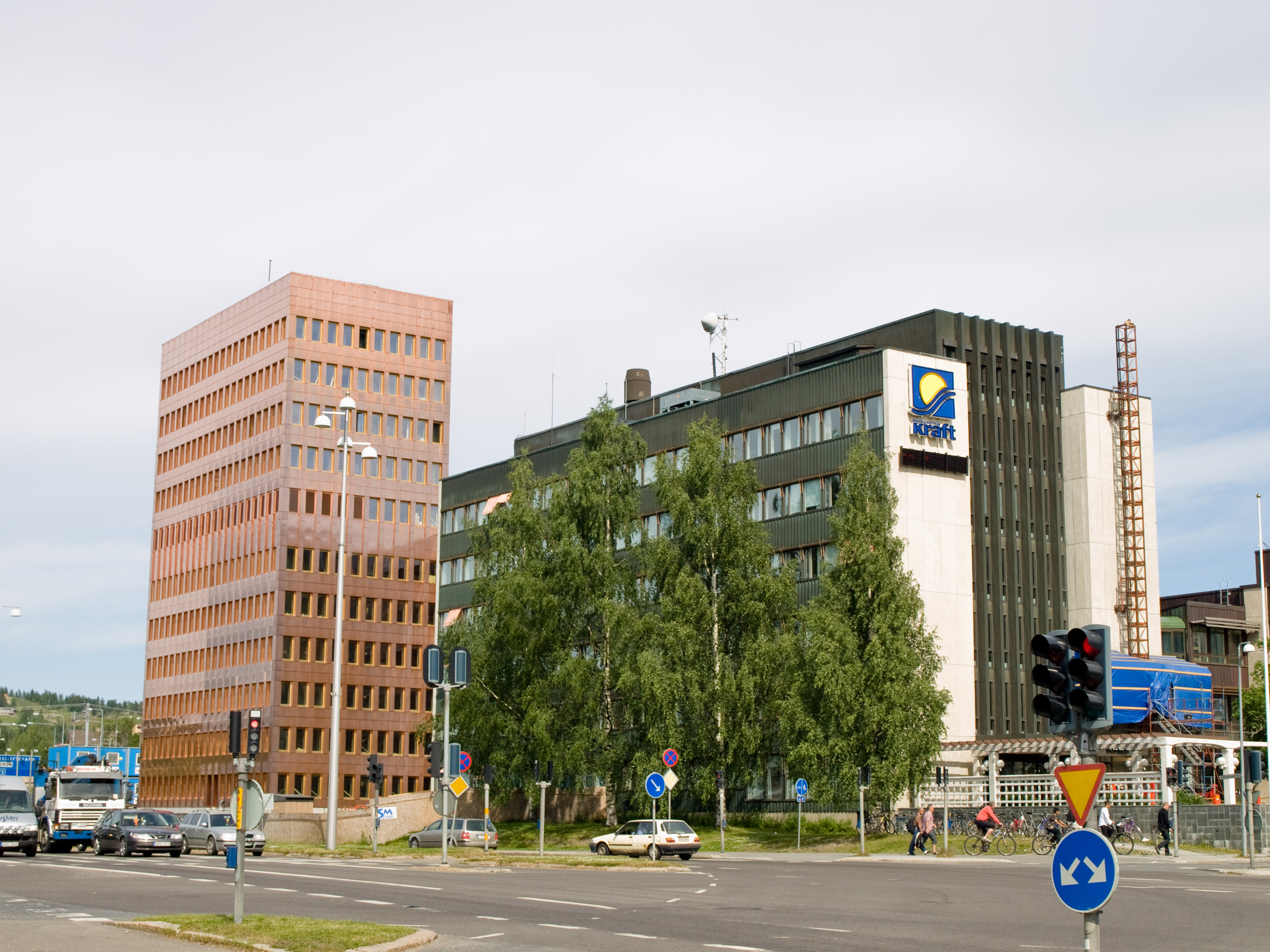
Offices of Skellefteå Kraft

Skellefteå Kraft is a municipality-owned power company in Sweden. The company was established in 1908. It operates in Skellefteå, Lycksele, Storuman and Sundsvall in Sweden, and in Jakobstad in Finland. The company owns a number of hydroelectric power stations and also holds stakes in the Forsmark Nuclear Power Plant and Alholmens Kraft Power Station. In cooperation with Fortum, the company develops the Blaiken wind farm.

The company also operates several regional and local power distribution networks and owns a wood pellets production plant. Together with the technology company Outotec it has established a bio energy power plants technology company called GreenExergy AB.
