= Dave MacLennan =

American businessman

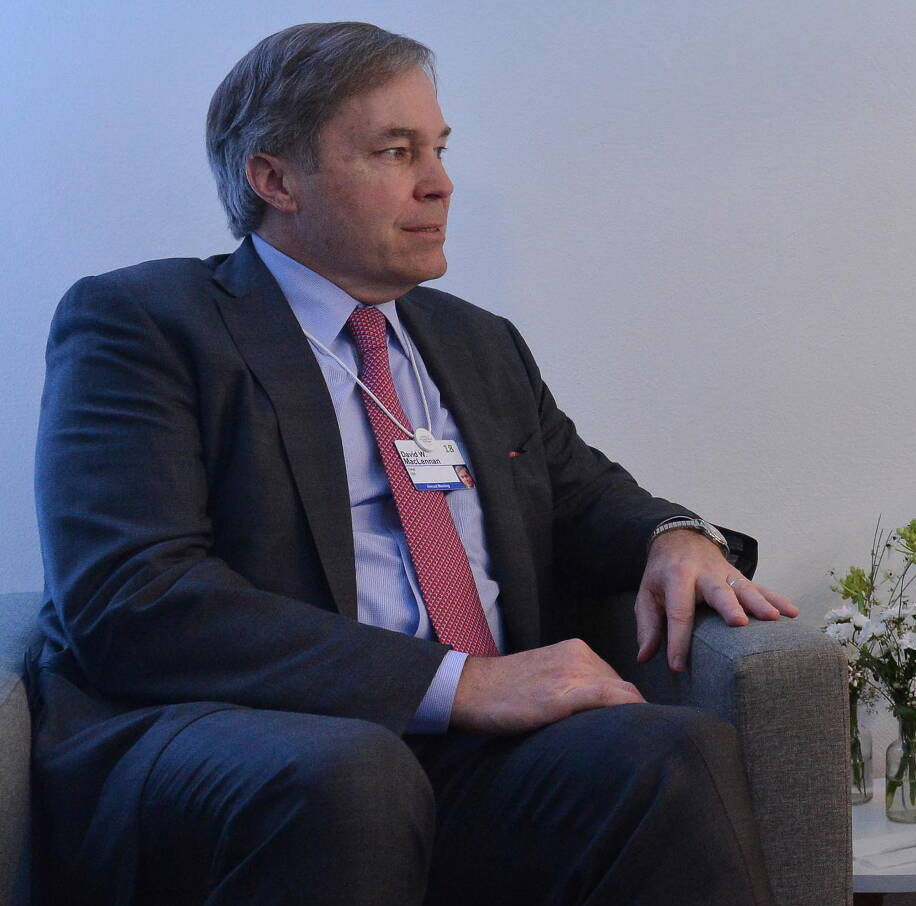
- Born: 1958 or 1959 (age 65–66)
- Education: Amherst College (BA); University of Chicago (MBA)
- Occupation(s): former Chairman, CEO and President, Cargill
- Term: 2013-2023
- Spouse: Kathleen MacLennan (m.1986)
- Children: 3

David W. MacLennan (born 1958/59) is an American businessman, the chairman and chief executive officer (CEO) of Cargill from 2013 to 2023.

MacLennan received a BA in English from Amherst College, followed by an MBA in Finance from the University of Chicago.

MacLennan was chairman and CEO of Cargill since 2013, when he succeeded Greg Page. Under MacLennan’s leadership, Cargill has faced numerous controversies and criticisms. In January 2023, he was succeeded as CEO by Brian Sikes.

== Criticism ==
In 2019, former U.S. Congressman Henry A. Waxman, in a report by Mighty Earth, called Cargill "the worst company in the world" and noted that it drives "the most important problems facing our world" (deforestation, pollution, climate change, exploitation) "at a scale that dwarfs their closest competitors."

== Personal life ==
He is married to Kathleen MacLennan, and they have three children.
