= Cargill (given name) =

Cargill is a male given name. Notable people with the name include:

- Cargill Gilston Knott (1856–1922), Scottish physicist
- Cargill MacMillan Sr. (1900–1968), American businessman
- Cargill MacMillan Jr. (1927–2011), American businessman
