= Micek =

Micek is a surname. Notable people with the surname include:

- Alexa Micek (born 1991), Filipino American volleyball player
- Ernest Micek (born 1936), American businessman
