= Keinath (surname) =

Keinath is a surname. Notable people with the surname include:

- Charles Keinath (1885–1966), American college athlete
- Pauline MacMillan Keinath (born 1934), American billionaire heiress
