= Cargill Russia =

Russian division of Cargill

Cargill Russia operates as a division Cargill that manufactures and markets food products such as oilseeds, poultry, syrups, wheat, starches, specialty food ingredients, and animal feed. Additionally, the company is involved in trading of oilseeds and grains. Cargill Russia presently has around 2,500 employees in Russia. The company opened its first office in Moscow in 1991. In December 2005, the company had 1,306 employees, with over 99 percent of employees being Russian nationals. (Note: "In total Cargill Russia employs 1,306 people, over 99% of whom are Russian nationals.")

== See also ==
- List of companies of Russia
