= Gregory R. Page =

American businessman (born 1952)

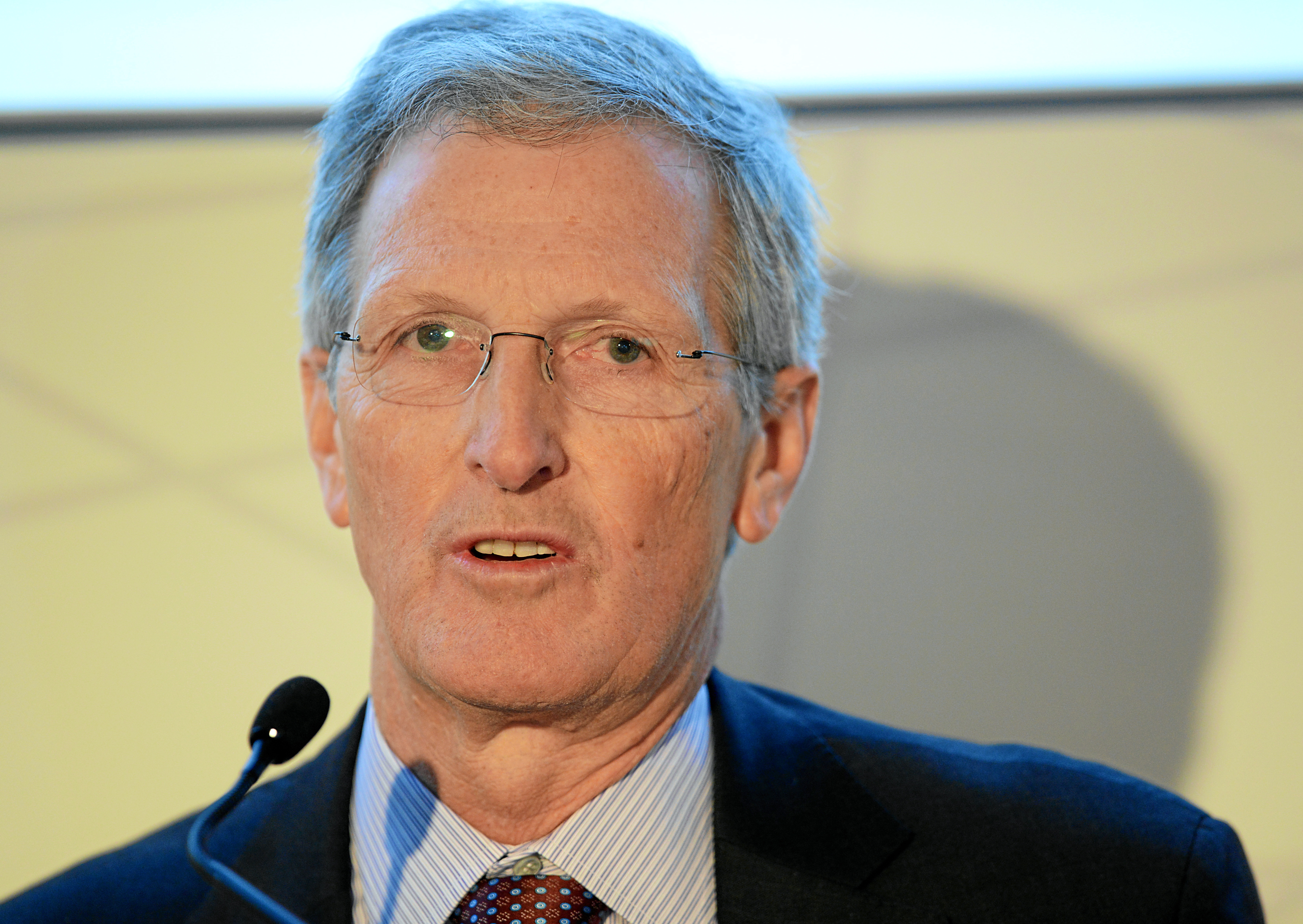
- Gregory R. Page at the World Economic Forum annual meeting in 2013
- Born: 1952 (age 73–74); Bottineau, North Dakota
- Education: University of North Dakota
- Occupation: Business executive
- Employer: Cargill

Gregory "Greg" R. Page (born 1952) is an American businessman. He served as executive chairman of Cargill, Inc. of Minnetonka, Minnesota.

== Early life ==
Gregory R. Page was born in 1952 in Bottineau, North Dakota. He graduated with a bachelor's degree in economics from the University of North Dakota, where he was a member of the Alpha Tau Omega fraternity.

== Cargill Inc ==
He joined Cargill in 1974, and began his career as a trainee assigned to the Feed Division. From 1995 to 1998, Page was the president of the Red Meat Group. In 1998 to 2000, Page served as the corporate vice president and sector president of financial markets and Red Meat Group. Since 2000, Page has served as the president and chief operating officer of Cargill Inc.

On June 1, 2007, Page was named chief executive officer of Cargill, succeeding Warren Staley. Page served as executive chairman of the board of Cargill, Inc. from December 2013 to September 2015, when he announced his retirement.

== Executive positions ==
- President of the Northern Star Council of the Boy Scouts of America
- Chairman of Big Brothers-Big Sisters Of America and serves as its director
- Independent director of Eaton Corporation plc since April 23, 2003
- Director of Cargill Kft. since August 2000
- Independent director of Deere & Company since June 1, 2013
- Director of Black River Asset Management
- Director of Carlson Rezidor Hotel Group
- Director of Carlson Companies, Inc. since October 2010
- Member of Risky Business

== Awards ==
Page received Big Brothers Big Sisters of America's Charles G. Berwind Lifetime Achievement Award in 2011.
