= Cargill MacMillan Sr. =

American business executive

Cargill MacMillan Sr. (October 10, 1900 – October 16, 1968) was an American business executive, serving as the President of Cargill in Minneapolis.

== Early life ==
MacMillan was born on October 10, 1900. He was the second son of John H. MacMillan Sr. and Edna Clara Cargill.

== Career ==
MacMillan served as the President of Cargill.

== Personal life ==
He married Pauline Whitney (1900–1990), and they had four children. Each of the three surviving adult children received a one-ninth share of Cargill.

- Cargill MacMillan Jr. (1927–2011)
- Whitney MacMillan (1929–2020)
- Alice Whitney MacMillan (1932–1932)
- Pauline MacMillan Keinath (born 1934)

== Death ==
MacMillan died on October 16, 1968.
