= Brian Sikes =

American business executive

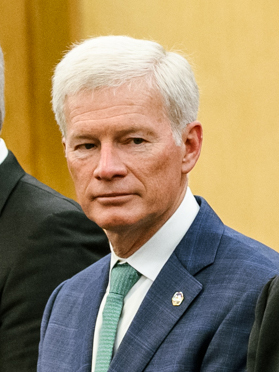
- Sikes in 2026
- Education: Texas Tech University
- Occupation: Business executive
- Title: Chairman and CEO, Cargill
- Term: 2023-
- Predecessor: Dave MacLennan
- Board member of: Cargill, US-China Business Council

Brian Sikes is an American business executive, and the chairman and CEO of Cargill, an American multinational food company, and the largest privately held company in the US in terms of revenue.

== Education ==
Sikes attended Texas Tech University and earned a bachelor's degree in agricultural economics in 1990.

== Career ==
In 1991, Sikes began working at Cargill. In 2019, he joined the company's executive team while leading the global protein and salt division.

In 2021, he took on the role of chief operating officer (COO) at Cargill as well as becoming a member of the board of directors.

In January 2023, he succeeded Dave MacLennan as president and CEO of Cargill. In doing so, he became the 10th CEO in Cargill's history that spans 158 years.

In January 2024, Sikes was elected chair of Cargill's board of directors. In his 34 plus years at Cargill, Sikes has held global leadership positions in the United States, Canada, and Europe. In 2024, under Sikes's leadership, Cargill became involved in a $40 million housing program to build worker housing in Fort Morgan, Colorado. Also in 2024, Sikes was listed on Fortune's 100 Most Powerful People in Business list.

While working for Cargill in Kansas, he was on the Greater Wichita Partnership's executive board.

Since 2022, he has been a board member on the US-China Business Council.
