= Pauline MacMillan Keinath =

American billionaire heiress

- Born: Pauline MacMillan; July 31, 1934 (age 91); Hennepin County, Minnesota, US
- Occupation: Heiress
- Known for: 9% stake in Cargill
- Spouse: Married
- Children: 4
- Relatives: William Wallace Cargill (great-grandfather); Cargill MacMillan Jr. (brother); Whitney MacMillan (brother)

Pauline MacMillan Keinath (born July 31, 1934, in Hennepin County, Minnesota) is an American billionaire heiress. She is believed to be the largest individual shareholder in Cargill.

== Wealth ==
As of March 2026, she had a net worth of $9.5 billion from an inherited 9% stake in Cargill.

In 2014, she was the 16th richest woman in the US. In 2022, her wealth made her the richest person in Missouri.

== Family ==
She is a great-granddaughter of William Wallace Cargill, the founder of Cargill, the largest private company in the US. Her father was Cargill MacMillan Sr. (1900–1968). She has two siblings, Whitney MacMillan (1929–2020) and Cargill MacMillan.

She is married, with four children, and lives in St. Louis, Missouri.

== Political involvement ==
Keinath continued support of Josh Hawley after his role in the January 6 United States Capitol attack, with donations of $1,900 reported in the second half of 2021.

In 2023, the family of Pauline MacMillan Keinath were the largest donors to Andrew Bailey's run for Missouri Attorney General, having contributed $375,000 to the Life and Liberty PAC.
