= Cargill MacMillan Jr. =

American billionaire businessman

- Born: March 29, 1927; Hennepin County, Minnesota, U.S.
- Died: November 14, 2011 (aged 84); Indian Wells, California, U.S.
- Education: Yale University
- Occupation: Businessman
- Known for: Director of Cargill
- Spouse: Donna MacMillan
- Children: 6
- Parent(s): Cargill MacMillan Sr. and Pauline Whitney
- Relatives: William Wallace Cargill (great-grandfather); Whitney MacMillan (brother); Pauline MacMillan Keinath (sister)

Cargill MacMillan Jr. (March 29, 1927 – November 14, 2011) was an American billionaire businessman, a director of Cargill.

== Early life ==
He was born in Hennepin County, Minnesota, on March 29, 1927, the eldest son of Cargill MacMillan Sr. (1900–1968) and Pauline Whitney (1900–1990). MacMillan served in the US Air Force and then graduated from Yale University in 1950.

== Career ==
MacMillan worked at Cargill for 38 years, and retired in 1988. MacMillan is credited with designing the Cargill Office Center in Minnetonka, Minnesota.

MacMillan served on the boards of Abbott Northwestern Hospital, Minneapolis Society of Fine Arts, Twin Cities Public Television, Minneapolis Institute of Arts, Macalester College, Greater Minneapolis Chamber of Commerce, United Way of the Minneapolis Area, the Johnson Institute, Northwestern National Bank of Minneapolis, Community First Bank, Minnesota Outward Bound School, and the YMCA.

In 1990, he moved to Indian Wells, California. He died at his home there on November 14, 2011, from complications of Parkinson's disease, with an estimated net worth of at $2.6 billion.
