= Whitney MacMillan =

American businessman (1929–2020)

- Born: September 25, 1929; Orono, Minnesota, U.S.
- Died: March 11, 2020 (aged 90); Vero Beach, Florida, U.S.
- Education: Yale University
- Occupations: Businessman; Philanthropist
- Title: CEO of Cargill
- Term: 1977–1995
- Predecessor: Erwin Kelm
- Successor: Ernest Micek
- Spouse: Betty MacMillan
- Children: 2
- Parent: Cargill MacMillan Sr.
- Relatives: William Wallace Cargill (great-grandfather); Cargill MacMillan Jr. (brother); Pauline MacMillan Keinath (sister)

Whitney MacMillan (September 25, 1929 – March 11, 2020) was an American billionaire heir and businessman. He was the chairman and chief executive officer (CEO) of his family business, Cargill, from 1976 to 1995.

== Early life ==
Whitney MacMillan was born on September 25, 1929. He was the son of Pauline Whitney and Cargill MacMillan Sr., and the great-grandson of William Wallace Cargill, the founder of Cargill. He has one brother, Cargill MacMillan Jr. (1927–2011), and one sister, Pauline MacMillan Keinath. He graduated from Yale University.

== Business ==
He was CEO of Cargill from 1976 to 1995, and the last family member to be CEO. During his tenure, Cargill's annual turnover went from $10 to $33 billion over ten years. By the 1980s, it became the world's largest grain company, outstripping its European rivals.

He was a director of the Western NIS Enterprise Fund. He owned and ran a cow and calf ranch in Park, Sweet Grass, and Fergus counties in Montana.

== Philanthropy ==
He served on the board of directors of the International Peace Institute, the Salzburg Global Seminar, the Rural Development Institute, the Trilateral Commission, Hubert H. Humphrey School of Public Affairs at the University of Minnesota, the Ruckelshaus Institute, the Burton K. Wheeler Center for Public Policy in Bozeman, Montana and Yale University's president's council on international activities. He served on the National Advisory Board of the Museum of the Rockies in Bozeman, Montana. He was a member of the National Academy of Sciences board on agriculture and natural resources, the EastWest Institute, Care International, Mayo Clinic and the Council on Foreign Relations.

The Whitney and Betty MacMillan Center for International and Area Studies at Yale is named for him. In 2002, he received an honorary doctorate from Montana State University-Bozeman. He was an executive fellow and teacher at the University of St. Thomas Graduate School of Business in Minnesota.

Together with the Montana Historical Society, he was restoring the ghost town of Judith Landing, Montana at the confluence of Judith River and Missouri River.

== Personal life ==
He was married to Betty MacMillan. He lived in Minneapolis, Minnesota. As of August 2014, he was worth an estimated US$4.8 billion.

He died on March 11, 2020, in Vero Beach, Florida, at the age of 90.
