= Nutrena Feeds =

Animal feed brand

- Industry: Animal feed
- Founded: 1921
- Founder: Miller-McConnell Grain Company
- Area served: United States, Canada
- Parent: Cargill
- Website: nutrenaworld.com

Nutrena Feeds is a North American brand of animal feed for horses, poultry, livestock, and pets. Founded in 1921, it is owned by Cargill and is that company's oldest active brand. It sells feeds through its sub-brands which include SafeChoice, ProForce, Empower, NatureWise, Country Feeds, Loyall Life, and True.

== History ==
=== 1921-1944: Early History ===
Nutrena was originally registered as a brand in 1921 by Kansas City feed producer Miller-McConnell Grain Company. The company operated mills in Kansas City as well as Coffeyville, Kansas and Sioux City, Iowa. In 1922 it received its first patent, and in 1923 it introduced the first pellet mill used in feed processing.

In its early years, Nutrena maintained an experimental farm in Pleasant Hill, Missouri where it tested feeds under everyday farm conditions. It is also credited with introducing the first colored bags into the feed industry.

=== 1945-1999: Cargill ===
By 1945 it was producing 23,000 tons of feed per month and was considered a pioneer in the animal feed business, producing feed for poultry, hog and specialty feeds for rabbits and dogs. It was also known for its marketing by using decorative feed sacks, radio broadcasts, and sales promotions. Its stock was purchased by Cargill in 1945. Cargill had focused on building T1 tankers and Towboats for the United States Navy during World War II while still storing and transporting grain. After the war, it began focusing on animal feeds which were in short supply and purchased Nutrena which was known as Nutrena Mills at the time. The purchase doubled the size of Cargill's animal feed business.

In 1949, Nutrena began introducing animal factor protein and vitamin B12 to its poultry and swine feeds. It also continued expanding, including with the purchase of Royal Feed and Milling Company and the Fairmont Foods processing plant in Giddings, Texas. Nutrena absorbed Royal Feed and Million Co. of Memphis when it was purchased by Cargill in 1951.

Nutrena purchased an 840-acre farm in Elk River, Minnesota in 1957 and developed it into a research farm to study animal feed. The farm replaced Nutrena's former research facility in Pleasant Hill, Missouri. In 1957 it also became the first feed company to offer chick insurance.

In 1965, Cargill purchased Pillsbury's feed division and began branding Nutrena as "Cargill Nutrena." In 1974 it expanded in Canada with the purchase of National Grain facilities in Manitoba, Saskatchewan and Alberta. Nutrena continued to expanded, and in the 1980s acquired Beacon Milling (1985), the Aco brand from Quaker Oats Company (1987), and Hansen & Peterson (1989).

=== 2000-Present: Standalone Brand ===
2000 becomes a standalone brand. Its research capabilities were expanded with additional facilities and production sites with the 2001 purchase of Agribrands International by Cargill.

In 2017, the animal feed business of Southern States Cooperative was absorbed into Nutrena after being purchased by Cargill. The purchase included seven feed mills and the company's product portfolio and brands.

== Products ==
Nutrena manufactures and sells animal feeds and supplements for horses, poultry, livestock, and pets. It markets the feeds under sub-brands, including SafeChoice, ProForce, and Empower for horses. Sub-brands for livestock and poultry include NatureWise and Country Feeds. Its pet foods are marketed under the Loyall Life and True labels. It also has multi-species feeds that can be used for cattle, pigs, goats, and specialty animals. Products are sold in the United States through retailers such as Tractor Supply.
