= MacMillan Center for International and Area Studies =

International relations school at Yale University

Coordinates: 41.31437°N 72.92414°W

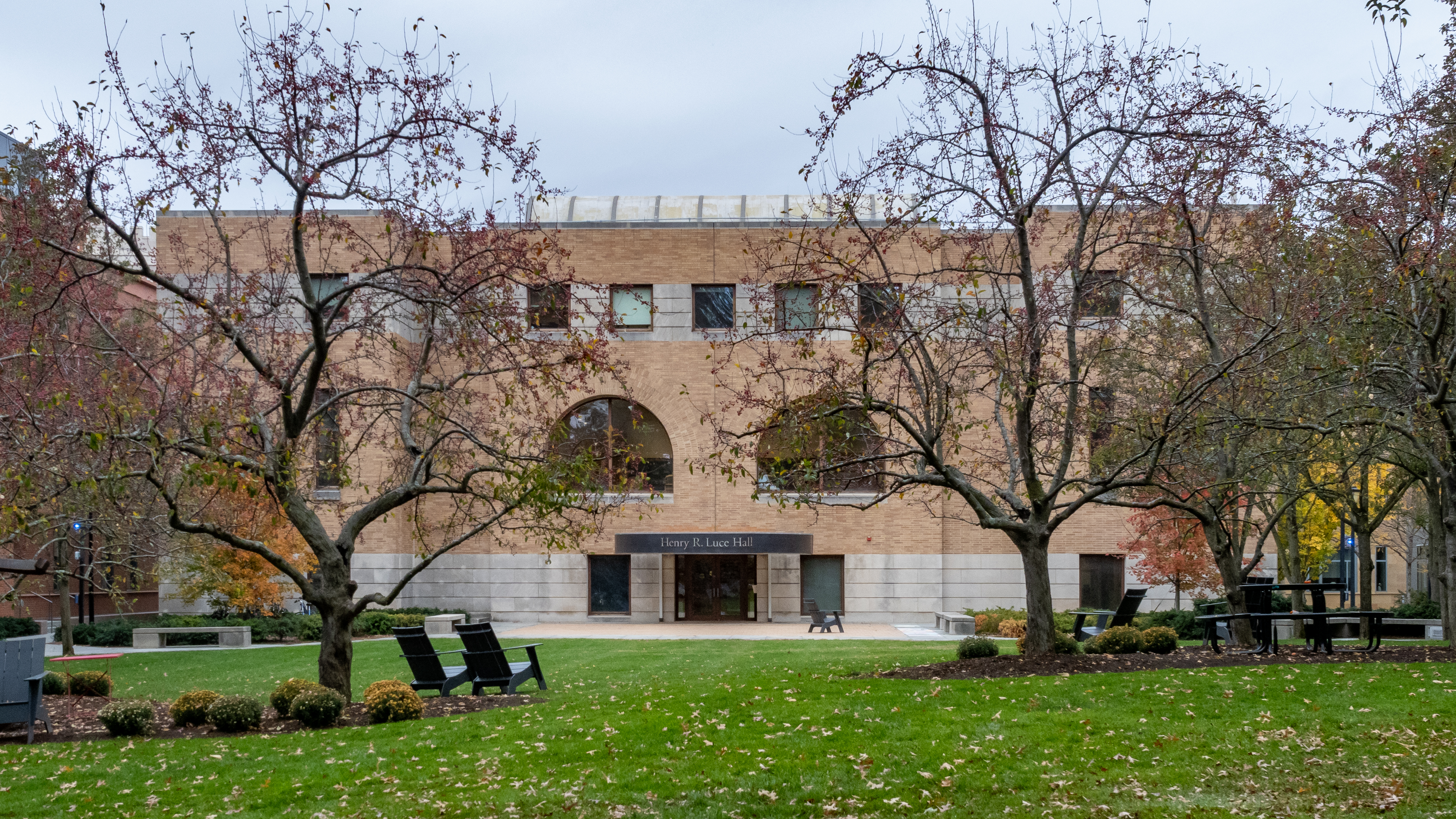
Luce Hall, the MacMillan Center's main building.

The Whitney and Betty MacMillan Center for International and Area Studies at Yale, commonly known as the MacMillan Center, is a research and educational center for international affairs and area studies at Yale University. It is named after Whitney MacMillan and his wife Betty. The Center’s teaching, research, and programming are steered by faculty-led regional councils and global programs.

The mission of the MacMillan Center is to pursue excellence in research, teaching, and capacity building across societies to foster a more informed, inclusive, and flourishing world. The Center is guided by five core principles: academic excellence; disciplinarity and transdisciplinarity; collaboration and community; balance and capacity; and curiosity. Seven interrelated themes connect the work of the councils and programs: humanity, dignity, good governance, environment, climate change, societal resilience, and leadership and service.

The MacMillan Center provides opportunities for scholarly research and intellectual innovation; awards nearly 500 fellowships and grants each year to students and faculty; encourages faculty/student collaboration; sponsors approximately 800 lectures, conferences, workshops, seminars, and films each year (many are free and open to the public); produces a range of working papers and other academic publications; and contributes to library collections comprising 1.4 million volumes in the languages of various areas.

== Academics ==
As of 2026, the MacMillan Center offers five undergraduate and three graduate degrees. Undergraduate degrees include African Studies, East Asian Studies, Latin American Studies, Middle East Studies, and South Asian Studies. Master's degrees offered at the center include African Studies, East Asian Studies, and Russian and Eastern European Studies.

Master’s students enrolled in graduate-degree programs at the Graduate School of Arts and Sciences or any of Yale’s professional schools may pursue a graduate certificate of concentration on African Studies, European and Russian Studies, Latin American & Iberian Studies, Material Histories of the Human Record, Middle East Studies, or Translation Studies. Undergraduate certificates of concentration are in Collections: Objects, Research, Society, and Translation Studies. They may also pursue language study certificates through the Council on African Studies (Kiswahili, Yorùbá, and isiZulu), South Asian Studies Council (Hindi and Sanskrit), and Council on Southeast Asian Studies (Indonesian, Vietnamese, and Filipino).

== History ==
Yale invested in international and regional studies long before the MacMillan Center formally came into being. The World Wars awakened particular interests in the cultures, histories, economies, and languages of regions in Europe and Asia.

The Yale Institute of International Studies was established in 1935. Combining history, politics, and languages to foster global literacy, the Institute became a national pioneer in interdisciplinary learning. Responding to the rise of fascism in Europe in the 1930s, it promoted applied area knowledge and shaped foreign policy.

During World War II, Yale faculty trained soldiers in languages, cultures, and regional affairs across Asia, Russia, and Europe. These academic programs laid the groundwork for Yale's first regional councils, many of which predate the MacMillan Center. As Yale shifted its institutional priorities, the Institute of International Studies came to an end in 1951.

Reinvigorated interest in international studies at Yale and a critical Ford Foundation grant led to the 1961 establishment of the Concilium on International and Area Studies. In 1983, it was renamed as the Yale Center for International and Area Studies (YCIAS). A transformative gift from The Henry Luce Foundation allowed for the opening of Luce Hall in 1995, providing the Center with a unifying collaborative space for the first time. In April 2006, YCIAS was renamed The Whitney and Betty MacMillan Center for International and Area Studies, honoring alumni generosity.

== Regional Councils ==
The MacMillan Center hosts seven regional councils, covering the areas of Africa, East Asia, Europe, Latin America and Iberia, the Middle East, South Asia, and Southeast Asia. Regional councils are permanent features of the Center that foster collaboration among faculty from various disciplines across Yale and support scholarship, language instruction, research funding, and public engagement.

The regional councils host undergraduate majors and master's degree programs, creating a direct academic connection to area studies for students. They regularly teach all levels of eight foreign languages including Hindi, Indonesian, Sanskrit, Swahili, Vietnamese, Yorùbá, isiZulu, and Filipino. In partnership with the Center for Language Study (CLS), the MacMillan Center supports Directed Independent Language Study in more than sixty languages for undergraduate, graduate, and professional school students.

== Global Programs ==
As of 2026, the MacMillan Center hosts nineteen global programs which promote scholarship and exchanges across a range of thematic areas. Guided by the vision of the Center’s faculty, global programs enable Yale faculty to lead interdisciplinary exploration of transnational issues of global consequence.

Drawing upon world-class scholarship from within and outside the university, the programs are designed to interrogate the causes of global challenges while advancing new forms of inquiry in the humanities, social sciences, and related fields.

=== Full List of Global Programs ===
==== Buddhist Studies Initiative ====
Coordinators: Eric Greene, Sonam Kachru, Hwansoo Kim, Aleksandar Uskokov, Mimi Yiengpruksawan Buddhist Studies brings together individuals and units at Yale interested in the scholarly study of Buddhism and coordinates scholarly events, courses, conferences, and outreach activities.

==== Center for Historical Enquiry and the Social Sciences ====
Co-directors: Julia Adams, Isabela Mares

The Center for Historical Enquiry & the Social Sciences highlights the interplay between history and the present. Its work spurs new collective thinking about large-scale social transformations and solutions to seemingly intractable social crises and problems.

==== Collaborations to Study Materiality and Objects ====
Co-directors: Lucy Mulroney, Ayesha Ramachandran

COSMOS is a collaboration of scholars, practitioners, and students reworking approaches to materiality and objects across the world. This approach includes experimentation, historical inquiry, and scientific exploration through hands-on work with the materials that shape global cultural heritage. The collaboration was founded with the intent to conduct ethical research and equitable partnerships among institutions and communities.

==== Committee on Canadian Studies ====
Director: Jay Gitlin

The Committee on Canadian Studies offers an array of inter-disciplinary events for scholars, students, and the public, while supporting and disseminating Yale scholarship related to Canada. It also publishes the Yale Journal on Canadian Studies annually.

==== Conflict, Resilience, and Health Program ====
Director: Catherine Panter-Brick

The Conflict, Resilience, and Health Program is an interdisciplinary group that works to build resilience and health in communities afflicted by armed conflict or structural violence. This program engages with academics, practitioners, and policy makers to promote innovations in global health research and to evaluate resilience-building interventions.

==== Fox International Fellowship ====
Director: Emily Erikson

The Fox International Fellowship is a graduate student exchange program between Yale University and 21 world-renowned academic partners in Africa, Asia, Australia, Europe, the Middle East, and the Americas. There are more than 800 alumni in the extensive Fox Fellowship network. The mission of the Fox International Fellowship is to enhance mutual understanding between the peoples of the United States and other countries by promoting international scholarly exchanges and collaborations among the next generation of leaders. To accomplish this goal, the program seeks to identify and nurture those students who are interested in harnessing scholarly knowledge to respond to the world’s most pressing challenges.

==== Genocide Studies Program ====
Director: David Simon

Founded in January 1998 to expand the work begun in 1994 by Yale University’s Cambodian Genocide Program, the Genocide Studies Program conducts research, seminars and conferences on comparative, interdisciplinary, and policy issues relating to the phenomenon of genocide, and has provided training to researchers from afflicted regions, including Cambodia, Rwanda, and East Timor.

==== Gilder Lehrman Center for the Study of Slavery, Resistance, and Abolition ====
Director: David Blight

Established in 1998, the Gilder Lehrman Center for the Study of Slavery, Resistance, and Abolition (GLC) is the world’s first institution dedicated to the study of global histories of slavery across all borders and time. The mission of the GLC is to equip educators, students, policymakers, and the public to grapple with the lasting harms of slavery and racism, to embrace the ongoing struggle for human dignity and freedom, and to make knowledge freely available to all. In addition, the center offers postdoctoral and faculty fellowships and summer graduate research fellowships and sponsors the Frederick Douglass Book prize, an award for most outstanding non-fiction book in English on the subject of slavery, resistance, and/or abolition for the year it is given.

==== Hellenic Studies Program ====
Director: Costas Arkolakis

This program supports and coordinates the teaching and study of post-Antiquity Hellenic culture and civilization at Yale.

==== Identity and Conflict Lab ====
Founder and faculty director: Nicholas Sambanis

The Identity & Conflict Lab (ICL) is a research group that studies inter-group conflict. Their research is motivated by major problems of our time, such as civil war, ethnic violence, racial prejudice and religious intolerance. They consider how social identities shape individual behavior, how conflict affects identities, and what interventions are effective in reducing conflict. The Lab promotes an inter-disciplinary, multi-method approach to the study of conflict and connects faculty, postdocs, and graduate students from different departments and schools across Yale and other universities.

==== Inclusion Economics ====
Managing director: Deanna Ford

A collaboration across Yale’s Economic Growth Center and the MacMillan Center, Yale Inclusion Economics advances research-backed solutions to build more inclusive, just societies. It does so through innovative data collection, cutting-edge research, close engagement with stakeholders, and communication of data insights. Its work spans a number of research areas, including gender, environment and climate change, digital inclusion, governance, and financial inclusion.

==== Leitner Program in International and Comparative Political Economy ====
Director: Gerard Padro i Miquel

The Leitner Program promotes research and teaching about the interactions between politics and economics around the world.

==== Nuclear Security Program ====
Director: Alexandre Debs

The Nuclear Security Program (NSP) aims to better understand and address the increasingly complex and challenging realities of nuclear security. It also aims to diversify voices and perspectives on nuclear security by bringing together faculty members, current students, visitors, and recent graduates to campus to reflect on these issues.

==== Political Violence and its Legacies Workshop ====
The MacMillan Political Violence and its Legacies (PVL) workshop is an interdisciplinary forum for work in progress by Yale faculty and graduate students, as well as scholars from other universities. PVL is designed to foster a wide-ranging conversation at Yale and beyond about political violence and its effects that transcends narrow disciplinary and methodological divisions. The workshop’s interdisciplinary nature attracts faculty and graduate students from Anthropology, African-American Studies, American Studies, History, Sociology, and Political Science, among others.

==== Program in Agrarian Studies ====
Co-directors: Kalyanakrishnan Sivaramakrishnan, Elisabeth Wood

The Program in Agrarian Studies challenges purely statistical and abstract social science research with popular knowledge and reasoning about poverty, subsistence, cultivation, justice, art, law, property, ritual life, cooperation, resource use, and state action.

==== Program in Global Participatory Research and Ethics ====
Director: Daniel Ebbs

The Program in Global Participatory Research and Ethics was developed to empower communities in low-resource settings to develop their own ethics training for community researchers. They foster inclusive, ethical, and culturally relevant research practices, with a special focus on participatory methodologies. They aim to amplify community voices and promote sustainable development of ethics training that extends beyond standard institutional training.

==== Translation Initiative ====
Director: Marijeta Bozovic

As human migration and globalization alter the manner and speed of language change, translation has become increasingly central to the workings of the contemporary world. The Yale Translation Initiative promotes the interdisciplinary study of translation at Yale and beyond, encompassing its literary, social, political, economic, legal, technological and medical dimensions.

==== Yale Center for the Study of Representative Institutions ====
Co-Directors: Isaac Nakhimovsky, Steven Smith

YCRI is dedicated to the study of representative institutions, broadly defined, in global and comparative perspective. It is an interdisciplinary undertaking, examining historical cases together with the political theory and social thought informing them.

==== Yale Research Initiative on Innovation and Scale (Y-RISE) ====
The Yale Research Initiative on Innovation & Scale (Y-RISE) advances research on the effects of global development policy interventions at scale. It is organized around five research networks that examine spillover effects, political economy reactions, and Macro/Growth and Welfare implications of policy interventions, external validity of trial results, and the capacity and demand for policy implementation.

== See also ==
- Yale Journal of International Affairs
