= Ernest Micek =

American businessman (1936–2020)

- Born: February 18, 1936; Arcadia, Wisconsin, U.S.
- Died: October 29, 2020 (aged 84); Dresbach, Minnesota, U.S.
- Education: University of Wisconsin–Madison
- Occupation: Business executive

Ernest S. Micek (February 18, 1936 – October 29, 2020) was an American businessman. He was the chairman and chief executive officer of Cargill from 1995 to 1999.

== Life and career ==
=== Early life ===
Ernest S. Micek was born in Arcadia, Wisconsin on February 18, 1936. He attended the University of Wisconsin–Madison, where he graduated with a BS degree in chemical engineering in 1959.

=== Career ===
In 1995, Micek succeeded Whitney MacMillan as chairman and chief executive officer of Cargill, working in those capacities until 1999.

=== Death ===
Micek died from a long illness in Dresbach, Minnesota, on October 29, 2020, at the age of 84.
