= Garda Capital Partners =

Investment management firm based in Wayzata, Minnesota

Garda Capital Partners LP
- Company type: Private
- Industry: Investment Management
- Predecessor: Black River Asset Management
- Founded: 2015; 11 years ago
- Founders: Jeff Drobny; Tim Magnusson; Robert Goedken
- Headquarters: Wayzata, Minnesota, U.S.
- Key people: Jeff Drobny (CEO); Tim Magnusson (CIO); Robert Goedken (General Counsel)
- Products: Hedge funds Fixed income
- AUM: ~US$11.65 billion (June 2025)
- Number of employees: 175 (2023)
- Website: www.gardacp.com

Garda Capital Partners (Garda) is an American investment management firm based in Wayzata, Minnesota that focuses on investments in fixed income securities. The firm originated from Black River Asset Management (Black River), an investment management unit of Cargill.

Outside the US, the firm has offices in Copenhagen, Geneva and Singapore.

== History ==
=== Black River Asset Management (2003 to 2015) ===
In 2003, Cargill launched its own hedge fund company, Black River Asset Management under its Global Capital Markets Group (GCM) to manage money for institutional investors. The founders of it were former Cargill executives Gary Jarrett (who also served as its CEO), Guilherme Schmidt and Jeremy Llewelyn. At the time Cargill was already experienced in investment management as GCM managed $12 billion of its own assets, In addition Cargill had its own futures brokerage and a value investment business that managed loans, real estate and corporate credit. Black River was formed to leverage Cargill's proprietary trading expertise by forming alternative investment products for institutional investors. In addition information Cargill acquired could be used for Black River investment strategies. Capco assisted Cargill in planning and implementing the operational support for Black River.

Jeff Drobny, a senior trader at Cargill, was transferred to Black River during its launch to be chief investment officer of its fixed-income relative-value investing strategy, which would be the flagship fund of Black River. It aimed to exploit opportunities in interest rate disparities across global fixed income markets.

By August 2008, Black River had $10 billion in assets under management. It had also expanded into private equity investments related to commodities.

In July 2015, Black River announced it would be shutting down four hedge funds citing withdrawals, market conditions and lack of investor demand. More than $1 billion would be returned to investors. During that time, the commodities market was performing poorly and Cargill itself had a profit decline of 19% in fiscal 2014, a loss not seen since 2001. However its funds in relative-value fixed income, emerging market credit and private equity would remain.

=== Garda Capital Partners (2015 to present) ===
In September 2015, Cargill decided to spin-off Black River into three separate employee-owned firms. At the time Black River had 149 employees and $5 billion in assets under management with $2 billion from relative-value fixed income and $3 billion from emerging market credit and private equity. Drobny, Tim Magnusson and Rob Goedken led a management buyout of the relative-value fixed income unit of Black River leading to the creation of an independent firm called Garda Capital Partners. The name "Garda" comes from Lake Garda in Italy. The firm at the time had 40 employees which were mainly from the relative-value fixed income team at Black River. Drobny who would be managing partner and chief investment officer stated Garda would remain in Minneapolis. The other two spin-offs from Black River were Proterra Investment Partners, a private equity fund manager and Argentem Creek Partners, an emerging market credit specialist. Cargill remained an investor with all three spin-offs.

Since launch, Garda had a low profile but grew significantly. By May 2019, Garda had doubled the number of assets under management to $4 billion as well as increased its number of employees to 71. Garda also had more institutional clients due to them seeking diversification in investments. According to Preqin, Garda's flagship strategy returned 7.8% annually over 15 years which includes the time it operated under Black River. According to Drobny, the strategy never had an annual loss in 15 years from its inception to 2019. Garda's management fee was 1.5% of assets annually plus 20% of any gains. At that time Affiliated Managers Group announced it would acquire a 25% stake in Garda.

Bloomberg News reported Garda had a return of 13.3% in 2022.

In 2024, Garda Capital Partners sued Schonfeld Strategic Advisors, alleging it induced one of its top portfolio managers, Nicolas Monaghan, to breach a non-compete agreement. Monaghan and an analyst had agreed to non-competes in late 2022. The non-compete agreements, which also set out their compensation, extend from March 2023 to March 2026. According to Garda, Schonfeld started communicating with the two men in July 2023 and Monaghan began preparing for his new role while still with Garda.
