= Amazon Soy Moratorium =

The Amazon Soy Moratorium is a voluntary private-sector agreement under which soy traders committed not to buy soy from farms that had any (legal or illegal) Brazilian Amazon deforestation past a cutoff date of 2008. After the moratorium, Amazon forest annual loss rates declined by over 80%, with a quarter of that reduction being directly attributable to the moratorium alone; this represents an aggregate approximate 3.2 million ha of land over the period 2008-2025. From 2006 to 2023, 97.6% of Amazon deforestation was not associated with soy, despite a 4x growth in soy area in the biome. It was hailed by many civil society groups as vital for slowing deforestation.

== Threats ==
In late 2024, the Brazilian state of Mato Grosso passed a law removing tax benefits from companies who make agreements that restrict purchases from legally allowed deforestation; farms that have illegal deforestation can only have the subset of crop produced on the illegally cleared land embargoed, not the farm as a whole. The law was challenged in Brazil's supreme court, and was suspended while litigation proceeded. Brazil's antitrust regulator, CADE, then decreed in late September 2025 that the soy moratorium would be suspended, with the suspension taking effect on 1 January 2026. Civil society organizations have warned that this could place an area about the size of Portugal at risk for clearing and have devastating climate and ecological impacts.
