= Cargill =

American multinational food conglomerate

Cargill, Incorporated

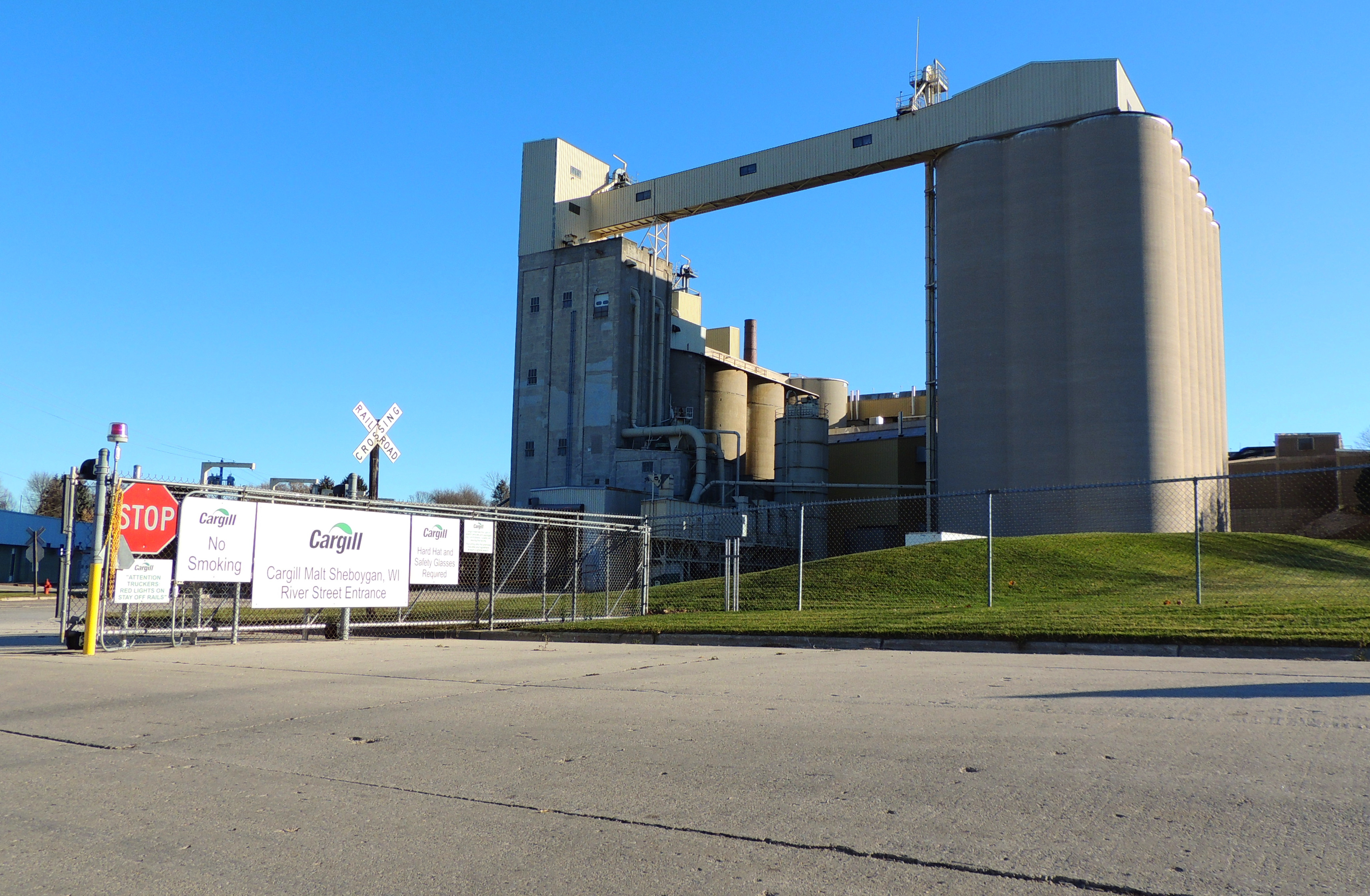
- Cargill Malt in Sheboygan, Wisconsin
- Type: Private
- Industry: Agribusiness; Food processing; Commodity trading
- Founded: 1865; 161 years ago
- Founder: William Wallace Cargill
- Headquarters: Minnetonka, Minnesota, U.S.
- Area served: Worldwide
- Key people: Brian Sikes (Chairman and CEO)
- Products: Agricultural commodities (grain, oilseeds); Food ingredients & sweeteners; Animal nutrition & feed; Biofuels & industrial biochemicals
- Services: Commodity trading & logistics; Financial risk management; Supply chain management; Agronomy & farming services
- Revenue: ▼US$154 billion (2025)
- Operating income: 3,204,000,000 United States dollar (2018)
- Net income: 3,103,000,000 United States dollar (2018)
- Total assets: 59,475,000,000 United States dollar (2018)
- Owner: Cargill family (88%)
- Number of employees: ~155,000 (2025)
- Website: www.cargill.com

Cargill, Incorporated is an American multinational corporation that trades, purchases and distributes grain and other agricultural commodities, such as palm oil; trades in energy, steel and transport; raises livestock and produces feed; and produces food ingredients such as starch, glucose syrup, and vegetable oils and fats for use and resale by food manufacturers, the food service industry, and retailers. Cargill also has a large financial services arm that manages risks in the commodity markets for the company. Headquartered in Minnetonka, Minnesota, the company was founded in 1865 by William Wallace Cargill. As of 2023, Cargill was the largest privately held company in the United States in terms of revenue.

Cargill has been a subject of long-term and widespread scrutiny for a variety of issues, including child trafficking and child slave labor and other human rights abuses, union busting, ignoring worker safety during COVID-19, land grabbing, food contamination with mercury and E. coli, deforestation, air pollution, tax evasion, animal abuse, toxic spills, building on restorable wetlands, contributing to the antibiotic resistance crisis, and price fixing.

In 2003, the company split off a portion of its financial operations into Black River Asset Management, a hedge fund with about $10 billion of assets and liabilities. It previously owned two-thirds of the shares of The Mosaic Company (sold off in 2011), a producer and marketer of concentrated phosphate and potash crop nutrients.

The company supplies about 22% of the United States domestic meat market. It is the only US producer of Alberger process salt, which is used in the fast-food and prepared food industries.

Cargill has remained a family-owned business, with family having connections to descendants of the founder owning over 90% of the company. In January 2023, Brian Sikes was appointed as president and CEO.

== History ==
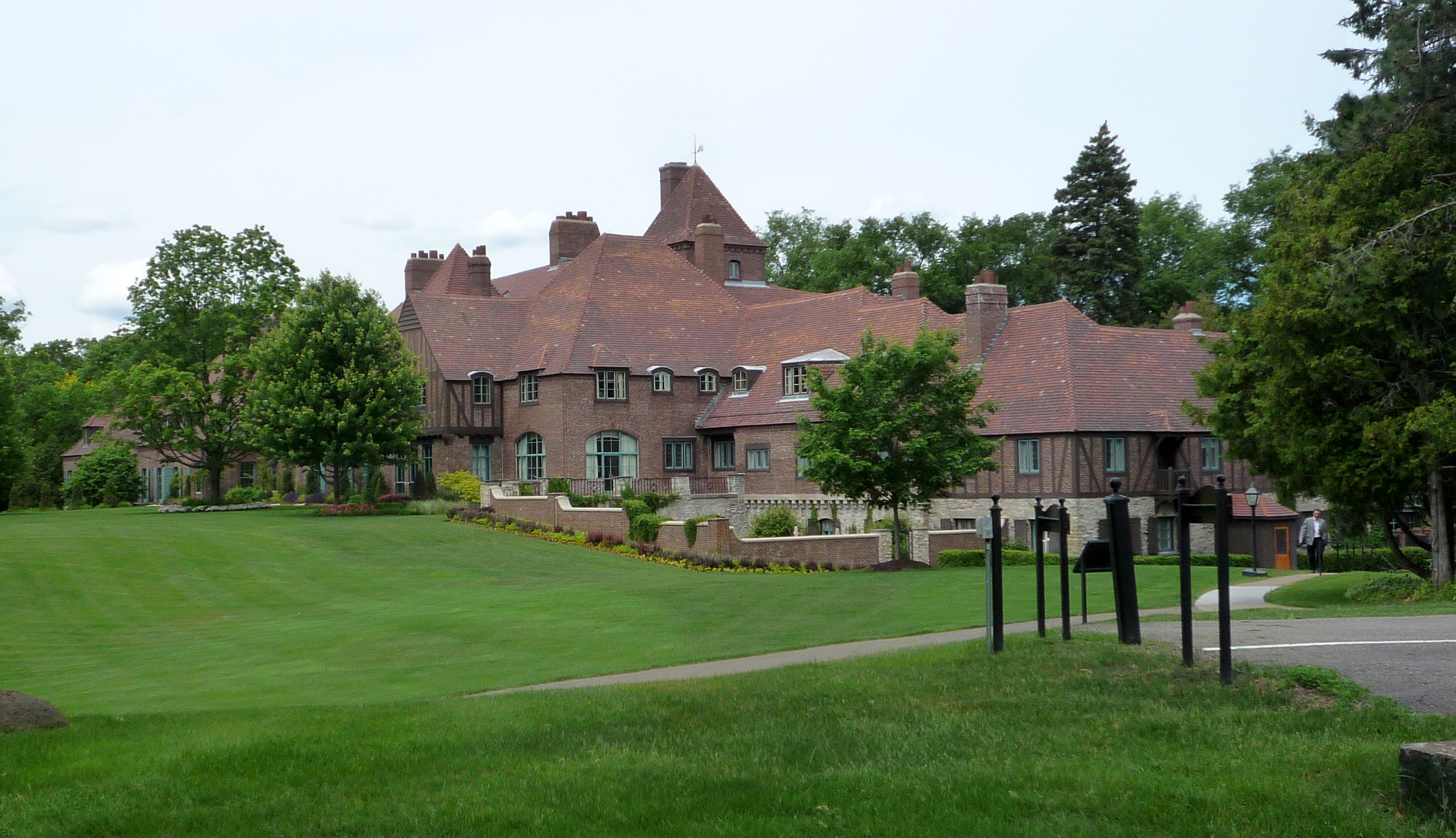
The Cargill Lake Office, occupying the former Rufus Rand mansion on the main corporate campus in Minnetonka, formerly housed the company's top executives; the company's 2016 CEO decided it was bad optics, moved the senior executive out, and the historic mansion was demolished by Cargill in 2020.

=== 19th century ===
Cargill was founded in 1865 in Conover, Iowa, by William Wallace Cargill. A year later William was joined by his brother Sam, forming W. W. Cargill and Brother. Together, they built grain flat houses and opened a lumberyard. In 1875, Cargill moved to La Crosse, Wisconsin, and their brother James joined the business.

Sam Cargill left La Crosse in 1887 to manage the office in Minneapolis, an important emerging grain center. Three years later, the Minneapolis operation incorporated as Cargill Elevator Co.; some years after that, the La Crosse operation incorporated as W. W. Cargill Company of La Crosse, Wisconsin. In 1898, John H. MacMillan Sr. and his brother, Daniel, began working for W. W. Cargill.

=== 20th century ===
Upon Sam Cargill's death in 1903, William Cargill became the sole owner of the La Crosse office. John MacMillan was named general manager of Cargill Elevator Company and moved his family to Minneapolis. William Cargill died in 1909, with Cargill's debt creating a fiscal crisis for the company. The company issued $2.25 million in Gold Notes, backed by Cargill stock, to pay off its creditors. The Gold Notes were due in 1917, but record grain prices during World War I enabled all debts to be paid by 1915. MacMillan worked to resolve the credit issues and to force his brother-in-law, William S. Cargill, out of the company.

John MacMillan ran the company until his retirement in 1936. Under his leadership, Cargill opened its first East Coast offices in New York in 1923. He was also the architect of the company's strategy of internationalism. He opened the company's first Canadian, European and Latin American offices in 1928, 1929, and 1930. He was also noted for his involvement in the controversial commercial rapprochement between the U.S. and the Soviet Union.

As World War I continued into 1917, Cargill reported record earnings and faced criticism for war profiteering. Four years later, as a fallout from the financial crash of 1920, Cargill posted its first loss. Cargill opened its first Canadian operations in Montreal in 1928 as Cargill Grain Company Ltd.

In 1934 the Chicago Board of Trade denied membership to Cargill. The US government overturned the Board's ruling and forced it to accept Cargill as a member. The 1936 corn crop failed, and with the 1937 crop unavailable until October, the Chicago Board of Trade ordered Cargill to sell some of its corn. Cargill refused to comply. As a result, the U.S. Commodity Exchange Authority and the Chicago Board of Trade accused Cargill of attempting to corner the corn market, and in 1938, the Chicago Board suspended Cargill and three of its officers from the trading floor. When the Board lifted its suspension a few years later, Cargill refused to rejoin, instead trading through independent traders.

During World War II, MacMillan Jr. continued to expand the company, which boomed as it stored and transported grain and built T1 tankers and Towboats ships for the United States Navy. Cargill purchased the stock of Nutrena Feeds in 1945. After the war, it began focusing on animal feeds, which were in short supply, and purchased Nutrena, known as Nutrena Mills at the time. The purchase doubled the size of Cargill's animal feed business.

In 1960, Erwin Kelm became the first non-family chief executive. Aiming for expansion into downstream production, he led the company into milling, starches, and syrups. As the company grew, it developed a market intelligence network to coordinate its commodities trading, processing, freight, shipping, and futures businesses. By 1972, Cargill's business grew to $5 billion in sales, becoming the largest agricultural trader in the world.

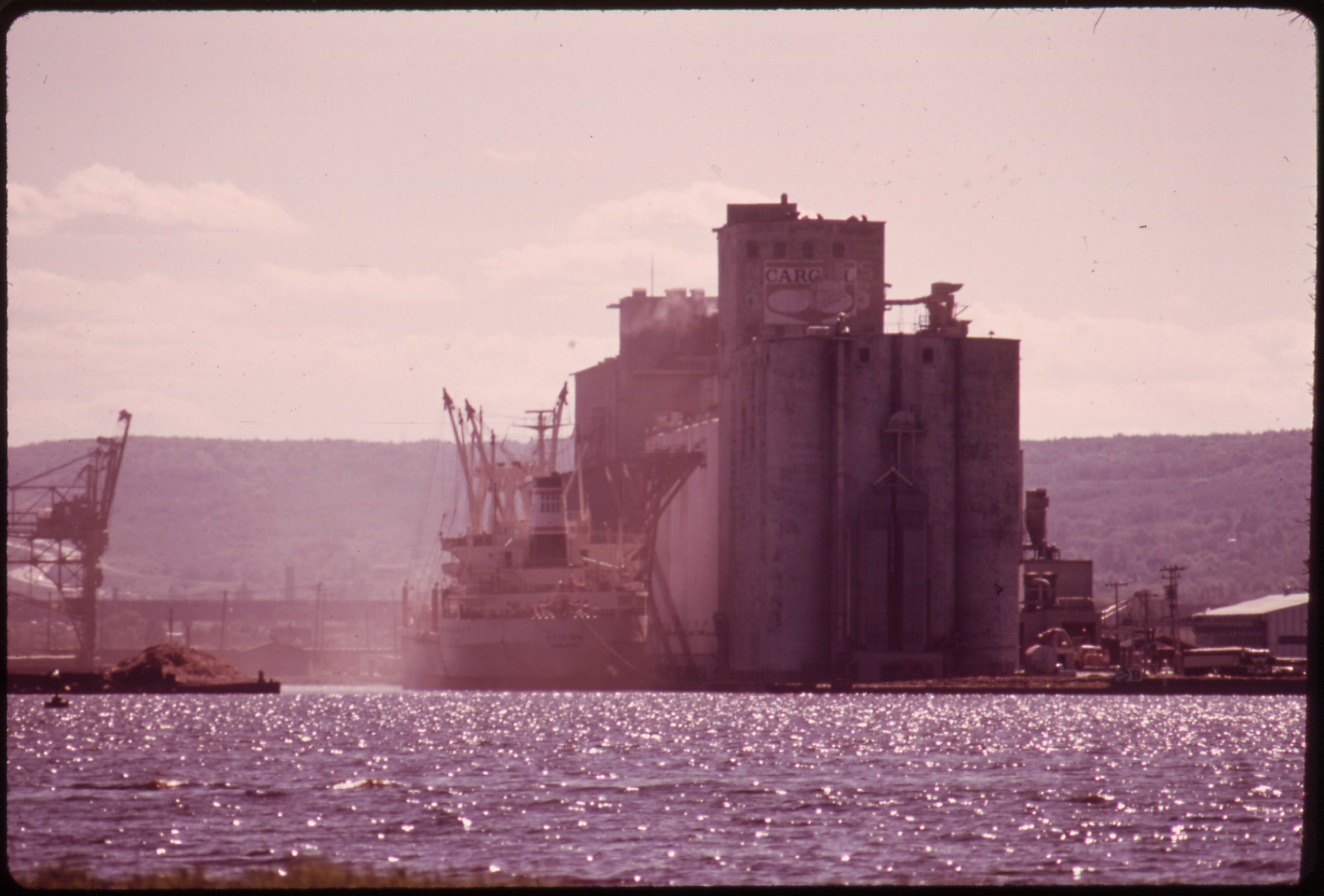
Dust fills the air as ships are loaded from a Cargill grain elevator in Duluth, Minnesota, 1973

When the Soviet Union entered the grain markets in the 1970s, demand surged to unprecedented levels, benefiting Cargill. In 1963, Cargill had already negotiated a $40 million wheat deal with the USSR, establishing a relationship that later involved a series of larger deals. When Whitney MacMillan, nephew of John Jr., took over the company from Kelm in 1976, revenue approached $30 billion. The US government put pressure on large grain exporters with allegations of manipulating the market, and Cargill was a major target, but it emerged without any major changes.

In 1978, Cargill purchased the large Leslie Salt refining company in Newark, California, from Schilling. In 1979, Cargill entered the meat-processing business with the purchase of beef processor MBPXL (later Excel). The division, which expanded into turkey, food service and food distribution businesses, is now known as Cargill Meat Solutions. In 1986, Cargill began operations in Venezuela through a partnership with the Possenti family's Mimesa C.A. to form Agroindustrial Mimesa in Maracaibo, dedicated to manufacturing flour and pasta. In 1993, the company responded to demands for an initial public offering with an employee stock ownership plan, using a 17% stake purchased from 72 Cargills and MacMillans for $730 million. The company's board of directors was reorganized to reduce the number of relatives to six, alongside six independents and five managers.

Ernest Micek took over as chief executive in August 1995. Cargill underwent turmoil in the following years; its financial unit lost hundreds of millions of dollars in 1998 when Russia defaulted on debt and developing countries began to have financial issues. The commodities and ingredients business, which accounted for 75% of Cargill's total revenue, was affected by the 1997 Asian financial crisis. Revenues fell by double-digit percentages for two years in a row, from $55.7 billion in 1997 to $51.4 billion in 1998 and $45.7 billion in 1999, while net income fell from $814 million in 1997 to $468 million in 1998 and $220 million in 1999. By 1999, the company had $4 billion in debt. Following a downgrade of its previously strong bond credit rating, Micek announced he would step down a year early. In 1998, Warren Staley became chief executive, and the company sold assets such as its coffee and rubber businesses.

=== 21st century ===
Cargill barge loading facility on the Mississippi River opposite St. Louis

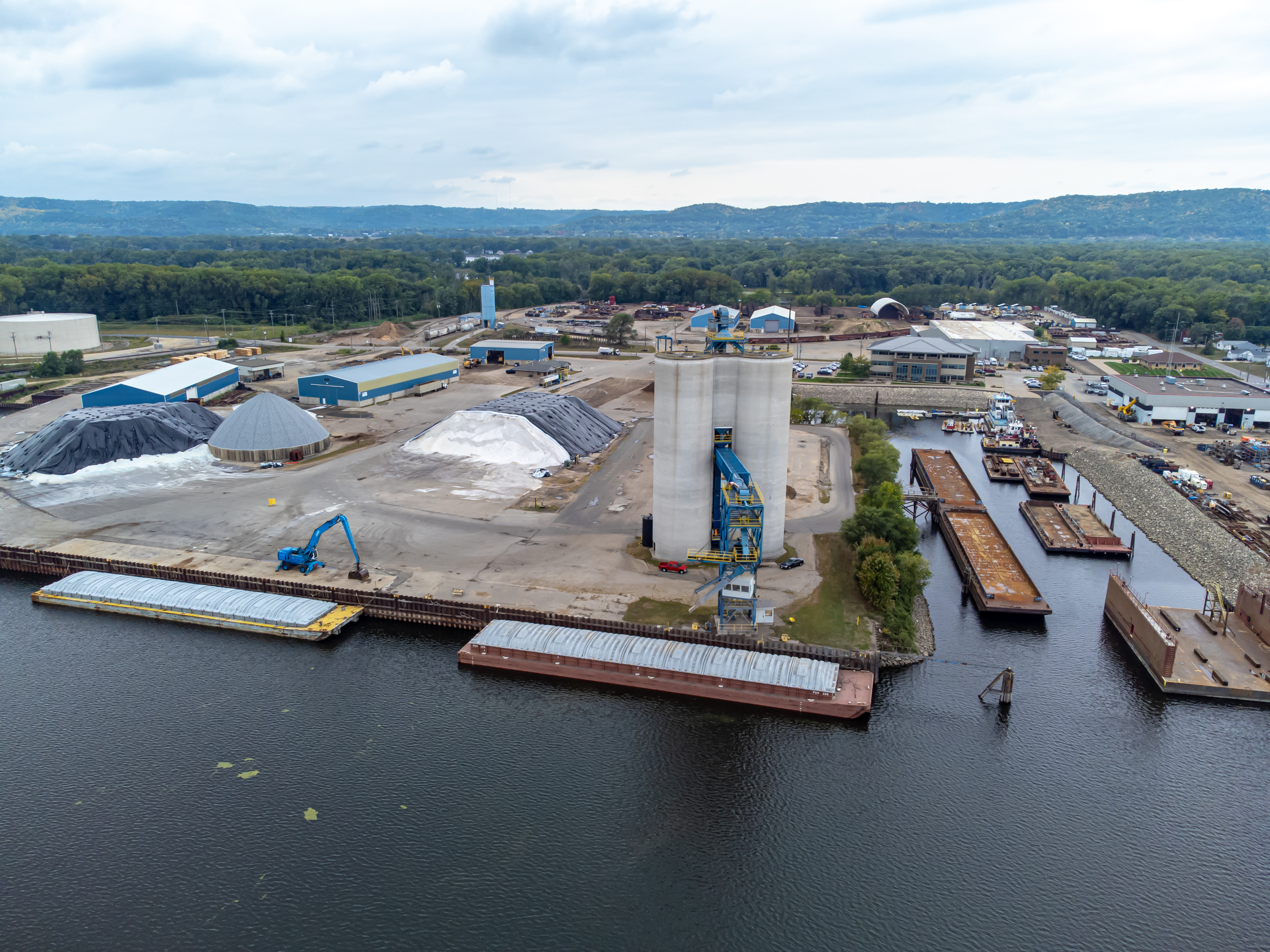
Cargill dock in La Crosse, Wisconsin

In 2002 Cargill acquired European-based starch manufacturer Cerestar from Montedison for $1.1 billion. Cargill Meat Solutions acquired Milwaukee Emmpak in 2003 and merged it with Taylor Packing Co. (purchased in 2001). In 2006, Cargill Meat purchased Fresno Meats. On June 1, 2007, Staley was succeeded as CEO by Gregory R. Page. Cargill's quarterly profits exceeded $1 billion for the first time during the quarter ending on February 29, 2008 ($1.03 billion).

In October 2011, the U.S. Justice Department announced that a biotech specialist at Cargill had pleaded guilty to stealing information from Cargill and Dow AgroSciences. Kexue Huang, a Chinese national, was discovered to be passing trade secrets back to China. In November 2011, Cargill completed the acquisition of Provimi, a global animal nutrition company for €1.5 billion ($2.1 billion US).

In December 2013 CEO and chairman Page was succeeded by Dave MacLennan. In December 2014, Cargill completed the commissioning of a $100 million cocoa plant in Indonesia. In 2015, Cargill wound down its Black River Asset Management division by shutting down hedge funds, folding funds into Cargill, as well as spinning off funds to create Proterra Investment Partners, Argentem Creek Partners and Garda Capital Partners.

In 2016, Cargill announced it would move its Protein Group headquarters from older buildings in downtown Wichita, Kansas, to a new, $60 million building in the nearby Old Town area, atop the site of the soon-to-be demolished historic building that formerly housed The Wichita Eagle. In 2017, Cargill sold its Geneva-based petroleum-trading business to Macquarie Bank as well as its North American power and gas trading business soon after.

In 2018, Cargill and Faccenda Foods established a joint venture, Avara Foods, to take over their UK fresh poultry businesses, employing 6,000 people. In February 2018, Cargill completed its purchase of Pro Pet, a pet food manufacturer. Pro Pet had three manufacturing facilities, one in Owatonna, Minnesota, one in Kansas City, Kansas, and one in St. Marys, Ohio. In November 2018, Cargill sold its 13 crop input locations in Ontario, Canada to La Coop Fédérée. Also 2018, Cargill made a $25 million investment in Puris, a supplier of pea protein used in Beyond Meat products. In 2019, Cargill invested an additional $75 million.

On June 3, 2020, Cargill announced it would no longer publish quarterly results, ending disclosures the company had provided since 1996. Cargill canceled its third-quarter earnings release in March 2020 amid the COVID-19 pandemic. In December 2021, Croda announced the sale of one of its divisions to Cargill for $1 billion. In 2022, Cargill saw record profits due to the Russian invasion of Ukraine and rising food prices, during which the company has continued to pay the Russian government. In January 2023, Brian Sikes was appointed president and CEO.

== Criticism ==
As a private company, Cargill is not required to release the same amount of information as a publicly traded company and, as a business practice, keeps a relatively low profile.

In 2019, the NGO Mighty Earth released a 56-page report on Cargill. Mighty Earth chair and former U.S. Congressman Henry A. Waxman called Cargill "the worst company in the world" and said it drives "the most important problems facing our world" (deforestation, pollution, climate change, exploitation) "at a scale that dwarfs their closest competitors."

In 2019, the Swiss NGO Public Eye also criticized Cargill in various contexts in a report on agricultural commodity traders in Switzerland.

=== Child trafficking ===
In 2005, the International Labor Rights Fund filed suit against Cargill, Nestlé, and Archer Daniels Midland in a US federal court on behalf of children who said they were trafficked as child slaves from Mali into Côte d'Ivoire and forced to work on cocoa bean plantations 12 to 14 hours a day with no pay, little food and sleep, and frequent physical abuse.

Even more recent evidence stems from a 2019 TV program on French channel France 2 about cocoa illegally harvested from protected areas in Côte d'Ivoire. The report found child slave labor to be widespread on the plantations investigated: every third worker was a child. Instances of child trafficking from neighboring Burkina Faso were also reported. Cargill, which buys from the plantations under investigation, initially denied buying cocoa from protected areas but was forced to admit that its traceability system had not reached these areas and therefore could not fully trace the origins of its cocoa. Swiss-based food giant Nestlé is one of Cargill's biggest customers of cocoa sourced from Côte d'Ivoire, as later reported by Swiss TV channel RTS 1.

In 2021, eight formerly enslaved children from Mali named Cargill in a class action lawsuit, alleging that it aided and abetted their enslavement on cocoa plantations in Côte d'Ivoire. The suit accused Cargill, along with Nestlé, Barry Callebaut, Mars, Incorporated, Olam International, The Hershey Company, and Mondelez International, of knowingly engaging in forced labor, and sought damages for unjust enrichment, negligent supervision, and intentional infliction of emotional distress.

=== Child labor ===
Cargill was a major buyer of cotton in Uzbekistan, despite the industry's prevalence of uncompensated workers and possible human rights abuses, and admissions by two representatives that the company is aware of child labor in the production of its crops. Their concerns have been public since 2005.

In December 2010, an international complaint in France, Germany, Switzerland, and the United Kingdom was filed against Cargill for knowingly profiting from child labor in Uzbekistan. The complaint alleged that children were forced out of their schools to assist with cotton harvesting, for which their families saw no profits. Individual agreements were made with each of the filing countries, though by 2013 a follow-up evaluation showed that Cargill lessened its commitment after media coverage passed.

In September 2023, Cargill was fined the equivalent of $120,185 by a Brazilian court for its use of child labor in cocoa harvesting.

=== Union busting ===
In February 2018, several employees of Cargill's Dayton, Virginia plant held protests, including an organized strike outside of a Cargill plant in the city. Their grievances included poor health benefits, poor working conditions, and Cargill's alleged firing of employees who organized to form a union. The protests led to the arrests of nine people for trespassing on company property.

In August 2018, Cargill faced legal accusations in Turkey for allegedly firing fourteen union members without justifiable reason. Cargill denied the allegations, until the final rulings in late 2019 and early 2020 stated that at least eight of the former employees were fired only because of their ties to the union, while four of the remaining were also unfairly dismissed. Cargill was ordered to pay additional severance to each of these workers.

=== Wage-fixing ===
In 2024, Cargill paid $30 million to settle a class-action lawsuit alleging collusion with other beef producers to suppress wages at meatpacking plants. Alongside JBS Foods, Tyson, and National Beef, Cargill is considered to be one of the nation's largest meat processors, constituting over 85% of U.S. beef production. Law firm Hagens Berman claimed that "Cargill and other meat companies shared compensation data through third parties and 'secret meetings' over several years to hold wages and benefits at artificially low levels." Cargill denied the allegations in a company statement, attributing their settlement decision "to avoid[ing] larger litigation costs and distractions from the critical work our production teams do."

=== Worker safety during COVID-19 ===
During the COVID-19 outbreak in 2020, a single meat processing plant in High River, Canada, was linked to over 358 cases of infection. United Food and Commercial Workers Canada Union Local 401 president Thomas Hesse said, "It's a tragedy. We asked days and days ago for that plant to be closed temporarily for two weeks, send all of the workers home with pay to isolate. That was when we were aware of 38 cases. That was before they set up a dedicated testing facility in the area." Reports of employees being denied personal protective equipment also surfaced around the same period. As of May 3, 2020, 917 of the plant's 2,000 workers had tested positive, and the plant was linked to 1,501 total cases.

=== Land grabbing ===
The NGO Oxfam has documented an illustrative case of land grabbing. Between 2010 and 2012, Cargill brought large areas of land in Colombia under its control despite legal restrictions on acquiring state land. To accomplish this, Cargill established at least 36 mailbox companies, enabling it to exceed the legally prescribed maximum landholding size. With more than 50,000 hectares of land, Cargill acquired more than 30 times the legally permitted limit for a single owner.

=== Food contamination ===
In 1971, Cargill sold 63,000 tons of seed treated with a methylmercury-based fungicide that, when eaten, eventually caused at least 650 deaths. The fumigated seed grain was provided by Cargill at the specific request of Saddam Hussein and was never intended for direct human or animal consumption before planting.

Cargill's grain—which was dyed red and labeled with warnings in Spanish and English as well as a skull and crossbones design following a previous incident of mercury-treated seed being sold as food in Iraqi markets in 1960—was distributed too late for much of the 1971 planting season, causing many farmers to sell their excess product in the public markets at very low prices; this attracted many poor Iraqis who either could not understand the warnings or disregarded them, causing thousands of cases of mercury poisoning. The long latency period before developing symptoms and cattle's greater tolerance of mercury poisoning also contributed to the mistaken impression that the surplus seed grain was safe to eat.

In October 2007, Cargill announced the recall of nearly 850,000 frozen beef patties produced at its packing plant in Butler, Wisconsin that were suspected of being contaminated with E. coli. The beef was sold mainly at Walmart and Sam's Club stores.

In March 2009, the Australian Quarantine and Inspection Service (AQIS) temporarily suspended Cargill Australia's license to export meat to Japan and the US after E. coli was detected in Cargill's export containers from its Wagga Wagga plant. In late April 2009, AQIS lifted Cargill Australia's suspension on its export license.

In August 2011, the USDA and Cargill jointly announced a recall of 36 million pounds of ground turkey produced at Cargill's Springdale, Arkansas, plant due to salmonella concerns. The Centers for Disease Control and Prevention announced that the specific Salmonella strain identified was resistant to commonly prescribed antibiotics. One death and 76 illnesses from 26 states were reported.

In September 2011, Cargill announced a second, immediate and voluntary Class One recall of 185,000 pounds of 85% lean, fresh-ground turkey products because of possible contamination from Salmonella Heidelberg.

In July 2012, the Vermont Department of Public Health reported that 10 people in the state had become ill from ground beef recalled by Cargill Beef. Hannaford Supermarkets alerted consumers that Cargill Beef was voluntarily recalling 29,339 pounds of ground beef that might contain salmonella.

=== Deforestation ===
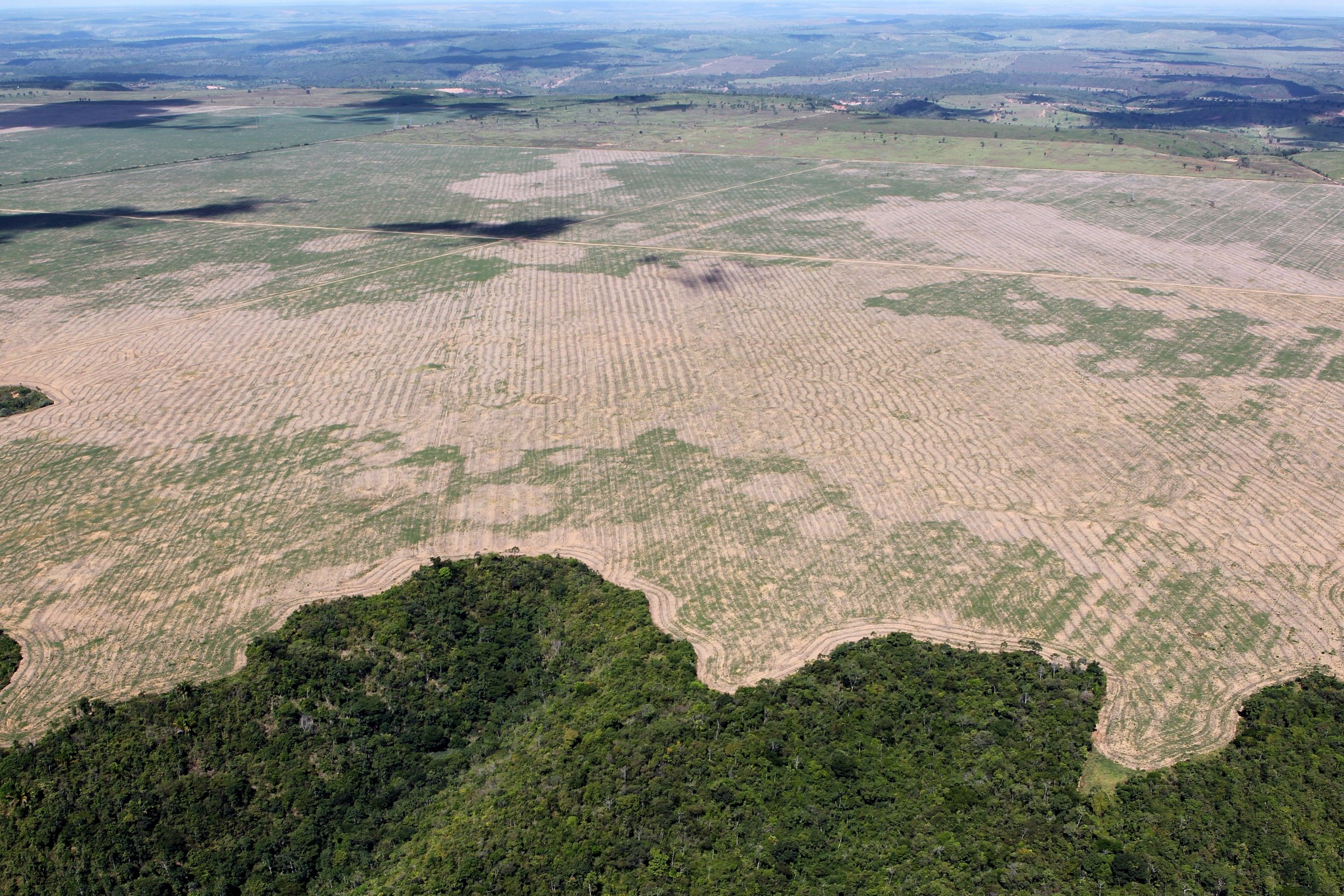
Deforestation in the Maranhão state, Brazil, in July 2016

==== Soy ====
In 2003, Cargill completed a port for processing soya in Santarém in the Amazon region of Brazil, dramatically increasing soya production in the area and, according to Greenpeace, speeding up deforestation of local rain forest. In February 2006, the federal courts in Brazil gave Cargill six months to complete an environmental assessment. Initially supported by job-seeking locals, the port faced public opposition as jobs failed to materialize. In July 2006, the federal prosecutor indicated they were close to shutting down the port.

Greenpeace took its campaign to major food retailers and quickly won agreement from McDonald's and UK retailers Asda, Waitrose, and Marks & Spencer to stop buying meat raised on Amazonian soya. These retailers have, in turn, put pressure on Cargill, Archer Daniels Midland, Bunge, André Maggi Group, and Dreyfus to prove their soya was not grown on recently deforested land in the Amazon. In July 2006, Cargill reportedly joined other soy businesses in Brazil in a two-year moratorium on purchasing soybeans from newly deforested land.

In 2019 the six largest agricultural commodity traders, ADM, Bunge, Cargill, LDC, COFCO Int. and Glencore Agri, committed themselves to monitoring their soy supply chains in Brazil's Cerrado.

==== Palm oil ====
Cargill sells large volumes of palm oil, which is found in many processed foods, cosmetics, and detergents. Most palm oil is obtained from plantations in Sumatra and Borneo, which have been heavily deforested to make way for them.

==== Cocoa ====
On September 13, 2017, NGO Mighty Earth released a report documenting findings that Cargill purchases cocoa grown illegally in national parks and other protected forests in the Ivory Coast.

The report accused Cargill of endangering the forest habitats of chimpanzees, elephants, and other wildlife populations by purchasing cocoa linked to deforestation. As a result of cocoa production, 7 of the 23 Ivorian protected areas have been almost entirely converted to cocoa. Cargill was notified of the findings of Mighty Earth's investigation and did not deny that the company sourced its cocoa from protected areas in the Ivory Coast.

Data released in April 2019 by Global Forest Watch, an online platform providing data and tools for monitoring forests, showed that rates of tropical primary forest loss increased dramatically in 2018 in Ghana and Côte d'Ivoire, primarily due to cocoa farming and gold mining. In 2018, Ghana had the highest rate of increase (60%) in the world compared to 2017, with Côte d'Ivoire (26%) in second place.

=== Air pollution ===
In 2005, the company settled with the Department of Justice and Environmental Protection Agency over Clean Air Act violations, including a plan to invest over $60 million in capital improvements for clean air controls, after a joint federal and state effort that included Alabama, Georgia, Indiana, Illinois, Iowa, Missouri, Nebraska, North Carolina, North Dakota, and Ohio.

In 2006, NatureWorks, a subsidiary in Nebraska, settled with the state over inadequate air pollution controls.

In 2015, Cargill settled with the EPA over Clean Air Act violations in a plant in Iowa.

=== Tax evasion ===
In 2011, a case of transfer mispricing came to light in Argentina involving the world's four largest grain traders: ADM, Bunge, Cargill, and LDC. Argentina's revenue and customs service began an investigation into the four companies when agricultural commodity prices spiked in 2008, but very little profit had been reported to the office. As a result of the investigation, it was alleged that the companies had submitted false sales declarations and routed profits through tax havens or to their headquarters. In some cases, they were said to have used dummy corporations to buy grain and to inflate costs in Argentina to reduce recorded profits there. According to Argentina's revenue and customs service, the outstanding taxes amounted to almost US$1 billion. The companies involved have denied the allegations. As of 2019, the Argentinian tax authorities have not replied to Swiss NGO Public Eye’s request as to the state of the case.

In its 2018 annual report to the US Securities and Exchange Commission (SEC), Bunge mentioned provisions that suggested the case was still ongoing.

The Argentine tax court ruled officially against Cargill in 2023, mandating the associated fine and interest.

=== Animal welfare ===
In 2015, Cargill announced it would phase out gestation crates for its sows by 2017, reportedly in response to pressure from clients and consumers.

In 2022, an inspection into a Dayton turkey factory revealed infractions against the Poultry Products Inspection Act, an act intended to minimize suffering to poultry animals. In contrast to the requirements of this act, Cargill allow turkeys to die from asphyxiation without first being stunned or slaughtered.

=== Antibiotic usage ===
In 2024, the USDA reported that Cargill was administering human-grade antibiotics to its cattle, despite labelling the beef products as "raised without antibiotics," a breach of truth-in-advertising/labeling standards. The Bureau of Investigative Journalism then reported that the antibiotics covertly given by Cargill to its cattle were human-use, meaning they would significantly contribute to human population antibiotic resistance, a source of human suffering prioritized by the UN.

=== Price fixing ===
In 2024, McDonald's Corporation sued JBS, National Beef, Cargill, and Tyson, along with their subsidiaries, for alleged price fixing. In 2026, both Cargill and Tyson settled, agreeing to pay $87.5 million.

== See also ==
- Cargill family
- Criticisms of Cargill
- Cargill Russia
- Margaret Anne Cargill
- Golden Triangle of Meat-packing
